= Ulysses (German band) =

German progressive rock band

Ulysses is a German-Australian progressive rock band from the early 1990s. They were part of a colourful scene of new bands, labels and magazines that emerged in Germany at that time. Musically, they were less influenced by the German "Krautrock" phenomenon but initially oriented strongly towards the second generation of British progressive rock bands (E.g. Marillion, IQ, Pendragon). Hegarty & Halliwell would have classified them as part of third wave of progressive rock bands, who can also be described as a second generation of neo-progressive bands. So one might not wonder that most reviewers heard similarities to Marillion, Galahad and Änglagård in their music which is characterised by a strong emphasis on melodies and the integration of folkloristic elements, abrupt changes of moods (mostly melancholic and sombre) and partly complex and ever changing arrangements often moving towards a climax.

The lyrics written by singer Gerard Hynes often have a literary quality and typically blend autobiographical elements with literary influences. The lyrics to ‘Trial at Reclaimed Manor Farm’, for example, are based on George Orwell’s ‘Animal Farm’. In a detailed interview with radio presenter and musicologist Krzystof Zielinski, he discusses further references to John Donne (“Forever Lost”) or John Toland’s biography of Hitler (“Vagabond Child”), right through to Oscar Wilde and John Milton (“Do You Know Her?”). The lyrics of ‘Teenage Sweethearts’ are compared in an article in the anthology Progressive Rock. Beyond Time, Genre, Geography with other lyrics by Derek Dick (Fish/Marillion), Galahad and Steven Wilson (Porcupine Tree) and their exploration of childhood trauma.

== History ==
Ulysses was established in 1990 in Wiesbaden by bassist Ender Kilic, guitarist Mirko Rudnik and keyboarder Thomas Diehl. Their name refers both to the ancient Greek hero Οδυσσέας and to James Joyce's best-known work Ulysses.

Joined by Dane drummer Jasper Stannow and Australian singer Gerard P. Hynes, Ulysses recorded their first studio demos in December 1991. After Stannow left the band, Ulysses found their permanent drummer in Robert Zoom. With this line-up they recorded their debut album "Neronia" produced by renowned British musicians Clive Nolan (Arena, Pendragon, Shadowland) and Karl Groom (Threshold) in 1993. Guest vocalist on two tracks was Tracy Hitchings (Quasar, Strangers On A Train, Landmarq).

Ulysses' "Neronia" CD was released on Michael Schmitz's and Thomas Waber's renowned Inside Out Music label. A cassette edition was licensed to Metal Mind Production/Massacre Records.

With their new singer, Marc Jost, Ulysses promoted the Neronia album throughout Europe, playing shows and festivals in Poland, Germany and the Netherlands, and opening for Pendragon on their "The Window of Life" European tour in 1994.

In 1995 Ulysses played in the final of Germany's oldest and best-known rock festival for young talent, the 1822-Rock Festival.

Due to a looming naming rights dispute, Ulysses changed their band name to Neronia in 1995 and after many line-up changes released their second album "Nerotica" in 2004.

At the end of 2011, the Ulysses album Neronia was voted into Germany's Prog Top 40 by the German rock magazine Eclipsed.

In 2021, Ulysses reunited with most of the original line-up named Ulysses Resurrection Project.

A remastered and expanded 2-CD set of the band's debut album was released in October 2023 on the Polish label GAD Records/chickadisc to mark the 30th anniversary of the first release.

In June 2026 Ulysses releases its first single "Do You Know Her?"

In August 2026, "Call for Caution" followed as another archive release from the band’s musically fascinating formative period, giving a preview of an extensive release of the band’s early demo recordings planned for 2027/28.

== Discography ==
=== Singles ===
- 2026: Do You Know Her? (WAV/mp3 download & stream)
- 2026: Call for Caution (WAV/mp3 download & stream)

=== Studio albums ===
- 1992: Ulysses (Ulysses/self release/Cassette-EP)Ulysses (20) - Ulysses
- 1993: Neronia (Ulysses/Pyramusic CD-Album)Ulysses – Neronia (1993, CD)
- 1994: Neronia (Ulysses/SPV/InsideOut CD-Album)Neronia
- 1994: Neronia (Ulysses/Metal Mind Productions Records/Massacre Records Cassette-Album)Ulysses – Neronia (Cassette)
- 2002: w/o title (Neronia/Nova Entertainment CD-EP)
- 2003: Nerotica (Neronia/Nova Entertainment CD-Album)Nerotica by Neronia
- 2023: Neronia 30th Anniversary Edition (Ulysses/GAD Records/chickadisc; 2CD-Set)

=== Compilations ===
- 1992: Music for a Better World (Bamot Island Film & Records) Ulysses - Teenage Sweethearts - Demo
- 1992: The Secret World - Skelletons in the Cupboard II (Clive Nolan Cassette-Sampler, Fan Club release) Ulysses - Teenage Sweethearts (Demo)
- 1995: 1822-Rock Festival Finale 5. März 1995 (Frankfurter Sparkasse) Ulysses - She-Cat (live)1822-Rock-Festival Finale 5. März 1995 (1995, CD)
- 2004: Empire Art Rock 71 (Empire Music) Neronia - Drenched In Tears Empire Art Rock 71 (2004, CD)
- 2004: Music From Time And Space Vol. 8 (Eclipsed) Neronia - One Moment Music From Time And Space Vol. 8 (2004, CD)

=== Music videos ===
- 1994: Forever Lost

== Members ==
=== Original members ===
- Ender Kilic – bass (1990–2012)
- Mirko Rudnik – guitars (1990–present)
- Thomas Diehl – keyboards (1990–1995)
- Andreas Simon – drums (1990)
- Gerard Hynes – vocals (1991–1993)

=== Current members ===
- Mirko Rudnik – guitars, basses, keyboards (1990–present)
- Robert Zoom – drums, keyboards (1992–present)
- Gerard Hynes – vocals (1991–1993, 2021–present)

=== Former members ===
- Peter Lerch – drums (1991)
- Jasper Stannow – drums (1991–1992)
- Marc Jost – vocals, guitars (1994–1995)
- Thomas Cordey – keyboards (1995)
- Mignon Fuchs - backing vocals (1992)
