= European Journey =

Live album by Threshold
- Released: 13 November 2015
- Recorded: 2014
- Genre: Progressive metal
- Length: 1:54:04
- Label: Nuclear Blast

Threshold chronology
For the Journey (2014)	European Journey (2015)	Legends of the Shires (2017)

European Journey is the fifth live release by progressive metal band Threshold. The double album was recorded at various venues across Europe during their 2014 tour. It entered the UK rock chart at no. 22 on 20 November 2015.

Threshold keyboard player Richard West commented on the album: "We had a fantastic tour playing so many fan favorites going back to '97 with 'Part Of The Chaos' through 'Mission Profile', 'Pilot In The Sky Of Dreams' to the present day with 'The Box'. We recorded some shows along the way and it's turned into this really powerful double album".

== Track listing ==
=== Disc 1 ===
1. "Slipstream" – 5:55 (Groom/West)
2. "The Hours" – 8:29 (West/Anderson)
3. "Liberty Complacency Dependency" – 7:41 (Groom/West)
4. "Ground Control" – 7:21 (West)
5. "Unforgiven" – 6:20 (Groom/West)
6. "Long Way Home" – 6:03 (West/Midson)
7. "Part Of The Chaos" – 9:26 (Groom/Jeary/Midson)
8. "Coda" – 5:32 (Morten)

=== Disc 2 ===
1. "Watchtower On The Moon" – 5:36 (Groom/West)
2. "Pilot In The Sky Of Dreams" – 10:21 (West)
3. "Lost In Your Memory" – 4:45 (West)
4. "Mission Profile" – 8:43 (Groom/West)
5. "The Box" – 12:42 (Groom/West)
6. "Turned To Dust" – 4:23 (West)
7. "Ashes" – 7:39 (Groom/West)

== Personnel ==
=== Band members ===
- Damian Wilson - lead vocals
- Karl Groom - guitar, backing vocals
- Richard West - keyboards, backing vocals
- Johanne James - drums
- Steve Anderson - bass guitar, backing vocals
- Pete Morten - guitar, backing vocals

=== Production ===
- Produced by Karl Groom and Richard West
- Recorded by David Sievers
- Mixed and mastered by Karl Groom
