= Karl Groom =

British guitarist and record producer

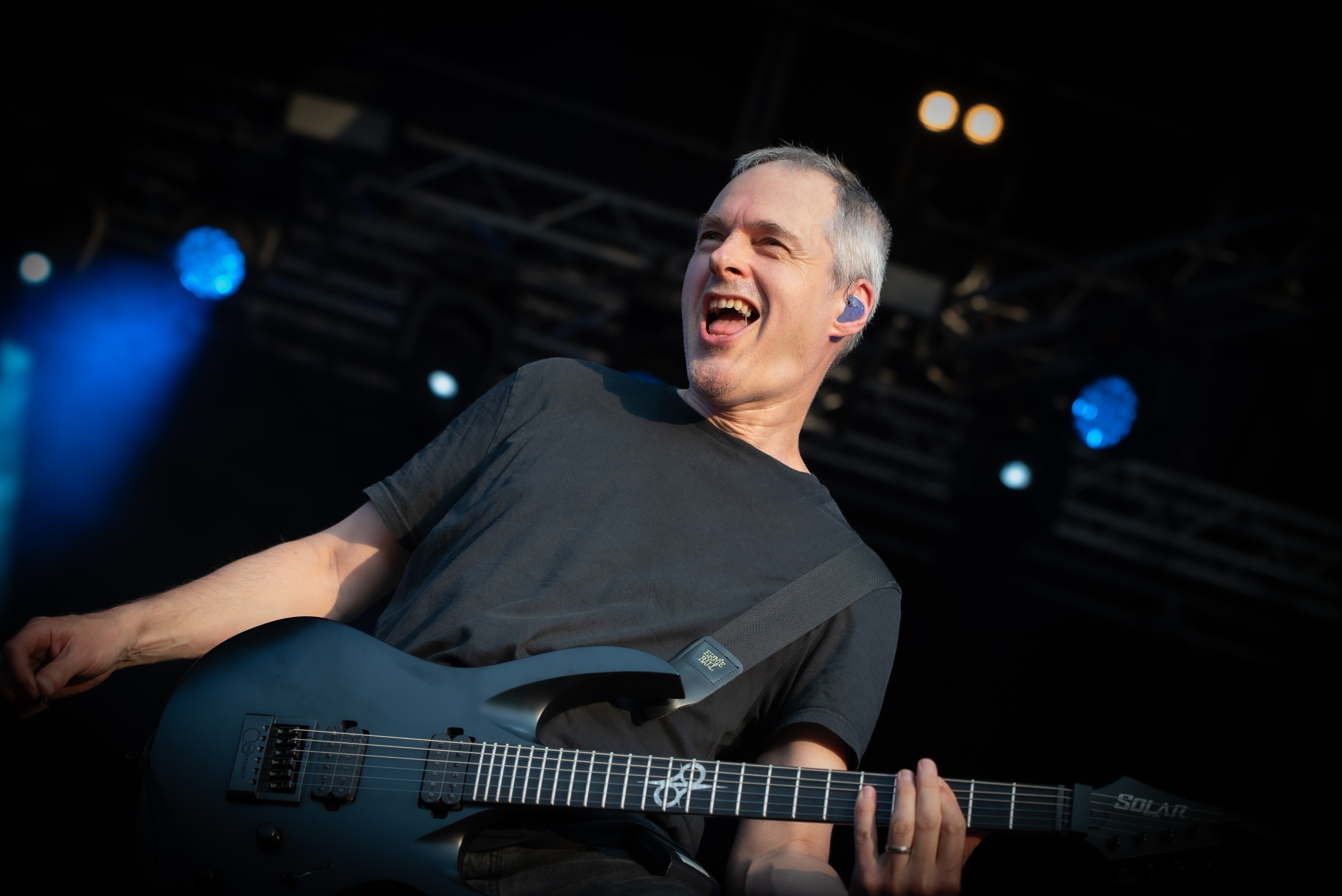
Karl Groom (2023)

Karl Groom is a British guitarist and record producer. He is best known as a founding and the only constant member of the progressive metal band Threshold. His production and mixing credits are mainly with progressive and power metal bands.

== Musician ==
Groom is the guitarist of Threshold, having formed the band in 1988. He has since produced and released twelve studio albums and is currently signed to Nuclear Blast. In addition, a live DVD entitled Critical Energy was released in 2004 whilst on the Inside Out Music label. Groom also played guitar in Mercy Train, Shadowland, and Strangers on a Train, all during the mid-1990s. In 2017, he played all acoustic guitars on Galahad's Quiet Storms album.

== Producer ==
Groom works from his own Thin Ice Studios since 1990. The recording facility was originally located in Berkshire, but moved to Surrey in 1995. He is mostly known for metal styles of production such as Threshold and DragonForce, but has also worked on progressive acts including YES, Pendragon, Edenbridge and John Wetton. The Strangers on a Train albums were rereleased in 2012 on the Polish Metal Mind Label.

- Strangers on a Train - The Key Part I: The Prophecy (1990) p/e/m
- Shadowland - Ring of Roses (1992) p/e/m
- Threshold – Wounded Land (1993) p/e/m
- Pendragon – The Window of Life (1993) e
- Strangers on a Train - The Key Part II: The Labyrinth (1993) p/e/m
- Ulysses - Neronia (1993) p/e/m
- Threshold – Psychedelicatessen (1994) p/e/m
- Shadowland - Through the Looking Glass (1994) p/e/m
- Pendragon – Utrecht... The Final Frontier (1995) p/e/m
- Pendragon – 'The Masquerade Overture (1996) p/e/m
- Shadowland - Mad as a Hatter (1996) p/e/m
- Threshold – Extinct Instinct (1997) p/e/m
- Pendragon – Utrecht... The Final Frontier (1995) p/e/m
- Pendragon – Live In Kraków 1996 (1997)
- Threshold – Clone (1998) p/e/m
- Martin Darvill and Friends - The Greatest Show on Earth - Parts 1 To 6 (1998) p/e
- Kooch (Cyrus Khajavi) - Zemzeme (2000) p/e/m
- DragonForce - Valley of the Damned (2003) p/e/m
- Threshold – Decadent (1999) p/e/m
- Threshold – Hypothetical (2001) p/e/m
- Pendragon – Not of This World (2001) p/e/m
- Threshold – Critical Mass (2002) p/e/m
- Threshold – Concert in Paris (2002) p/e/m
- Threshold – Wireless (2003) p/e/m
- John Wetton - Rock of Faith (2003) p/e/m
- Threshold – Subsurface (2004) p/e/m
- DragonForce - Sonic Firestorm (2004) p/e/m
- Threshold – Replica (2004) p/e/m
- Threshold – Critical Energy (2004) p/e/m
- Arena – Pepper's Ghost (2005) p/e/m
- Pendragon – Believe (2005) p/e/m
- Credo - Rhetoric (2005) m
- DragonForce - Inhuman Rampage (2006) p/e/m
- Threshold – Surface to Stage (2006) p/e/m
- Edenbridge – The Grand Design (2006) e/m/g
- Threshold – Dead Reckoning (2007) p/e/m
- Galahad (band) - Empires Never Last (2007) p/e/m
- Threshold – The Ravages of Time (2007) p/e/m
- Edenbridge – MyEarthDream (2008) e/m/g
- Trigger the Bloodshed - Purgation (2008) m
- DragonForce -Ultra Beatdown (2008) p/e/m
- Pendragon – Pure (2008) p/e/m
- Clive Nolan – She (2008) e/m
- Trigger the Bloodshed - The Great Depression (2009) m
- Threshold – Paradox: The Singles Collection (2009) p/e/m
- Pendragon – Concerto Maximo (2009) p/e/m
- Edenbridge – Solitaire (2010) e/m
- Kyrbgrinder - Cold War Technology (2010) p/e/m
- Yes – In the Present - Live from Lyon (2011) e/m
- Pendragon – Passion (2011)
- DragonForce - The Power Within (2012) p/e/m
- Galahad (band) - Battle Scars (2012) p/e/m/g
- Clive Nolan – Alchemy (2012) e/m
- Alan Reed - First in a Field of One (2012) p/e/m
- Galahad (band) - Beyond the Realms of Euphoria (2012) p/e/m
- Threshold – March of Progress (2012) p/e/m
- Twelfth Night - Live And Let Live | The Definitive Edition (2012) m
- Edenbridge – The Bonding (2013) e/m
- Clive Nolan – Alchemy DVD Live (2013) e/m
- Siren's Cry - Scattered Horizons (2013) m
- Engraved Disillusion - The Eternal Rest (2014) p/e/m
- Agnieszka Świta – Sleepless (2014) p/e/m
- Kyrbgrinder - Chronicles Of A Dark Machine (2015) p/e/m
- NightMare World - In The Fullness Of Time (2015) p/e/m
- Threshold - Legends of The Shires (2017) p/e/m
- Galahad (band) - Quiet Storms (2017) p/e/m
- Alan Reed - Honey On the Razor's Edge (2012) p/e/m
- The Windmill - Tribus (2018) m
- Galahad (band) - Seas of Change (2018) p/e/m
- The Far Meadow - Foreign Land (2019) p/e/m
- Koburg - The Enchantress (2019) m
- Onslaught - Generation Antichrist (2020) e/p
- Awake By Design - Awake By Design (2020) p/e/m
- Pendragon - Love Over Fear (2020) e
- Koburg - Position Of Power (2020) m
- Infinitome - Voyage Home (2021) m
- Grace and Fire - Elysium (2021) p/m
- Infinitome - Beyond the Beyond(2022) m
- Galahad (band) - The Last Great Adventurer (2022) p/e/m
- Threshold - Dividing Lines (2022) p/e/m
- Drallion - New Machine (2022) p/e/m
- Galahad (band) - The Long Goodbye (2023) p/e/m
- The Windmill - Mindscapes (2024) m
- Galahad (band) - Alive at Loreley (2025) p/e/m
- Ark Ascent - Empyrean Veil (2026) p/e/m
- Clive Nolan keyboardist of Pendragon - The Mortal Light (2026) p/e/m
- Yes - From A Page (Expanded Edition) (2026) p/e/m
- Edenbridge – Set the Dark on Fire (2026) p/e/m

p – produced, e – engineered, m – mixed, g – guest musician
