= Wounded Land (album) =

Studio album by Threshold
- Released: 2 August 1993
- Recorded: 1993
- Genre: Progressive metal
- Length: 57:30
- Label: Giant Electric Pea; InsideOut Music
- Producer: Karl Groom

Threshold chronology
Cult of the Immortal (demo) (1991)	Wounded Land (1993)	Psychedelicatessen (1994)

Professional ratings
Review scores
Source	Rating
AllMusic	2.5/5 stars
Imperiumi	7.5/10 stars
Metal.de	8/10
Music Waves	4/5
Powermetal.de	10/10
Stormbringer	4/5

Wounded Land is the debut album from British progressive metal band Threshold, released in 1993. It is the first of four non-consecutive albums to feature vocalist Damian Wilson, who returned for 1997's Extinct Instinct, then returned again for 2012's March of Progress and 2014's For the Journey, and the only one to feature Tony Grinham on drums. It was re-released as a special edition in 2001 by InsideOut Music and in 2012 as a definitive edition by Nuclear Blast.

The songs deal with the issues of environmental destruction, drug abuse, the Gulf War and, in the bonus track "Intervention," the Bosnian War.

== Track listing ==
No.	Title	Writer(s)	Length
1.	"Consume to Live"	Groom/Midson/Jeary	8:13
2.	"Days of Dearth"	Groom/Midson/Jeary	5:28
3.	"Sanity's End"	Groom/Midson/Jeary	10:23
4.	"Paradox"	Groom/Midson/Jeary	7:17
5.	"Surface to Air"	Groom/Midson/Jeary	10:16
6.	"Mother Earth"	Groom/Midson/Jeary	5:54
7.	"Siege of Baghdad"	Groom/Midson/Jeary	7:44
8.	"Keep It with Mine"	Groom/Midson/Jeary	2:28

Bonus tracks
No.	Title	Length
1.	"Intervention" (special edition 2001, definitive edition 2012)	6:38
2.	"Conceal the Face" (definitive edition 2012)	5:03
3.	"Shifting Sands" (definitive edition 2012)	3:41

- The track "Intervention" appears on both the 2001 special edition and the 2012 definitive edition. The tracks "Conceal the Face" and "Shifting Sands" appear on the latter re-release.
- "Intervention" first appeared on a Dutch progressive rock compilation album in 1992 and was the band's first professional release. "Conceal the Face" and "Shifting Sands" are re-recordings of songs from their 1991 demo Cult of the Immortal; both songs previously appeared on the 2009 "Paradox" box set.
- Additionally, the 2001 special edition release of the album contains demo recordings of "Paradox" and "Days of Dearth" from this album, and the early song "Conceal the Face", which appeared on the single for "Paradox", and eventually saw release in acoustic form on the fan club album Wireless. Each of the demo recordings features singing from Jon Jeary, the band's original bassist and lead vocalist.

== Special edition features ==
- Extended booklet with slipcase and liner notes
- Bonus track "Intervention" (1992 version)
- Multimedia section including introductory notes, demo versions ("Days of Dearth", "Paradox", "Conceal the Face" - previously unreleased), screensaver, photo gallery, hidden track

== Personnel ==
- Damian Wilson – lead vocals
- Karl Groom – lead guitar, backing vocals
- Nick Midson – guitar
- Jon Jeary – bass, acoustic guitar, backing vocals
- Richard West – keyboard, piano
- Tony Grinham – drums
