= Surface to Stage =

Live album by Threshold
- Released: 2006
- Recorded: 17 September 2004 Pratteln, Switzerland
- Genre: Progressive metal
- Length: 72:00
- Label: NSM
- Producer: Karl Groom, Richard West

Threshold chronology
| Replica (2004) | Surface to Stage (2006) | Dead Reckoning (2007) |

Surface to Stage is a live album by Threshold, its fifth Direct-to-Fan release, released on the band's website in 2006. The CD contains a concert recorded at the Z7 in Pratteln, Switzerland on their tour for the album Subsurface.

On 3 September 2021, an expanded edition of the album was released as a double CD, restoring the songs "Freaks", "The Ravages Of Time", and "Fragmentation".

The album's title is a double entendre making reference to the song "Surface to Air" from the 1993 Wounded Land, and Subsurface.

== Track listing ==
1. "Mission Profile" (8:22)
2. "Ground Control" (7:12)
3. "Into the Light" (8:51)
4. "Echoes of Life" (8:28)
5. "Long Way Home" (5:57)
6. "Opium" (6:29)
7. "The Art of Reason" (10:06)
8. "Pressure" (5:22)
9. "Flags and Footprints" (5:10)
10. "Light and Space" (6:05)

== Personnel ==
- Mac – vocals
- Karl Groom – guitars, backing vocals
- Nick Midson – guitars
- Richard West – keyboards, backing vocals
- Steve Anderson – bass, backing vocals
- Johanne James – drums
