= Subsurface (album) =

Studio album by Threshold
- Released: 3 August 2004
- Recorded: 2004
- Genre: Progressive metal
- Length: 62:48
- Label: InsideOut Music
- Producer: Karl Groom; Richard West

Threshold chronology
Critical Mass (2002)	Subsurface (2004)	Dead Reckoning (2007)

Professional ratings
Review scores
Source	Rating
Imperiumi	10/10 stars
Rock Hard	8.5/10

Subsurface is the seventh studio album by British progressive metal band Threshold. It was released in August 2004, and received an Album of the Month award in several European music magazines. It is the last album to feature founding member and guitarist Nick Midson.

Songs on the album resume themes from earlier albums, including environmentalism and war, but also incorporating political themes.

== Reception ==
In 2005, Subsurface was ranked number 472 in Rock Hard magazine's book The 500 Greatest Rock & Metal Albums of All Time.

== Track listing ==
No.	Title	Writer(s)	Length
1.	"Mission Profile"	Karl Groom, Richard West	8:15
2.	"Ground Control"	West	7:13
3.	"Opium"	Groom, West	6:48
4.	"Stop Dead"	West	4:21
5.	"The Art of Reason"	Groom, West	10:20
6.	"Pressure"	Groom, Nick Midson, West	5:17
7.	"Flags and Footprints"	West	4:54
8.	"Static"	Groom, West	5:07
9.	"The Destruction of Words"	Groom, West	6:14
10.	"What About Me" (bonus track)	Johanne James	4:19
Total length:			62:48

== Personnel ==
- Steve Anderson – bass guitar
- Karl Groom – rhythm and solo guitar
- Johanne James – drums
- Andrew "Mac" McDermott – vocals
- Nick Midson – rhythm guitar
- Richard West – keyboards
