= Subsurface (disambiguation) =

Subsurface may refer to:

- Subterranea (geography)
- Underwater
- Bedrock, consolidated rock beneath a planet's surface
- Subsurface (album), 2004 album by British band Threshold
- Subsurface (software), divelog software
