= Songs from the Lion's Cage =

Studio album by Arena
- Released: 6 February 1995
- Recorded: July–October 1994
- Studio: Orchard Farm Studios; Thin Ice Studios; Arena Studios
- Genre: Neo-progressive rock
- Length: 58:14
- Label: Verglas Music; Griffin Music (US/Canada)
- Producer: Mike Stobbie

Arena chronology
Songs from the Lion's Cage (1995)	Pride (1996)

Professional ratings
Review scores
Source	Rating
Allmusic	3/5 stars

Songs from the Lion's Cage is the debut album of British Progressive rock group Arena, released in February 1995. This is the only Arena album to feature vocalist John Carson and bassist Cliff Orsi.

== Track listing ==
All songs by Clive Nolan & Mick Pointer

1. "Out of the Wilderness" - 8:02
2. "Crying for Help I" - 1:22
3. "Valley of the Kings" - 10:10
4. "Crying for Help II" - 3:08
5. "Jericho" - 6:50
6. "Crying for Help III" - 4:24
7. "Midas Vision" - 4:36
8. "Crying for Help IV" - 5:05
9. "Solomon" - 14:37

From Irond Ltd label edition - 2004

1. "Chosen" - Live - 6:31
2. "Elea" - Live - 2:36
3. "Friday's Dream" - Live - 4:33

== Personnel ==
- Clive Nolan - Keyboards
- Mick Pointer - Drums
- John Carson - Vocals
- Keith More - Guitars
- Cliff Orsi - Bass
- Steve Rothery - Guest Guitar Solo on "Crying For Help IV"
