= NightMare World =

English power metal band

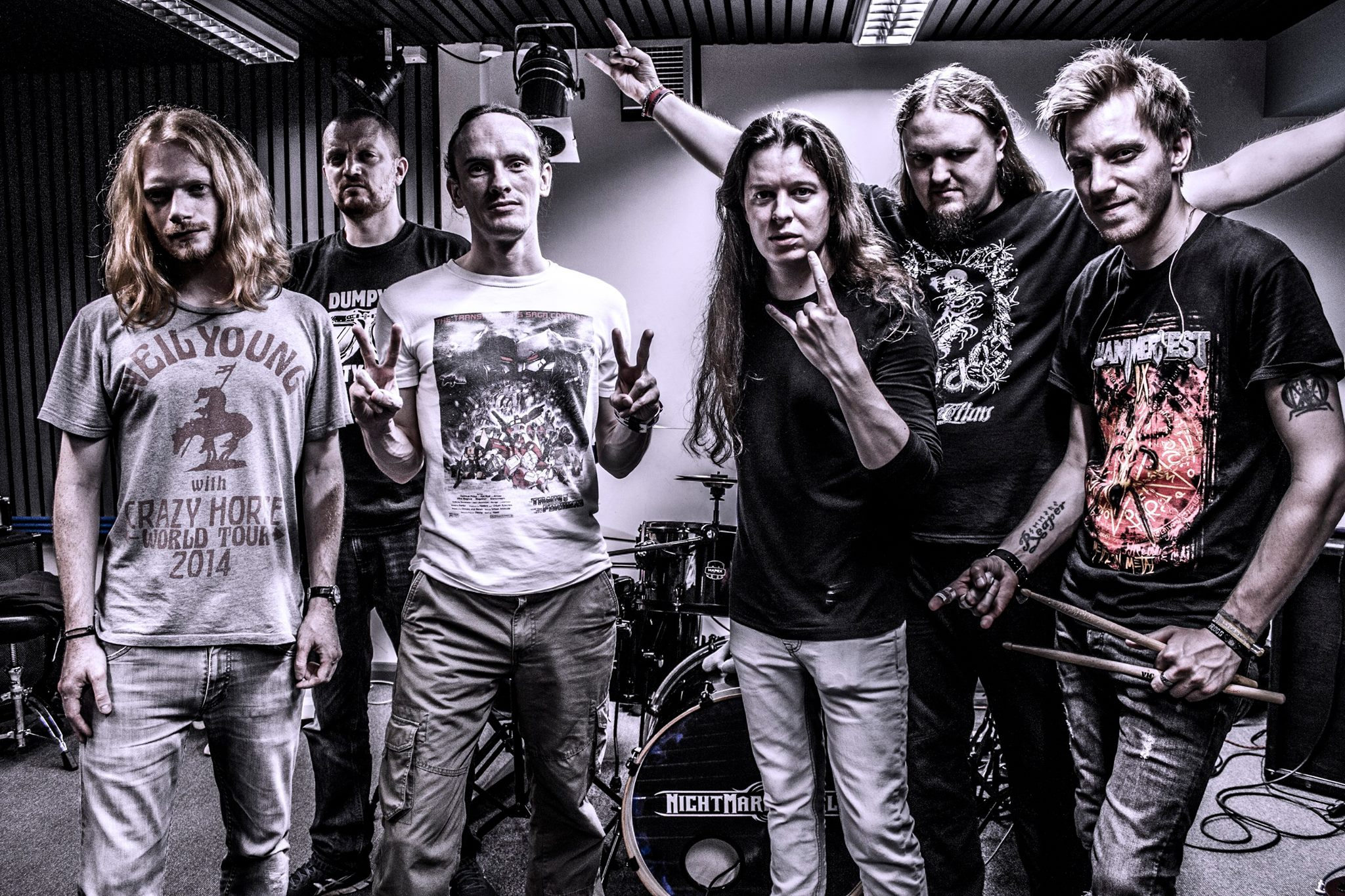
- NightMare World 2017

Background information
- Origin: Birmingham, England
- Genres: Power Metal
- Years active: 2006–2017
- Label: Pure Steel Records
- Past members: Pete Morten; Sam Shuttlewood; Joe Cleary; David Moorcroft; Nick Clarke; Chris Allan
- Website: www.nightmareworld.co.uk

NightMare World were an English power metal band from Birmingham, England, formed in 2006.

== History ==
=== No Regrets EP ===
In 2007 NightMare World recorded a three-track EP at Thin Ice Studios. It was engineered, produced and mixed by Karl Groom of Threshold and was released in early 2009. All three tracks were later reproduced entirely on the band's debut album, In The Fullness of Time. The band played a few select shows including Bloodstock 2009 promoting the EP.

=== In The Fullness of Time ===
The band began work on their debut album in early 2010 and chose to continue working with Karl Groom at Thin Ice Studios. The album was recorded over a period of four years and was finally mastered by Peter Van't Riet in April 2014. The album also featured orchestration by Daniel Reeves, AKA Casino Brown (Ted Maul, Akercocke). Shortly after, the band signed to Pure Steel Records and the album was released on 15 May 2015.

Amongst other dates, the band performed at Hammerfest IX, and supporting Powerquest at the Camden Underworld.

=== Future ===
NightMare World have stated on social media that they are currently writing a second studio album. They had also stated that they would be recording with producer Chris Tsangarides. However, since Tsangarides' death in 2018 they have returned to original producer Karl Groom, recording drums at Thin Ice Studios and then mixing at Aubit Studios.

== Band members ==
=== Last lineup ===
- Pete Morten - vocals (2007–2017)
- Sam Shuttlewood - lead guitar (2006–2017)
- David Moorcroft - bass guitar (2010–2017)

=== Former ===
- Billy Jeffs - drums (2006–2020)
- Anthony Thompson - keyboard (2017–2020)
- Jimi Nix - lead vocals (2006–2007)
- Georgia Levermore - thythm guitar (2006–2007)
- Alex Baker - bass guitar (2006–2009)

== Discography ==
Studio albums

- In The Fullness of Time (album) (2015)

EPs

- No Regrets (EP) (2009)
