= Extinct Instinct =

Studio album by Threshold
- Released: 10 March 1997
- Recorded: 1996
- Genre: Progressive metal
- Length: 67:11
- Label: Giant Electric Pea; InsideOut Music
- Producer: Karl Groom; Richard West

Threshold chronology
Psychedelicatessen (1994)	Extinct Instinct (1997)	Clone (1998)

Professional ratings
Review scores
Source	Rating
Metal.de	7/10
Powermetal.de	8.5/10
Stormbringer	5/5

Extinct Instinct is the third studio album by British progressive metal band Threshold, released in 1997. It is the first album to feature drummer Mark Heaney and the second to feature vocalist Damian Wilson, his first album with the band being their 1993 debut, Wounded Land. The album was rereleased in 2004 as a special edition with three bonus tracks; unlike the previous two albums, this edition did not include a multimedia section of any kind.

The songs on the album resume the themes of war and environmentalism found on Wounded Land, and also introduce themes of human self-absorption and isolation. The middle segment of the song "The Whispering" makes extensive direct reference to Wounded Land's opening song, "Consume to Live."

== Track listing ==
No.	Title	Writer(s)	Length
1.	"Exposed"	Groom, Jeary, Midson	6:27
2.	"Somatography"	Groom, Jeary	6:26
3.	"Eat the Unicorn"	Groom, Jeary	10:06
4.	"Forever"	West	4:35
5.	"Virtual Isolation"	Groom, Jeary	5:33
6.	"The Whispering"	West	7:50
7.	"Lake of Despond"	Groom, Jeary	6:22
8.	"Clear"	Groom, West, Wilson	3:22
9.	"Life Flow"	Groom, Jeary	6:00
10.	"Part of the Chaos"	Groom, Jeary, Midson	10:30

=== Notes ===
- The song "Part of the Chaos" ends at 8:20. After 30 seconds of silence (8:20 – 8:50), the hidden song "Segue" begins.

2004 Special Edition Bonus Tracks
No.	Title	Writer(s)	Length
11.	"Mansion" (Japanese bonus track)	Wilson	3:00
12.	"Exposed (Radio Edit)" (Taken from the fan club release Decadent)	Groom, Jeary, Midson	4:37
13.	"Virtual Isolation" (Edit)	Groom, Jeary	3:54

2012 Definitive Edition Bonus Tracks
No.	Title	Length
12.	"Virtual Isolation (Radio Version)" (Similar edit to the one found on Decadent, but with added effects)	4:18
13.	"Smile at the Moon" (A newly recorded version of a song written for the album but cut before recording)	3:45

=== Notes ===
- The 2012 Definitive Edition released by Nuclear Blast includes "Mansion," but replaces the other two tracks with the following:

== Special edition features ==
- Extended booklet with slipcase and liner notes
- Remastered with three bonus tracks

== Personnel ==
- Damian Wilson – vocals
- Karl Groom – guitars, backing vocals
- Nick Midson – guitars
- Jon Jeary – bass, acoustic guitar, backing vocals
- Richard West – keyboards, backing vocals
- Mark Heaney – drums
