= Legends of the Shires =

Studio album by Threshold
- Released: 8 September 2017
- Recorded: 2017
- Studio: Thin Ice Studios, Surrey, England
- Genre: Progressive metal
- Length: 82:14
- Label: Nuclear Blast
- Producer: Karl Groom; Richard West

Threshold chronology
European Journey (2015)	Legends of the Shires (2017)	Dividing Lines (2022)

Legends of the Shires is the eleventh studio album by progressive metal band Threshold, released on September 8, 2017. It is the first album to feature vocalist Glynn Morgan since the band's second album Psychedelicatessen in 1994; Morgan returned to Threshold following Damian Wilson's departure in 2017.

The album is a concept album about "a nation trying to find itself" according to lyricist Richard West. However, they admit that their intent in many cases was to have 2 different parallel stories or interpretations—for example, in addition to the nation-based theme, that the songs be just as applicable on a personal level.

== Track listing ==
All tracks written by Karl Groom and Richard West, except where noted.

=== Disc one ===
No.	Title	Length
1.	"The Shire (Part 1)"	2:04
2.	"Small Dark Lines"	5:25
3.	"The Man Who Saw Through Time" (Richard West)	11:52
4.	"Trust the Process"	8:44
5.	"Stars and Satellites" (Richard West)	7:21
6.	"On the Edge" (Steve Anderson)	5:21

=== Disc two ===
No.	Title	Length
1.	"The Shire (Part 2)"	5:25
2.	"Snowblind"	7:04
3.	"Subliminal Freeways" (Richard West)	4:52
4.	"State of Independence" (Richard West)	3:38
5.	"Superior Machine"	5:01
6.	"The Shire (Part 3)"	1:23
7.	"Lost in Translation"	10:20
8.	"Swallowed" (Richard West)	3:54
Total length:		1:22:24

== Personnel ==
Taken from the liner notes of the album.

Threshold

- Glynn Morgan – vocals
- Karl Groom – guitars, production, mixing
- Richard West – keyboards, production
- Steve Anderson – bass
- Johanne James – drums

Additional personnel

- Jon Jeary – vocals on "The Shire (Part 3)"
- Mika Jussila – mastering
- Elena Dudina – cover image
- Rob Burress – band photography

== Charts ==
Chart (2017)	Peak position
Austrian Albums (Ö3 Austria)	31
Belgian Albums (Ultratop Flanders)	182
Belgian Albums (Ultratop Wallonia)	167
French Albums (SNEP)	163
German Albums (Offizielle Top 100)	13
Scottish Albums (OCC)	56
Swiss Albums (Schweizer Hitparade)	14
UK Albums (OCC)	90
