= Clone (Threshold album) =

Studio album by Threshold
- Released: 20 November 1998
- Recorded: January 1998
- Genre: Progressive metal
- Length: 58:38
- Label: Giant Electric Pea
- Producer: Karl Groom; Richard West

Threshold chronology
Extinct Instinct (1997)	Clone (1998)	Hypothetical (2001)

Professional ratings
Review scores
Source	Rating
Metal.de	9/10
Music Waves	4/5
Powermetal.de	9/10
Stormbringer	5/5

Clone is the fourth studio album by the British progressive metal band Threshold, released in 1998. It is the first album with the long time singer Andrew "Mac" McDermott and the final one with the drummer Mark Heaney. In October 2012, Nuclear Blast released a "Definitive Edition", including three bonus tracks.

== Track listing ==
No.	Title	Writer(s)	Length
1.	"Freaks"	Groom, Jeary	5:23
2.	"Angels"	Groom, Midson, West	6:42
3.	"The Latent Gene"	Groom, Jeary	8:00
4.	"Lovelorn"	Groom, Jeary	5:41
5.	"Change"	West	4:33
6.	"Life's Too Good"	Groom, Jeary, Midson	5:27
7.	"Goodbye Mother Earth"	West	7:58
8.	"Voyager II"	Groom, Jeary	9:04
9.	"Sunrise On Mars"	West	5:47

2012 reissue bonus tracks
No.	Title	Length
10.	"Freaks (Live in Paris)" (originally included on Concert in Paris)	5:24
11.	"Change (Live in Paris)" (originally included on Concert in Paris)	4:43
12.	"The Latent Gene (Uncut Version)" (originally included on Replica)	9:12

== Personnel ==
- Andrew "Mac" McDermott – lead vocals
- Karl Groom – guitar/acoustic
- Nick Midson – guitar/acoustic
- Jon Jeary – bass guitar
- Richard West – keyboards
- Mark Heaney – drums

Definitive edition bonus tracks:

- Johanne James – drums
