= Critical Mass (Threshold album) =

Studio album by Threshold
- Released: 2 September 2002
- Recorded: March 2002 – June 2002
- Genre: Progressive metal
- Length: 59:55
- Label: InsideOut Music
- Producer: Karl Groom; Richard West

Threshold chronology
Hypothetical (2001)	Critical Mass (2002)	Subsurface (2004)

Professional ratings
Review scores
Source	Rating
AllMusic	4/5 stars
DPRP	7.5/10
Imperiumi	8.5/10 stars

Critical Mass is the sixth album by British progressive metal band Threshold. It was recorded in early 2002 and released in September. It is also the last album to feature original bassist Jon Jeary, who left immediately after the release. He was replaced by Steve Anderson, who appears on the live album Critical Energy and subsequent albums.

== Track listing ==
No.	Title	Writer(s)	Length
1.	"Phenomenon"	Richard West	5:28
2.	"Choices"	Karl Groom, Jon Jeary	8:19
3.	"Falling Away"	West	6:53
4.	"Fragmentation"	Groom, Jeary	6:34
5.	"Echoes of Life"	West	8:55
6.	"Round and Round"	Groom, Jeary	5:26
7.	"Avalon"	West	4:45
8.	"Critical Mass": I. "Fission"; II. "Fusion"; III. "Lucky"	Groom, Jeary	13:35
Total length:			59:55

Limited Edition Bonus Tracks
No.	Title	Writer(s)	Length
9.	"Phenomenon (Radio Edit)"	West	3:47
10.	"Do Unto Them"	Andrew McDermott	4:26
11.	"New Beginning"	Nick Midson	5:43
Total length:			73:51

== Notes ==
- The song "Round and Round" contains a quote from The Hitch-Hiker's Guide to the Galaxy.
- The song "New Beginning" contains a quote from the I Ching Hexagram 32.

== Personnel ==
- Andrew "Mac" McDermott – vocals
- Johanne James – drums
- Jon Jeary – bass
- Karl Groom – guitar
- Nick Midson – guitar
- Richard West – keyboards
