= Pepper's ghost (disambiguation) =

Pepper's ghost is an illusionary technique.

Pepper's Ghost may also refer to:

- Pepper's Ghost (band), American rock band from Philadelphia
- Pepper's Ghost (Buckethead album), 2007
- Pepper's Ghost (Arena album), 2005

== See also ==
- Ghost pepper
