= Critical Energy =

Live album by Threshold
- Released: 3 February 2004
- Recorded: 2003
- Genre: Progressive metal
- Length: 1:57:15
- Label: InsideOut Music
- Producer: Karl Groom, Richard West

Threshold chronology
| Critical Mass (2002) | Critical Energy (2004) | Subsurface (2004) |

Critical Energy is a live album by Threshold, released in 2004.

== Track list ==
=== Disc 1 ===
1. "Phenomenon" (6.06)
2. "Oceanbound" (6.25)
3. "Choices" (8.41)
4. "Angels" (6.47)
5. "Falling Away" (7.09)
6. "Virtual Isolation" (6.10)
7. "Innocent" (4.21)
8. "Long Way Home" (6.06)
9. "Fragmentation" (7.00)

=== Disc 2 ===
1. "Clear" (3.41)
2. "Life Flow" (3.53)
3. "Narcissus" (6.03)
4. "Sunseeker" (5.25)
5. "The Latent Gene" (7.57)
6. "Light And Space" (6.15)
7. "Sunrise On Mars" (5.29)
8. "Paradox" (9.25)
9. "Sanity's End" (10.16)

== DVD features ==
- Complete concert footage (approx. 2 hours)
- Stereo and 5.1 surround sound
- Commentary by Karl Groom and Richard West
- Critical Moments tour documentary
- Additional concert footage from ProgPower USA 2002:

Light And Space / The Latent Gene / The Ravages Of Time

- Photo gallery by Sy Wooks Seddon

== Musicians ==
- Andrew McDermott – vocals
- Karl Groom – guitar
- Nick Midson – guitar
- Richard West – keyboard
- Steve Anderson – bass guitar
- Johanne James – drums
