= Hypothetical (album) =

Studio album by Threshold
- Released: 20 March 2001
- Recorded: 2000
- Genre: Progressive metal
- Length: 55:58
- Label: InsideOut Music
- Producer: Karl Groom; Richard West

Threshold chronology
Clone (1998)	Hypothetical (2001)	Critical Mass (2002)

Professional ratings
Review scores
Source	Rating
AllMusic	3/5 stars

Hypothetical is the fifth studio album by British progressive metal band Threshold. The album was released on 20 March 2001. This is the first album to feature current drummer Johanne James, who had previously played with the band on tour.

== Track listing ==
No.	Title	Writer(s)	Length
1.	"Light and Space"	West	5:58
2.	"Turn On Tune In"	Groom, Jeary	6:12
3.	"The Ravages of Time"	Groom, Jeary	10:17
4.	"Sheltering Sky"	West	5:35
5.	"Oceanbound"	West	6:42
6.	"Long Way Home"	West, Midson	6:00
7.	"Keep My Head"	West	4:01
8.	"Narcissus"	Groom, Jeary	11:13
Total length:			55:58

Limited Edition Bonus Track
No.	Title	Writer(s)	Length
9.	"Life Flow (Acoustic Version)"	Groom, Jeary	3:28
Total length:			59:26

== Personnel ==
- Karl Groom – guitar
- Johanne James – drums
- Jon Jeary – bass
- Andrew "Mac" McDermott – vocals
- Nick Midson – guitar
- Richard West – keyboards
- Holger Haubold - backing vocals on "Narcissus"
