= Dividing Lines =

Studio album by Threshold
- Released: 18 November 2022
- Studio: Thin Ice Studios
- Genre: Progressive metal
- Length: 64:52
- Label: Nuclear Blast
- Producer: Karl Groom; Richard West

Threshold chronology
Legends of the Shires (2017)	Dividing Lines (2022)

Dividing Lines is the twelfth studio album by progressive metal band Threshold, released on 18 November 2022.

== Track listing ==
No.	Title	Writer(s)	Length
1.	"Haunted"	Richard West	5:06
2.	"Hall of Echoes"	Karl Groom; West	6:17
3.	"Let It Burn"	Glynn Morgan	6:49
4.	"Silenced"	West	4:37
5.	"The Domino Effect"	West	11:03
6.	"Complex"	Groom; West	5:50
7.	"King of Nothing"	Morgan	5:08
8.	"Lost Along the Way"	West	5:19
9.	"Run"	Morgan	3:59
10.	"Defence Condition"	Groom; West	10:44
Total length:			64:52

== Personnel ==
Threshold

- Glynn Morgan – vocals
- Karl Groom – guitars, production, mixing, mastering
- Richard West – keyboards, production
- Steve Anderson – bass
- Johanne James – drums

Production

- Masiha Fattahi – cover image
- Robert Burress – band photography
- Eightspace – sleeve design

== Charts ==
Chart performance for Dividing Lines
Chart (2022)	Peak position
Austrian Albums (Ö3 Austria)	67
German Albums (Offizielle Top 100)	34
Scottish Albums (OCC)	76
Swiss Albums (Schweizer Hitparade)	14
UK Rock & Metal Albums (OCC)	9
