= Johanne James =

British drummer and vocalist

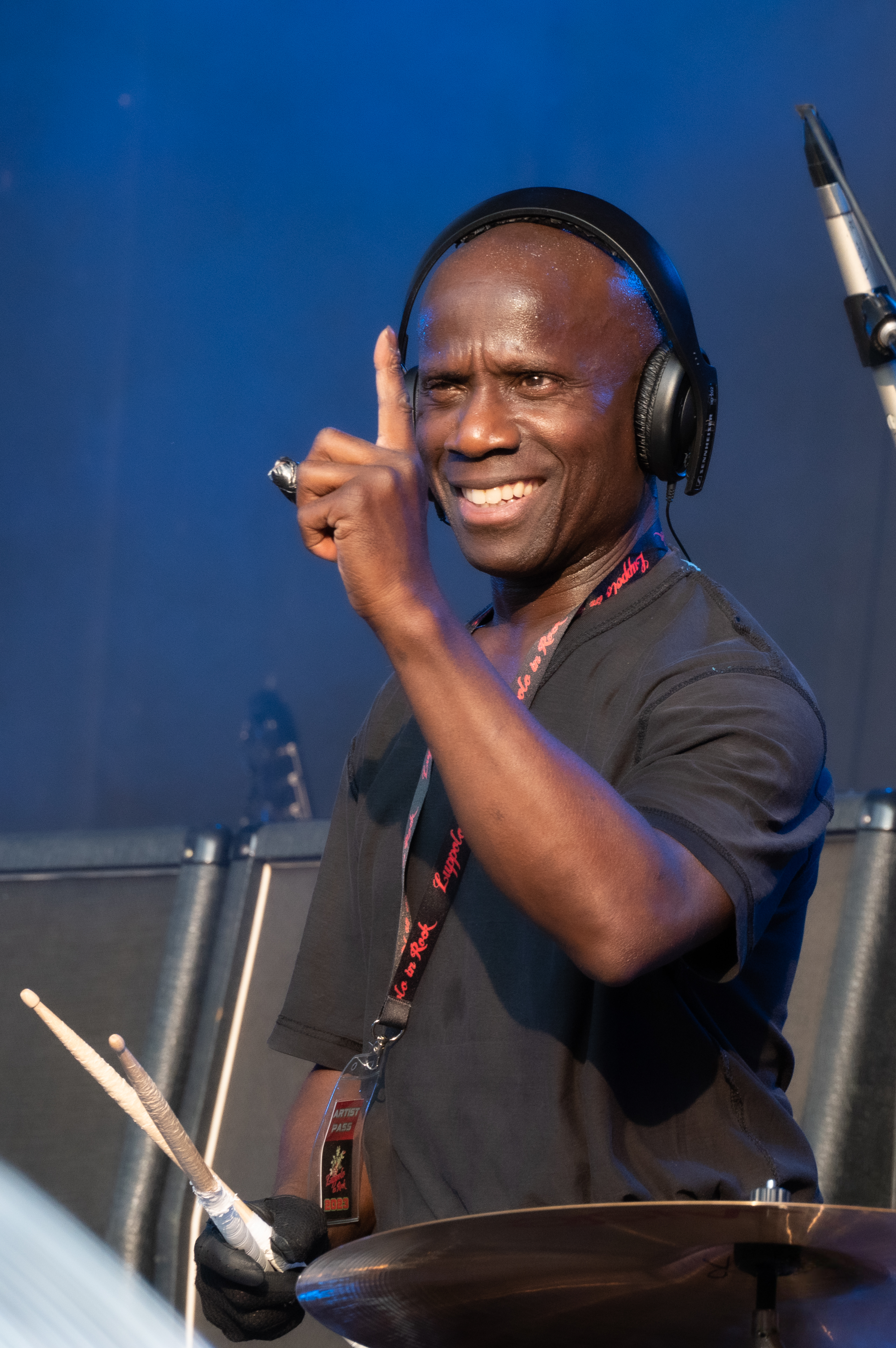
Johanne James with Threshold in 2023

Johanne James is the drummer for British progressive metal band Threshold. He joined the band officially, replacing Mark Heaney, in 2001, to record the album Hypothetical, which occurred after having toured with the band in support of the albums Extinct Instinct and Clone. He also fronts the three-piece band Kyrbgrinder, in which he is the vocalist and drummer. He is also the drummer for Symphony of Pain. He has been awarded Best Drummer by the Classic Rock Society five times, in 2004, 2006, 2007, 2008 and 2014.

== Discography ==
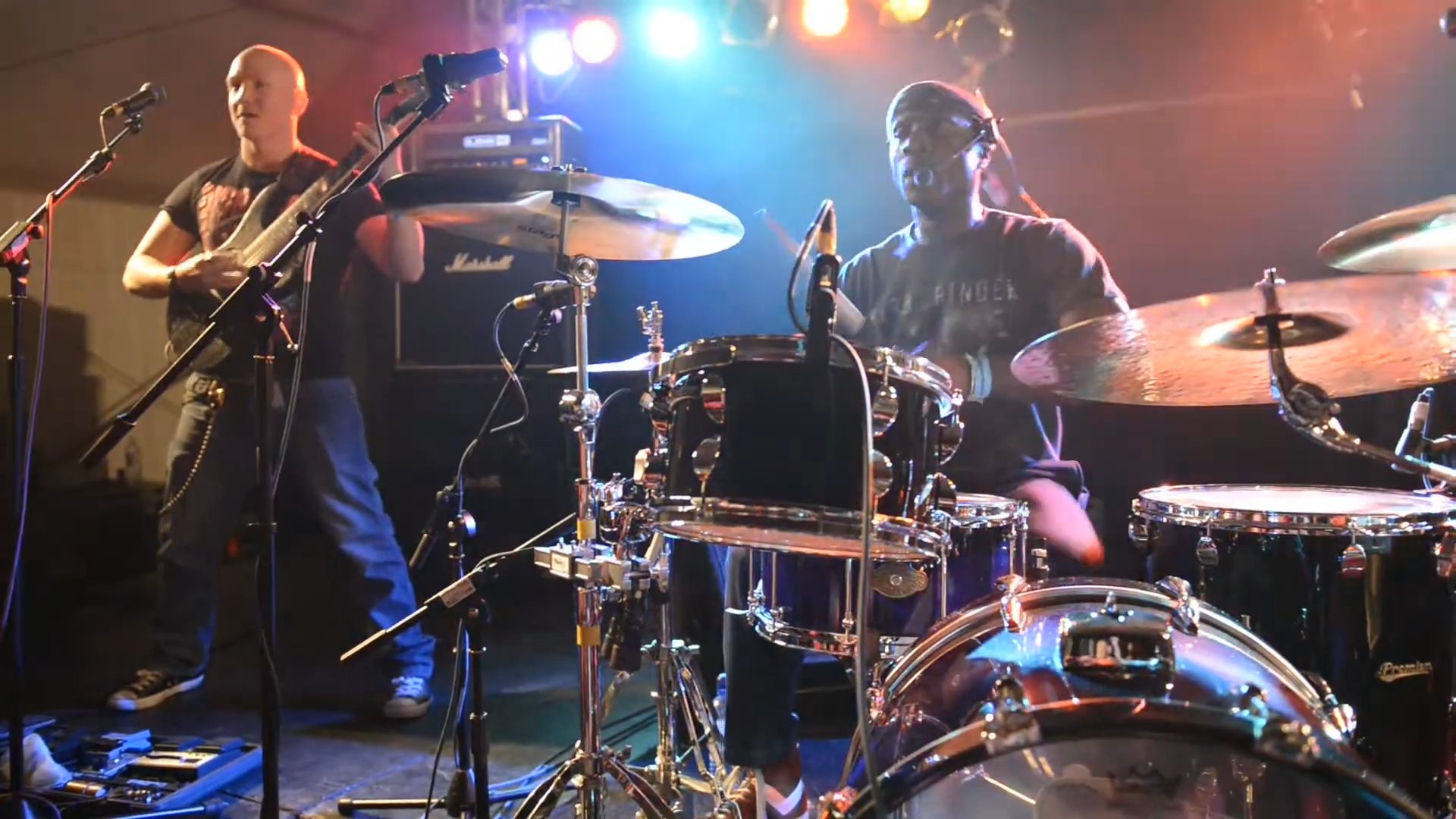
James with Krybgrinder in 2015

=== With Threshold ===
- Hypothetical (full-length, 2001)
- Concert in Paris (live album, 2002)
- Critical Mass (full-length, 2002)
- Wireless (remix album, 2003)
- Critical Energy (live album, 2004)
- Subsurface (full-length, 2004)
- Surface to Stage (live album, 2006)
- "Pressure" (single, 2006)
- "Pilot in the Sky of Dreams" (single, 2007)
- Dead Reckoning (full-length, 2007)
- March of Progress (full-length, 2012)
- For the Journey (full-length, 2014)
- Legends of the Shires (full-length, 2017)
- Dividing Lines (full-length, 2022)

=== With Kyrbgrinder ===
- Defiance (full-length, 2007)
- Cold War Technology (full-length, 2010)
- Chronicles of a Dark Machine (full-length, 2015)

=== With Symphony Of Pain ===
- Virology (full-length, 2019)

=== with Ayreon ===
- Transitus (full-length, 2020)
