= For the Journey =

Studio album by Threshold
- Released: 19 September 2014 (Europe); 22 September 2014 (UK); 30 September 2014 (US)
- Recorded: 2014
- Genre: Progressive metal
- Length: 59:21
- Label: Nuclear Blast

Threshold chronology
March of Progress (2012)	For the Journey (2014)	European Journey (2015)

Professional ratings
Review scores
Source	Rating
Blabbermouth	9/10
LouderSound	3.5/5 stars

For the Journey is the tenth studio album by progressive metal band Threshold. It is the fourth and last studio album to feature lead vocalist Damian Wilson, the second and last to feature second guitarist Pete Morten and their third album on their current label, Nuclear Blast.

== Track listing ==
No.	Title	Writer(s)	Length
1.	"Watchtower on the Moon"	Karl Groom, Richard West	5:32
2.	"Unforgiven"	Groom, West	5:37
3.	"The Box"	Groom, West	11:59
4.	"Turned to Dust"	West	4:19
5.	"Lost in your Memory"	West	4:36
6.	"Autumn Red"	West	5:41
7.	"The Mystery Show"	Groom, West	5:37
8.	"Siren Sky"	Pete Morten	6:10
9.	"I Wish I Could" (Digipack Bonus Track)	Johanne James	5:28
Total length:			59:21

== Personnel ==
=== Members ===
- Damian Wilson – lead vocals, backing vocals
- Karl Groom – guitar, backing vocals
- Richard West – keyboards, backing vocals
- Johanne James – drums
- Steve Anderson – bass guitar, backing vocals
- Pete Morten – guitar

=== Production ===
- Karl Groom and Richard West – production
- Karl Groom – mixing
- Mika Jussila – mastering
