= The Shining (band) =

English rock supergroup

- Origin: Wigan, England
- Genres: Alternative rock, psychedelic rock
- Years active: 2000–2003
- Label: Zuma Recordings
- Past members: John Squire; Duncan Baxter; Dan MacBean; Mark Heaney; Simon Jones; Simon Tong

The Shining were an English rock supergroup formed in 2000. The band was composed of Duncan Baxter (vocals), Dan MacBean (guitar), Mark Heaney (drums), Simon Jones (bass), and Simon Tong (guitar, keyboards), the latter two both being members of The Verve.

The band originally featured former Stone Roses and The Seahorses guitarist John Squire under the name John Squire's Skunkworks, however he chose to leave the group early in the band's lifetime and later the name was changed to The Shining. The Shining released three singles throughout 2002, all of which were minor successes. Their one and only LP, titled True Skies and produced by Youth, followed in September of the same year, issued by Zuma Recordings. The band split in 2003.

== Discography ==
=== Albums ===
- True Skies (16 September 2002)
  - Zuma Records ZUMACD001
  1. "Quicksilver" – 3:59
  2. "Young Again" – 5:12
  3. "Find a Reason" – 3:41
  4. "Crest of an Ocean" – 5:09
  5. "Show You the Way" – 5:28
  6. "I Wonder How" – 4:44
  7. "I Am the One" – 3:44
  8. "Danger" – 4:03
  9. "Find Your Way Home" – 5:07
  10. "What You See" – 4:39
  11. "Until the End" – 9:43
  12. "Quicksilver" (Outro) – 1:50
  13. "Prove Love" (Japanese Bonus Tracks) – 4:47
  14. "Headspin" (Japanese Bonus Tracks) – 5:30

=== Singles ===
- "Quicksilver" (15 April 2002)
  - 10" vinyl, Zuma Records ZUMA001
  1. "Quicksilver" – 3:59
  2. "Dum Dum" – 7:15
- "I Wonder How" (24 June 2002) UK singles peak No. 58
  - CD, Zuma Records ZUMAD002
  1. "I Wonder How" – 4:44
  2. "Prove Love" – 4:47
  3. "I Got a Feeling" – 6:26
  - 10" vinyl, Zuma Records ZUMA002
  1. "I Wonder How" – 4:44
  2. "I Got a Feeling" – 6:26
- "Young Again" (9 September 2002) UK singles peak No. 52
  - CD1, Zuma Records ZUMAD003A
  1. "Young Again" – 5:12
  2. "Waterfalls" – 4:23
  3. "Headspin" – 5:30
  - CD2, Zuma Records ZUMAD003B
  1. "Young Again" – 5:12
  2. "Someone Else's Planet" – 4:44
  3. "Quicksilver" (US version – enhanced video)
  - 10" vinyl, Zuma Records ZUMA003
  1. "Young Again" – 5:12
  2. "Someone Else's Planet" – 4:44
