= Pepper's Ghost (Arena album) =

Studio album by Arena
- Released: 17 January 2005
- Recorded: June–October 2004
- Genre: Progressive rock
- Length: 52:11
- Label: Inside Out Music
- Producer: Clive Nolan

Arena chronology
Contagion (2003)	Pepper's Ghost (2005)	The Seventh Degree of Separation (2011)

Professional ratings
Review scores
Source	Rating
Classic Rock	4/5 stars

Pepper's Ghost is the sixth studio album by the English progressive rock band Arena. It was issued in 2005 by Inside Out Music.

The album tells the story of five heroes in 19th century London, who fight crime and, ultimately, defeat a demon. They are an exorcist, a ninja, a scientist who travels through time, a count and a cowboy with Indian ways. The story is told in the booklet that accompanies it, through a small comic.

== Tracks ==
All songs written by Clive Nolan, John Mitchell and Mick Pointer, except where noted. All lyrics written by Nolan.

1. "Bedlam Fayre" – 6:08
2. "Smoke and Mirrors" – 4:42
3. "The Shattered Room" – 9:48
4. "The Eyes of Lara Moon" – 4:30
5. "Tantalus" – 6:51
6. "Purgatory Road" – 7:25
7. "Opera Fanatica" (Nolan) – 13:06

== Personnel ==
- Clive Nolan – keyboards, backing vocals
- Mick Pointer – drums
- Rob Sowden – vocals
- John Mitchell – guitar, backing vocals
- Ian Salmon – bass, acoustic guitar
