= Psychedelicatessen (Threshold album) =

Studio album by Threshold
- Released: November 1994
- Recorded: 1994
- Genre: Progressive metal
- Length: 55:26
- Label: Giant Electric Pea; InsideOut Music
- Producer: Karl Groom; Richard West

Threshold chronology
Wounded Land (1993)	Psychedelicatessen (1994)	Extinct Instinct (1997)

Professional ratings
Review scores
Source	Rating
Imperiumi	6.5/10 stars
Metal.de	7/10
Powermetal.de	10/10
Stormbringer	4.5/5

Psychedelicatessen is the second studio album by Threshold, released in late 1994. It was their only studio album to feature Glynn Morgan on vocals until his return in 2017, and their only album with Nick Harradence playing drums. The band's members were displeased with the sound quality on the original release of the album, and had long desired to do a complete remix. Their first fan club release Decadent, released in 1999, contained remixes of three songs from the album. The entire Psychedelicatessen album was later remixed for a 2001 Special Edition release.

The name of the album is a portmanteau of the words "Psychedelic" and "Delicatessen".

== Track listing ==
1. "Sunseeker" (Karl Groom, Jon Jeary, Nick Midson, Richard West) – 7:38
2. "A Tension of Souls" (Groom, Jeary) – 7:10
3. "Into the Light" (Groom, Jeary) – 10:00
4. "Will to Give" (Glynn Morgan) – 4:54
5. "Under the Sun" (West) – 3:05
6. "Babylon Rising" (Groom, Jeary) – 4:42
7. "He Is I Am" (Groom, Jeary) – 5:51
8. "Innocent" (Morgan) – 4:43
9. "Devoted" (Groom, Jeary) – 7:32

=== Special edition ===
The 2001 remaster contains two bonus tracks:

1. "Lost" (Jeary) – 2:42 originally included on the Japanese release
2. "Intervention" (Groom, Jeary, Midson) – 8:25 The band's first released song, re-recorded with Glynn Morgan singing and Richard West on keyboards

=== Definitive Edition ===
The 2012 Definitive Edition released on nuclear blast includes the above bonus tracks, as well as the following:

1. "Fist of Tongues" (Morgan)
2. "Half Way Home" (West)

== Editions ==
A remastered and remixed special edition of the CD was released via InsideOut in 2001. This included the addition of two bonus tracks, the live album Livedelica as a bonus disc, and some extra features for the PC ("Enhanced Elements"). Livedelica features Jay Micciche on drums.

=== Special Edition "Enhanced Elements" Contents ===
1. Notes
2. "Innocent" (promotional video)
3. "A Tension of Souls" (live video)
4. Photos from the Livedelica tour
5. Psychedelicatessen screensaver
6. Hidden track ("He Is I Am" drum and bass version, from Decadent)

== Personnel ==
- Glynn Morgan – vocals
- Karl Groom – guitars
- Jon Jeary – bass, acoustic guitar, additional vocals
- Richard West - keyboard, piano
- Nick Midson – guitar
- Nick Harradence – drums
- Jay Micciche – drums (Livedelica)
