= Dead Reckoning (album) =

Studio album by Threshold
- Released: 28 March 2007
- Recorded: 2006
- Genre: Progressive metal
- Length: 54:55
- Label: Nuclear Blast

Threshold chronology
| Subsurface (2004) | Dead Reckoning (2007) | March of Progress (2012) |

Professional ratings
Review scores
| Source | Rating |
|---|---|
| Allmusic | 3/5 stars |
| DPRP | (very positive) |
| Imperiumi | 9/10 stars |

Dead Reckoning is the eighth studio album by progressive metal band Threshold. It is their first album since the departure of founding member Nick Midson and the last to feature long time vocalist Andrew "Mac" McDermott. It is also the only one to feature guest vocals (provided by Dan Swanö on two tracks) and their first album on their current label, Nuclear Blast. The song "Pilot in the Sky of Dreams" appeared on the 2008 film soundtrack In the Name of the King: A Dungeon Siege Tale.

Before settling on the final title, the album had the working title of Pilot in the Sky of Dreams.

Many of the songs on the album use extensive flight and aviation metaphors. Some of these are conveyed in the titles of the songs (e.g. "Slipstream", "Pilot in the Sky of Dreams", "Safe to Fly"). This theme is reinforced by the album's title, a reference to the early aviation practice of dead reckoning as a way of navigating through estimation of a current position based on a past position, a direction, and a speed.

== Track listing ==
All tracks are written by Richard West and Karl Groom, except where stated.

| No. | Title | Writer(s) | Length |
|---|---|---|---|
| 1. | "Slipstream" (feat. Dan Swanö) | | 4:55 |
| 2. | "This Is Your Life" | Richard West | 3:44 |
| 3. | "Elusive" (feat. Dan Swanö) | | 6:10 |
| 4. | "Hollow" | Richard West | 4:01 |
| 5. | "Pilot in the Sky of Dreams" | Richard West | 9:47 |
| 6. | "Fighting for Breath" | | 8:18 |
| 7. | "Disappear" | Richard West | 4:19 |
| 8. | "Safe to Fly" | | 5:08 |
| 9. | "One Degree Down" | | 8:33 |
| Total length: | | | 54:55 |

Bonus track

| No. | Title | Writer(s) | Length |
|---|---|---|---|
| 10. | "Supermassive Black Hole" (Muse cover) | Matt Bellamy | 3:08 |
| Total length: | | | 58:03 |

== Notes ==
- The limited edition digipack release, not available in the United States, contains a cover of Muse's "Supermassive Black Hole" as a bonus track.

== Members ==
- Andrew "Mac" McDermott – vocals
- Karl Groom – guitar
- Richard West – keyboard, piano, backing vocals
- Steve Anderson – bass guitar
- Johanne James – drums
- Dan Swanö – guest vocals on "Slipstream" and "Elusive"
- Peter Van't Riet – mastering
