= March of Progress (album) =

Studio album by Threshold
- Released: 24 August 2012 (Europe); 27 August 2012 (UK/EU); September 11, 2012 (US)
- Recorded: 2012
- Genres: Progressive metal, Doom metal
- Length: 75:34
- Label: Nuclear Blast

Threshold chronology
Dead Reckoning (2007)	March of Progress (2012)	For the Journey (2014)

Professional ratings
Review scores
Source	Rating
Allmusic	3.5/5 stars

March of Progress is the ninth studio album by progressive metal band Threshold. It is the first studio album on which original lead vocalist Damian Wilson sings since his return in 2007. It is also their second album on their current label, Nuclear Blast. The limited edition includes a bonus track, "Divinity".

== Track listing ==
No.	Title	Writer(s)	Length
1.	"Ashes"	Karl Groom, Richard West	6:51
2.	"Return of the Thought Police"	Groom, West	6:09
3.	"Staring at the Sun"	West	4:25
4.	"Liberty, Complacency, Dependency"	Groom, West	7:48
5.	"Colophon"	West	6:00
6.	"The Hours"	West, Steve Anderson	8:15
7.	"That's Why We Came"	Damian Wilson	5:40
8.	"Don't Look Down"	Groom, West	8:12
9.	"Coda"	Pete Morten	5:23
10.	"The Rubicon"	Groom, West	10:24
11.	"Divinity" (bonus track)	Morten	6:27
Total length:			75:34

== Notes ==
- Bonus track on limited edition US and digipack releases.

== Members ==
- Damian Wilson – lead vocals
- Karl Groom – guitar, backing vocals
- Richard West – keyboards
- Johanne James – drums
- Steve Anderson – bass guitar
- Pete Morten – guitar
