= Shadowland (band) =

British progressive rock band

- Origin: British
- Genres: Neo-prog, new prog
- Years active: 1992–present (hiatus: 1996–2009)
- Label: Verglas
- Members: Clive Nolan; Karl Groom; Nick Harradence; Mike Varty; Mark Westwood
- Past members: Ian Salmon
- Website: http://www.shadowlanduk.com/

Shadowland are a British progressive rock band formed in the 1990s. The band's music tends towards the pop side of progressive rock, while retaining its melodic and emotional intensity.

Shadowland took a lengthy break from recording and performing between 1996 and 2009. During this time Nolan was writing and performing in Arena, which has a heavier musical style. Nolan has also been Pendragon's regular keyboardist since 1986 and, more recently, has written and toured a rock opera entitled She in a partnership with Agnieszka Swita under the band name Caamora.

Late in 2008, Nolan announced that Shadowland would be reforming for a tour in early 2009. The tour promoted a best of album, A Matter of Perspective, featuring the band's favourite tracks from the three previous albums as well as some new material, which was released in 2009.

During the tour Shadowland filmed a DVD, Edge of Night, released by Metal Mind Productions. At the same time, Metal Mind also released an individually numbered box set, Cautionary Tales containing all the earlier albums with bonus tracks, the Edge of Night DVD, and a two disc concert recording called Live in Poland which comprises the audio from the DVD.

Mark Westwood (Caamora, Neo) has replaced Ian Salmon on bass in the 2009 incarnation, but the rest of the original 1990s line-up is unchanged.

== Members ==
Current members

- Clive Nolan - vocals and piano (1992–present)
- Karl Groom - guitars (1992–present)
- Nick Harradence - drums (1992–present)
- Mike Varty - keyboards (2009–present)

Former members

- Ian Salmon - bass and acoustic guitars (1992–1996)
- Mark Westwood – bass and acoustic guitars (2009–2026)

== Discography ==
=== Albums ===
- Ring of Roses (1992), reissued with two extra tracks (1997), remastered with bonus tracks (2009)
- Through the Looking Glass (1994), reissued with one extra track (1997), remastered with bonus tracks (2009)
- Mad as a Hatter (1996), remastered with bonus tracks (2009)
- A Matter of Perspective (2009)

=== DVDs ===
- Edge of Night (2009)

=== Box sets ===
- Cautionary Tales (2009)
