= Galahad (band) =

English progressive rock band

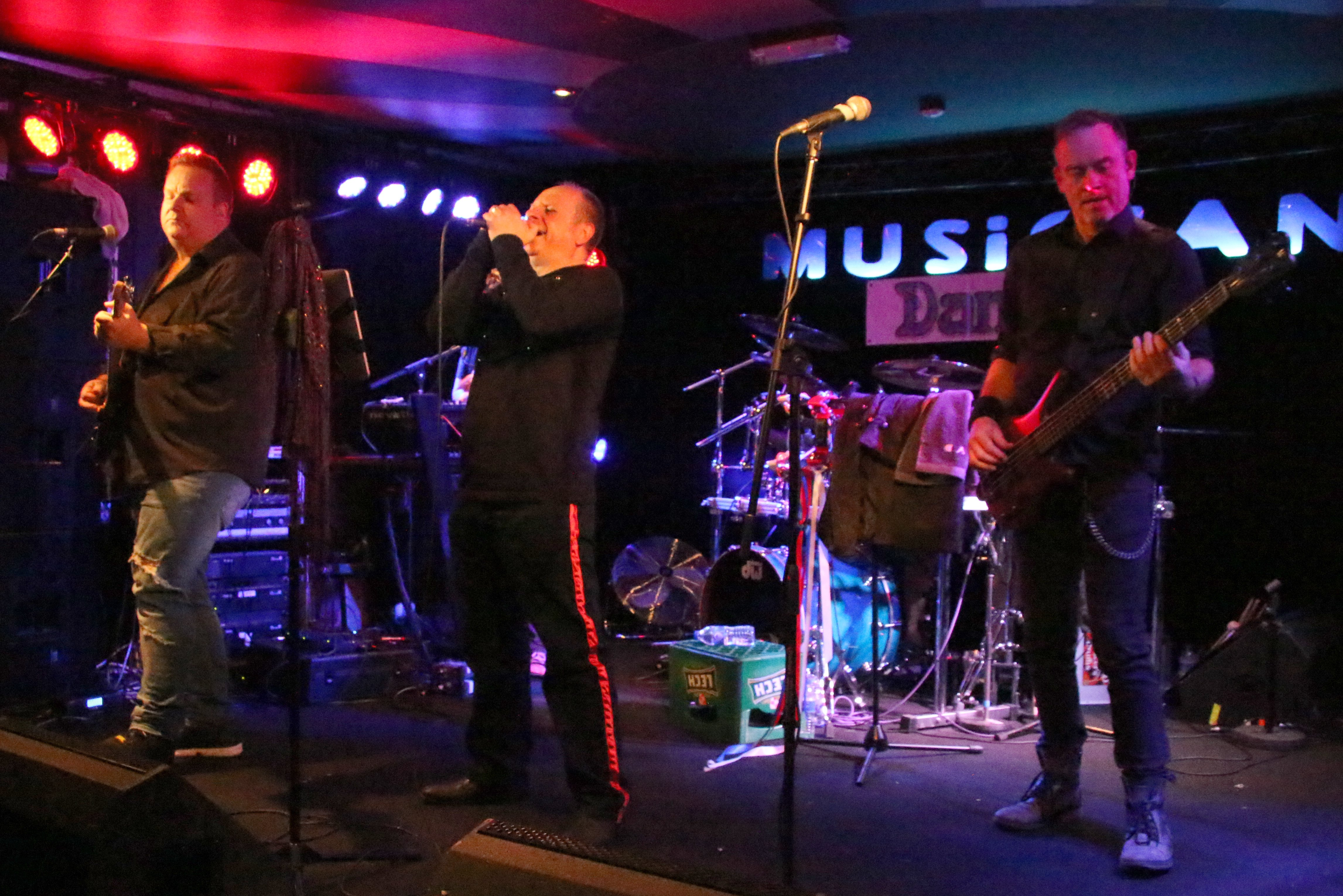
- Galahad performing live, December 2018

Background information
- Origin: England
- Genres: Neo-prog, progressive rock, prog metal
- Years active: 1985–present
- Labels: Avalon, Voiceprint/Gonzo Multimedia, Oskar Productions/Independent Music Market, Blue Stone, PRM, Pony Canyon International
- Members: Stuart Nicholson; Spencer Luckman; Dean Baker; Mark Spencer; Lee Abraham
- Past members: Mark Andrews; Tim Ashton; Karl Garrett; Mike Hewetson; Nick Hodgson; Mike Hooker; Roy Keyworth; Mike Kneller; Pat McCann; John O'Callaghan; Paddy O'Callaghan; Steve Pearson; Neil Pepper; Peter Wallbridge; Paul Watts; Craig Wilson
- Website: galahadonline.com

Galahad is an English progressive rock band formed in 1985 in Bournemouth. They should not be confused with the German medieval folk rock band of the same name. They have released 12 studio albums, six live albums and three rarities collections, as well as two offshoot project albums under the names Galahad Acoustic Quintet and the Galahad Electric Company. Over the past 40 years they have played with the likes of Pendragon, IQ and Twelfth Night. Galahad have performed their own shows and at festivals in Europe and North America, and have sold tens of thousands of albums despite never having had a major record deal.

== History ==
The band's vocalist Stuart Nicholson described Galahad's early days as follows: "...the band was formed just after the so called second wave of 'Prog' bands such as Marillion, Pallas, IQ, Twelfth Night, Pendragon etc. of Prog bands came to the fore in the early Eighties. They all started around 1978–1981 and we started in 1985 after the bubble had effectively burst, but didn't really get going seriously until 1990 onwards. To be honest we really did play just for fun in the early days and weren't really that concerned about record deals etc. It was only after playing with some of the bigger bands when we thought. Actually, we are just as good as these guys so why not give it a go..."

In 2012, Galahad released their first ever vinyl LP 'Battle Scars' in conjunction with Ritual Echo Records, on high quality 180-gram vinyl, in a gatefold sleeve, as a limited edition pressing of 300. Since then the band has released several more albums on vinyl i.e. 'Beyond the Realms of Euphoria' (a double LP/EP album available on red/orange vinyl), 'Empires never Last' (double LP including an 'orchestral' version of the title track, available on blue or black vinyl), 'Seas of Change' (Standard single LP on black or turquoise blue vinyl and also on limited edition picture disc in a die cut sleeve) and in 2020 'Sleepers' on a double gatefold LP (available on standard black or white vinyl). All releases are on their own 'Avalon Records' imprint other than some re-issues which are released in association with Polish label 'Oskar Productions'.

Founder member Roy Keyworth left the band in March 2017. Producer Karl Groom filled in for Keyworth on the band's Quiet Storms album released in May 2017, but did not join the band full-time.

Lee Abraham was officially announced as the new Galahad guitarist on 23 October 2017 after having already recorded all the guitar parts for their 2018 Seas of Change album, which was released in January 2018.

In 2020 Galahad released a 21st anniversary edition of 'Following Ghosts'. The expansive release brings together all of the 'Following Ghosts' related material and consists of a three-CD package: a newly mixed version of 'Following Ghosts' taken from original tapes, 'Alternative Ghosts' featuring alternate versions of original album tracks, and the experimental 'De-Constructing Ghosts' which had accompanied the main album.

2020 also saw the re-release of 'Sleepers' on vinyl for the first time, 25 years after the original CD release, in conjunction with Oskar Records in Poland and including several extra tracks. The album was released as a double gatefold 2X LP on standard black or white vinyl.

October 2020 saw the release of the first 'Galahad Electric Company' album in 21 years, which was effectively a 'Covid lockdown' album written and recorded by Dean and Stu at their respective homes. Entitled 'When the Battle Is Over', it is one of the fastest Galahad-related albums to have been written, recorded and released, as writing only started in late April 2020. A second GEC album, 'Soul Therapy', was released on 20 October 2021.

Galahad's eleventh studio album 'The Last Great Adventurer' features the band's longest-lasting line-up and was released on 24 October 2022. Another new studio album 'The Long Goodbye' was released in October 2023 on CD and November 2023 on LP and digital platforms.

== Members ==
=== Current members ===
- Stuart Nicholson – vocals (1985–present)
- Spencer Luckman – drums (1987–present)
- Dean Baker – keyboards (1997–present)
- Lee Abraham – guitar (2017–present), bass (2005–2009)
- Mark Spencer – bass (2012–2014, 2018–present), guitar (2012–2014)

Occasional member on recordings only: Sarah Bolter – Flute, clarinet, alto and tenor sax, vocals (1994–present)

=== Former members ===
- Roy Keyworth – guitar (1985–1998, 1999–2017)
- Paul Watts – bass (1985–1989)
- Mike Hooker – keyboards (1985–1987)
- Nick Hodgson – keyboards (1985–1987)
- Paddy O'Callaghan – drums (1985–1987)
- John O'Callaghan – rhythm guitar (1985)
- Steve Pearson – drums (1987)
- Mike Hewetson – keyboards (1987–1988)
- Mark Andrews – keyboards (1988–1991)
- Pat McCann – bass (1989)
- Tim Ashton – bass (1989–1992, 2014–2017)
- Karl Garrett – keyboards (1991–1997)
- Neil Pepper – bass (1992–2002, 2009–2011; his death)
- Craig Wilson – guitar (1998–1999)
- Peter Wallbridge – bass (2002–2004)
- Mike Kneller – bass (2004–2005)

== Discography ==
=== Tapes ===
- Studio 95 Demo, Autumn 1995
- One Knight at Mr Cs, August 1987
- In a Moment of Madness, May 1989
- Otherworldly Pleasures (Promo), January 1991
- Other Crimes and Misdemeanours, January 1992
- Suffering in Silence (Promo Only), February 1992
- Galahad's Christmas Lecture, Spring 1993
- In a Moment of Complete Madness (Polish Version), April 1993
- Nothing Is Written (Polish Version), April 1993
- Other Crimes & Misdemeanours II, August 1995
- Not All There (Polish Version), September 1995
- Sleepers (Polish Version), September 1995
- Classic Rock Live (Polish Version), July 1996
- Following Ghosts (Polish Version), Autumn 1998

=== LPs ===
- Battle Scars – Single Gatefold LP, April 2012
- Beyond the Realms of Euphoria – Double Gatefold LP/EP, October 2012
- Empires Never Last – Double Gatefold LP, October 2016
- Seas of Change – standard single LP on black or turquoise vinyl and picture disc , January 2018
- Sleepers – Double Gatefold LP on black or white vinyl, Spring 2020
- Following Ghosts (Original album re-mixed) – Double Gatefold LP on black, gold or orange/red vinyl, Autumn 2021
- The Last Great Adventurer – Single LP in a Gatefold sleeve on black, red/black/white splatter, green/black marble, Spring 2023
- The Long Goodbye – Single LP in a Gatefold sleeve on black, black/white splatter, purple/black splatter, November 2023

=== Singles ===
- Dreaming From the Inside/The Opiate, July 1987
- Rollercoaster (single sided flexi single), February 1992
- Victory (Download only), June 2020

=== Studio CDs ===
- Nothing Is Written, June 1991 (Japan version April 1992, remastered 2007)
- In a Moment of Complete Madness, April 1993, remastered 2008)
- Sleepers, September 1995 (Japan version April 1995, 20th anniversary, remastered October 2015)
- Following Ghosts, June 1998 (remastered reissue 2007; expanded edition September 2020)
- Year Zero, September 2002 (10th anniversary expanded and remastered edition September 2012)
- Empires Never Last, Spring 2007 (deluxe edition, remastered January 2015)
- Battle Scars, April 2012
- Beyond the Realms of Euphoria, October 2012
- Empires: A Curious Companion, (Issued free with Empires Never Last deluxe edition) January 2015
- Quiet Storms, May 2017
- Seas of Change, January 2018
- The Last Great Adventurer, October 2022
- The Long Goodbye, October/November 2023

=== Live CDs ===
- Classic Rock Live, April 1996, Japanese version September 1996
- Resonance – Live in Poland, 2006
- Two Classic Rock Lives, 2008
- Sleepless in Phoenixville – Live at Rosfest, October 2009
- Whitchurch Live 92/93 – Live Archives Vol. 2, February 2012
- Solidarity – Live in Konin, September 2015
- Alive at Loreley, September 2025

=== EPs ===
- Voiceprint Radio Sessions EP, January 1994
- Seize the Day, February 2014
- Guardian Angel, June 2014
- Mein Herz brennt, October 2014 (single)
- 30, July 2015

=== Compilation CDs ===
- Decade (Germany only), March 1997
- Other Crimes and Misdemeanours II, May 1997
- Other Crimes and Misdemeanours III, September 2001
- Other Crimes and Misdemeanours, 2008
- Other Crimes & Misdemeanours II & III, 2009
- When Worlds Collide, Winter 2015

=== Downloads/Streams ===
- Empires Never Last, Spring 2007
- Galahad's Christmas Lecture, Spring 2012
- Battle Scars, April 2012
- Beyond the Realms of Euphoria, October 2012
- Seize the Day EP, February 2014
- Guardian Angel EP, Summer 2014
- Mein Herz brennt EP, Autumn 2014
- Empires Never Last – The Deluxe edition, January 2015
- Empires: A Curious Companion, January 2015
- Seas of Change, January 2018
- Sleepless in Phoenixville – RoSfest Live 2007, February 2020
- Classic Rock Live, March 2020
- Following Ghosts – Expanded Edition, September 2020
- Resonance – Live in Poland 2006, December 2020
- The Last Great Adventurer, October 2022
- Solidarity – Live in Konin, December 2022
- Studio 95 (very early demos), June 2023
- The Long Goodbye, November 2023

=== Spin-off projects ===
- Not All There CD (Galahad Acoustic Quintet) January 1995
- De-Constructing Ghosts CD (Galahad Electric Company) August 1999 (Re-mix album)
- When The Battle Is Over CD/Download/stream (Galahad Electric Company) October 2020
- Soul Therapy CD/Download/stream (Galahad Electric Company) 20 October 2021

=== DVDs ===
- Resonance – Live in Poland, 2006
- Whitchurch 92/93 – Live Archives Vol. 2, February 2012 (Digipack)
- Solidarity – Live in Konin, September 2015 (Digipack)

=== Other recordings ===
- The Ceiling Speaks – for Geoff Mann tribute album 'Mannerisms', 1994
- The Chamber of 32 Doors – for Genesis tribute album 'The River of Constant Change', 1996
- Lady Fantasy – for Camel tribute album 'Harbour of Joy', 1996
- Fact and Fiction – for Twelfth Night re-issue of 'Fact and Fiction – The Definitive Edition', 2018
