= Threshold (band) =

English progressive metal band

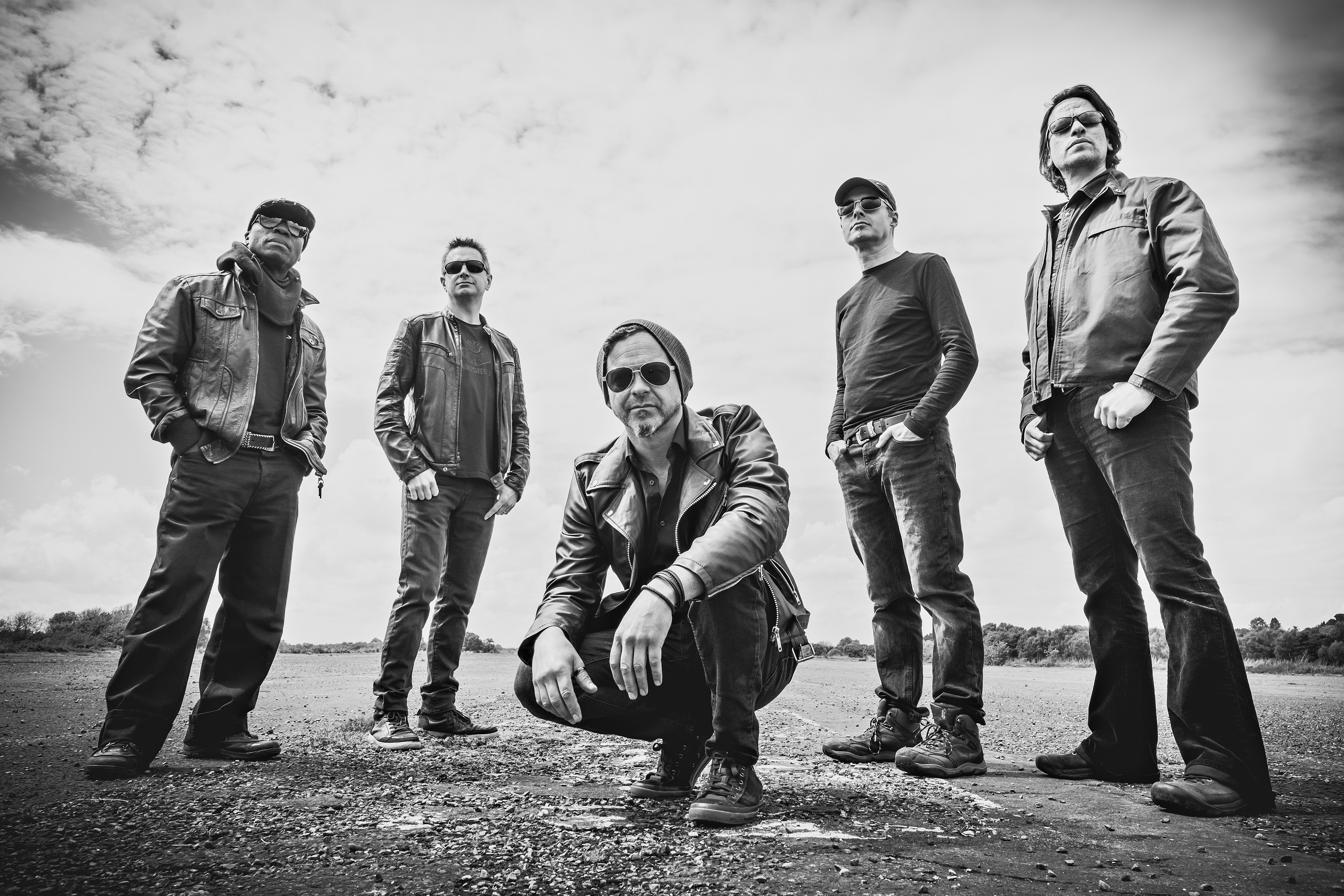
- Threshold in 2017. L-R: Johanne James, Richard West, Glynn Morgan, Karl Groom, Steve Anderson.

Background information
- Origin: Surrey, England
- Genre: Progressive metal
- Years active: 1988–present
- Labels: Giant Electric Pea; Nuclear Blast; Inside Out Music
- Members: Karl Groom; Richard West; Glynn Morgan; Johanne James; Steve Anderson
- Past members: Nick Midson; Jon Jeary; Tony Grinham; Pete Crawford; Damian Wilson; Ian Bennett; Nick Harradence; Jay Micciche; Mark Heaney; Andrew "Mac" McDermott; Pete Morten
- Website: thresh.net

Threshold are an English progressive metal band formed in Surrey in the late 1980s. The guitarist and producer Karl Groom has been the band's only consistent member.

== History ==
=== 1988–1992 ===
Threshold began their career in 1988, initially playing covers of metal groups like Ratt and Testament. As they continued playing together, they began to write their own songs, and eventually stopped playing covers altogether. Early recordings were released locally on cassette under the band name "If Not, Why?". They played their first gig at The Compasses in Egham, Surrey, with Jon Jeary on vocals and Ian Bennett on bass. In 1992, they signed their first record deal, and after adding vocalist Damian Wilson to the group alongside guitarists Karl Groom and Nick Midson, bassist Jon Jeary and drummer Tony Grinham, produced their first commercial recording, "Intervention," which was released on a Dutch progressive rock compilation album. Shortly afterwards, keyboardist Richard West joined the band, and he remains with them to this day.

=== 1993–1999 ===
The band's debut album, Wounded Land, was released in 1993, taking its name and some thematic elements from Stephen R. Donaldson's novel of the same name. Wilson was unavailable to join the band for the follow-up tour, and so Glynn Morgan was recruited to replace him. He sang on the band's 1994 second recording, Psychedelicatessen, which spawned a music video for the song "Innocent," the band's first. The following year, Morgan and the band toured Europe and recorded some of their performances for the short live album, Livedelica.

Threshold took a break before their next effort, during which time Morgan and then-drummer Jay Micciche left to form Mindfeed. Rather than finding an unknown singer to replace him, the band turned again to Damian Wilson, and together they recorded 1997's Extinct Instinct. They followed this with another tour of Europe, this time supported by Enchant. Additionally, Johanne James, the band's current drummer, played with them for the first time during this tour. Wilson was unavailable for their next album, so former Sargant Fury vocalist Andrew "Mac" McDermott, joined to record Clone and would remain with them until 2007.

=== 2000–2005 ===
In 2001, Threshold released Hypothetical, which saw Johanne James firmly cemented as the band's permanent drummer. Another lineup change occurred in 2003, when bassist Jon Jeary left and was replaced by Steve Anderson. Around this time the band also re-released their first three studio albums in Special Editions, with bonus tracks, a remastered sound, expanded liner notes and, in the case of Wounded Land and Psychedelicatessen, special CD-ROM content. Their newer albums, starting with Hypothetical, were released in Limited Editions, with similar bonus content. The albums Critical Mass (2002) and Subsurface (2004) followed, interspersed by the double live album and DVD Critical Energy.

=== 2006–2011 ===
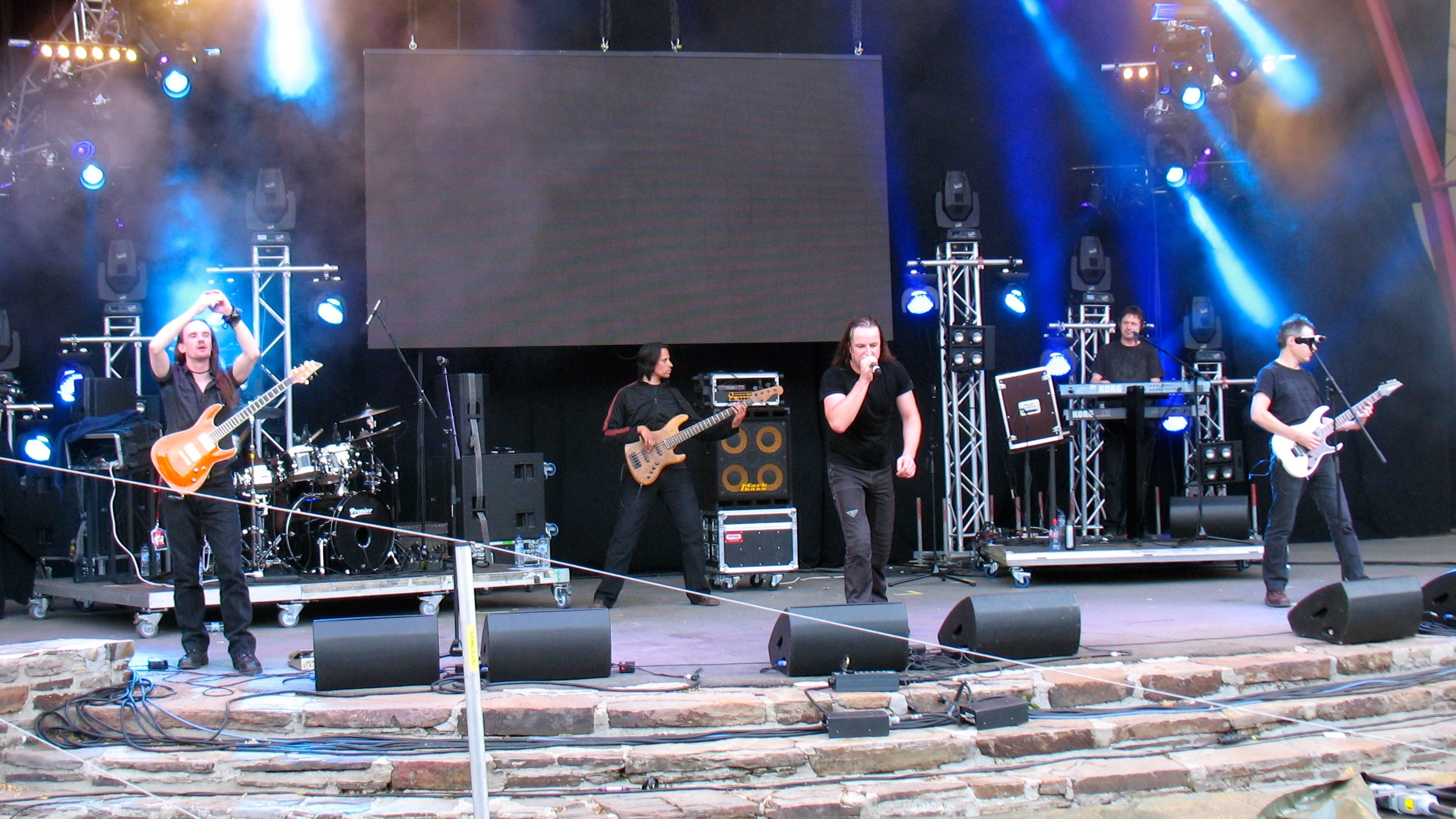
The band performing at Lorelei in 2011

Threshold left their longtime label, InsideOut Music, in 2006 to join Nuclear Blast Records. Guitarist Nick Midson left the band in early 2007 for unknown reasons. The band released Dead Reckoning which spawned a music video for an edit of the song "Pilot in the Sky of Dreams". The song also appeared on the 2008 movie soundtrack In the Name of the King: A Dungeon Siege Tale. This marks the first occasion of a song by the band appearing in a motion picture. In July 2007 vocalist Mac left the band and original singer Damian Wilson returned as Threshold's frontman for the first time in nearly a decade for the band's tour dates which extended into 2009. Pete Morten replaced Midson as guitarist for the tour and later albums. InsideOut Music released the first official Threshold compilation in November 2007. The album The Ravages of Time is a two-disc set covering all of the band's official albums from Wounded Land to Dead Reckoning. In 2009 the band released a limited edition eight-disc singles box set, including previously unreleased b-sides and brand new re-recordings of old demo songs released in other forms before, including Smile at the Moon, (which was debuted live on the 2009 Essence of Progression Tour), Shifting Sands, Half Way Home and Fist of Tongues. On 3 August 2011, former vocalist Andrew McDermott died of kidney failure.

=== 2012–2017 ===
On 24 August 2012, Nuclear Blast announced the release of March of Progress. It was the first album to feature Damian Wilson on vocals since 1997. The album was followed on 19 September 2014 by the band's tenth studio album For the Journey. The following year the band released the double live album "European Journey" recorded during their November 2014 tour. In February 2017, Pete Morten left Threshold to focus on his own projects, and the following month Threshold announced that they had parted ways with Damian Wilson.

=== 2017–present ===
Glynn Morgan, the band's former vocalist from 1994 to 1996 replaced Damian Wilson for the album Legends of the Shires released in September 2017. The album entered the top 20 of the national album charts in Germany and Switzerland and spawned a music video for the song "Small Dark Lines". The following year the band released the live album "Two-Zero-One-Seven" recorded during their 2017 European tour. In July 2021 Threshold announced that they were back in the studio recording their twelfth studio album, teasing that "if Legends of the Shires had a slightly darker, moodier older brother then this would be it". In July 2022, the band announced their 12th album would be titled Dividing Lines, and it was released on 18 November 2022, entering the top 20 of the national album charts in Switzerland and the top 40 in Germany. The album had started life as sequel to Legends of the Shires, but following a decision not to continue with the story, keyboard player Richard West recorded his own sequel The Fall of the Shires under the Oblivion Protocol moniker. At the same time West's autobiography Maybe A Writer - My Life In Threshold was published by Kingmaker Publishing.

In 2024 Threshold released newly remixed versions of their first four albums Wounded Land, Psychedelicatessen, Extinct Instinct and Clone on CD and vinyl formats. The band promoted the remixes with the retrospective Threshold Through Time Tour where they performed songs from all twelve of the studio albums. For these shows Alessio Garavello stood in for vocalist Glynn Morgan who was suffering from a throat condition.

== Personnel ==
Threshold at Luppolo in Rock, 22 July 2023

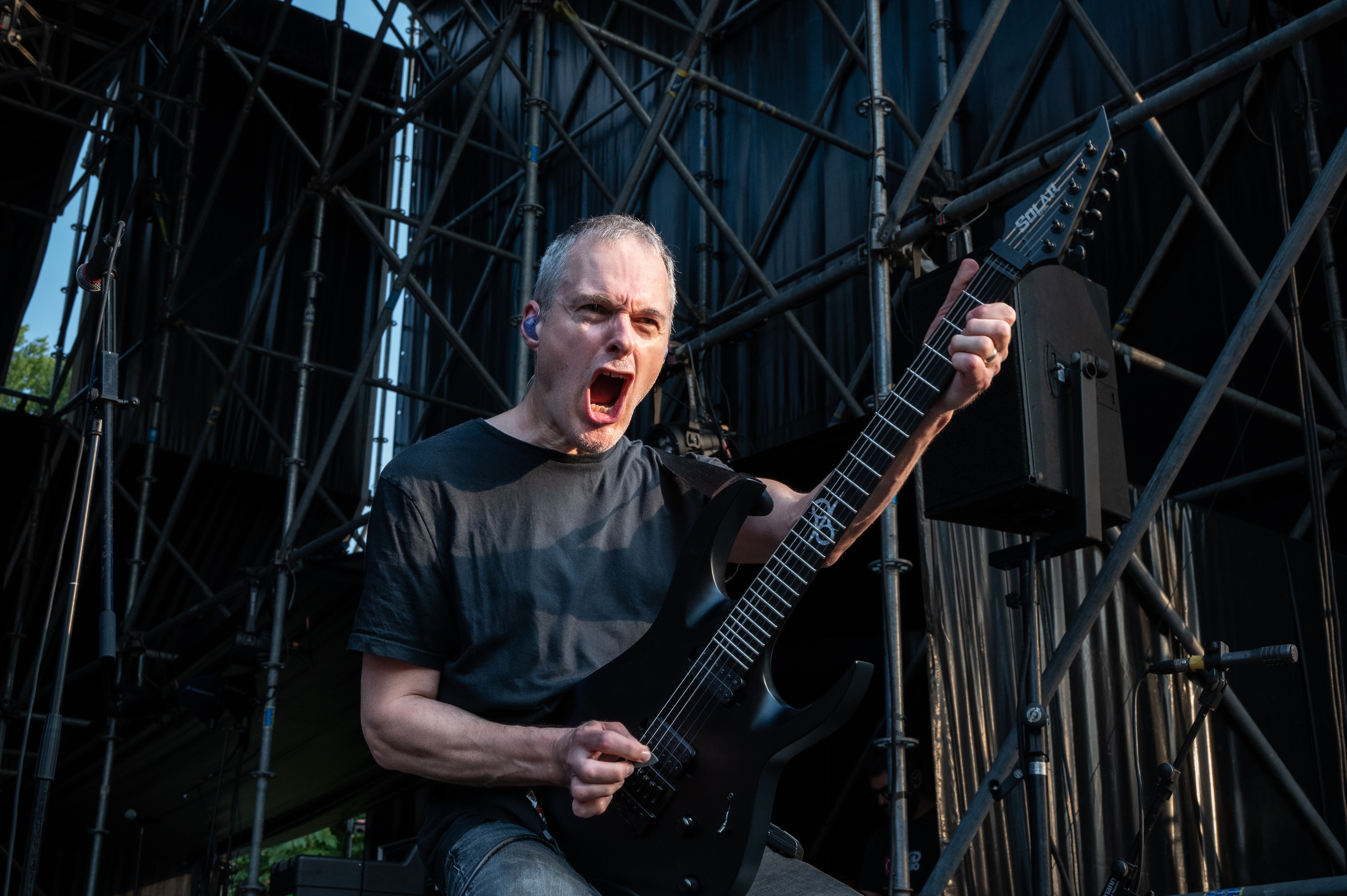
Groom

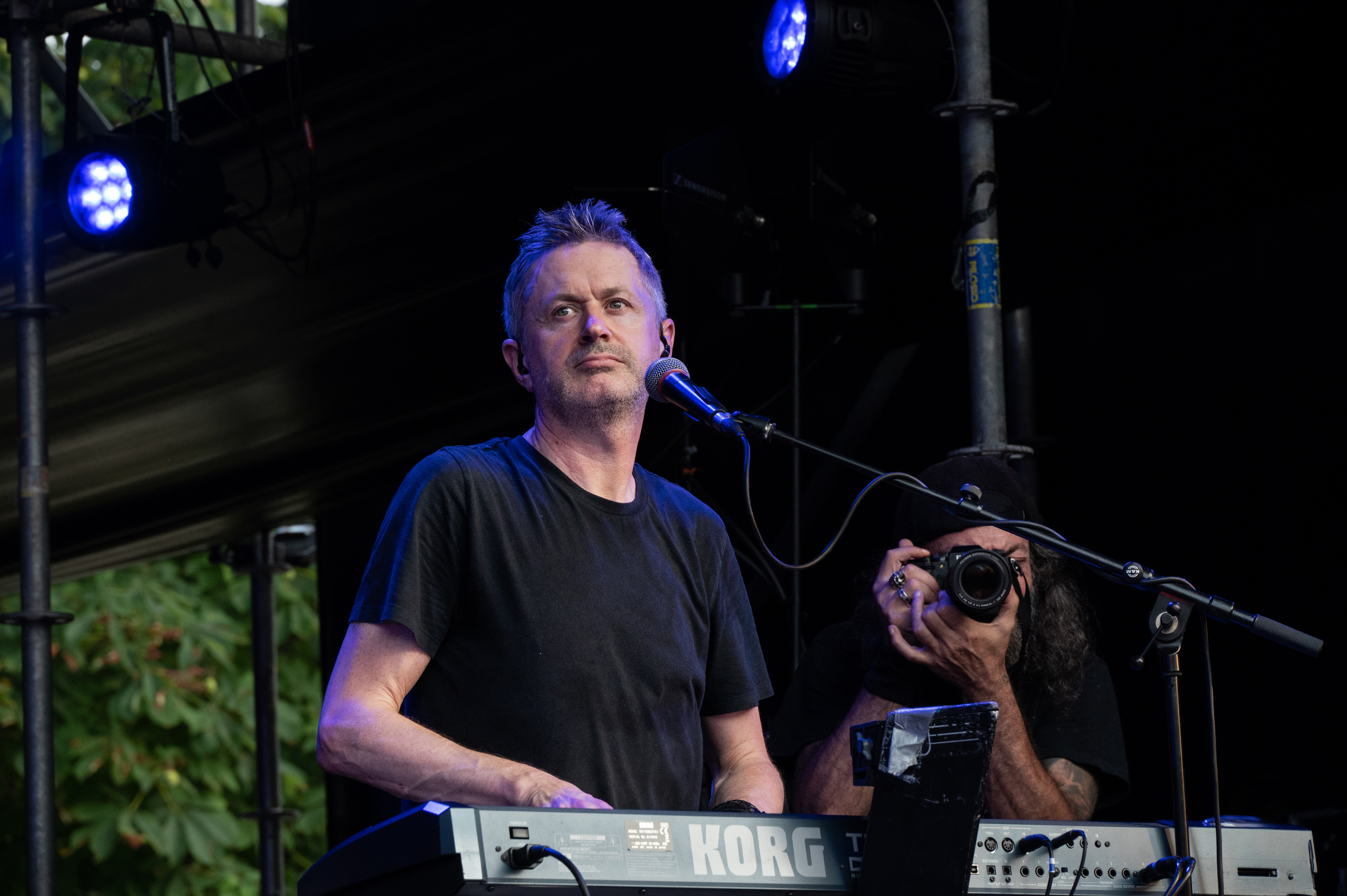
West

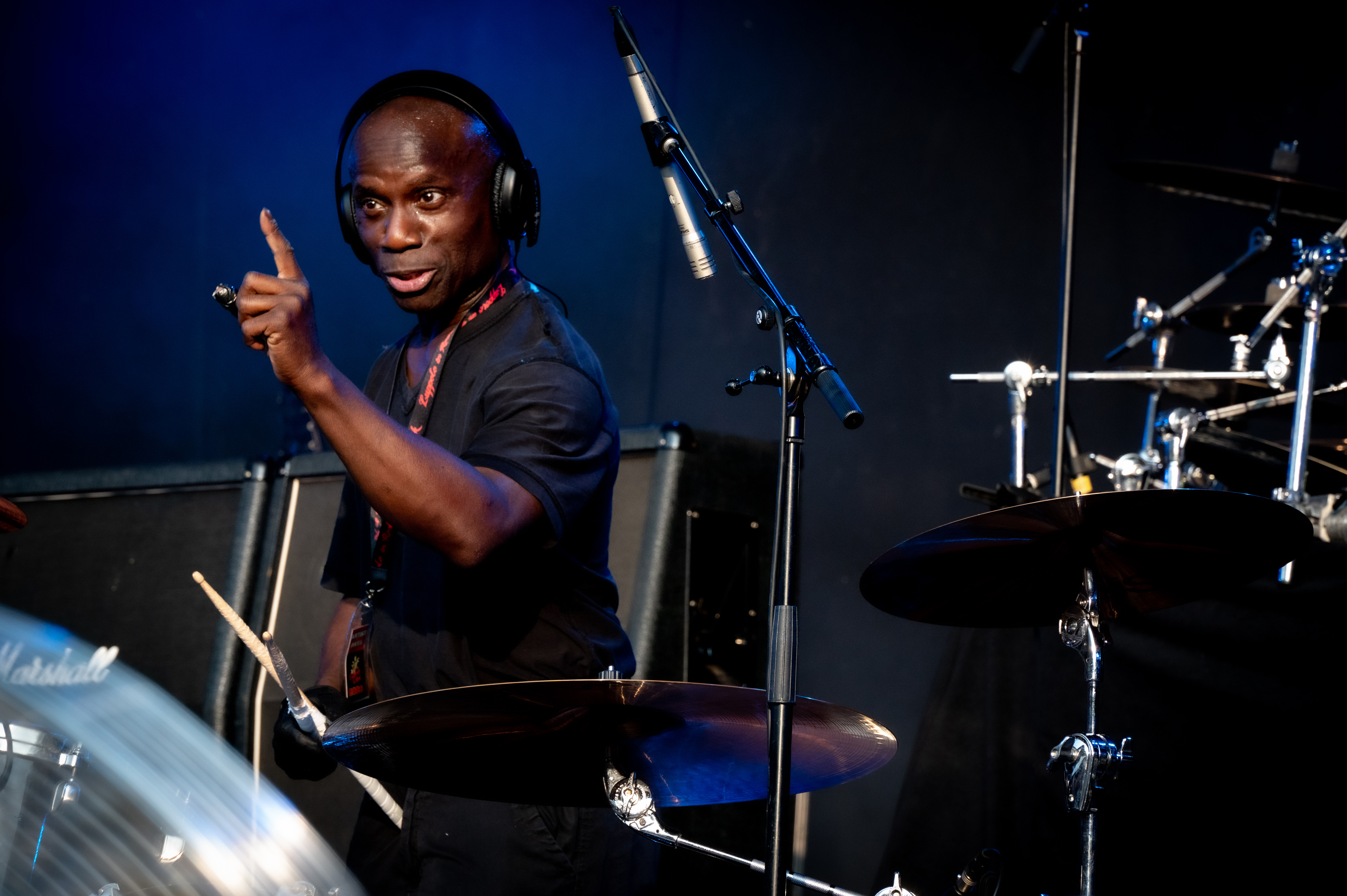
James

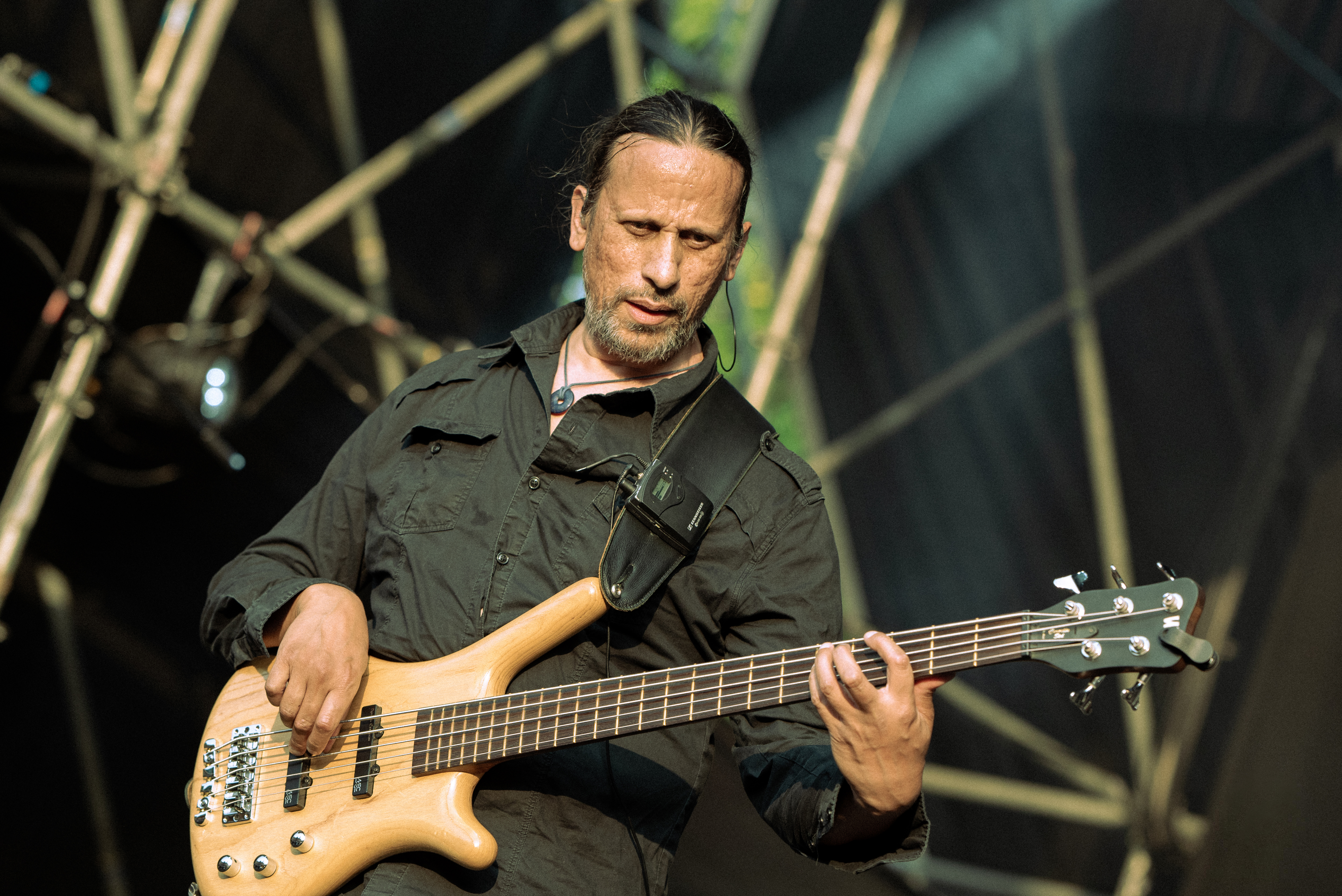
Anderson

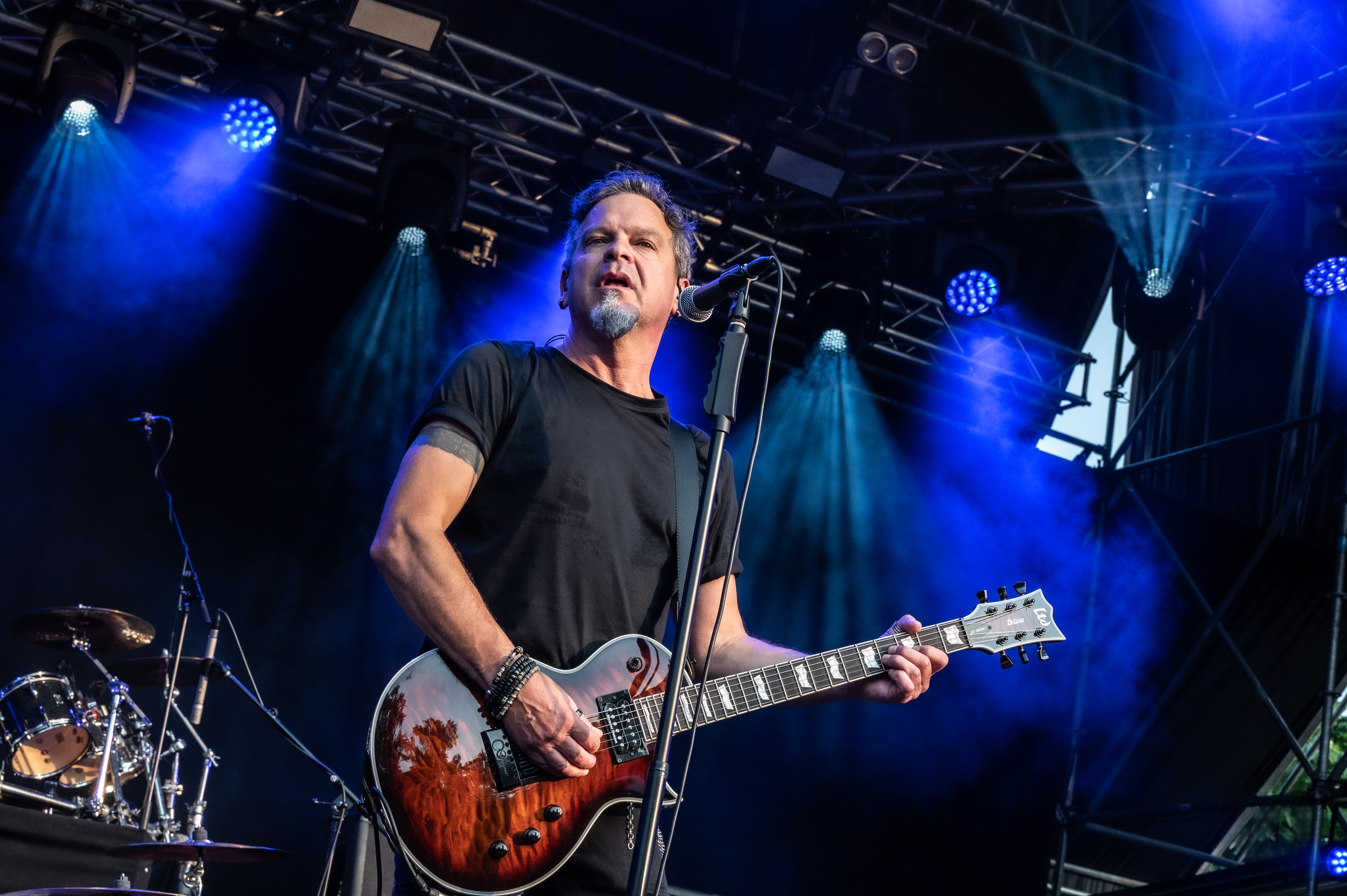
Morgan

Current members

- Karl Groom – lead guitar, backing vocals (1988–present), keyboards (1988–1992)
- Richard West – keyboards, backing vocals (1992–present)
- Glynn Morgan – lead vocals (1993–1996, 2017–present), rhythm guitar (2017–present)
- Johanne James – drums (2000–present; touring 1997)
- Steve Anderson – bass, backing vocals (2003–present)

Former members

- Nick Midson – rhythm guitar (1988–2006)
- Jon Jeary – lead vocals (1988–1992; studio guest 2017), bass (1990–2003), backing vocals, acoustic guitar (1992–2003)
- Tony Grinham – drums (1988–1993)
- Ian Bennett – bass (1988–1989)
- Pete Crawford – bass (1989–1990)
- Damian Wilson – lead vocals (1992–1993, 1996–1998, 2007–2017)
- Nick Harradence – drums (1993–1994)
- Jay Micciche – drums (1994–1996)
- Mark Heaney – drums (1996–2000)
- Andrew "Mac" McDermott – lead vocals (1998–2007; died 2011)
- Pete Morten – rhythm guitar, backing vocals (2007–2017)

== Discography ==
=== Studio albums ===
Album details	Peak positions									
Album details	UK	UK (Rock)	SCO	AUT	FIN	FRA	GER	NLD	SWE	SWI
Wounded Land: Released: 2 August 1993; Label: GEP	—	—	—	—	—	—	—	—	—	—
Psychedelicatessen: Released: November 1994; Label: GEP	—	—	—	—	—	—	—	—	—	—
Extinct Instinct: Released: 10 March 1997; Label: GEP	—	—	—	—	—	—	—	—	—	—
Clone: Released: 20 November 1998; Label: GEP	—	—	—	—	—	—	—	—	—	—
Hypothetical: Released: 20 March 2001; Label: Inside Out Music	—	—	—	—	—	—	—	—	—	—
Critical Mass: Released: 2 September 2002; Label: Inside Out Music	—	—	—	—	—	—	78	—	—	—
Subsurface: Released: 3 August 2004; Label: Inside Out Music	—	—	—	—	—	—	66	—	—	—
Dead Reckoning: Released: 28 March 2007; Label: Nuclear Blast	—	37	—	—	—	—	64	95	—	—
March of Progress: Released: 24 August 2012; Label: Nuclear Blast	—	23	—	55	—	102	28	70	43	30
For the Journey: Released: 19 September 2014; Label: Nuclear Blast	116	3	—	71	33	118	33	74	—	19
Legends of the Shires: Released: 8 September 2017; Label: Nuclear Blast	90	5	56	31	—	163	13	—	—	14
Dividing Lines: Release date: 18 November 2022; Label: Nuclear Blast	—	9	76	67	—	—	34	—	—	14
"—" denotes releases that did not chart.

=== Compilations ===
- The Ravages of Time – The Best of Threshold (2007)

=== Live albums ===
- Livedelica (1995) – also included in Special Edition of Psychedelicatessen
- Concert in Paris (2002)
- Critical Energy (2004, 2CDs) – also included in Special Edition containing both 2CD and DVD versions
- Surface to Stage (2006) – also reissued as a 2CD Expanded Edition with extra tracks in 2021.
- European Journey (2015)
- Two-Zero-One-Seven (2018)
- Concert In London (2024)

=== DVD ===
- Critical Energy (2004)

=== Singles ===
- "Paradox"
- "Sunseeker"
- "Innocent"
- "Virtual Isolation"
- "Freaks"
- "Light and Space"
- "Phenomenon"
- "Mission Profile"
- "Pressure"
- "Pilot in the Sky of Dreams"
- "Supermassive Black Hole"
- "Watchtower on the Moon" (2014)
- "Turned to Dust" (2014)
- "Unforgiven" (2014)
- "Lost in Translation" (2017)
- "Small Dark Lines" (2017)
- "Stars and Satellites" (2017)
- "Silenced" (2022)
- "King Of Nothing" (2022)
- "Complex" (2022)
- "Haunted" (2022)

=== Music videos ===
- Innocent (1994)
- Fragmentation (acoustic version) (2003)
- Pressure (2004)
- Pilot in the Sky of Dreams (2007)
- Staring at the Sun (2013)
- Unforgiven (2014)
- Small Dark Lines (2017)
- Silenced (2022)

=== Remixes and rarities album ===
- Decadent (1999) – remixes and radio edits
- Wireless: Acoustic Sessions (2003) – acoustic recordings
- Replica (2004) – alternative versions and previously unreleased songs
- Paradox: The Singles Collection (2009) – eight CD singles box set
