= Arena (band) =

British progressive rock band

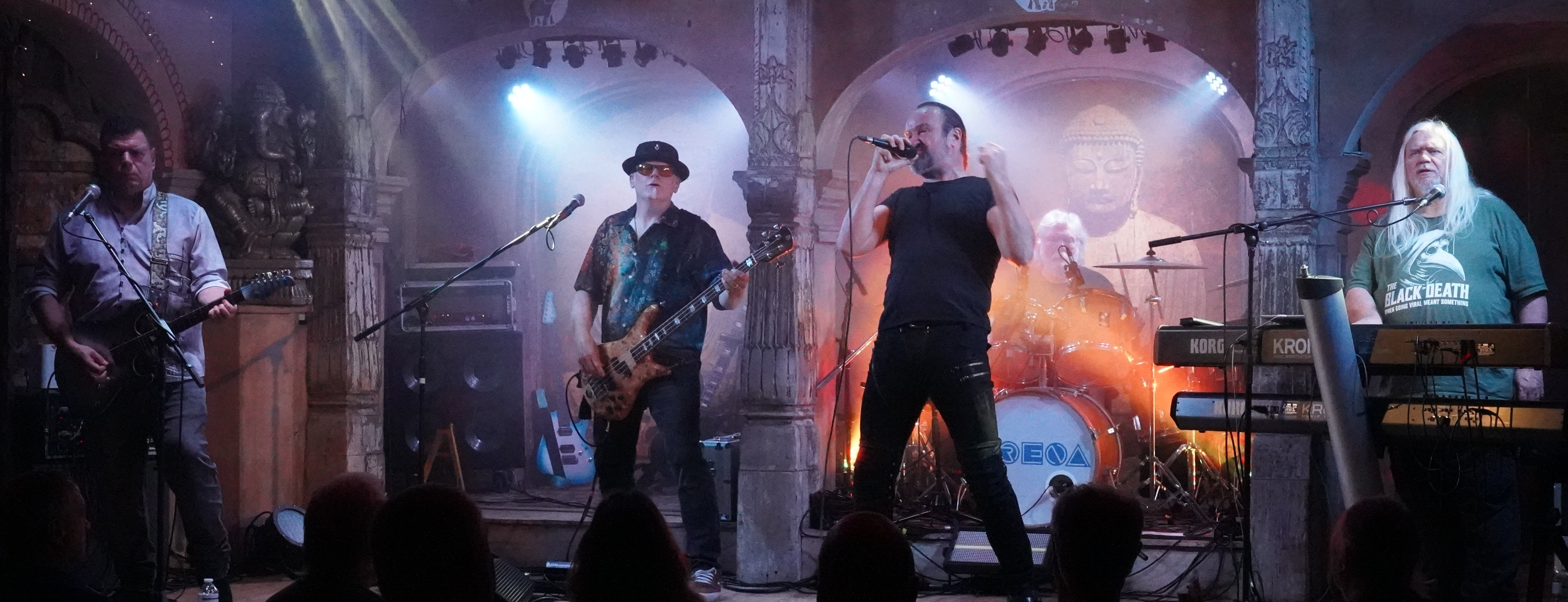
- Arena live at Trading Boundaries, 2nd May 2025. L-R: John Mitchell, Kylan Amos, Damian Wilson, Mick Pointer, and Clive Nolan.

Background information
- Origin: Virginia Water, Surrey, England
- Genre: Neo-prog
- Years active: 1995–present
- Labels: Verglas, Griffin, SPV
- Members: Clive Nolan; Mick Pointer; John Mitchell; Kylan Amos; Paul Manzi
- Past members: Keith More; John Carson; Cliff Orsi; John Jowitt; Paul Wrightson; Ian Salmon; Rob Sowden; Damian Wilson
- Website: arenaband.co.uk

Arena are an English neo-prog band founded in 1995. Their style ranges from symphonic to hard rock.

== History ==
Arena was founded in 1995 by Clive Nolan keyboardist of Pendragon and Shadowland, and Mick Pointer, the original drummer of Marillion, whose tenure lasting from 1979 until 1983. The other founding members of the band were guitarist Keith More, vocalist John Carson, and bassist Cliff Orsi. Orsi was replaced by John Jowitt (of IQ) in the band's inaugural year, whilst Carson and More left the band in 1996 and 1997, and were replaced by Paul Wrightson and John Mitchell (of Frost*) respectively.

Both Jowitt and Wrightson left the band in 1998, to be replaced by Ian Salmon and Rob Sowden, creating the band's most stable line-up to date (from 1998 until 2010). This line-up came to an end with Paul Manzi replacing Sowden in 2010. In 2011, Jowitt rejoined the band to replace the departing Salmon, leaving again in 2014 and being replaced by Kylan Amos. In July 2020, Manzi was replaced by Damian Wilson. At the end of 2026, Wilson will in turn be succeeded by Manzi.

Most of the band's lyrics are written by Nolan, though Pointer contributed lyrics to Sirens and other tracks on the first two albums.

Musically the band's style ranges from symphonic to hard rock. While in the beginning the band sounded like Fish-era Marillion, some of their recent albums have a similar sound to Nolan's earlier band, Shadowland.

AllMusic called them one of the dominant neo-prog groups of the 1990s.

== Personnel ==
==== Current members ====
- Clive Nolan – keyboards, backing vocals (1995–present)
- Mick Pointer – drums (1995–present)
- John Mitchell – guitars, backing vocals (1997–present)
- Kylan Amos – bass, backing vocals (2014–present)
- Paul Manzi – lead vocals (2010–2020, 2027–present)

==== Former members ====
- John Carson – lead vocals (1995–1996)
- Cliff Orsi – bass (1995–1996)
- Keith More – guitars, backing vocals (1995–1997)
- John Jowitt – bass, backing vocals (1996–1999, 2010–2014)
- Paul Wrightson – lead vocals (1996–1999)
- Ian Salmon – bass, acoustic guitar (1999–2010)
- Rob Sowden – lead vocals (1999–2010)
- Damian Wilson – lead vocals (2020–2026)

=== Lineups ===
1995–1996	1996–1997	1997–1999	1999–2010	2010–2014
John Carson – lead vocals; Keith More – guitars, backing vocals; Clive Nolan – keyboards, backing vocals; Mick Pointer – drums; Cliff Orsi – bass	Keith More – guitars, backing vocals; Clive Nolan – keyboards, backing vocals; Mick Pointer – drums; John Jowitt – bass, backing vocals; Paul Wrightson – lead vocals	Clive Nolan – keyboards, backing vocals; Mick Pointer – drums; John Jowitt – bass, backing vocals; Paul Wrightson – lead vocals; John Mitchell – guitars, backing vocals	Clive Nolan – keyboards, backing vocals; Mick Pointer – drums; John Mitchell – guitars, backing vocals; Ian Salmon – bass; Rob Sowden – lead vocals	Clive Nolan – keyboards, backing vocals; Mick Pointer – drums; John Mitchell – guitars, backing vocals; John Jowitt – bass; Paul Manzi – lead vocals
2014–2020	2020–2026	2027–present
Clive Nolan – keyboards, backing vocals; Mick Pointer – drums; John Mitchell – guitars, backing vocals; Paul Manzi – lead vocals; Kylan Amos – bass	Clive Nolan – keyboards, backing vocals; Mick Pointer – drums; John Mitchell – guitars, backing vocals; Damian Wilson – lead vocals; Kylan Amos – bass	Clive Nolan – keyboards, backing vocals; Mick Pointer – drums; John Mitchell – guitars, backing vocals; Paul Manzi – lead vocals; Kylan Amos – bass

== Discography ==
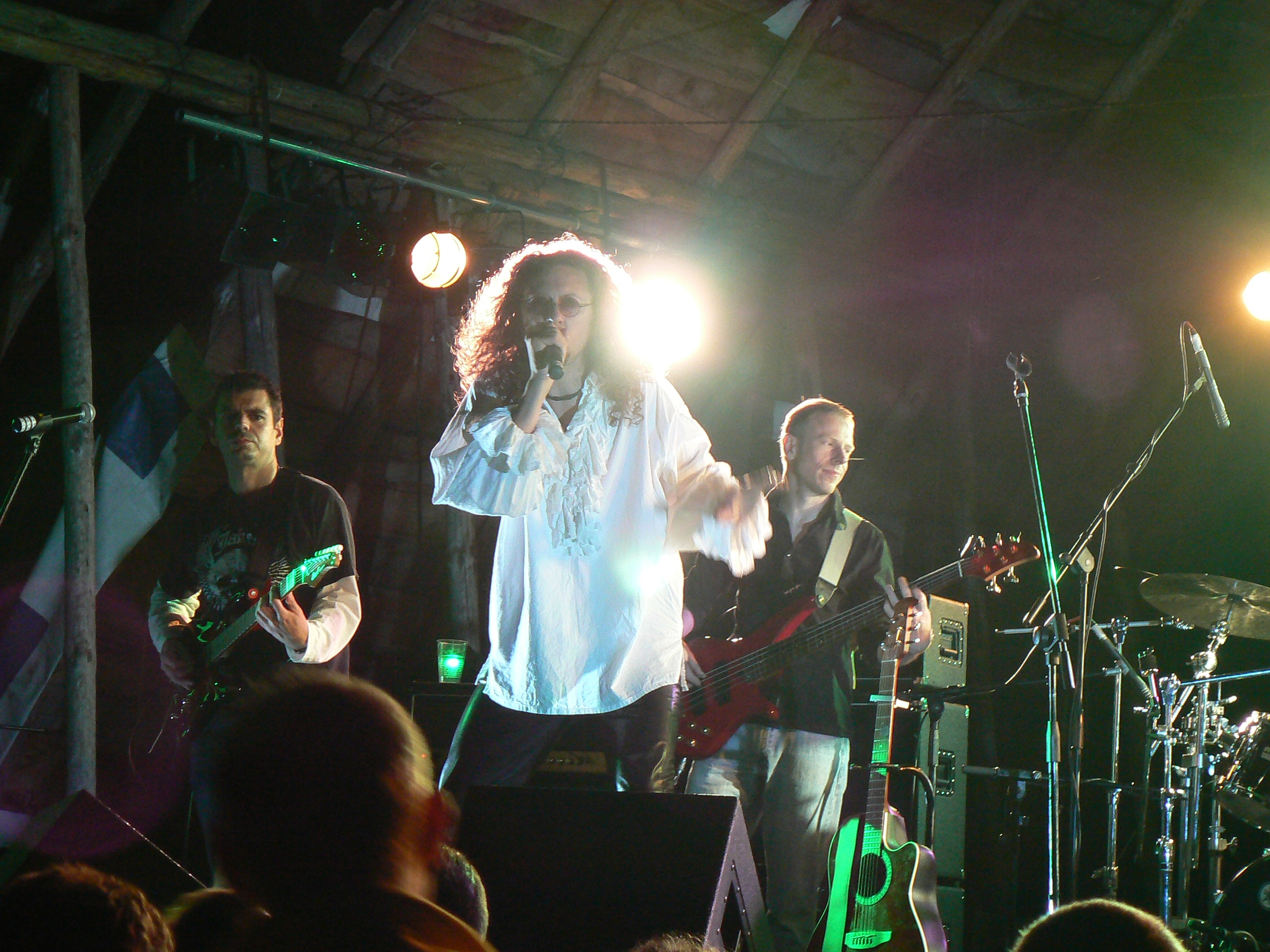
Arena at the Baltic Prog Fest 2007 in Lithuania

=== Studio ===
- Songs from the Lion's Cage (1995)
- Pride (1996)
- The Visitor (1998)
- Immortal? (2000)
- Contagion (2003)
- Pepper's Ghost (2005)
- The Seventh Degree of Separation (2011)
- The Unquiet Sky (2015)
- Double Vision (2018)
- The Theory of Molecular Inheritance (2022)

=== Live ===
- Welcome to the Stage (1997)
- Breakfast in Biarritz (2001)
- Live & Life (2004)
- Arena: Live (2013)
- Arena: XX (2016)
- Lifian (2023)

=== EP ===
- Edits (1996)
- The Cry (1997)
- Contagious (2003)
- Contagium (2003)

=== Compilations ===
- Ten Years On (2006)

=== Videos/DVDs ===
- Caught in the Act (2003) (live)
- Smoke & Mirrors (2006) (live)
- Rapture (2011) (live)
- Arena: XX (2016) (live)
- Re-Visited (2018) (live)

=== Fanclub releases ===
- Welcome Back! To the Stage (1997)
- The Visitor Revisited (1999)
- Unlocking the Cage (2000)
- Radiance (2003)
