= Mark Heaney =

English drummer and composer

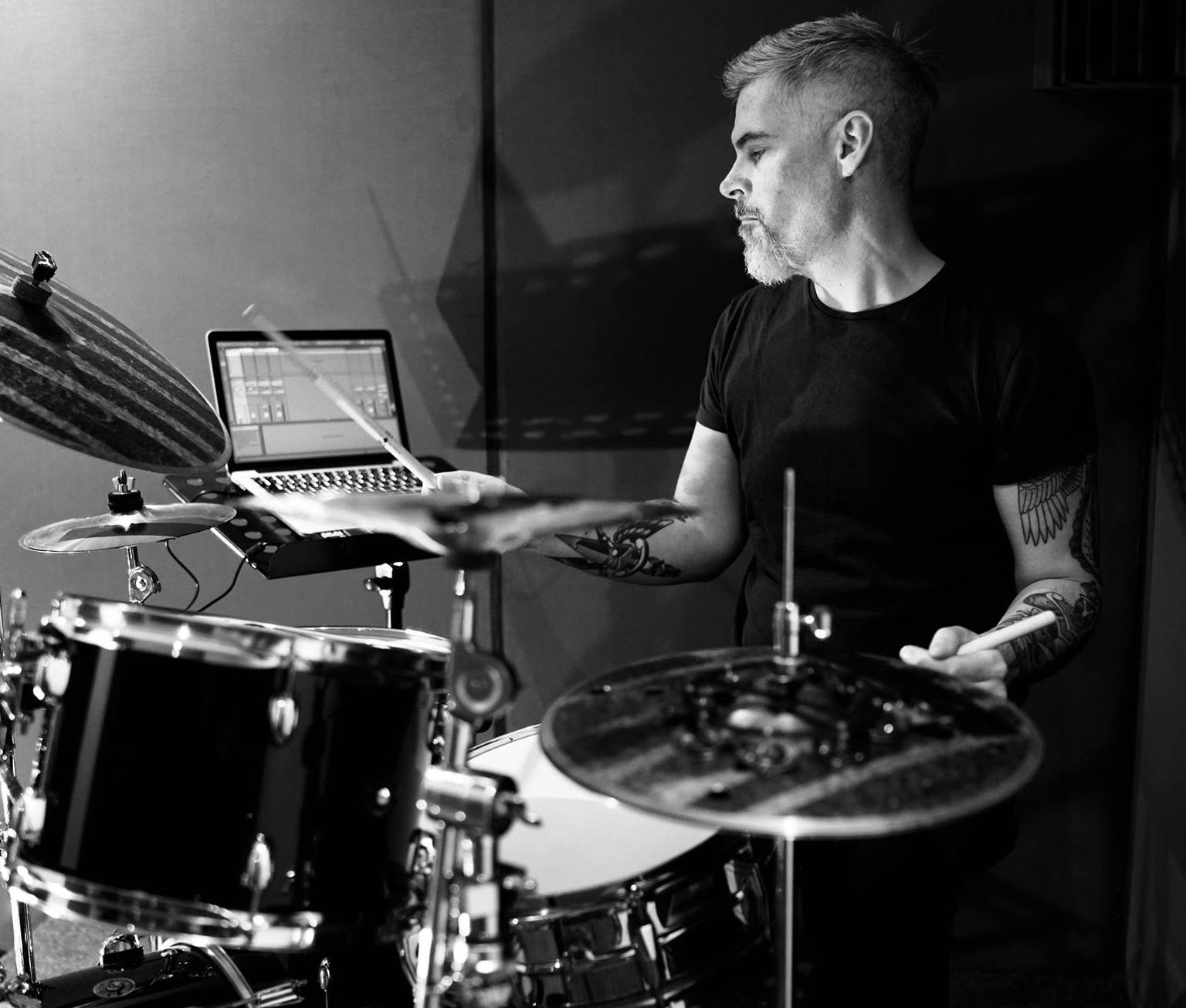
- Mark Heaney in the studio November 2018

Background information
- Born: Mark Andrew Heaney; 14 August 1970 (age 56); Kensington, London, England
- Origin: London, England
- Genres: Rock, pop, jazz, funk
- Occupation: Musician
- Instruments: Drums, percussion
- Years active: 1980–present
- Website: www.markheaney.uk

Mark Andrew Heaney (born 14 August 1970) is an English drummer and composer, hailing from London.

He was a member of The Seahorses (1998–1999), The Shining (2001–2002) and Gang of Four (2006–2013).

Heaney's interest in drumming began at the age of 5, when his father bought him his first drum kit and at the age of 10 he started working all over the UK as the feature drummer in his father's band.

Heaney has recorded/toured the world extensively including tours of China, Japan, North America, Canada, South America, Europe, Australia and New Zealand with artists and producers such as Mark Howard (Bob Dylan, U2, Neil Young), John Squire (The Stone Roses and The Seahorses), Simon Tong, Simon Jones and Nick McCabe (The Verve), Tomoyasu Hotei, The Freelance Hellraiser; Klaxons, Badly Drawn Boy; Shit Disco; Howie Day, Gail Ann Dorsey (David Bowie, Gwen Stefani, The The), Threshold, Youth, Garret Lee, David Botrill, Andy Gill and many others.

Heaney also composes music for use in Film and TV worldwide, having created soundscapes utilising samples and sounds from all genres of music coupled with his own drumming.

He has created bespoke works for many Music Production houses including De Wolfe, EMI, Sony, Microsoft and Wrong Planet music.

Heaney has released five albums as a solo drumming artist. In 2017, his album Fortunes was in the 14 best drum albums as voted by the readers of Rhythm magazine.

In 2018 Heaney released a new studio album called Drumscapes. and in April 2019 he followed it up with Drumscapes Volume 2. The albums featured his live drums against an intricate backdrop of soundscapes fusing music from jazz, trip hop, drum and bass and electronica. Volume 1 was nominated for Drum Album of 2018 by Rhythm magazine.
