= Clive Nolan =

British musician, composer and producer

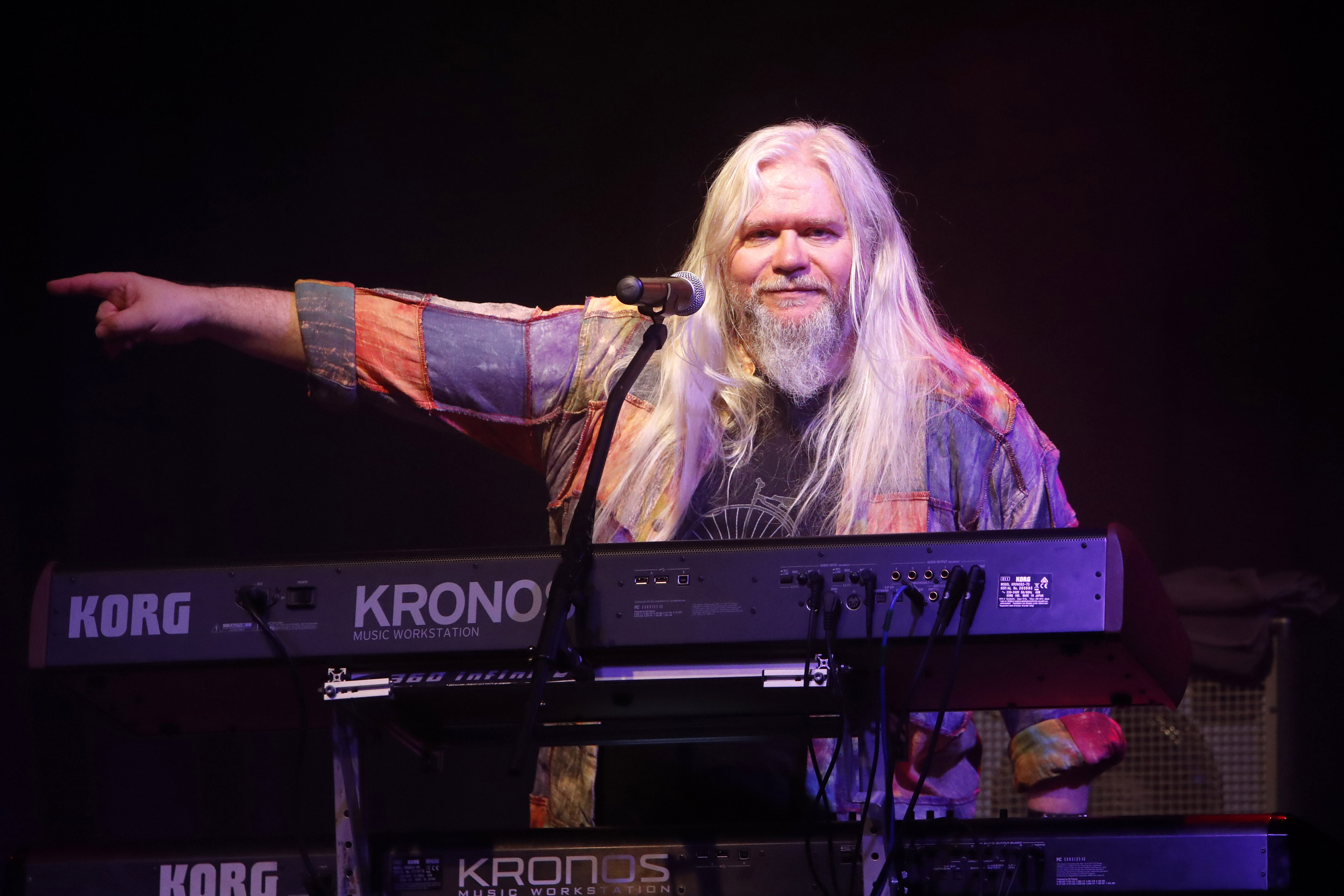
- Nolan at The Boerderij in Zoetermeer 2018

Background information
- Born: 30 June 1961 (age 65); United Kingdom
- Genre: Progressive rock
- Occupations: Singer, songwriter, record producer, writer
- Instruments: Vocals, keyboards
- Label: Verglas

Clive Nolan (born 30 June 1961) is a British musician, composer and producer who has played a prominent role in the development of progressive rock. He has been the regular keyboard player in Pendragon (1986–present), Shadowland (1992–present), Strangers on a Train (1993–1994) and Arena (1995–present), as well as writing lyrics for Arena and producing or co-producing several other bands' albums.

== Early life ==
Nolan was educated at The King’s School, Gloucester. At the age of sixteen, Nolan became the youngest musician in England (at the time) to gain an ALCM diploma in composition from the London College of Music. Holding both a BMus and MMus, he played violin, cello and viola, although his main study while at university was composition, orchestration, musical arrangement and conducting.

== Career ==
In 1982 Nolan won the cup and two medals at the composers competition in the Cheltenham Music Festival.

In 2008 Nolan's rock opera, She, was filmed for DVD in Katowice, Poland. In 2010 the show was again performed in Santa Cruz, Bolivia. Since then, Nolan has started the Caamora Theatre Company,

== Musicals ==
Besides his progressive rock ventures, Nolan has written a rock opera, She, based upon the novel by Rider Haggard. In 2008, it was filmed for DVD in Katowice, Poland. In 2010, the show was again performed, in Santa Cruz, Bolivia. Since then Nolan has started the Caamora Theatre Company, and turned She into a full musical, which was performed for the first time at The Playhouse in Cheltenham in 2012.

Nolan's musical Alchemy finished its run at the Jermyn Street Theatre in the West End of London in August 2014. The libretto is based on the composer's original story. He created a sequel entitled King's Ransom in 2017. Both musicals have now taken the first step towards becoming full theatrical-release feature films.

== Writing ==
Nolan wrote the lyrics for the 43-minute metal song "Crimson II" by Edge of Sanity, which came out in 2003.

In 2005, Nolan wrote a novel called Mephisto Bridge which is as yet unpublished.

== Awards ==
- Classic Rock Society Best Keyboard Player award won in the years: 1995, 1996, 1998, 2005, 2009, 2010 and 2011.
- Honorary Visitor to Santa Cruz, Bolivia, award received in 2010 from Bolivian government for his theatre work in Santa Cruz.

== Discography ==
=== Clive Nolan - solo albums ===
- Skeletons in the Cupboard -Archive – Vol 1 – Verglas 2003
- Hidden Treasure (2015)
- Song of the Wildlands (2021)
- Song of the Winter Throne (2026)

=== With Caamora ===
- Clive Nolan & Agnieszka Swita – Closer – CD – 2006
- Caamora – Walk on Water (Mini-Album) – CD – 2007
- Caamora – "Embrace" (Single) – CD – 2008
- Caamora – Journey's End... An Acoustic Anthology – 2CD – 2008
- Caamora – She – 2CD / 2CD Digipak / 3LP – 2008
- Caamora – She (Live) – DVD / DVD+2CD / 2CD – 2008
- Caamora – She (The Definitive Edition) – 2CD+2DVD+2CD – 2008
- Alchemy the Musical (2013) (CD/DVD/ box set)
- King's Ransom (2017) (CD box set)

=== With Strangers on a Train ===
- The Key – Part 1 – The Prophecy – Verglas 1990
- The Key – Part 2 – The Labyrinth – Verglas 1993

=== With Clive Nolan and Oliver Wakeman ===
- Jabberwocky – Verglas 1999
- The Hound of the Baskervilles – Verglas 2002
- Dark Fables - Elflock Records 2021
- Tales by Gaslight – compilation of first 3 albums - Elflock Records 2021

=== With Casino ===
- Casino – Verglas 1992

=== With Barrett ===
- A Rush of Adrenaline (dDVD2006)

=== With Neo ===
- Broadcast (DVD) – Metal Mind 2007

=== With China Zorilla and Noel Calcaterra (story by Elizeth Schluk) ===
- Otra Vida (2011)

=== With Gandalf's Fist ===
- A Forest of Fey 2014
