= Inside Out Music =

German progressive rock record label

- Parent company: Sony Music Entertainment
- Founded: 1993; 33 years ago
- Founder: Thomas Waber; Michael Schmitz
- Status: Active
- Distributors: The Orchard (US); Sony Music (Rest of World)
- Genre: Progressive rock, progressive metal
- Country of origin: Germany
- Location: Berlin, Germany
- Official website: insideoutmusic.com

InsideOutMusic is a progressive rock record label originally based in Kleve, North Rhine-Westphalia, dedicated to releasing progressive rock, progressive metal and related styles. In 2009, it formed a partnership with Century Media Records and moved its base of operations to Dortmund, also in North Rhine-Westphalia. In August 2016, Century Media and InsideOutMusic were acquired by Sony Music Entertainment and moved their operations to Berlin.

== History ==
The label was founded in 1993 by Thomas Waber and Michael Schmitz and started releasing albums of acts like Symphony X, Spock's Beard, and Enchant. The label then went on to sign prog artists like The Flower Kings, Frost, Fates Warning, Steve Hackett, Transatlantic, Ayreon, King's X, Neal Morse and Devin Townsend.

In 1993 InsideOutMusic signed a worldwide distribution contract with the German music company SPV. In 2009, SPV had to file for bankruptcy, and InsideOutMusic partnered up with Century Media Records, which had secured a worldwide distribution contract with EMI. In 2016 Century Media Records and InsideOutMusic merged with Sony Music Entertainment.

Several important bands of the new school of progressive rock are signed to InsideOutMusic, including Riverside, Leprous, Haken, Pain of Salvation, Caligula's Horse, Between The Buried And Me, Devin Townsend and Pure Reason Revolution. In addition, the label managed to sign some of the biggest names the genre has to offer with Dream Theater, Kansas, Yes, Trevor Rabin and Jethro Tull. This also included many side projects over the years, like James LaBrie's solo albums, Platypus and a selection of Mike Portnoy's side projects including Transatlantic, Liquid Tension Experiment and Sons Of Apollo.

InsideOutMusic also set up a second imprint in 2007 called SuperballMusic. Artists signed to the imprint included Trail Of Dead, Oceansize and Dredg.

The label's founder, Thomas Waber, won the "Guiding Light" award at the 2013 Progressive Music Awards.

Recent signings include BEAT, Crown Lands, Royal Sorrow, Lunatic Soul, OU, Benthos, Asymmetric Universe, Avkrvst, Jakub Zytecki, Holosoil, Sometime In February

== Artists ==
=== Current ===
- AVKRVST
- Beardfish
- Between the Buried and Me
- Big Big Train
- Caligula's Horse
- Crown Lands
- Derek Sherinian
- Devin Townsend
- Dream Theater
- Enchant
- The Flower Kings (except Japan)
- Haken
- Jakko Jakszyk
- James LaBrie
- Jethro Tull
- Jordan Rudess
- Kaipa
- Kansas
- Leprous
- Liquid Tension Experiment
- The Mars Volta
- Nad Sylvan
- Neal Morse
- OU
- Pain of Salvation
- Port Noir
- Pure Reason Revolution
- Riverside
- Roine Stolt
- Sometime in February
- Sons of Apollo
- Star One
- Steve Hackett (except Japan)
- Transatlantic
- Whom Gods Destroy
- Yes

=== Former ===
- Above Symmetry
- ACT (Swedish band)
- Amaseffer
- Arena
- Arjen Anthony Lucassen (Ayreon)
- Asia
- California Guitar Trio
- Chroma Key
- Conspiracy
- David Lindley
- Deadsoul Tribe
- Derek Sherinian
- Dominici
- Evergrey
- Fates Warning
- GPS (except Japan)
- IQ
- It Bites
- Jadis
- The Jelly Jam
- Lonely Robot
- Jerry Gaskill
- Kevin Moore
- Mastermind
- OSI
- Paatos
- Pallas
- Planet X
- Poverty's No Crime
- Ray Wilson*
- Redemption
- RPWL
- Ryo Okumoto
- Saga
- Slavior
- Spock's Beard
- Sound of Contact
- Stream of Passion
- Stealing Axion
- Steve Howe
- Symphony X
- Threshold
- Tiles
- Tim Bowness (No-Man)
- Trey Gunn (former member of King Crimson)
- Ty Tabor
- Ulysses
- Unitopia
- Vanden Plas

=== Revisited Records label ===
This label specializes in the reissue of selected Krautrock and electronic pioneers, including:

- Amon Düül II
- Klaus Schulze
- Kraan
