= Shine =

Shine may refer to:

== Arts and entertainment ==
=== Film and television ===
- Shine (film), a 1996 Australian film based on the life of David Helfgott, a pianist
- Shine, a fictional character in the American animated TV series Shimmer and Shine
- Shine (TV series), a 2025 Thai TV series

=== Literature ===
- Shine (Myracle novel), 2011, by Lauren Myracle
- Shine, a 2013 novel by Candy Gourlay
- Shine (Jessica Jung novel), 2020

=== Music ===
==== Bands ====
- Shine (Hong Kong group), a Hong Kong Cantopop duo
- Shine (Scottish band), folk trio of Alyth McCormack, Corrina Hewat and Mary Macmaster

==== Albums ====
- Shine (Trey Anastasio album), 2005
- Shine, by Average White Band, 1980
- Shine, by Sarah Bettens, 2007
- Shine (Mary Black album), 1997
- Shine (Bond album), 2002
- Shine (Meredith Brooks album), 2004
- Shine (compilation series), released by Polygram from 1995 to 1998
- Shine (Crime & the City Solution album), 1988
- Shine (Edenbridge album), 2004
- Shine (Elan album), 2008
- Shine (Estelle album), 2008
- Shine (Five Star album), 1991
- Shine (Frida album), 1984
- Shine (Indica album), 2014
- Shine (J-Min EP), 2014
- Shine (Boney James album), 2006
- Shine (Kids in the Kitchen album), 1985
- Shine!, by Kyuss, 1996
- Shine (Cyndi Lauper album), 2004
- Shine (Daniel Lanois album), 2003
- Shine (Mary-Jess Leaverland album), 2011
- Shine (Luna Sea album), 1998
- Shine (Martina McBride album), 2009
- Shine (Pat McGee Band album), 2000
- Shine (Joni Mitchell album), 2007
- Shine (Kevin Moore album), 2010
- Shine (Mother Love Bone EP), 1989
- Shine (Anna Nalick EP), 2008
- Shine: The Hits, by Newsboys, 2000
- Shine (Anette Olzon album), 2014
- Shine (Daniel Peixoto EP), 2011
- Shine (Shaman's Harvest album), 2009
- Shine, by Helen Slater, 2010
- Shine (Wale album), 2017
- Shine, by The Wilkinsons, 2001
- Shine, by Pentagon, 2018

==== Songs ====
- "Shine" (1910 song), a popular song with lyrics by Cecil Mack and Lew Brown and music by Ford Dabney
- "Shine" (Vanessa Amorosi song), 2000
- "Shine" (Trey Anastasio song), 2005
- "Shine" (Aswad song), 1994
- "Shine" (Camouflage song), 2015
- "Shine" (Ima Castro song), 1996
- "Shine" (Pentagon song), 2018
- "Shine" (Collective Soul song), 1993
- "Shine" (De Toppers song), 2009
- "Shine" (Five Star song), 1991
- "Shine" (Waylon Jennings song), 1981
- "Shine" (Natália Kelly song), 2013
- "Shine" (Kids in the Kitchen song), 1985
- "Shine" (Cyndi Lauper song), 2002
- "Nexus 4/Shine", by L'Arc-en-Ciel, 2008
- "Shine" (Luna Sea song), 1998
- "Shine" (Krystal Meyers song)
- "Shine" (Motörhead song), 1983
- "Shine" (Sopho Nizharadze song), 2010
- "Shine" (Shannon Noll song), 2005
- "Shine" (Mike Oldfield song), 1986
- "Shine" (Rosemary's Sons song), 2002
- "Shine" (Gwen Stefani song), 2015
- "Shine" (Take That song), 2007
- "Shine" (Tolmachevy Sisters song), 2014
- "Shine" / "Ride On", by TVXQ, 2008
- "Shine" (Luther Vandross song), 2007
- "Shine" (Years & Years song), 2015
- "Shine", by 3 Doors Down from the various artists compilation album AT&T Team USA Soundtrack
- "Shine", by Aly & AJ from Into the Rush
- "Shine", by Aminé from OnePointFive
- "Shine", by B'z from Brotherhood
- "Shine", by Babymetal from Metal Galaxy
- "Shine", by Bond from Shine
- "Shine", by Meredith Brooks from Bad Bad One
- "Shine", by Jeremy Camp from Reckless
- "Shine", by Dog's Eye View from Happy Nowhere
- "Shine", by Doja Cat from Hot Pink
- "Shine", by Hilary Duff from the self-titled album
- "Shine", by Edenbridge from Shine
- "Shine", by Estelle from Shine
- "Shine", by Everclear from Welcome to the Drama Club
- "Shine", by Fear, and Loathing in Las Vegas from New Sunrise
- "Shine", by Frida from Shine, 1984
- "Shine", by Gabrielle from Under My Skin
- "Shine", by Gotthard from Firebirth
- "Shine", by David Gray from A Century Ends
- "Shine", by Ben Harper from Call It What It Is
- "Shine", by Imogen Heap from iMegaphone
- "Shine", by James from The Night Before
- "Shine", by Junkhouse from Fuzz
- "Shine", by Lil Wayne from Lights Out
- "Shine", by Ira Losco from Butterfly
- "Shine", by Lovefreekz, 2004
- "Shine", by Madrugada from Industrial Silence, 1999
- "Shine", by Raven-Symoné from That's So Raven, 2004
- "Shine", by Ricky Martin from Música + Alma + Sexo
- "Shine", by Romeo Miller, as Romeo, from Lottery
- "Shine", by the Mighty Lemon Drops, from World Without End
- "Shine", by Mr. Big from Actual Size, used as the ending theme for the anime Hellsing
- "Shine", by Muse from "Hyper Music" / "Feeling Good", also released as "Shine Acoustic" on Hullabaloo Soundtrack
- "Shine", by Newsboys from Going Public
- "Shine", by Anna Nalick from Shine EP
- "Shine", by Josh Ostrander, as Mondo Cozmo, from Plastic Soul
- "Shine", by Paradise Lost from Paradise Lost
- "Shine", by Quavo from Quavo Huncho
- "Shine", by Riot from Army of One
- "Shine", by Rollins Band from Weight
- "Shine", by Royce da 5'9" from Layers
- "Shine", by The Smith Street Band from More Scared of You Than You Are of Me
- "Shine", by Soulsavers from Angels & Ghosts
- "Shine", by the Stoneman Douglas Drama Club of Marjory Stoneman Douglas High School, 2018
- "Shine", by Strapping Young Lad from Alien
- "Shine (In Your Mind)", by The Apples in Stereo from Fun Trick Noisemaker
- "Shine", by Todrick Hall from Forbidden
- "Shine", by Sevendust from Animosity

==== Other uses in music ====
- Shine!, a musical based on the works of Horatio Alger

== Businesses and organizations ==
- Shine (charity), a British charity which supports people affected by spina bifida and hydrocephalus
- Shine Distillery and Grill, in Portland, Oregon, U.S.
- Shine FM (disambiguation), the name of several radio stations
- Shine Global, an American non-profit media company
- Shine Group, television production company
  - Shine TV, a British media production company
- Shine TV (New Zealand), a Christian TV channel
- Shine Lawyers, an Australian law firm
- SHINE Medical Technologies, an American company
- Shine Wrestling, an American women's wrestling promotion
- Shine, a website for women created in 2008 by Yahoo!
- SHINE, the online brand of the Chinese English-language newspaper Shanghai Daily
- Endemol Shine Group, formerly Sine Group, a Dutch-British TV production and distribution company

== People ==
- Shine (surname), list of people with the surname
- Shine Begho (born 1985), Nigerian media personality
- Shine Louise Houston, an American pornographic filmmaker
- Shine Kuk (Son Yong Kuk, born 1993), a South Korean actress in the Philippines
- Shine (musician), a Burmese musician
- Shine Thura (born 1996), a Burmese footballer
- Shine Tom Chacko (born 1983), an Indian film actor
- Shines, a surname

== Places ==
- Shine, Washington, U.S.

== Other uses ==
- Shine (fundraising event), a British cancer charity event
- Shine (Singapore festival), a youth festival
- Shine (nightclub), in Belfast, Northern Ireland
- SHINE Awards ("Sexual Health in Entertainment"), annual media awards
- SHINE Expert System, a NASA/JPL software-development tool
- LG Shine, a mobile phone by LG Electronics
- NA61/SHINE, a particle physics experiment
- Dance shines, moves in Salsa
- Honda Shine, a motorcycle
- Shine is samatha as a preliminary practice for trekcho

== See also ==
- Schein, a surname (often pronounced 'shine')
- Shyne (disambiguation)
- Shine On (disambiguation)
- Shining (disambiguation)
- Shiny (disambiguation)
- Shyne (born 1979), a Belizean rapper
- Hyperbolic sine (abbreviated sinh, pronounced "shine"), a mathematical function
- Moonshine, a slang term for high-proof distilled spirits
- "Shine, Jesus, Shine", a 1987 Christian song
- "Shine, Perishing Republic", a poem by Robinson Jeffers, 1925
- "Shine, Shine", a song by Barry Gibb, 1984
- Shinee, South Korean boy band
