= Schein =

Schein is a surname. Notable people with the surname include:

- Charles Schein (1928–2003), French polymer chemist
- David D. Schein (born 1951), American author and academic
- Edgar Schein (born 1928), American business theorist and psychologist
- Johann Hermann Schein (1586–1630), German composer
- Marcel Schein (1902–1960), American physicist

== See also ==
- Shine (disambiguation)
- Shein
