= Viaspace =

- Type: Public
- Traded as: Expert Market: VSPC
- Genre: clean energy
- Founded: ViaSpace 1998; Viaspace 2005
- Headquarters: Walnut, United States
- Key people: Dr. Carl Kukkonen (CEO); Mr. Sung Hsien Chang
- Owner: Dr. Carl Kukkonen
- Divisions: Renewable Energy; Alternative Energy; Monitoring Systems
- Subsidiaries: DMFCC; Viaspace Green Energy; Ionfinity
- Website: www.viaspace.com

Viaspace is a clean energy company focused on commercializing technologies from NASA, Caltech, University of Southern California and the United States Department of Defense. The company operates in the alternative energy, renewable energy, and chemical sensing sectors. The company is associated with the Jet Propulsion Lab (JPL) and the California Institute of Technology through its CEO, Dr. Carl Kukkonen (the former Director of the Center for Space Microelectronics Technology (CSMT) and Manager of Supercomputing at the NASA Jet Propulsion Laboratory).

== History ==
Viaspace was founded in 1998 as a Caltech/NASA spin-off. The company began with the objective of transforming space and defense technologies that were originally developed at JPL into commercial products.

In 1998, Viaspace signed a memorandum of understanding with RGC to commercialize a Quantum well infrared photodetector. This led to a joint venture partnership between the two companies called QWIP Technologies (QWIPTECH), which was incorporated in December 1998. Dr. Carl Kukkonen, CEO of Viaspace, served as initial CEO of QWIP Technologies until RGC acquired 100% of QWIPTECH in 2000. Since RGC's QWIPTECH acquisition, Viaspace has had no stake in QWIPTECH nor holds any Quantum Well Infrared Photodetector patents.

In the summer of 1998, Viaspace also signed a memorandum of understanding with Omicron Technologies to form a joint venture for the commercialization of applications of a technology known as Active Pixel Sensors (APS). It was anticipated at the time of the joint venture that APS technology would be a strong competitor in its field and ultimately have a chance of replacing the widely used Charged Coupled Devices (CCDs) used in imaging technology. However, in 2000, Omicron announced that it had dropped out of the project due to financial issues. Viaspace decided to discontinue commercialization efforts for APS technology because it would be too costly. Commercialization of the APS technology by Omicron and Viaspace never materialized; however, Viaspace reacquired three patents from the failed Omicron partnership. These three patents are not associated with the imaging technology, but rather, in the field of radio satellite technology. The three radio satellite technology patents reacquired through the failed Omicron/ViaSpace Joint Venture are being applied toward Viaspace's inactive eCARmerce Inc. subsidiary, although there are no plans to further develop the eCARmerce subsidiary toward commercialization at this time.

In 1999, a company called Spectrasensors Inc acquired exclusive patent rights from NASA and Caltech to commercialize gas sensor technology. SpectraSensors became a Viaspace subsidiary in which Dr. Carl Kukkonen was CEO. In 2001 a company called Tunable Photonics was spun off from SpectraSensors. Dr. Carl Kukkonen served as CEO of ViaSpace, SpectraSensors, and Tunable Photonics during 2001. In 2002, a company called FiberSpace acquired Tunable Photonics. In 2003, SpectraSensors reacquired the remaining intellectual property from Tunable Photonics. Presently, SpectraSensors is a profitable company separate from Viaspace.

On August 14, 2000, Viaspace and Hewlett Packard announced a strategic alliance in which HP would provide US$10 million to Viaspace for commercialization of new technologies. Five million of HP's $10 million went to the development of Viachange.com, which Viaspace no longer operates.

In 2002, a new company, Direct Methanol Fuel Cell Corporation (DMFCC) was formed. DMFCC, Caltech and USC signed a letter of intent for DMFCC to acquire rights to 22 issued and over 40 pending U.S. and foreign patents. These include the original and fundamental patent for using methanol dissolved in water as the fuel for Direct Methanol Fuel Cells. In exchange, Caltech and USC became equity shareholders in DMFCC and receive a royalty on sales. Dr. Carl Kukkonen was and continues to operate as CEO of DMFCC.

In 2005, Viaspace became a public company through a merger between ViaSpace and Global Wide Production. The name ViaSpace was changed to Viaspace (all caps). Dr. Carl Kukkonen remained CEO, Mr. Amjad Abdallat took the position of vice president and chief operating officer, and Mr. Stephen Muzi became the chief financial officer, Secretary, and Treasurer of Viaspace. At the beginning of 2006, DMFCC exercised an option for a worldwide license to 50 issued and 50 pending fuel cell patents from Caltech and USC. DMFCC currently owns 65 issued and 33 pending patents related to fuel cells.

In 2006, Viaspace's wholly owned security and homeland defense subsidiary, Arroyo Sciences Inc., was renamed Viaspace Security Inc. In 2007, Viaspace Security's expert system software, "SHINE Expert System", licensed from Caltech, was awarded the NASA Space Act Award.

In May 2007, Viaspace established a new subsidiary Viaspace Energy. In October 2008, Viaspace entered the biofuels market with the announcement of the acquisition of Inter-Pacific Arts Corp (IPA), a company with a license to grow a fast-growing grass. IPA also sells framed art. The framed art business of IPA is Viaspace's only non-high-technology business unit and is being used to fund the growth of the grass segment of the business. Viaspace sold its humidity sensor line in April 2008 in order to focus on near term projects.

Viaspace created Viaspace Green Energy in 2009 as its alternative energy subsidiary. Viaspace is currently seeking or already has undisclosed contracts for DMFCC products and Giant King Grass products. In 2010 Viaspace announced the launch of its first product, Green Logs. About a month later, Viaspace Green Energy announced its first power plant MOU.

Presently, two of the three Viaspace business units (the alternative energy and chemical sensing units) are based on exclusive technologies developed by JPL and funded by NASA and the DOD. The renewable energy business unit is based on a worldwide license granted by China Gate to grow Giant King Grass, a non-genetically modified hybrid grass.

== Subsidiaries ==
=== Direct Methanol Fuel Cell Corporation ===
For the alternative energy market, Viaspace subsidiary Direct Methanol Fuel Cell Corporation develops and manufactures disposable fuel cartridges for fuel cell powered electronic devices such as notebook computers, mobile phones and military systems. Caltech and USC are equity shareholders in DMFCC and will receive royalties on any sales. DMFCC currently owns 65 issued and 33 pending patents related to fuel cells.

Laws forbidding methanol and other fuels onboard aircraft has deterred large OEMs from proceeding with commercialization of fuel cell powered devices. The regulation and safety standards of fuel cells is one cause of the long delay for the roll out of Direct Methanol Fuel Cell powered devices. The decisions to allow Direct Methanol Fuel Cells onboard aircraft will enhance the future prospect of Viaspace.

=== Viaspace Green Energy ===
For the renewable energy markets, its subsidiary, Viaspace Green Energy, is cultivating Giant King Grass, a proprietary, fast-growing perennial grass for the production of liquid biofuels for transportation, and as a renewable substitute or replacement for coal as the heat source in stationary electricity generating power plants. By June 2010, the company had 279 acres (113 ha) of land under cultivation.

=== Ionfinity ===
Through its subsidiary Ionfinity, Viaspace is involved in collaborations with Caltech and NASA's Jet Propulsion Laboratory to develop and commercialize new sensor technology that can detect very small amounts of hazardous materials such as explosives, chemical/biological weapons, toxic gases and drugs. Ionfinity's sensors are based on mass spectrometry technology. Ionfinity is partnered with General Dynamics Corp., Sionex Corp., and Imaginative Technologies LLC.
