= Shine (surname) =

Shine is a surname. Notable people with the surname include:

- Abrid Shine, Indian film director, screenwriter and fashion photographer in the Malayalam film industry
- Betty Shine, (1929–2002), English author, opera singer and spiritualist
- Bill Shine (born 1963), former White House Communications Director under President Donald Trump
- Bill Shine (actor) (1911–1997), British theatre, film and television actor
- Brad Shine (born 1959), former Australian rules football player
- Brendan Shine (born 1947), Irish folk and country singer, television presenter and accordion player from Athlone
- Clare Shine (born 1995), Irish international footballer who plays for SWPL club Glasgow City
- DJ Shine (born 1974), stage name of Lim Byung-wook, a Korean Rapper, Producer, DJ formerly associated with popular Korean hip hop group, Drunken Tiger
- Donal Shine (born 1989), Gaelic footballer
- Fabienne Shine (born 1944), French and Jewish model, actress and musician
- John Shine (born 1946), Australian biochemist
- Keith Shine (born 1958), Regius Professor of Meteorology and Climate Science at the University of Reading
- Ken Shine (born 1947), Australian rugby league coach
- Kevin Shine (born 1969), former first-class cricketer and former coach of Somerset County Cricket Club
- Kia Shine (born 1980), stage name of Nakia Shine Coleman, an American hip hop recording artist and producer from Memphis
- Michael Shine (born 1953), former United States Olympic athlete
- Pat Shine (fl. 2000s), American baseball coach
- Richard Shine (born 1950), Australian evolutionary biologist and ecologist
- Tara Shine, Irish environmental scientist, policy advisor and science communicator
- Thomas Shine (1872–1955), Irish Roman Catholic bishop
- Wilfred Shine (1864–1939), British actor and a specialist in melodrama

== See also ==
- Shine (disambiguation)
- Shines, a surname
