= Shine FM =

Shine FM may refer to:

- stations owned and operated by Olivet Nazarene University in the United States:
  - WHZN in New Whiteland, Indiana
  - WONU in Kankakee, Illinois
  - WTMK in Wanatah, Indiana
  - WUON in Morris, Illinois
  - W237BY in Mason, Michigan
- stations owned and operated by Touch Canada Broadcasting in Alberta, Canada:
  - CJGY-FM in Grand Prairie
  - CJRY-FM in Edmonton
  - CJSI-FM in Calgary
- a station owned and operated by Peter & John Radio Fellowship in the United States:
  - WRBS-FM in Baltimore, Maryland

== See also ==
- Shine (disambiguation)
