= Lado a Lado (soundtrack) =

Soundtrack album by Various Artists
- Released: November 29, 2012
- Recorded: Various times
- Genre: Samba, pop, electronic, soundtrack
- Length: 1:01:31
- Label: Som Livre
- Producer: Mariozinho Rocha

Lado a Lado - Música Original de Roger Henri

Soundtrack album by Roger Henri
- Released: February 2013
- Genre: Incidental music, soundtrack
- Length: 1:15:06
- Label: Som Livre

Lado a Lado is the soundtrack album from the 2012 Brazilian telenovela of the same name, produced by Mariozinho Rocha, and it was released on November 29, 2012, by Som Livre.

In February 2013, Som Livre released a second soundtrack album, containing the instrumental soundtrack of the telenovela, entitled Lado a Lado - Música Original de Roger Henri (English: "Lado a Lado - Original Music by Roger Henri"). All songs were written and composed by Roger Henri.

The telenovela's soundtrack innovated by blending traditional genres, such as samba and MPB, with modern styles, like rap and electronic music.

== Artwork ==
The cover sleeve of the album depicts the telenovela's main actors Thiago Fragoso, Marjorie Estiano, Camila Pitanga and Lázaro Ramos, dressed as their respective characters. The cover sleeve of the instrumental album depicts the telenovela's logo.

== Track listing ==
No.	Title	Artist(s)	Length
1.	"A Flor E O Espinho"	Sururu Na Roda	3:23
2.	"Grande Amor"	Martinho da Vila	4:16
3.	"De Onde Vem A Calma"	Los Hermanos	4:10
4.	"Namora Comigo"	Mart'nália feat. Djavan	3:45
5.	"Quarto de Dormir"	Marcelo Jeneci	4:48
6.	"Sei"	Nando Reis and Os Infernais	3:19
7.	"Inferno"	Nação Zumbi	4:40
8.	"Samba de Primeira"	Marcelo D2	2:54
9.	"A Voz do Morro"	Diogo Nogueira	3:20
10.	"Liberdade! Liberdade! Abra as Asas sobre Nós"	Dominguinhos do Estácio	3:12
11.	"O Mundo É Um Moinho"	Beth Carvalho	2:58
12.	"Me Deixa Em Paz"	Milton Nascimento and Alaíde Costa	3:02
13.	"O Orvalho Vem Caindo / Fita Amarela / Até Amanhã / Palpite Infeliz"	Gal Costa	4:27
14.	"Isto É Bom"	Mariene de Castro	4:48
15.	"Olhos Castanhos"	Daniel Peixoto feat. George Michael	4:00
16.	"Para Uso Exclusivo da Casa"	Dhi Ribeiro	4:21
Total length:			01:01:31

Lado a Lado - Música Original de Roger Henri
No.	Title	Length
1.	"Mudanças Do Tempo (Sinfonia Nº 3)"	2:50
2.	"Nova Emboscada"	1:23
3.	"Sombras"	2:30
4.	"Calçada Escura"	2:41
5.	"Disfarçando"	1:40
6.	"Delicada Sedução"	1:42
7.	"Acontecendo"	1:19
8.	"A Grande Paixão (Stürmisch Bewegt, Mit Grösster Vehemenz)"	2:25
9.	"Na Serra"	2:10
10.	"Ataque No Escuro"	2:54
11.	"Ginga do Amor"	1:22
12.	"A Retirada"	3:15
13.	"As Árvores do Lago"	1:43
14.	"Janela do Alto"	1:45
15.	"Lado A Lado (Larghetto Da Sinfonia Do Novo Mundo)"	2:43
16.	"Caminho do Mar"	1:38
17.	"Fados e Fotos"	3:24
18.	"Capricho da Dançarina"	1:00
19.	"Começo De Tudo (Largo Da Sinfonia Do Novo Mundo)"	4:02
20.	"Outra Paisagem"	2:03
21.	"A Vista do Lago"	2:11
22.	"Audaciosa"	1:41
23.	"Vontade"	4:16
24.	"Cercando"	2:51
25.	"Minha Saudade"	2:56
26.	"Batuque Sensual"	1:36
27.	"Escondidinho"	2:10
28.	"Na Rua"	3:17
29.	"O Futuro Livre"	1:30
30.	"O Inesperado"	3:52
31.	"Na Calada"	2:23
32.	"Leveza do Rio"	1:34
Total length:		01:15:06

Notes

- Lado a Lado - Música Original de Roger Henri: All songs were written and composed by Roger Henri.

== See also ==
- Lado a Lado
- List of Lado a Lado characters
