= Ponding =

Pooling of water in the built environment

In civil engineering, ponding is the (typically) unwanted pooling of water, typically on a flat roof or roadway. Ponding water accelerates the deterioration of many materials, including seam adhesives in single-ply roof systems, steel equipment supports, and particularly roofing asphalt. On low-slope asphalt roofs, ponding water allows the oil solvent components of the asphalt to leach out and evaporate, leaving the roof membrane brittle and susceptible to cracking and leaking in the ponding location. The time taken for water to saturate a zone, usually from rainfall, causing a pond to form, is referred to as the "ponding time".

== Cause ==
Most flat roof systems (properly called "low-slope roof systems") are designed with a slight pitch to shed water off the sides, usually into gutters, scuppers, internal drains, or a combination of these. When a scupper or drain is clogged or fails for other reasons, storm water tends to pool around that low area. Over time, with each passing storm, the weight of the storm water will deflect the structural system beyond the structure's bending point, thus allowing a bigger puddle to form. As a bigger puddle forms more weight is applied to the structural system causing more bending, allowing an even bigger puddle, then more weight, until the structure fails.

== Construction codes ==
In the construction industry, the National Roofing Contractors Association (NRCA) defines roof ponding as "water that remains on a roof surface longer than 48 hours after the termination of the most recent rain event".

According to the 2009 International Building Code Chapter 15 "Roof Assemblies and Roof Top Structures" & Chapter 16 "Structural Design";

When scuppers are used for secondary (emergency overflow) roof drainage, the quantity, size, location and inlet elevation of the scuppers shall be sized to prevent the depth of ponding water from exceeding that for which the roof was designed ... Ponding instability. For roofs with a slope less than 1/4 inch per foot [1.19 degrees (0.0208 rad)], the design calculations shall include verification of adequate stiffness to preclude progressive deflection in accordance with Section 8.4 of ASCE 7.

== Ponding on land ==
When water is diverted into a lower area that has no outlet or is not suitable for drainage, water will begin to pool, and over time the weight of the water will create a deeper pool, allowing more water to sit, eventually creating a permanent water feature. Some municipalities recognize this as an issue on private land, such as the City of Indianapolis.

A municipality in New Zealand has noted that "groundwater ponding is a chronic problem, that results in damp housing and waterlogged sections. The damage that it causes is less apparent than the damaging events associated with floods, but the duration of groundwater ponding, which can last for several months, makes it a serious issue for those affected".

Ponding that forms on paved surfaces, like streets or parking lots that are not properly pitched, will cause issues such as deep puddles and crocodile cracking.

== See also ==
- Horton overland flow
- Stabilization pond
