= John Van Maanen =

American academic (b. 1943)

John Eastin Van Maanen (born 1943) is an American organizational theorist, Professor of Organization Studies at the MIT Sloan School of Management, and best known for his contributions to qualitative studies in management and to organizational ethnography.

His studies included longitudinal researches of policemen, fishermen, Disneyland operators, and London detectives. His publications include also methodological studies on writing organizational ethnographies and on power relations in workplace. His Tales of the Field on Writing Ethnography (University of Chicago Press, 1988) became a classic reading in many doctoral programs in management around the world. He also recently commented on "On the Run", by Alice Goffman. His other contributions include studies of high tech industries.

== Selected publications ==
Books, a selection:

- Van Maanen, John. Breaking in: A consideration of organizational socialization. Defense Technical Information Center, 1972.
- Van Maanen, John Eastin, and Edgar Henry Schein. Toward a theory of organizational socialization. 1977.
- Van Maanen, John, and Stephen R. Barley. Occupational communities: Culture and control in organizations. No. TR-ONR-10. ALFRED P SLOAN SCHOOL OF MANAGEMENT CAMBRIDGE MA, 1982.
- Maanen, John Van. Qualitative methodology. Beverly Hills: Sage 1983.
- Van Maanen, John. Tales of the field: On writing ethnography. University of Chicago Press, 2011.
