= Marcel Schein =

Slovak-born American physicist (1902–1960)

Marcel Schein (June 9, 1902 – February 20, 1960) was a Slovak-born American physicist, best known for his work on cosmic rays. He is the father of former MIT professor Edgar Schein.

== Biography ==
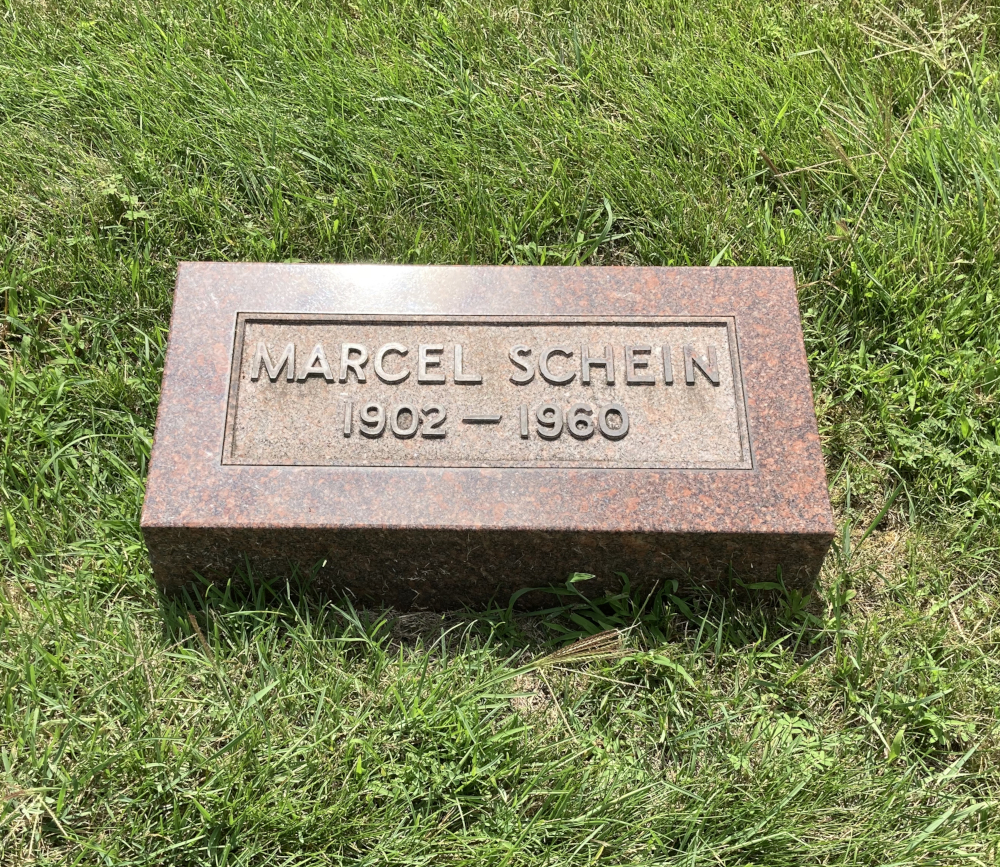
Schein's grave at Oak Woods Cemetery

Marcel Schein was born in Trstená, Kingdom of Hungary on June 9, 1902.

He died in Chicago on February 20, 1960, and was buried at Oak Woods Cemetery.

== Education and career ==
Schein studied at the universities of Vienna, Würzburg and Zurich, where he got his PhD with the best mark, magna cum laude. In the following years he taught at several European universities. In 1938, he emigrated to the United States where he joined the University of Chicago's Institute of Physics as staff researcher. In 1943, he joined the university's faculty. He was promoted to a full professor three years later in 1946. From 1935 to 1936, he headed the Department of Physics at the Odessa German Pedagogical Institute.

== Bibliography ==
- Study of New Ultraviolet Rays from the Sun / M. G. Schein, M. L. Katz, I. A. Klass // Proceedings of the Elbrus Expedition of 1934 and 1935. – Moscow–Leningrad, 1936. – P. 91–108.
- Problems in cosmic ray physics, 1946

== See also ==
- Schein
