= Charles Schein =

Romanian businessman (1928–2003)

Charles Schein (September 25, 1928 – May 1, 2003) was a polymer chemist. A political refugee and (Jewish) survivor of the Holocaust from Romania, he arrived in Paris in 1946 and enrolled at the University of Paris. After receiving his degree, Schein joined the adhesives-formulating group at the French branch of Honeywell. There he developed the modern form of polyvinylchloride (PVC)-based seam sealant used in the manufacturing of automobiles. In the late 1950s, with Honeywell's consent, he founded Caourep. In the 1960s and 1970s the Caourep Group followed French and other European OEM automotive producers as they expanded in the first postwar recovery wave of globalization. Caourep established its own plants or licensees in every country in which Renault, Peugeot, Fiat, VW, and Daimler-Benz operated directly or by licensing. By the late 1970s, Caourep had become a supplier to the overseas operations of Ford, GM, and Chrysler. By 1977, Caourep was the largest producer of OEM automotive adhesives and sealants in the world.
