= Stephen R. Barley =

American business theorist (born 1953)

- Born: February 16, 1953 (age 73)
- Citizenship: American
- Education: College of William and Mary; Ohio State University; MIT Sloan School of Management
- Known for: Contributions to structuration theory and Work and Technology Studies
- Scientific career
- Fields: Organizational theory Technological change
- Doctoral students: Paul Leonardi

Stephen R. Barley (born February 16, 1953) is an American organizational theorist and Christian A. Felipe Professor of Technology Management at the College of Engineering at the University of California Santa Barbara. Previously he was The Richard W. Weiland Professor in the School of Engineering at Stanford University and the Stanford Graduate School of Education. Barley's research focuses on the role of technology in organizational change and organizational/occupational culture.

== Biography ==
Barley received his A.B. in English from the College of William and Mary in 1975, a M.A. in Student Personnel Administration from the Ohio State University in 1977, and a Ph.D. from the MIT Sloan School of Management in 1984. His dissertation was entitled "The Professional, the semi-professional, and the machine: The social implications of computer based imaging in radiology." His 1986 paper "Technology as an occasion for structuring" has been cited over 4300 times.

Barley was a professor in the School of Industrial and Labor Relations at Cornell University between 1984 and 1994 and joined the Department of Management Science and Engineering at Stanford University in 1994. The National Research Council and the National Academy of Sciences' committee on the changing occupational structure was co-chaired by Barley in 1998 and 1999.

Barley was editor of the Administrative Science Quarterly from 1993 to 1997 and has served on the editorial boards for the Academy of Management Journal, the Journal of Managagement Studies, and Organization Science.

== Selected publications ==
Books:

- Van Maanen, John, and Stephen R. Barley. Occupational communities: Culture and control in organizations. No. TR-ONR-10. ALFRED P SLOAN SCHOOL OF MANAGEMENT CAMBRIDGE MA, 1982.
- Tolbert, P. S.; Barley, Stephen R. (1991). Professions and Organizations. Special edition of Research in the Sociology of Organizations: Organizations and Professions. Vol. 8. Greenwich, CT: JAI Press.
- Barley, Stephen R. (1996). The New World of Work. Washington, D.C.: National Planning Association. ISBN 0-902594-54-0.
- Barley, Stephen R.; Orr, J. (1997). Between Craft and Science: Technical Work in the United States. Ithaca, NY: ILR Press. ISBN 0-8014-8366-2.
- Kochan, T. A.; Barley, S. R. (1999). The Changing Nature of Work and Its Implications for Occupational Analysis. Washington, D.C.: National Research Council.
- Barley, Stephen R.; Kunda, G (2004). Gurus, Hired Guns and Warm Bodies: Itinerant Experts in a Knowledge Economy. Princeton, NJ: Princeton University Press. ISBN 0-691-12795-6.

Articles, a selection:

- Barley, Stephen R. "Technology as an occasion for structuring: Evidence from observations of CT scanners and the social order of radiology departments." Administrative science quarterly (1986): 78–108.
- Barley, Stephen R., and Gideon Kunda. "Design and devotion: Surges of rational and normative ideologies of control in managerial discourse." Administrative Science Quarterly (1992): 363–399.
- Barley, Stephen R., and Pamela S. Tolbert. "Institutionalization and structuration: Studying the links between action and institution." Organization studies 18.1 (1997): 93–117.
