= Paul Leonardi =

American business theorist

Paul M. Leonardi
- Citizenship: American
- Education: Saint Mary's College of California, B.A. University of Colorado at Boulder, M.A. Stanford University, Ph.D.
- Known for: Studies of technology and materiality Information and network change Discursive uses of technology
- Scientific career
- Fields: Management; Organizational Studies; Communication; Information Systems
- Workplaces: University of California, Santa Barbara
- Doctoral advisor: Stephen R. Barley

Paul M. Leonardi was the Duca Family Professor of Technology Management at the University of California, Santa Barbara. He was also the Investment Group of Santa Barbara Founding Director of the Master of Technology Management Program. Leonardi moved to UCSB to found the Technology Management Program and start its Master of Technology Management and Ph.D. programs. Before joining UCSB, Leonardi was a faculty member in the School of Communication, the McCormick School of Engineering, and the Kellogg School of Management at Northwestern University.

Leonardi's research focuses on how companies can design their organizational networks and implement new technologies to more effectively create and share knowledge. He was particularly interested in how data intensive technologies, such as simulation and social media tools, enable new ways to access, store, and share information; how the new sources of information these technologies provide can change work routines and communication partners; and how shifts in employees' work and communication alter the nature of an organization's expertise. His work on these topics cuts across the fields of Organization Studies, Communication Studies, and Information Systems and has been published in leading journals in these fields, such as Academy of Management Journal, Academy of Management Review, Journal of Communication, Human Communication Research, Information Systems Research, MIS Quarterly, and Organization Science. He was also the author of three books Car Crashes Without Cars: Lessons About Simulation Technology and Organizational Change from Automotive Design (2012, MIT Press), Materiality and Organizing: Social Interaction in a Technological World(2012, Oxford University Press), and Technology Choices: Why Occupations Differ in Their Embrace of New Technologies (2015, MIT Press).

He won awards for his research from the Academy of Management, American Sociological Association, International Communication Association, National Communication Association, and Association for Information Systems

Over the past decade, he consulted with for-profit and non-profit organizations about how to manage the human aspects of new technology implementation. His recent engagements have focused on helping companies to improve communication between departments, to use social technologies to enhance internal knowledge sharing, and to strengthen global product development operations.

== Published works ==
- Young, L. E., & Leonardi, P. M. (2012). Social Issue Emergence on the Web: A Dual Structurational Model. Journal of Computer-Mediated Communication, 17, 231-246.
- Contractor, N. S., Monge, P. R., & Leonardi, P. M. (2011). Multidimensional Networks and the Dynamics of Sociomateriality: Bringing Technology Inside the Network. International Journal of Communication, 5, 682-720.
- Leonardi, P. M. (2011). When Flexible Routines Meet Flexible Technologies: Affordance, Constraint, and the Imbrication of Human and Material Agencies. MIS Quarterly, 35(1), 147-167.
- Leonardi, P. M. (2011). Innovation Blindness: Culture, Frames, and Cross-Boundary Problem Construction in The Development of New Technology Concepts. Organization Science, 22(2), 347-369.
- Leonardi, P. M.; Barley, S. R. (2010). "What's Under Construction Here? Social Action, Materiality, and Power in Constructivist Studies of Technology and Organizing". Academy of Management Annals. 4: 1–51. doi:10.1080/19416521003654160. S2CID 1178715.
- Bailey, D. E.; Leonardi, P. M.; Chong, J. (2010). "Minding the Gaps: Technology Interdependence and Coordination in Knowledge Work". Organization Science. 21 (3): 713–730. doi:10.1287/orsc.1090.0473. S2CID 10453259.
- Leonardi, P. M. (2010). Digital Materiality? How Artifacts Without Matter, Matter. First Monday, 15(6), Available from: https://firstmonday.org/article/view/3036/2567
- Leonardi, P. M. (2010). "From Road to Lab to Math: The Co-Evolution of Technological, Regulatory, and Organizational Innovations in Automotive Crash Testing". Social Studies of Science. 40 (2): 243–274. doi:10.1177/0306312709346079. PMID 20527322. S2CID 11704282.
- Leonardi, P. M.; Treem, J. W.; Jackson, M. H. (2010). "The Connectivity Paradox: Using Technology to Both Increase and Decrease Perceptions of Distance in Distributed Work Arrangements". Journal of Applied Communication Research. 37 (4): 85–105. doi:10.1080/00909880903483599. S2CID 145264198.
- Leonardi, P. M. (2009). "Crossing the Implementation Line: The Mutual Constitution of Technology and Organizing Across Development and Use Activities". Communication Theory. 19 (3): 277–310. doi:10.1111/j.1468-2885.2009.01344.x. S2CID 9667654.
- Leonardi, P. M. (2009). "Why Do People Reject New Technologies and Stymie Organizational Changes of which They Are in Favor? Exploring Misalignments Between Social Interactions and Materiality". Human Communication Research. 35 (3): 407–441. doi:10.1111/j.1468-2958.2009.01357.x. S2CID 144912826.
- Leonardi, P. M.; Jackson, M. H.; Diwan, A. (2009). "The Enactment-Externalization Dialectic: Rationalization and the Persistence of Counterproductive Technology Design Practices in Student Engineering". Academy of Management Journal. 52 (2): 400–420. doi:10.5465/AMJ.2009.37315471. S2CID 17650315.
- Leonardi, P. M.; Jackson, M. H. (2009). "Technological Grounding: Enrolling Technology as a Discursive Resource to Justify Cultural Change in Organizations". Science, Technology, & Human Values. 34 (3): 393–418. doi:10.1177/0162243908328771. S2CID 113943000.
- Leonard, P. M. (2008). "Indeterminacy and the Discourse of Inevitability in International Technology Management". Academy of Management Review. 33 (4): 975–984. doi:10.5465/AMR.2008.34422017. S2CID 15949120.
- Leonardi, P. M.; Barley, S. R. (2008). "Materiality and Change: Challenges to Building Better Theory About Technology and Organizing". Information and Organization. 18 (3): 159–176. doi:10.1016/j.infoandorg.2008.03.001. S2CID 6053499.
- Leonardi, P. M.; Bailey, D. E. (2008). "Transformational Technologies and the Creation of New Work Practices: Making Implicit Knowledge Explicit in Task-based Offshoring". MIS Quarterly. 32 (2): 411–436. doi:10.2307/25148846. JSTOR 25148846. S2CID 33649439.
- Leonardi, P. M. (2007). "Activating the Informational Capabilities of Information Technology for Organizational Change". Organization Science. 18 (5): 813–831. doi:10.1287/orsc.1070.0284. S2CID 14868023.
- Leonardi, P. M.; Jackson, M. H. (2004). "Technological Determinism and Discursive Closure in Organizational Mergers". Journal of Organizational Change Management. 17 (6): 615–631. doi:10.1108/09534810410564587. S2CID 11710816.
- Leonardi, P. M. (2003). "Problematizing "New Media": Culturally Based Perceptions of Cell Phones, Computers, and the Internet among United States Latinos". Critical Studies in Media Communication. 20 (2): 160–179. doi:10.1080/07393180302778. S2CID 15882691.

All papers are available from the Leonardi's website for academic use only at
