= Shining =

Shining, The Shining or Shinin may refer to:

== Arts and entertainment ==
- The Shining media series from the Stephen King novel:
  - The Shining (novel), a 1977 novel by Stephen King
    - The Shining (film), a 1980 film by Stanley Kubrick starring Jack Nicholson
    - The Shining (miniseries), a 1997 television miniseries
    - The Shining (opera), a 2016 opera by Paul Moravec and Mark Campbell

=== Literature ===
- The Shining, a 1961 novel by Stephen Marlowe

=== Music ===
==== Bands ====
- Shining (Norwegian band), a Norwegian experimental jazz band
- Shining (Swedish band), a Swedish black metal band
- The Shining (band), a band formed by former members of the Verve

==== Albums ====
- Shining (Marcia Hines album), 1976
- Shining (Swallow the Sun album), 2024
- Shining (EP), an EP by Crystal Kay
- The Shining (J Dilla album)
- The Shining, an album by RBX
- Dah Shinin', a 1995 album by Smif-N-Wessun
- The Shining (Violent J album)
- The Shining, an album by IneartheD

==== Songs ====
- "Shining" (song), by DJ Khaled featuring Beyoncé and Jay Z
- "Shining", by Amorphis from Tuonela
- "The Shining", by Anorexia Nervosa from Redemption Process
- "The Shining", by Badly Drawn Boy from The Hour of Bewilderbeast
- "The Shining", by Black Sabbath from The Eternal Idol
- "The Shining", by James from Pleased to Meet You
- "Shining", by The Misfits from American Psycho
- "Shining", by Riyu Kosaka
- "Shining", by X Ambassadors from The Reason
- "Shinin", by Kim Petras from Clarity
- "Shinin", a playable song (skin) in the puzzle video game series, Lumines
- "Shining", by Mac DeMarco from Guitar
- "Shining", by The Dolphin Brothers

=== Video games ===
- Shining (series), a series of fantasy video games made by Sega

== See also ==
- Moonshining
- Nitida (disambiguation)
- Shine (disambiguation)
- Shining Star (disambiguation)
- "The Shinning", a segment of The Simpsons episode "Treehouse of Horror V"
- Spotlighting, a method of hunting nocturnal animals using lights
