= Shyne (disambiguation) =

Shyne (born 1978) is a Belizean politician and former rapper.

Shyne may also refer to:

== Music ==
- Shyne (album), a 2000 album by Shyne

=== Songs ===
- "Shyne", by Swizz Beatz, Shyne and Mashonda from Swizz Beatz Presents G.H.E.T.T.O. Stories, 2002
- "Shyne", by Dounia, 2017
- "Shyne" (song), by Travis Scott and GloRilla, 2025

== People ==
- Sepi Shyne (born 1977), Iranian-born American attorney
- Shyne Johnson, a character from the Fox television series Empire

== See also ==
- Shine (disambiguation)
