= List of Lado a Lado characters =

This article lists the characters featured in the Brazilian Globo telenovela Lado a Lado.

== Main characters ==
Actor	Character
Marjorie Estiano	Laura Camargo Assunção
Thiago Fragoso	Edgar Lemos Vieira
Patrícia Pillar	Constância Camargo Assunção (Baronesa da Boa Vista)
Camila Pitanga	Isabel Nascimento Silva
Lázaro Ramos	José Maria dos Santos (Zé Maria/Zé Navalha)
Rafael Cardoso	Alberto Camargo Assunção Filho (Albertinho)
Alessandra Negrini	Catarina Ribeiro
Maria Padilha	Diva Celeste
Caio Blat	Fernando Lemos Vieira
Emílio de Mello	Carlos Guerra
Sheron Menezzes	Berenice (Bere)
Priscila Sol	Sandra Praxedes
Débora Duarte	Eulália Praxedes
Guilherme Piva	Delegado Heráclito Praxedes
Susana Ribeiro	Teresa Praxedes
Daniel Dalcin	Teodoro Lopes de Freitas
Maria Clara Gueiros	Neusinha Soares (Jacqueline Duvivier)
Paulo Betti	Mário Cavalcanti
Cássio Gabus Mendes	Bonifácio Vieira
Isabela Garcia	Célia Camargo (Celinha)
Zezeh Barbosa	Tia Jurema
Christiana Guinle	Carlota Camargo Passos
Milton Gonçalves	Seu Afonso Nascimento
Tuca Andrada	Frederico Martins
Marcello Melo Jr.	Caniço
Klebber Toledo	Umberto Pontes Ferraz
André Arteche	Luciano Celeste Buarque
Juliane Araújo	Alice Camargo Passos
Werner Schünemann	Dr. Alberto Assunção
Bia Seidl	Margarida Lemos Vieira
Álamo Facó	Quequé
George Sauma	Jonas
César Mello	Francisco dos Anjos (Chico)
Rhaisa Batista	Esther Vieira
Jurema Reis	Gilda
Ana Carbatti	Zenaide
Antonio Pitanga	Túlio
Thiago Amaral	Gustavo Nóbrega de Medeiros
Romis Ferreira	Luiz Neto
Luisa Friese	Matilde
Ana Paula Lopes	Luzia
Rui Ricardo Dias	Percival
Laís Vieira	Etelvina
Claudio Tovar	Padre Olegário
Tião D'Ávila	Isidoro
Rogério Freitas	Haroldo
Marcos Acher	Rodrigues
Daniel Marques	Paiva

== Supporting characters ==
Actor	Character
Ítalo Sasso	Almeidinha
Gustavo Genton	
Hugo Maia	
Maria Sílvia Godoy Radomille	
Guto Silva	

== Child characters ==
Actor	Character
Ana Luiza Abreu	Madalena (Madá)
Cauê Campos	Afonso Nascimento Neto (Elias)
Eliz David	Melissa Ribeiro Vieira
Jorge Amorim	Olavo
Marcio Rangel	Vilmar
Zeca Gurgel	Tião

== Special appearances ==
Actor	Character
Ady Salgado	Dona Dionísia
Anna Sophia Folch	Heloísa
Beatriz Segall	Madame Bensançon
Dudu Sandroni	Senador Laranjeiras
Elisa Lucinda	Norma
Gustavo Machado	Suzano
Jhe Oliveira	Inácio
Joana Seibel	Gisele Laranjeiras
Juliana Knust	Fátima
Júlio Levy	Seu Veronese
Lolô de Souza Pinto	Emília Lopes de Freitas
Marcio Ehrlich	Temístocles Lopes de Freitas
Melina Damasceno	Melissa (bebê)
José Victor Castiel	Comendador Xavier Pessoa
Luciano Chirolli	Oswaldo
Maria Eduarda	Eliete
Maria Fernanda Cândido	Jeanett Dórleac
Maria Pinna	Geisa
Myriam Pérsia	madre do colégio onde Melissa estuda
Rodrigo Oiye	Jun Murakami
Rogéria	Alzira
Cassiano Gabus Mendes	Patriarca da família Vieira (aparece apenas num retrato)
Hélio Ribeiro	Sr. Conrando

== See also ==
- Lado a Lado
- Lado a Lado (soundtrack)
