= David Icke =

English conspiracy theorist (born 1952)

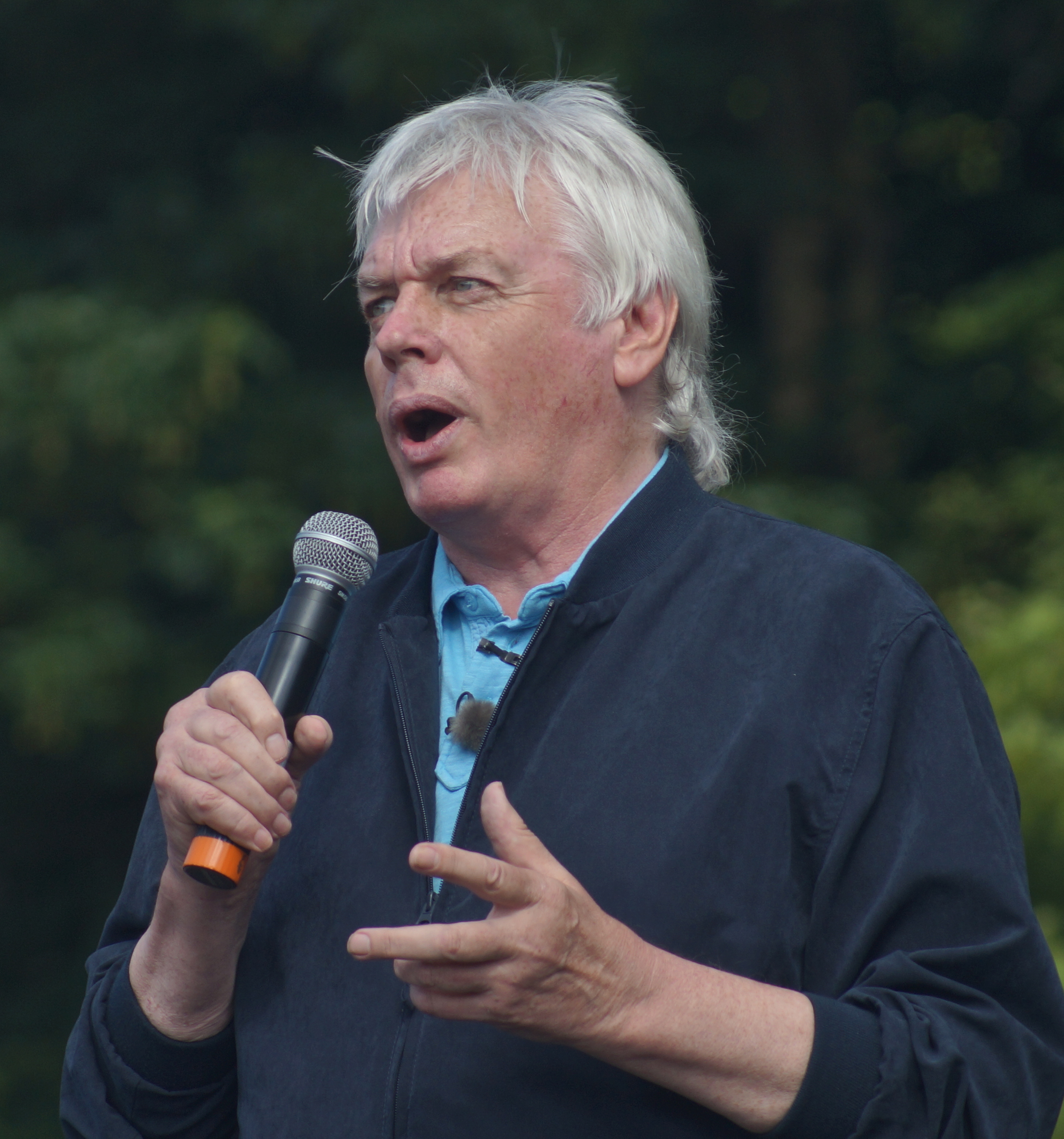
- Icke in 2013
- Born: David Vaughan Icke; 29 April 1952 (age 74); Leicester, England
- Occupations: Conspiracy theorist; writer; former sports broadcaster; football player
- Political party: Green Party (1980s–1991)
- Movement: Conspirituality
Association football career
- Position: Goalkeeper
Youth career
- 1967–1970: Coventry City
Senior career*
Years	Team	Apps	(Gls)
1970–1971	Coventry City	0	(0)
1970	→ Oxford United (loan)	0	(0)
1971	→ Northampton Town (loan)	0	(0)
1971–1973	Hereford United	37	(0)
- * Club domestic league appearances and goals
- Website: davidicke.com

David Vaughan Icke (/vɔːn ˈaɪk/ vawn EYEK; born 29 April 1952) is an English conspiracy theorist, author and a former semi-professional footballer, sports journalist and broadcaster. He has written over 20 books, self-published since the mid-1990s, and spoken in more than 25 countries.

An aspiring professional football goalkeeper in his early years, he retired aged 21 from playing due to rheumatoid arthritis. He subsequently became a sports journalist. In 1981, he became a sports broadcaster for the BBC, but his contract was terminated in 1990 over his vocal opposition to the Community Charge.

In an effort to relieve his arthritis, he began to engage with alternative medicine and New Age philosophies in the 1980s, and this encouraged his interest in Green politics. He joined the Green Party and became a national spokesperson within six months, but left the party soon after.

In 1990, Icke started visiting Betty Shine, a psychic who told him he was on Earth for a purpose and would receive messages from the spirit world. This led him to claim in 1991 to be a "Son of the Godhead" and that the world would soon be devastated by tidal waves and earthquakes. He repeated this on the BBC show Wogan. His appearance led to public ridicule. Icke wrote various books over the next 11 years which developed his world view of a New Age conspiracy. Reactions to his endorsement of an antisemitic fabrication, The Protocols of the Elders of Zion, in The Robots' Rebellion (1994) and in And the Truth Shall Set You Free (1995) led his publisher to decline further books, and he has self-published since then.

Icke contends that the universe consists of "vibrational" energy and infinite dimensions sharing the same space. He argues that there is an inter-dimensional race of reptilian beings, the Archons or Anunnaki, which have hijacked the Earth. Further, a genetically modified human–Archon hybrid race of reptilian shape-shifters – the Babylonian Brotherhood, Illuminati or "elite" – manipulate events to keep humans in fear, so that the Archons can feed off the resulting "negative energy". He claims that many public figures belong to the Babylonian Brotherhood and propel humanity towards a global fascist state or New World Order, a post-truth era ending freedom of speech. He sees the only way to defeat such "Archontic" influence is for people to wake up to the truth and fill their hearts with love.

Critics have noted antisemitic themes in Icke's statements and writings, and have described Icke as an antisemite and a Holocaust denier, due to, among other statements, his endorsement of The Protocols of the Elders of Zion, his book And the Truth Shall Set You Free, which "argues that Holocaust denial should be taught in schools," and his identification of the Jewish Rothschild family as reptilians, with his theories of reptilians being alleged to serve as a deliberate "code" for Jews, something which Icke has denied. The antisemitic themes of Icke's work and statements and his promotion of misinformation has resulted in his being banned from entering a number of countries. Icke has denied that he is an antisemite.

== Early life and education ==
The middle son of three boys, Icke was born in Leicester General Hospital to Beric Vaughan Icke and Barbara J. Cooke, who were married in Leicester in 1951. Beric Icke served in the Royal Air Force as a medical orderly during World War II, and after the war became a clerk in the Gents clock factory. The family lived in a terraced house on Lead Street in the centre of Leicester, an area that was demolished in the mid-1950s as part of the city's slum clearance.

When David Icke was aged three, around 1955, they moved to the Goodwood estate, one of the council estates the post-war Labour government built. "To say we were skint", he wrote in 1993, "is like saying it is a little chilly at the North Pole." He recalls having to hide under a window or chair when the councilman came for the rent; after knocking, the rent man would walk around the house peering through windows. His mother never explained that it was about the rent; she just told Icke to hide. He wrote in 2003 that he still gets a fright when someone knocks on the door. He attended Whitehall Infant School, and then Whitehall Junior School.

Icke has said he made no effort at school, but when he was nine he was chosen for the junior school's third-year football team. He writes that this was the first time he had succeeded at anything, and he came to see football as his way out of poverty. He played in goal, which he wrote suited the loner in him and gave him a sense of living on the edge between hero and villain.

After failing his 11-plus exam in 1963, he was sent to the city's Crown Hills Secondary Modern (rather than the local grammar school), where he was given a trial for the Leicester Boys Under-14 team.

== Career ==
=== Football ===
Icke left school at 15 after being talent-spotted by Coventry City, who signed him up in 1967 as their youth team's goalkeeper. In 1968, he played in the Coventry City youth team that were runners up to Burnley in the F.A. Youth Cup and again in their successful run in 1970. He also played for Oxford United's reserve team and Northampton Town, on loan from Coventry, in 1970 and 1971, respectively.

Rheumatoid arthritis in his left knee, which spread to the right knee, ankles, elbows, wrists and hands, stopped him from making a career out of football. Despite stating that he was often in agony during training, Icke wanted to remain playing, and was signed on a part-time contract by Hereford United player-manager John Charles, including in the first team when they were in the fourth, and later in the third, division of the English Football League.

In 1971, Icke left home following one of a number of frequent arguments he had started having with his father. His father was upset that Icke's arthritis was interfering with his football career. Icke moved into a bedsit and worked in a travel agency, travelling to Hereford twice a week in the evenings to play football.

In 1973, at the age of 21, the pain in his joints became so severe that he was forced to retire from football.

Overall, he failed to make a single senior appearance at Coventry or during his two loan spells, but did make 37 appearances for Hereford.

=== Journalism, sports broadcasting ===
The loss of Icke's position with Hereford meant that he and his wife had to sell their home, and for several weeks they lived apart, each moving in with their parents. In 1973, Icke found a job as a reporter with the weekly Leicester Advertiser, through a contact who was a sports editor at the Daily Mail. He moved on to the Leicester News Agency, did some work for BBC Radio Leicester as its football reporter, then worked his way up through the Loughborough Monitor, the Leicester Mercury and BRMB Radio in Birmingham.

In 1976, Icke worked for two months in Saudi Arabia, helping with the national football team. His position on the team was planned to be a long-term position, but Icke decided to stay in the UK after his first holiday back. After his return to the UK, BRMB decided to give him his job back, after which he successfully applied to Midlands Today at the BBC's Pebble Mill Studios in Birmingham, a job that included on-air appearances. One of the earliest stories he covered there was the murder of Carl Bridgewater, the paperboy shot during a robbery in 1978.

In 1981, Icke became a sports presenter for the BBC's national programme Newsnight, which had begun the previous year. Two years later, on 17 January 1983, he appeared on the first edition of the BBC's Breakfast Time, British television's first national breakfast show, and presented the sports news there until 1985. In 1983, he co-hosted Grandstand, at the time the BBC's flagship national sports programme. He also published his first book that year, It's a Tough Game, Son!, about how to break into football.

Icke and his family moved in 1982 to Ryde on the Isle of Wight. His relationship with Grandstand was short-lived. He wrote that a new editor arrived in 1983 who appeared not to like him, but he continued working for BBC Sport until 1990, often on bowls and snooker programmes, and at the 1988 Summer Olympics. Icke was by then a household name, but has said that a career in television began to lose its appeal to him; he found television workers insecure, shallow and sometimes vicious.

In August 1990, his contract with the BBC was terminated when he initially refused to pay the Community Charge (also known as the "poll tax"), a local tax Margaret Thatcher's government introduced that year. He ultimately paid it, but his announcement that he was willing to go to prison rather than pay prompted the BBC, by charter an impartial public-service broadcaster, to distance itself from him.

=== Green Party, Betty Shine ===
Icke began to engage with alternative medicine and New Age philosophies in the 1980s in an effort to relieve his arthritis, and this encouraged his interest in Green politics. He joined the Green Party and became a national spokesperson within six months. His second book, It Doesn't Have To Be Like This, an outline of his views on the environment, was published in 1989.

Icke wrote that 1989 was a time of considerable personal despair, and it was during this period that he said he began to feel a presence around him. He often describes how he felt it while alone in a hotel room in March 1990, and finally asked, "If there is anybody here, will you please contact me because you are driving me up the wall!" Days later, in a newsagent's shop in Ryde, he felt a force pull his feet to the ground and heard a voice guide him toward some books. One of them was Mind to Mind (1989) by Betty Shine, a psychic healer in Brighton. He read the book, then wrote to her requesting a consultation about his arthritis.

Icke visited Shine four times. During the third meeting, on 29 March 1990, Icke claims to have felt something like a spider's web on his face, and Shine told him she had a message from Wang Ye Lee of the spirit world.

Icke had been sent to heal the earth, she said, and would become famous but would face opposition. The spirit world was going to pass ideas to him, which he would speak about to others. He would write five books in three years; in 20 years a new flying machine would allow us to go wherever we wanted and time would have no meaning; and there would be earthquakes in unusual places because the inner earth was being destabilised by having oil taken from under the seabed.

In February 1991, Icke visited a pre-Inca Sillustani burial ground near Puno, Peru, where he felt drawn to a particular circle of waist-high stones. As he stood in the circle, he had two thoughts: that people would be talking about this in 100 years, and that it would be over when it rained. His body shook as though plugged into an electrical socket, he wrote, and new ideas poured into him. Then it started raining and the experience ended. He described it as the kundalini (a term from Hindu yoga) activating his chakras, or energy centres, triggering a higher level of consciousness.

=== Turquoise period ===
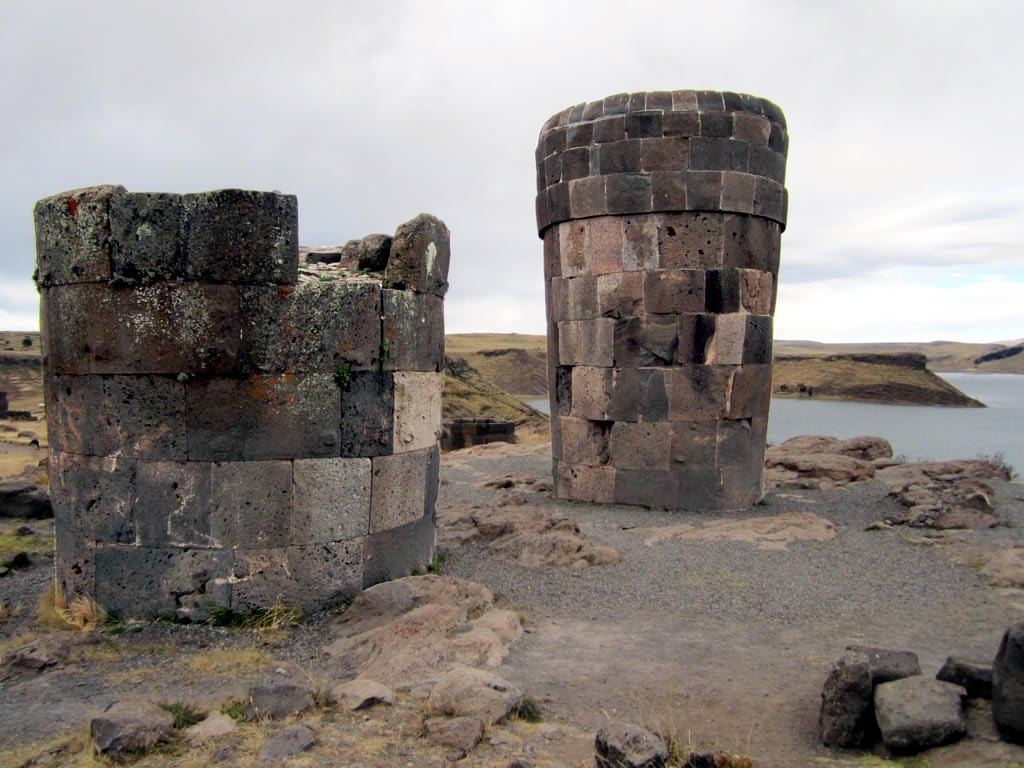
Icke's turquoise period followed an experience by a burial site in Sillustani, Peru, in 1991.

There followed what Icke called his "turquoise period". He had been channelling for some time, he wrote, and had received a message through automatic writing that he was a "Son of the Godhead", interpreting "Godhead" as the "Infinite Mind". He began to wear only the colour turquoise, often a turquoise shell suit, a colour he saw as a conduit for positive energy. He also started working on his third book, and the first of his New-Age period, The Truth Vibrations.

In August 1990, before his visit to Peru, Icke met Deborah Shaw, an English psychic based in Calgary, Alberta, Canada. When he returned from Peru, they began a relationship, with the apparent blessing of Icke's wife. In March 1991, Shaw began living with the couple, a short-lived arrangement that the press called the "turquoise triangle". Shaw changed her name to Mari Shawsun, while Icke's wife became Michaela, which she said was an aspect of the Archangel Michael.

The relationship with Shaw led to the birth of a daughter in December 1991, although she and Icke had by then ceased their relationship. Icke wrote in 1993 that at Shaw's request he decided not to visit their daughter and had seen her only once. Icke's wife gave birth to the couple's second son in November 1992.

==== Green Party resignation and press conference ====
In March 1991, Icke resigned from the Green Party during a party conference, telling them he was about to be at the centre of "tremendous and increasing controversy", and winning a standing ovation from delegates after the announcement.

A week later, shortly after his father died, Icke and his wife, Linda Atherton, along with their daughter and Deborah Shaw, held a press conference to announce that Icke was a son of the Godhead. He told reporters the world was going to end in 1997. It would be preceded by a hurricane around the Gulf of Mexico and New Orleans, eruptions in Cuba, disruption in China, a hurricane in Derry, and an earthquake on the Isle of Arran. The information was being given to them by voices and automatic writing, he said. Los Angeles would become an island, New Zealand would disappear, and the cliffs of Kent would be underwater by Christmas.

==== Wogan interview ====
There was controversy in the tabloid press about Icke's declaration that he was the 'son of God', an assertion that was taken as a claim that he was Jesus. News headlines following Icke's press conference attracted requests for interviews from Nicky Campbell's BBC Radio One programme, for Terry Wogan's prime-time Wogan show, and Fern Britton's ITV chat show.

Wogan introduced the 1991 segment with "The world as we know it is about to end". The tabloid press had been running with the story that Icke was claiming to be the Son of God. When Wogan incredulously asked Icke, "Why you? Why have you been chosen?", he replied that Jesus would have been laughed at too, and repeated that Britain would soon be devastated by tidal waves and earthquakes. Without these, "the Earth will cease to exist". Amid laughter from the audience, Icke said laughter was the best way to remove negativity. Wogan replied of the audience: "But they're laughing at you. They're not laughing with you." The BBC was criticised for allowing it to go ahead; Des Christy of The Guardian called it a "media crucifixion".

The interview led to a difficult period for Icke. In May 1991, police were called to the couple's home after a crowd of over 100 youths gathered outside, chanting "We want the Messiah" and "Give us a sign, David". Icke told Jon Ronson in 2001:

One of my very greatest fears as a child was being ridiculed in public. And there it was coming true. As a television presenter, I'd been respected. People come up to you in the street and shake your hand and talk to you in a respectful way. And suddenly, overnight, this was transformed into "Icke's a nutter." I couldn't walk down any street in Britain without being laughed at. It was a nightmare. My children were devastated because their dad was a figure of ridicule.

In 2006, Wogan interviewed Icke again for a special Wogan Now & Then series where he spoke about his concerns about the think-tank Project for the New American Century. Wogan was apologetic for his conduct in the 1991 interview.

=== Writing and lecturing ===
==== Early books ====
The Wogan interview separated Icke from his previous life, he wrote in 2003, although he considered it the making of him in the end, giving him the courage to develop his ideas without caring what anyone thought. His book The Truth Vibrations, inspired by his experience in Peru, was published in 1991.

Between 1992 and 1994, he wrote five books, all published by mainstream publishers, four in 1993. Love Changes Everything (1992), influenced by the "channelling" work of Deborah Shaw, is a theosophical work about the origin of the planet, in which Icke writes with admiration about Jesus. Days of Decision (1993) is an 86-page summary of his interviews after the 1991 press conference; it questions the historicity of Jesus but accepts the existence of the Christ spirit. Icke's autobiography, In the Light of Experience, was published the same year, followed by Heal the World: A Do-It-Yourself Guide to Personal and Planetary Transformation (1993).

===== The Robots' Rebellion =====
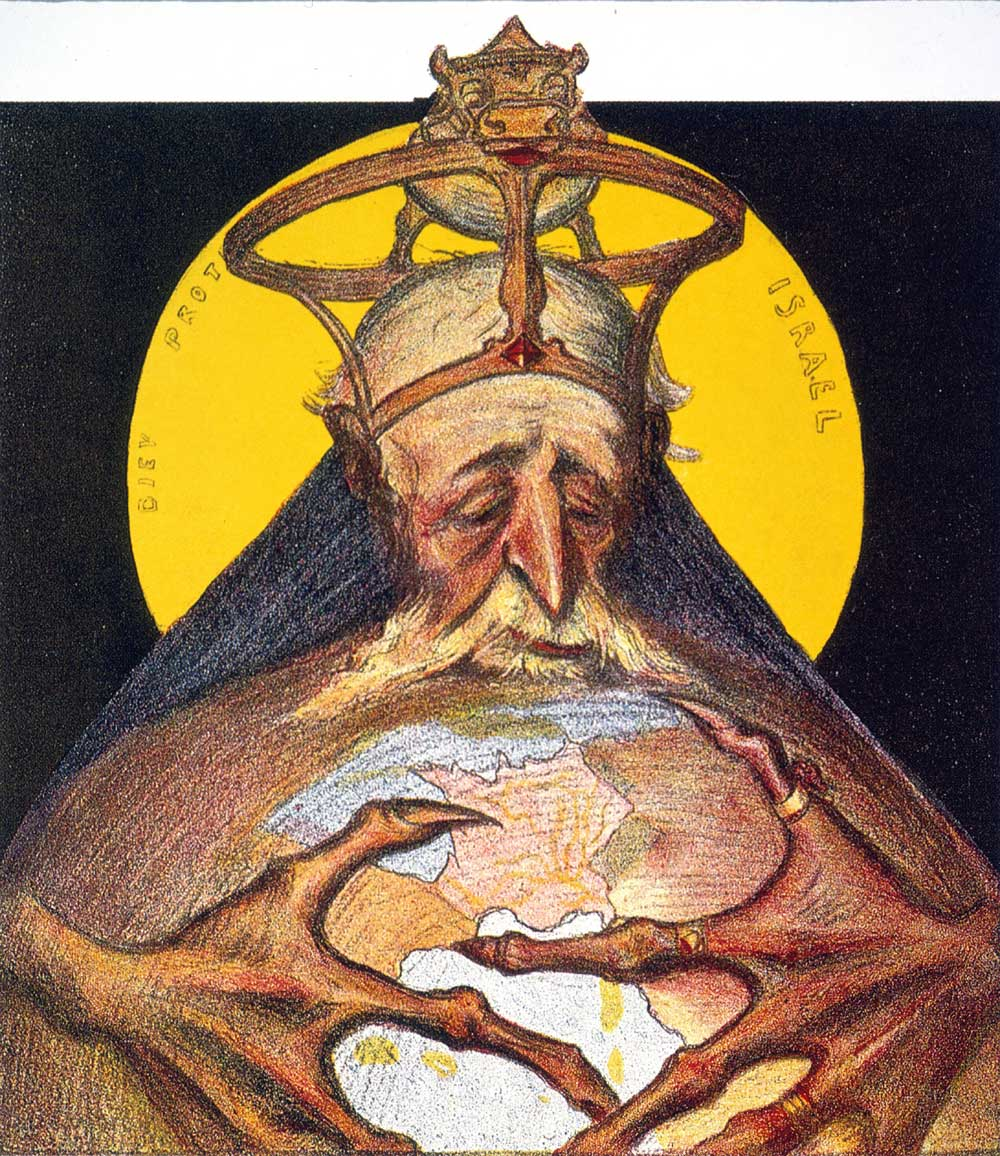
In his 2001 documentary about Icke, Jon Ronson cited this cartoon, "Rothschild" (1898), by Charles Léandre, arguing that Jews have long been depicted as lizard-like creatures who are out to control the world.

Icke's The Robots' Rebellion (1994), a book published by Gateway, attracted allegations that his work was antisemitic. According to historian Nicholas Goodrick-Clarke, the book contains "all the familiar beliefs and paranoid clichés" of the US conspiracists and militia. It claims that a plan for world domination by a shadowy cabal, perhaps extraterrestrial, was laid out in The Protocols of the Elders of Zion (c. 1897).

The Protocols of the Elders of Zion is an antisemitic literary forgery, probably written under the direction of the Russian secret police in Paris, purporting to reveal a conspiracy by the Jewish people to achieve global domination. It was exposed as a forgery in 1920 by Lucien Wolf and the following year by Philip Graves in The Times. Once exposed, it disappeared from mainstream discourse until interest in it was renewed by the American far right in the 1950s. Interest in it was further spread by conspiracy groups on the Internet. According to Michael Barkun, Icke's reliance on the Protocols in The Robots' Rebellion is "the first of a number of instances in which Icke moves into the dangerous terrain of antisemitism".

Icke took both the extraterrestrial angle and the focus on the Protocols from Behold a Pale Horse (1991) by Milton William Cooper, who was associated with the American militia movement; chapter 15 of Cooper's book reproduces the Protocols in full. The Robots' Rebellion refers repeatedly to the Protocols, calling them the Illuminati protocols, and defining Illuminati as the "Brotherhood elite at the top of the pyramid of secret societies world-wide". Icke adds that the Protocols were not the work of the Jewish people, but of Zionists.

The Robots' Rebellion was greeted with dismay by the Green Party's executive. Despite the controversy over the press conference and the Wogan interview, they had allowed Icke to address the party's annual conference in 1992 – a decision that led one of its principal speakers, Sara Parkin, to resign – but after the publication of The Robots' Rebellion they moved to ban him. Icke wrote to The Guardian in September 1994 denying that The Robots' Rebellion was antisemitic, and rejecting racism, sexism and prejudice of any kind, while insisting that whoever had written the Protocols "knew the game plan" for the twentieth century.

==== Self-publishing ====
Why do we play a part in suppressing alternative information to the official line of the Second World War? How is it right that while this fierce suppression goes on, free copies of the Spielberg film, Schindler's List, are given to schools to indoctrinate children with the unchallenged version of events. And why do we, who say we oppose tyranny and demand freedom of speech, allow people to go to prison and be vilified, and magazines to be closed down on the spot, for suggesting another version of history.

— And the Truth Shall Set You Free (1995)

Icke's next manuscript, And the Truth Shall Set You Free (1995), contained a chapter questioning aspects of the Holocaust, which caused a rift with his publisher, Gateway. In the book, Icke suggested that Jews funded the Holocaust by quoting and seconding Gary Allen's claim that "The Warburgs, part of the Rothschild empire, helped finance Adolf Hitler". In his view, schools "indoctrinate children with the unchallenged version of events" with the mainstream account of the Holocaust thanks to their use of free copies of the film Schindler's List (1993). The book "argues that Holocaust denial should be taught in schools." After borrowing £15,000 from a friend, Icke established Bridge of Love Publications, later called David Icke Books. He self-published And the Truth Shall Set You Free and all his subsequent books.

According to Lewis and Kahn, Icke aimed to consolidate all conspiracy theories into one project with unlimited explanatory power. His books sold 140,000 copies between 1998 and 2011, at a value of over £2 million. Thirty thousand copies of The Biggest Secret (1999) were in print months after publication, according to Icke, and it was reprinted six times between 1999 and 2006. His 2002 book Alice in Wonderland and the World Trade Center Disaster became a long-standing top-five bestseller in South Africa. By 2006, his website was gaining 600,000 hits a week, and by 2011, his books had been translated into 11 languages.

==== Lecturing ====
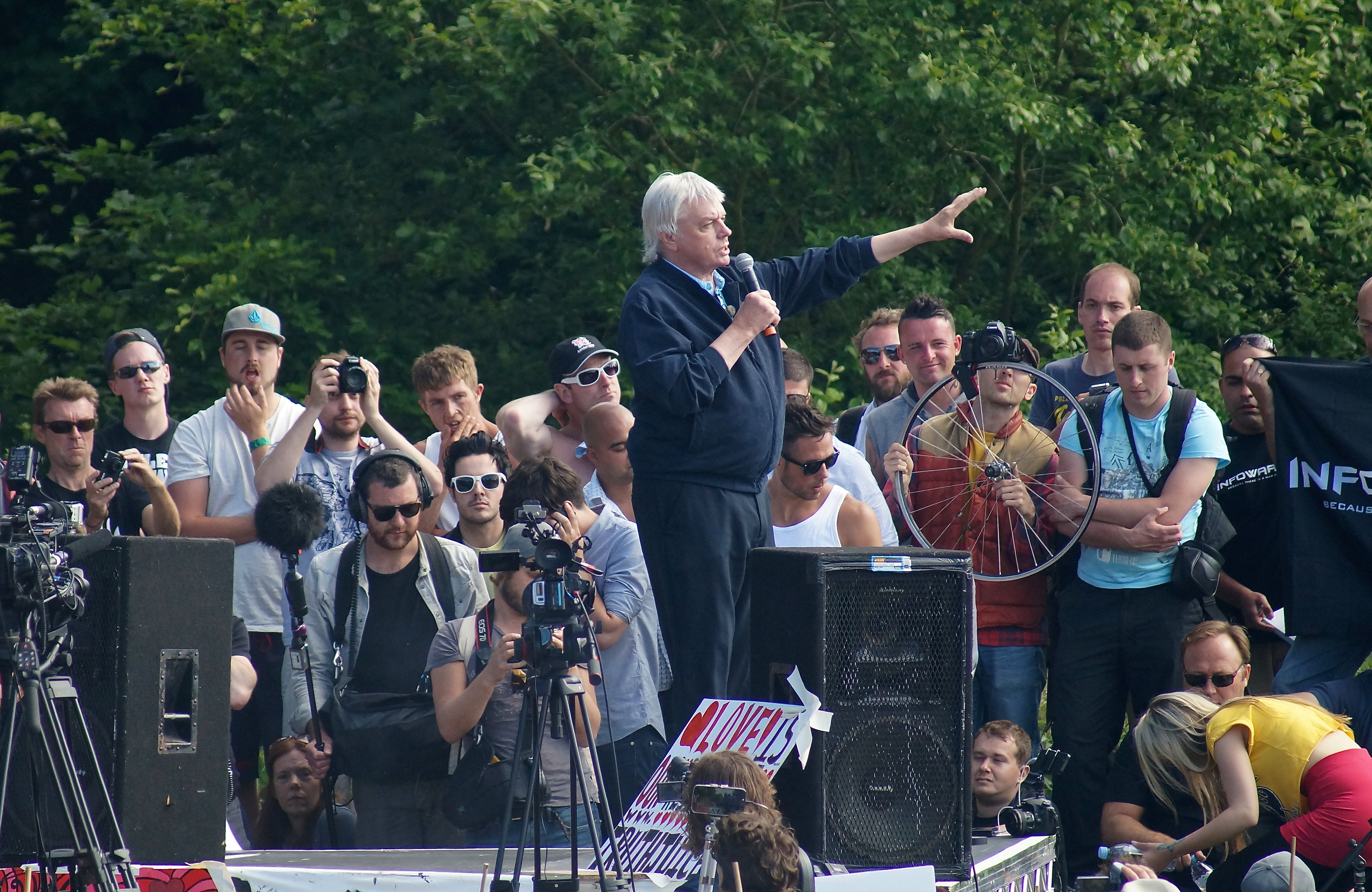
Icke speaking in June 2013

Icke has held public lectures around the world, and by 2006, had spoken in at least 25 countries. He spoke for seven hours to 2,500 people at the Brixton Academy, London, in 2008, and the same year addressed the University of Oxford's debating society, the Oxford Union. His book tour for Human Race Get Off Your Knees: The Lion Sleeps No More (2010) included a sold-out talk to 2,100 in New York City and £83,000 worth of ticket sales in Melbourne. In October 2012, he spoke for eleven hours to 6,000 people at London's Wembley Arena. Icke's lecturing "combines sophisticated slideshows, which use image and sound more than text, with his own personally impassioned on-stage presence", with Icke often working in content that is specific to the country he is lecturing in, such as local politics, to better engage with his audience. These lectures primarily focus on promulgating his conspiracist worldview, but generally "concludes them with New Age exhortations for spiritual growth as a positive means of challenging and changing the conspiracy".

==== Politics and television ====
Icke stood for parliament in the 2008 by-election for Haltemprice and Howden (a constituency in the East Riding of Yorkshire), on the issue of "Big Brother – The Big Picture". He came 12th out of 26 candidates, with 110 votes (0.46%), resulting in a lost deposit. He explained that he was standing because "if we don't face this now we are going to have some serious explaining to do when we are asked by our children and grandchildren what we were doing when the global fascist state was installed. 'I was watching EastEnders, dear' will not be good enough."

In November 2013, Icke launched an Internet television station, The People's Voice, broadcast from London. He founded the station after crowdsourcing over £300,000 and worked for it as a volunteer until March 2014. Later that year, the station stopped broadcasting.

== Personal life ==
Icke met his first wife, Linda Atherton, in May 1971 at a dance at the Chesford Grange Hotel near Leamington Spa, Warwickshire. They married on 30 September 1971, four months after they met. Their daughter Kerry was born in March 1975; Kerry died in December 2023. Their first son, Gareth, was born in December 1981, followed by their second son, Jaymie, in November 1992.

In March 1991, English-Canadian psychic Deborah Shaw began living with the couple in a short-lived arrangement. The relationship with Shaw led to the birth of a daughter in December 1991, although Shaw and Icke had by then ceased their relationship. Icke wrote in 1993 that at Shaw's request he decided not to visit their daughter and had seen her only once.

Icke and Atherton divorced in 2001 but remained friends, and Atherton continued to work as Icke's business manager.

In 1997, he met his second wife, Pamela Leigh Richards, in Jamaica. He and Richards were married in 2001 following his divorce from Atherton. They separated in 2008 and divorced in 2011.

Icke has lived since 1982 on the Isle of Wight.

== Conspiracy theories ==
Icke combines New Age philosophical concepts about the universe and consciousness with conspiracy theories about public figures being reptilian humanoids and paedophiles. He argues in favour of reincarnation; a collective consciousness that has intentionality; modal realism (that other possible worlds exist alongside the observed world); and the so-called law of attraction (that good and bad thought can attract experiences).

In The Biggest Secret (1999), he introduced the idea that many prominent figures derive from the Anunnaki, a reptilian race from the Draco constellation. In Human Race Get Off Your Knees: The Lion Sleeps No More (2012), he identified the Moon (and later Saturn) as the source of holographic experiences, broadcast by the reptiles, that humanity interprets as reality.

Icke is an opponent of the scientific method, describing it as "bollocks" in 2013. When asked by The Sunday Times to explain the existence of television, he said, "It's not that all science is bollocks," but rather "[t]he basis of the way science judges reality is bollocks." He also engages in climate change denial.

=== Infinite dimensions ===
Icke believes the universe consists of "vibrational" energy and infinite dimensions sharing the same space, similar to radio frequencies, allowing some individuals to attune their consciousness to different wavelengths. He stated in an interview with The Guardian that:

Our five senses can access only a tiny frequency range, like a radio tuned to one station. In the space you are occupying now are all the radio and television stations broadcasting to your area. You can't see them and they can't see each other because they are on different wavelengths. But move your radio dial and suddenly there they are, one after the other. It is the same with the reality we experience here as "life". What we call the "world" and the "universe" is only one frequency range in an infinite number sharing the same space.

Icke believes that time is an illusion, asserting that there is no past or future—only the "infinite now" is real. He views humans as an aspect of consciousness, or infinite awareness, which he describes as encompassing "all that there is, has been, and ever can be."

=== Reptoid humanoids ===
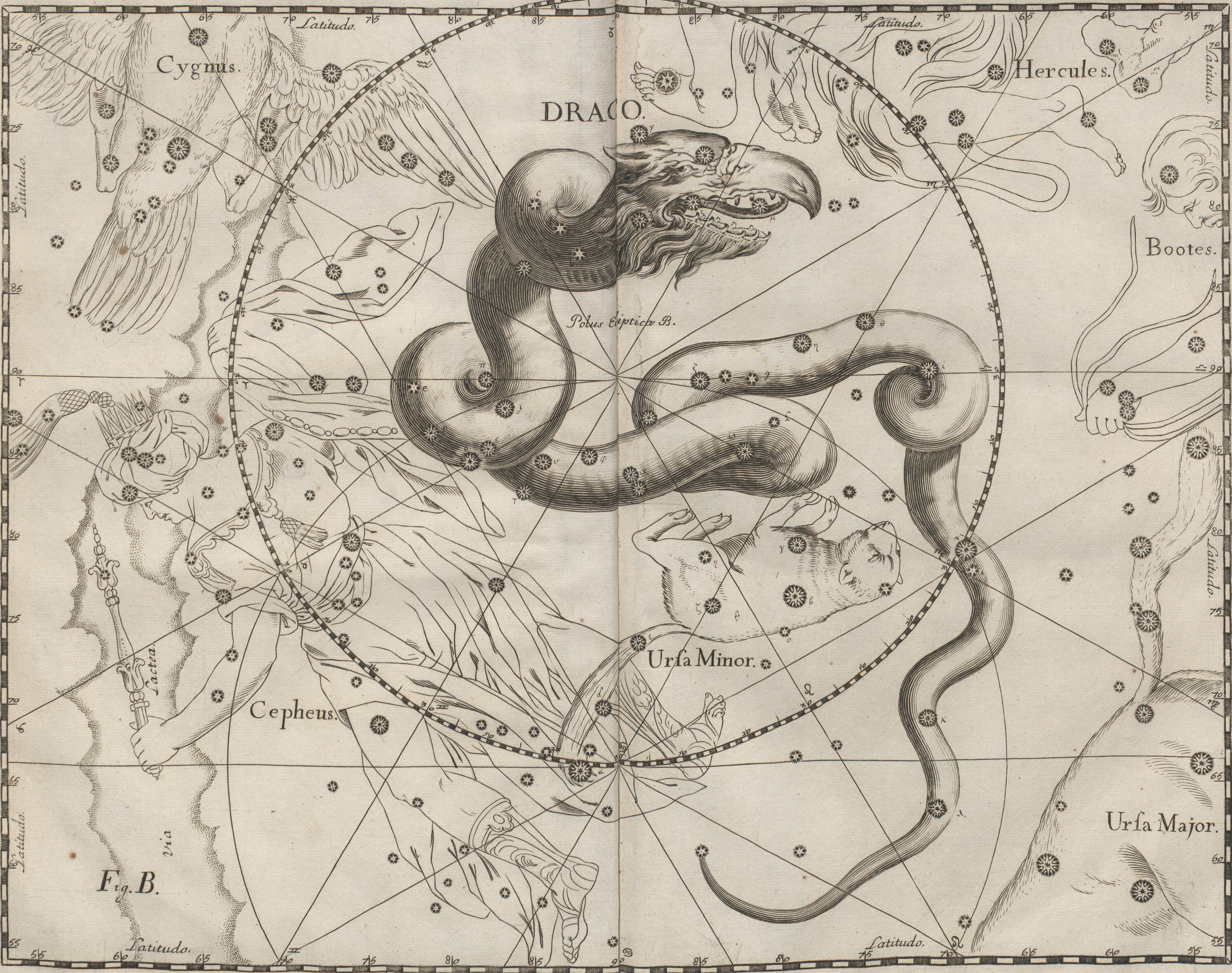
The Draco constellation from Firmamentum Sobiescianum sive Uranographia (1690) by Johannes Hevelius. Icke's "reptoid hypothesis" posits that humanity is ruled by descendants of reptilians from Draco.

Icke believes that an inter-dimensional race of reptilian beings called the Archons have hijacked the earth and are stopping humanity from realising its true potential. He claims they are the same beings as the Anunnaki—deities from the Babylonian creation myth Enûma Eliš—and fallen angels—Watchers—who mated with human women in the Biblical apocrypha.

He believes that a genetically modified human/Archon hybrid race of shape-shifting reptilians, known as the "Babylonian Brotherhood" or the Illuminati, manipulate global events to keep humans in constant fear so that the Archons can feed off the "negative energy" this creates. In The Biggest Secret, Icke identified the Brotherhood as descendants of reptilians from the constellation Draco and said they live in caverns inside the earth.

Icke said in an interview:

When you get back into the ancient world, you find this recurring theme of a union between a non-human race and humans – creating a hybrid race.
From 1998, I started coming across people who told me they had seen people change into a non-human form. It's an age-old phenomenon known as shape-shifting. The basic form is like a scaly humanoid, with reptilian rather than humanoid eyes.

Icke claims the first reptilian-human breeding programmes took place 200,000–300,000 years ago (perhaps creating the biblical Adam), and the third (and latest) occurred 7,000 years ago. He claims that the hybrids of the third programme, being more Anunnaki than human, currently control the world. He writes in The Biggest Secret, "The Brotherhood which controls the world today is the modern expression of the Babylonian Brotherhood of reptile-Aryan priests and 'royalty'". Icke states that they came together in Sumer after "the flood" but originated in the Caucasus. He explains that when he uses the term "Aryan," he means "the white race."

Icke has stated that the reptilians come from not only another planet but another dimension: the lower level of the fourth dimension (the "lower astral dimension")—the one nearest the physical world. From this dimension, they control the planet, although just as fourth-dimensional reptilians control us, they, in turn, are controlled by a fifth dimension. Michael Barkun argues that Icke's introduction of different dimensions allowed him to skip awkward questions about how the reptilians got here. Icke believes the only way this "Archontic" influence can be defeated is if people wake up to "the truth" and fill their hearts with love.

Icke briefly introduced his ideas about ancient astronauts in The Robot's Rebellion (1994), citing Milton William Cooper's Behold a Pale Horse (1991), and expanded it in And the Truth Shall Set You Free (1995), citing Barbara Marciniak's Bringers of the Dawn (1992).

Religious studies lecturer David G. Robertson writes that Icke's reptilian idea is adapted from Zecharia Sitchin's The 12th Planet (1976), combined with material from Credo Mutwa, a Zulu healer. Sitchin suggested that the Anunnaki came to Earth for its precious metals. Icke has said that they came for what he refers to as "mono-atomic gold", which he claims can increase the capacity of the nervous system ten-thousandfold and that after ingesting it, the Anunnaki can process vast amounts of information, speed up trans-dimensional travel, and shapeshift from reptilian to human. Lewis and Kahn argue that Icke is using allegory to depict the alienating nature of global capitalism. Icke has said he is not using allegory.

As of 2003, Icke claimed the reptilian bloodline includes all (then 43) American presidents, three British and two Canadian prime ministers, several Sumerian kings and Egyptian pharaohs, and a smattering of celebrities. Key bloodlines are said to include the Rockefellers, Rothschilds, various European aristocratic families, the establishment families of the Eastern United States, and the British House of Windsor. Icke claimed he saw British prime minister Edward Heath's eyes turn entirely "jet black" while the two men waited for a Sky News interview in 1989. He confirmed to Andrew Neil in May 2016 that he believes the British royal family are shape-shifting lizards. In 2001, Icke said Queen Elizabeth The Queen Mother was "seriously reptilian". The Rothschilds, in Icke's opinion, are also blood-drinking Satan-worshipers, which Daniel Allington and David Toube argued in 2018 was part of a revival of medieval antisemitism.

Icke sometimes calls the reptilian plot the "unseen". After a 2018 talk by Icke in Southport, Merseyside, Michael Marshall reported:

The appearance of the 'unseen' in the Middle East 6,000 years ago seems to be no coincidence, and it's little wonder that Icke's work is so often accused of anti-Semitism. However, if we were to accept that Icke himself does not hold such views, and that his work is merely co-opted by groups who undeniably are anti-Semitic, we also have to acknowledge that Icke often does his case no favours.

Critics view Icke's "reptilians" and other theories as antisemitic and accuse him of Holocaust denial. Critics say that Icke's reptilians are symbolic representations of Jews, which Icke called "total friggin' nonsense", adding, "this is not a plot on the world by Jewish people".

=== Brotherhood aims and institutions ===
Icke states that at the apex of the Babylonian Brotherhood stand the "Global Elite", and at the top of the Global Elite are what Icke has referred to as the "Prison Wardens". Icke claims the brotherhood's goal, or their "Great Work of Ages", is a microchipped population, a world government, and a global Orwellian fascist state or New World Order, which he claims will be a post-truth era in which freedom of speech is ended.

Icke believes that the brotherhood uses human anxiety as energy and that the Archons keep humanity trapped in a "five-sense reality" so they can feed off the negative energy created by fear and hate. In 1999, he wrote, "Thus we have the encouragement of wars, human genocide, the mass slaughter of animals, sexual perversions which create highly charged negative energy, and black magic ritual and sacrifice which takes place on a scale that will stagger those who have not studied the subject." Icke proposes that human sacrifice "to the gods" in the ancient world was for the reptilians' benefit, especially sacrifice of children, because "at the moment of death by sacrifice a form of adrenaline surges through the body, accumulating at the base of the brain, and is apparently more potent in children", claiming "this is what the reptilians and their crossbreeds want". He suggests that these sacrifices continue to this day. He also claims the reptilians and their hybrid bloodlines engage in paedophilia and cannibalism.

It is claimed that the brotherhood either created or controls the United Nations, International Monetary Fund, Round Table, Council on Foreign Relations, Chatham House, Club of Rome, Trilateral Commission and Bilderberg Group, as well as the media, military, CIA, MI6, Mossad, science, religion, and the Internet, with witting or unwitting support from the London School of Economics. In an interview in February 2019, Icke was asked about his beliefs and replied, "They're very clever in their systems of manipulation, which is overwhelmingly psychological manipulation, because if you can manipulate perceptions to believe that Osama bin Laden was behind 9/11, then you'll get support to invade Afghanistan".

=== Problem–reaction–solution ===
Icke uses the phrase "problem–reaction–solution" to explain how he believes the Illuminati agenda advances. According to Icke, the Illuminati guide us in the direction they desire by creating false problems, which allows them to give their desired solution to the problem they created. He also refers to this process as "order out of chaos". In 2018, researchers looking at the psychological effects of Icke's belief system argued that "problem–reaction–solution" resembles the misinterpretation of the Hegelian thesis, antithesis, synthesis triad popularized by Chalybäus.

Incidents and issues Icke attributes to the Illuminati, or "Global Elite", include the Oklahoma City bombing, Dunblane, Columbine, 9/11 (which Icke believes was an "inside job" to provide an excuse to advance an agenda of regime change across the world), 7/7, global warming, chemtrails, water fluoridation, the death of Diana, Princess of Wales, the assassination of John F. Kennedy and Agenda 21. These incidents allow them to respond in whatever way they intended to act in the first place.

One of the methods Icke claims they use is creating fake opposites, or what he calls "opposames", such as the Axis and Allied powers of World War II, which he believes were used to provoke the creation of the European Union and the state of Israel. Icke argues that they have to control both sides to ensure the outcome they want. He believes that US presidents George W. Bush, Barack Obama and Donald Trump are part of a false political divide. Despite the presidency belonging to the Republican Party, then the Democratic Party, and then going back to the Republicans, Icke claims they are all pushing the same agenda of regime change in the Middle East, a goal set out in the early 2000s in a document called The Project for the New American Century. Icke claims that this dialectic allows the Illuminati to gradually move societies toward totalitarianism without challenge, a process he calls the "totalitarian tiptoe".

In Tales From The Time Loop (2003), Icke argues that the Illuminati create religious, racial, ethnic, and sexual division to divide and rule humanity but believes that the many can only be controlled by the few if they allow themselves to be and that the power the Illuminati have is the power the people give them. "Divide and rule is the bottom line of all dictatorships... Arab is turned against Jew, black against white, Right against Left. Unplugging from the Matrix means refusing to recognise these illusory fault lines. We are all One. I refuse to see a Jew as different from an Arab and vice versa. They are both expressions of the One and need to be observed and treated the same, none more or less important than the other. I refuse to see black people in terms that I would not see white, nor to see the 'Left' as I would not see the 'Right'. How could it be any different, except when we believe the illusion of division is real? If we do that, the Matrix has us."

Icke's solution is peaceful non-compliance, which he believes will disempower "the elite".

=== Saturn–Moon Matrix ===
The Moon Matrix is introduced in Human Race Get Off Your Knees: The Lion Sleeps No More (2010), in which Icke suggests that the Earth and the collective human mind are manipulated from the Moon, a spacecraft and inter-dimensional portal the reptilians control. The Moon Matrix is a broadcast from that spacecraft to the human body–computer, specifically to the left hemisphere of the brain, which gives us our sense of reality: "We are living in a dreamworld within a dreamworld – a Matrix within the virtual-reality universe – and it is being broadcast from the Moon. Unless people force themselves to become fully conscious, their minds are the Moon's mind." Will Storr, writing for The Sunday Times in 2013, ponders if Icke's ideas suddenly "pop" into his head. On page 299 of Human Race Get Off Your Knees, Icke writes about working at his computer on the book and having "the overwhelming feeling out of 'nowhere' that the moon was not 'real'. By 'real' I mean not a 'heavenly body', but an artificial construct (or hollowed-out planetoid) that has been put there to control life on Earth — which it does. I have pondered this possibility a few times over the years, but this time I just 'knew'. It was like an enormous penny had suddenly dropped".

This idea is further explored in Icke's Remember Who You Are: Remember 'Where' You Are and Where You 'Come' From (2012), where he introduces the concept of the "Saturn–Moon Matrix". In this more recent conceptualization, the rings of Saturn (which Icke believes were artificially created by reptilian spacecraft) are the ultimate signal source, while the Moon functions as an amplifier. He claims that frequencies broadcast from the hexagonal storm on Saturn are amplified through the hollow structure of our artificial moon keeping humanity trapped in a holographic projection.

=== 5G and COVID-19 ===
David Icke has been identified by the Center for Countering Digital Hate as a leading producer of misinformation about COVID-19 as well as anti-Semitic content. In April 2020, Icke claimed in a YouTube video on Brian Rose's London Real channel that there was a link between the COVID-19 pandemic and 5G mobile phone networks. The video was removed from the platform, and YouTube tightened its rules to prevent its website being used to spread conspiracy theories about the COVID-19 pandemic. It was later also deleted from Facebook. Multiple mobile phone masts were subject to arson attacks at this time, as well as telecom engineers being abused. Nick Cohen in The Observer thought Icke was ambiguous as to whether the phone masts should be left alone. In the London Real interview, Icke said: "If 5G continues and reaches where they want to take it, human life as we know it is over... so people have to make a decision."

London Live screened a similar interview with Icke about the coronavirus on 8 April 2020. He made an unsupported claim that Israel was using the crisis "to test its technology" and suggested any attempt to require people to be vaccinated against COVID-19 amounted to "fascism".

After Ofcom's formal investigation, the UK media regulator decided the 80-minute interview broke the terms of the broadcasting code as it "expressed views which had the potential to cause significant harm to viewers in London during the pandemic" which "were made without the support of any scientific or other evidence."

Icke's main page on Facebook was deleted on 1 May 2020, while other pages promoting Icke with a smaller readership remained on the platform. Facebook said it had removed Icke's page for its "health misinformation that could cause physical harm". His YouTube channel was deleted a day later. A spokeswoman for YouTube told BBC News: "YouTube has clear policies prohibiting any content that disputes the existence and transmission of COVID-19 as described by the WHO and the NHS. Due to continued violation of these policies, we have terminated David Icke's YouTube channel." Icke's appearances in videos uploaded by other users were only to be removed if their content breached the same rules.

On 29 August 2020, Icke spoke at an anti-lockdown protest in Trafalgar Square, London, organised under the Unite for Freedom banner. During his speech, he stated, "Anyone with a half a brain cell on active duty can see coronavirus is nonsense" and, "We have a virus so intelligent that it only infects those taking part in protests the government wants to stop". He also stated, "This world is controlled by a tiny few people" who "impose their agenda on billions of people". He told the police who were present at the rally that they were "enforcing fascism that your own children will have to live with" and urged them to "join us and stop serving the psychopaths".

In early November 2020, Twitter permanently suspended Icke's account on the platform for having violated its rules regarding COVID-19 misinformation.

== Reception ==
Interest in Icke's conspiracy theories is widespread and has cut across political, economic, and religious divides. His audiences hold a wide range of beliefs, uniting individuals, and left and right wing groups; from New Agers, and Ufologists, as well as the far-right Christian Patriot movement, and the neo-Nazi group Combat 18, which supports his writings. Icke has been considered an exemplar of the conspirituality trend of the merging of New Age and conspiracist worldviews. Icke's work is representative of a major global countercultural trend. American novelist Alice Walker is an admirer of Icke's writings, along with comedian Russell Brand, and musician Mick Fleetwood. Icke has emerged as a professional conspiracy theorist within a global counter-cultural movement that combines New World Order conspiracism, the truther movement and anti-globalisation, with an extraterrestrial conspiracist subculture.

=== Accusations of antisemitism ===
There is a strong strain of anti-Semitic conspiracy theorizing that makes ufological connections, including especially the work of Milton William Cooper (1991) and David Icke (e.g., 1997). Both are controversial but still well known in both right-wing conspiracist and ufological subcultures.

— Christopher F. Roth, Ufology as Anthropology: Race, Extraterrestrials, and the Occult

Icke has repeatedly denied that he is an antisemite. In 2001, when he was questioned by Jon Ronson, Icke declared that The Protocols of the Elders of Zion is evidence not of a Jewish plot but of a reptilian plot. He also said, "the families in positions of great financial power obsessively interbreed with each other. But I'm not talking about one earth race, Jewish or non-Jewish. I'm talking about a genetic network that operates through all races, this bloodline being a fusion of human and reptilian genes... let me make myself clear: this does not in any way relate to an earth race." In an article in The Algemeiner, the writer commented: "Yet when he goes through a list of people in power who he considers to be 'Rothschild Zionists,' they all happen to be Jews (with many of them never claiming to be Zionists at all.)" According to Mark Gardner of the Community Security Trust, Icke believes a "'Rothschild Zionist' conspiracy controls the world, driving global conflict through NATO and seeking World War Three, which will begin between Zionists and Muslims." Such claims about the Rothschilds have a long history as an antisemitic theme. Jonathan A. Greenblatt, chief executive of the Anti-Defamation League told The New York Times in December 2018: "There is no fair reading of Icke's work that could be seen as not anti-Semitic".

Icke states in And the Truth Shall Set you Free (1996):

Why do we play a part in suppressing alternative information to the official line of the Second World War? How is it right that while this fierce suppression goes on, free copies of the Spielberg film, Schindler's List, are given to schools to indoctrinate children with the unchallenged version of events. And why do we, who say we oppose tyranny and demand freedom of speech, allow people to go to prison and be vilified, and magazines to be closed down on the spot, for suggesting another version of history.

Icke claims that the antisemitic forgery The Protocols of the Elders of Zion is genuine, explaining in And the Truth Shall Set you Free:

I strongly believe that a small Jewish clique which has contempt for the mass of Jewish people worked with non-Jews to create the First World War, the Russian Revolution, and the Second World War... They then dominated the Versailles Peace Conference and created the circumstances which made the Second World War inevitable. They financed Hitler to power in 1933 and made the funds available for his rearmament.

In the book, Yair Rosenberg reports, Icke uses the words "Jewish" on 241 occasions, and "Rothschild" on 374 occasions. Icke claims that Jews themselves are to blame for antisemitism:

Thought patterns in the collective Jewish mind have repeatedly created that physical reality of oppression, prejudice and racism which matches the pattern – the expectation – programmed into their collective psyche. They expect it; they create it.

In The Trigger: The Lie That Changed the World – Who Really Did It and Why (2019), Icke writes that the official explanation for the September 11 attacks is false and is intended to cover up the "massive and central involvement in 9/11 by the Israeli government, [Israeli] military and [Israeli] intelligence operatives." He states in the book: "Zionist and ultra-Zionist organisations form a network across America and the world to manipulate and impose the will of ultra-Zionism and the Sabbatian-Frankist Death Cult....Add the Kosher Nostra networks of organized crime which interlock with Mossad....add control of so much of government and media—and you have a hidden stream of interconnections perfectly capable of perpetrating and then covering up 9/11." In February 2026, Icke claimed on his blog that American financier and child sex offender Jeffrey Epstein was running a "Mossad/CIA blackmail operation," echoing an antisemitic trope previously espoused by right-wing political commentators Tucker Carlson and Candace Owens.

In his book UFOs, Conspiracy Theories and the New Age, David G. Robertson disputes that Icke is antisemitic, saying that it is just easier for some people to accept that when Icke says reptilians he really means Jews than that he literally means extraterrestrial reptilians control world politics. Robertson also says that to believe the accusations of antisemitism you must ignore numerous things, such as the many high-profile people Icke names as reptilian who are not Jewish (a point also made by Jon Ronson in his 2001 documentary The Secret Rulers of the World, Part 2: "David Icke, The Lizards and The Jews"), Icke's frequent statements that he is speaking literally and not metaphorically, and that Icke identifies the supposedly reptilian ruling elite as "Aryan" in several places. Robertson also writes that Icke denounces racism, having called it "the ultimate idiocy". In 2018, in response to allegations of antisemitism, Icke stated to Vox that: "My philosophy and view of life is that we are all points of attention within the same state of Infinite Awareness and the labels we are given and give ourselves are merely temporary experiences and not who we are... Thus to me all racism is ridiculous and completely missing the point of who we are and where we are."

Following complaints from the Canadian Jewish Congress in 2000, Icke was briefly detained by immigration officials in Canada, where he was booked for a speaking tour, and his books were removed from Indigo Books, a Canadian chain. Several stops on the tour were cancelled by their venues, as was a lecture in London. Two venues in Berlin cancelled live events scheduled to be hosted by Icke in 2017 following accusations of antisemitism. The Maritim hotel did not give a reason for the cancellation, but the Carl Benz Arena wrote on its Facebook page that it was due to the "contentious nature and the contradictory statements, which for us as a politically neutral event venue do not give a clear picture." An event to be held at Manchester United's Old Trafford was also cancelled in 2017, with the venue saying it was due to Icke's "objectionable views." After Icke's talk in Vancouver on 2 September 2017, the Canadian Jewish News called him "a controversial conspiracy theorist, antisemite and Holocaust denier". Micheal Vonn, the British Columbia Civil Liberties Association's policy director, told the newspaper: "You are free to be a racist in Canada, you are free to say so and tell others that they should be, too."

In February 2019, the Australian Government cancelled Icke's visa ahead of a planned speaking tour on the grounds of his character. Immigration Minister David Coleman upheld the complaint made by Dvir Abramovich, the chairman of the Anti-Defamation Commission. This decision was applauded by both major political parties. Labor's immigration spokesman, Shayne Neumann, said, "Labor welcomes the fact that the Government did what we called on them to do and refused David Icke's visa application." Icke issued a statement in which he described himself as "the victim of a smear campaign from politicians who have been listening to special interest groups".

On 4 November 2022, it was reported that Icke had been banned from entering the Netherlands for two years, after being sent a letter from the Dutch government saying that his presence in the country would pose a risk to public order. The ban also prevents Icke from entering the EU's visa-free Schengen Area. A request by Icke for a temporary lift of the ban was denied by a Dutch court in December 2024.

=== Other responses ===
Political Research Associates has described Icke's politics as "a mishmash of most of the dominant themes of contemporary neofascism, mixed in with a smattering of topics culled from the U.S. militia movement." He opposes gun control, and claims that many mass shootings were orchestrated to increase public opposition to guns. He believes the U.S. government carried out the Oklahoma City bombing. He endorses or recommends antisemitic and far-right publications such as Spotlight and On Target, the magazine of the white supremacist group the "British League of Rights", and has been closely associated with antisemitic "New Age" periodicals such as Nexus and Rainbow Ark, a "New Age" magazine which is financed by far-right activists and affiliated with the neo-Nazi National Front. The neo-Nazi terrorist group Combat 18 promoted Icke's public speaking events in its internal journal Putsch; of one such event, the journal wrote approvingly:

[Icke] spoke of "the sheep" and how the Zionist-operated government, sorry, "Illuminati", uses them for its own ends. He began to talk about the big conspiracy by a group of bankers, media moguls, etc. – always being clever enough not to mention what all these had in common.

Michael Barkun has described Icke's position as New Age conspiracism, writing that Icke is the most fluent of the genre, describing his work as "improvisational millennialism", with an end-of-history scenario involving a final battle between good and evil. Barkun defines improvisational millennialism as an "act of bricolage": because everything is connected in the conspiracist world view, every source can be mined for links. Barkun argues that Icke has actively tried to cultivate the radical right: "There is no fuller explication of [their] beliefs about ruling elites than Icke's." He also notes that Icke regards Christian patriots as the only Americans who understand the "New World Order". In 1996 Icke spoke to a conference in Reno, Nevada, alongside opponents of the Brady Handgun Violence Prevention Act, including Kirk Lyons, a lawyer who has represented the Ku Klux Klan. Icke has never been a member of any right-wing group, and he has criticised them.

Relying on Douglas Kellner's distinction between clinical paranoia and a "critical paranoia" that confronts power, Richard Kahn and Tyson Lewis argue that Icke displays elements of both and that his reptilian hypothesis and his "postmodern metanarrative" may be allegorical, a Swiftian satire which is used to give ordinary people a narrative with which to question what they see around them and alert them to the alleged emergence of a global fascist state.

People influenced by Icke have asked public figures if they are lizards. An Official Information Act request was filed in New Zealand in 2008 to ask John Key, then prime minister, whether he was a lizard. Facebook CEO Mark Zuckerberg was asked the same during a Q&A in 2016. Both men said they were not lizards. In a 2013 survey in the United States by Public Policy Polling, 4% believed that "'lizard people' control our societies".

== Selected works ==
Books

- (1983) It's a Tough Game, Son!, London: Piccolo Books. ISBN 0-330-28047-3
- (1989) It Doesn't Have To Be Like This: Green Politics Explained, London: Green Print. ISBN 1-85425-033-7
- (1991) The Truth Vibrations, London: Gateway. ISBN 1-85860-006-5
- (1992) Love Changes Everything, London: HarperCollins Publishers. ISBN 1-85538-247-4
- (1993) In the Light of Experience: The Autobiography of David Icke, London: Warner Books. ISBN 0-7515-0603-6
- (1993) Days of Decision, London: Jon Carpenter Publishing. ISBN 1-897766-01-7
- (1993) Heal the World: A Do-It-Yourself Guide to Personal and Planetary Transformation, London: Gateway. ISBN 1-85860-005-7
- (1994) The Robot's Rebellion, London: Gateway. ISBN 1-85860-022-7
- (1995) ... And the Truth Shall Set You Free, Ryde: Bridge of Love Publications. ISBN 0-9538810-5-9
- (1996) I Am Me, I Am Free: The Robot's Guide to Freedom, New York: Truth Seeker. ISBN 0-9526147-5-8
- (1998) Lifting the Veil: David Icke interviewed by Jon Rappoport. New York: Truth Seeker. ISBN 0-939040-05-0
- (1999) The Biggest Secret: The Book That Will Change the World, Ryde: Bridge of Love Publications. ISBN 0-9526147-6-6
- (2001) Children of the Matrix, Ryde: Bridge of Love Publications. ISBN 0-9538810-1-6
- (2002) Alice in Wonderland and the World Trade Center Disaster, Ryde: Bridge of Love Publications. ISBN 0-9538810-2-4
- (2003) Tales from the Time Loop, Ryde: Bridge of Love Publications. ISBN 0-9538810-4-0
- (2005) Infinite Love Is the Only Truth: Everything Else Is Illusion, Ryde: Bridge of Love Publications. ISBN 0-9538810-6-7
- (2007) The David Icke Guide to the Global Conspiracy (and how to end it), Ryde: David Icke Books Ltd. ISBN 978-0-9538810-8-6
- (2010) Human Race Get Off Your Knees: The Lion Sleeps No More, Ryde: David Icke Books Ltd. ISBN 978-0-9559973-1-0
- (2012) Remember Who You Are: Remember 'Where' You Are and Where You 'Come' From, Ryde: David Icke Books Ltd. ISBN 0-9559973-3-X
- (2013) The Perception Deception: Or ... It's All Bollocks — Yes, All of It, Ryde: David Icke Books Ltd. ISBN 978-0-955997389
- (2016) Phantom Self (And how to find the real one), Ryde: David Icke Books Ltd. ISBN 978-0-9576308-8-8
- (2017) Everything You Need To Know But Have Never Been Told, Ryde: David Icke Books Ltd. ISBN 978-1527207264
- (2019) The Trigger: The Lie That Changed The World, Ryde: David Icke Books Ltd. ISBN 978-1-916025806
- (2020) The Answer, Ryde: David Icke Books Ltd. ISBN 978-1916025820
- (2021) Perceptions of a Renegade Mind, Ryde: David Icke Books Ltd. ISBN 978-1838415310
- (2022) The Trap : What it is, how is works, and how we escape its illusions, Ryde: David Icke Books Ltd. ISBN 978-1838415327
- (2023) The Dream: The Extraordinary Revelation Of Who We Are And Where We Are. David Icke Books. ISBN 978-1838415334

Videos

- (1994) The Robots' Rebellion
- (1996) Turning of the Tide
- (1998) The Freedom Road
- (1999) David Icke: The Reptilian Agenda, with Zulu Sanusi (Shaman) Credo Mutwa
- (1999) David Icke: Revelations of a Mother Goddess, with Arizona Wilder
- (2000) David Icke Live in Vancouver: From Prison to Paradise
- (2003) Secrets of the Matrix
- (2006) Freedom or Fascism: The Time to Choose
- (2008) David Icke Live at the Oxford Union Debating Society on YouTube
- (2008) Beyond the Cutting Edge: Live from Brixton Academy
- (2008) David Icke: Big Brother, the BIG Picture
- (2010) The Lion Sleeps No More
- (2012) Return to Peru
- (2012) Remember Who You Are: Live at Wembley Arena
- (2014) Awaken: Live from Wembley Arena
- (2017) Worldwide Wakeup Tour Live
- (2019) Renegade

== See also ==
- Chitauri (based on Icke's ideas)
- Gnosticism
- The Shadow Kingdom
