= Daniel Peixoto =

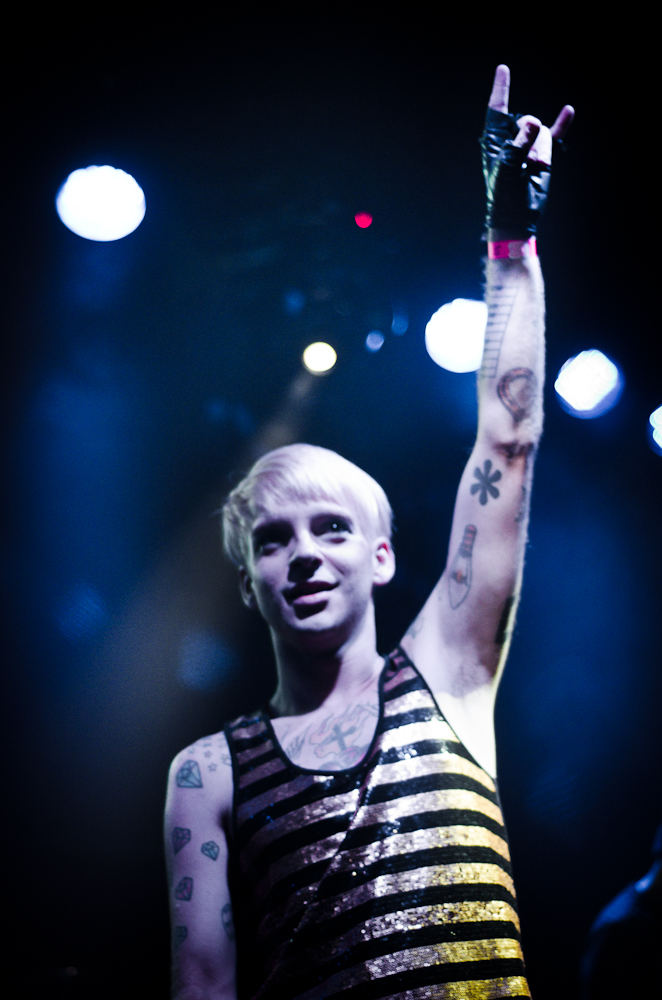
- Daniel Peixoto (2012)

Background information
- Born: Daniel Peixoto Cordeiro de Farias; January 5, 1986 (age 40); Fortaleza, Ceará, Brazil
- Origin: Brazil
- Genres: Pop, electronica, Brazilian popular music, trip hop
- Occupation: Singer
- Instruments: Vocals, guitar, piano
- Years active: 2005–present
- Website: http://danipeixoto.tnb.art.br/

Daniel Peixoto (/peɪˈʃoʊtoʊ/ pay-SHOH-toh, born January 5, 1986) is a Brazilian singer and performer of pop, electronica and Brazilian popular music.

== Biography ==
Daniel Peixoto was born in the Aldeota district of Fortaleza, Ceará. He began singing professionally around the age of 22, but since his childhood, he learned to play piano and act. During his adolescence he also did fashion model's work and host regional TV shows. His passion to singers like Madonna, Iggy Pop, David Bowie – which he was compared to by a journalist of The Guardian – and Björk push him to the music world and, in 2005, he emerged as the frontman of electropunk duo, Montage, which was praised by Justin Timberlake as "The Prodigy meets Shiny Toy Guns with tons of Brazilian passion. Taste it only if you dare". Actually, Daniel opened the Prodigy Brazil's concert in 2009, but alone, without the duo, who separated in the same year.

In 2011, Daniel Peixoto goes in a solo career, Mastigando Humanos debut album was released in that year, along with the EP Shine, launched in Europe, while touring, by French-Brazilian label AbatJour Records. MTV IGGY presented him with an accolade article and, consequently, he won the Artist of the Week MTV IGGY also chosen him as the second, in TOP 10, of best tecno brega artists from Brazil.

He peaked the TOP 10 in the German Airplay Chart with the song Eu Só Paro Se Cair (I Only Stop When I Fall Over).

Daniel developed a dance party, a mix of music, fashion and art, called Shine Party. The third, and last, edition featured the tecno brega muse, Gaby Amarantos. The song "Olhos Castanhos" (Brown Eyes) is in the soundtrack of Brazilian telenovela, "Lado a Lado" (in English, Side by Side). The song "Shine" became single with video.

His last single from "Mastigando Humanos" was Flei, released on January 29 as a digital EP along with two remixes to the song. The video was shot in Fortaleza.

In 2016, Peixoto released the first single, "Crush (Manda Nude)", to his second solo album, "Massa".

== Discography ==
Title	Year	Record label	Media
Mastigando Humanos	2011	Fora do Eixo Discos	CD
Shine	2011	AbatJour Records	EP

Single	Year	Record label	Media
Come to Me	2009	Fora do Eixo Discos	CD & Digital Download
Eu só Paro Se Cair	2011	Fora do Eixo Discos	Digital Download
Olhos Castanhos	2011	Fora do Eixo Discos	Digital Download & "Lado a Lado" Soundtrack CD
Shine	2013	AbatJour Records	Digital Download
Flei	2014	AbatJour Records	Digital Download
