= Shine-Gri-La, Washington =

Unincorporated community in Washington, United States

- Unincorporated community
- Nickname: Shine
- Location within Washington (state) Location within the United States
- Coordinates: 47°52′10″N 122°41′21″W
- Country: United States
- State: Washington
- County: Jefferson
- Elevation: 13 ft (4.0 m)
- Time zone: UTC-8 (Pacific (PST))
  - Summer (DST): UTC-7 (PDT)
- Area code(s): 360, 564
- GNIS feature ID: 1531652

Shine-Gri-La or Shine is an unincorporated community in Jefferson County, in the U.S. state of Washington.

== History ==
Phillip Noah Rasler originally submitted a request to name the community Squamish on March 25, 1905, but after approval a month later, the order of establishment was rescinded that October. Robert Alexander Slyter (Phillip Rasler's brother-in-law) resubmitted the request to name the community Squamish two years later, in October 1907. The request was similarly rescinded a year later with a final request to change the name to Shine. Robert Alexander Slyter was the first appointed postmaster of Shine, which was officially named January 15, 1909, and remained in operation until 1923. The community's name is a variation of "sunshine".
