= David D. Schein =

- Education: University of Pennsylvania; University of Houston
- Occupations: Author; Academic

David D. Schein is an American author and academic. He is a tenured professor and associate dean at the University of St. Thomas and holds Cameron Endowed Chair. Previously, he taught at Rice University.

His books have received multiple reviews including from the Houston Public Media.

== Early life and education ==
Schein was born in a military family to Leo Schein and Catherine Bradley. He received his early education from the Norview Senior High School. He attended the University of Pennsylvania, where he graduated with a Bachelor of Arts in transportation and public utilities. Later, he enrolled in the University of Virginia, where he got a master's degree in business administration and doctorate in philosophy. In 1977, he earned a doctorate in law from the University of Houston.

== Career ==
In 1992, he was a candidate of the Republican Party for the Texas House of Representatives, District 148.

Schein is a tenured professor at the University of St. Thomas and is an associate dean and the director of graduate programs. He has also served as the director of Health Access Texas and the director of Houston Council.

In 2022, his third book, Bad Deal for America, was published.

== Bibliography ==
- Teaching Undergraduate Business Ethics (2014)
- The Decline of America: 100 Years of Leadership Failures (2018)
- Bad Deal for America (2022)
