= Edgar Schein =

Swiss-American psychologist (1928–2023)

Edgar H. Schein
- Born: March 5, 1928; Zürich, Switzerland
- Died: January 26, 2023 (aged 94)
- Education: Harvard University, Stanford University, University of Chicago
- Known for: coercive persuasion, organizational development, career development, group process consultation, organizational culture
- Scientific career
- Fields: Psychology
- Workplaces: MIT Sloan School of Management

Edgar Henry Schein (March 5, 1928 – January 26, 2023) was a Swiss-born American business theorist and psychologist who was professor at the MIT Sloan School of Management. He was a foundational researcher in the discipline of organizational behavior, and made notable contributions in the field of organizational development in many areas, including career development, group process consultation, and organizational culture. One of his most notable works, Coercive Persuasion (1961), was funded by the CIA as a part of the infamously illegal Project MK-Ultra, though he claimed later to be unaware of his funding source. He was the son of former University of Chicago professor Marcel Schein.

== Model of organizational culture ==
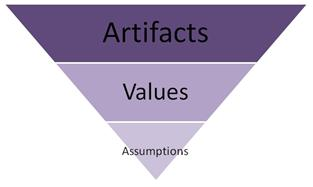
Illustration of Schein's model of organizational culture

Schein's model of organizational culture originated in the 1980s. Schein (2004) identifies three distinct levels in organizational cultures:

1. artifacts and behaviours
2. espoused values
3. assumptions

The three levels refer to the degree to which the different cultural phenomena are visible to the observer.

- Artifacts include any tangible, overt or verbally identifiable elements in any organization. Architecture, furniture, dress code, office jokes, all exemplify organizational artifacts. Artifacts are the visible elements in a culture and they can be recognized by people not part of the culture.
- Espoused values are the organization's stated values and rules of behavior. It is how the members represent the organization both to themselves and to others. This is often expressed in official philosophies and public statements of identity. It can sometimes often be a projection for the future, of what the members hope to become. Examples of this would be employee professionalism, or a "family first" mantra. Trouble may arise if espoused values by leaders are not in line with the deeper tacit assumptions of the culture.
- Shared basic assumptions are the deeply embedded, taken-for-granted behaviours which are usually unconscious, but constitute the essence of culture. These assumptions are typically so well integrated in the office dynamic that they are hard to recognize from within.

== Career anchors ==
The career anchor is a part of what one finds as they clarify their self-image surrounding one's (1) needs and motives, (2) talents, and (3) values, the anchor being set of needs, values, and talents that a person is least willing to give up when forced to make a choice. The concept is Schein's attempt to reflect the lifelong search of every human to find themselves.

Schein's original research in the mid-1970s identified five possible career anchor groups: (1) autonomy/independence, (2) security/stability, (3) technical-functional competence, (4) general managerial competence, and (5) entrepreneurial creativity. Follow-up studies in the 1980s identified three additional constructs: (6) service or dedication to a cause, (7) pure challenge, and (8) life style.

A 2008 study distinguishes between entrepreneurship and creativity to form nine possible constructs.

== Education ==
- PhD, social psychology, Harvard University, 1952
- Master's Degree, Psychology, Stanford University, 1949
- PhB, BA, University of Chicago, 1947

== Publications ==
- Coercive Persuasion: A Socio-psychological Analysis of the "Brainwashing" of American Civilian Prisoners by the Chinese Communists with Inge Schneier and Curtis H. Barker (1961) W. W. Norton & Company; ISBN 978-0393006131.
- Professional Education: Some New Directions (1972) McGraw-Hill; ISBN 978-0070100428.
- Career Dynamics: Matching Individual and Organizational Needs (1978) Addison-Wesley; ISBN 978-0201068344.
- Organizational Psychology, 3rd Edition (1979) Pearson; ISBN 978-0136413325.
- The Clinical Perspective in Field Work (1987) Sage University Papers Series on Qualitative Research Methods, Vol. 5.; ISBN 978-0803929753.
- The Art of Managing Human Resources edited by Edgar H. Schein (1987) Oxford University Press; ISBN 978-0195048827.
- Strategic Pragmatism: The Culture of Singapore's Economic Development Board (1996) MIT Press; ISBN 978-0262534048.
- Process Consultation Revisited: Building the Helping Relationship (1998) Addison-Wesley Longman; ISBN 978-0201345964.
- DEC Is Dead, Long Live DEC: The Lasting Legacy of Digital Equipment Corporation with Peter S. DeLisi, Paul J. Kampas, and Michael M. Sonduck (2004) Berrett-Koehler Publishers; ISBN 978-1576753057.
- Procesadvisering: Over De Ondersteunende Rol Van De Adviseur En De Samenwerking Tussen Adviseur En Client (2005) Academic Service; ISBN 978-9052615318.
- Helping: How to Offer, Give, and Receive Help (2011) Berrett-Koehler Publishers; ISBN 978-1605098562.
- Career Anchors: The Changing Nature of Careers Self Assessment, 4th Edition with John VanMaanen (2013) Wiley; ISBN 978-1118455760.
- Organizational Psychology Then and Now: Some Observations. Annual Review of Organizational Psychology and Organizational Behavior, Vol. 2., pp. 1-19 (2015).
- Dialogic Organization Development: The Theory and Practice of Transformational Change edited by Gervase R. Bushe & Robert J. Marshak, foreword Edgar Schein (2015) Berrett-Koehler Publishers; ISBN 978-1626564046.
- Becoming American: My First Learning Journey (2016) iUniverse; ISBN 978-1491789858.
- Humble Consulting: How to Provide Real Help Faster (2016) Berrett-Koehler Publishers; ISBN 978-1626567207.
- Organizational Culture and Leadership, 5th Edition with Peter A. Schein (2016) Wiley; ISBN 978-1119212041.
- Humble Leadership: The Power of Relationships, Openness, and Trust with Peter A. Schein (2018) Berrett-Koehler Publishers; ISBN 978-1523095384.
- The Corporate Culture Survival Guide, 3rd Edition with Peter A. Schein (2019) Wiley; ISBN 978-1119212287.
- Humble Inquiry: The Gentle Art of Asking Instead of Telling, 2nd Edition with Peter A. Schein (2021) Berrett-Koehler Publishers; ISBN 978-1523092628.

== Awards, honors ==
Awards

- Lifetime Achievement Award in Workplace Learning and Performance of the American Society of Training and Development, February 3, 2000
- Everett Cherrington Hughes Award for Career Scholarship, Careers Division of the Academy of Management, August 8, 2000
- Marion Gislason Award for Leadership in Executive Development, Boston University School of Management Executive Development Roundtable, December 11, 2002
- Distinguished Scholar-Practitioner Award of the Academy of Management, 2009
- Life Time Achievement Award from the International Leadership Association, 2012
- Honorary Doctorate from the IEDC Bled School of Management in Slovenia, 2012

Professional

- Fellow, American Psychological Association
- Fellow, Academy of Management

Board member

- Advisory Board, Institute of Nuclear Power Operations
- Board Member, Massachusetts Audubon Society
- Board Member, Boston Lyric Opera

== See also ==
- Warren Bennis
- Harold Leavitt
- David Nadler
- John Van Maanen
- List of social psychologists
