= WTMK =

- Wanatah, Indiana; United States
- Frequency: 88.5 MHz
- Branding: Shine.fm

Programming
- Format: Christian adult contemporary

Ownership
- Owner: Olivet Nazarene University
- Sister stations: WONU, WHZN

History
- First air date: 2005

Technical information
- Licensing authority: FCC
- Facility ID: 90498
- Class: A
- ERP: 3,400 watts
- HAAT: 109.8 meters (360 ft)
- Transmitter coordinates: 41°18′15.00″N 87°01′30.00″W

Links
- Public license information: Public file; LMS
- Webcast: Listen Live
- Website: shine.fm

WTMK (88.5 FM) is a radio station broadcasting a Christian adult contemporary format. Licensed to Wanatah, Indiana, United States, the station is currently owned by Olivet Nazarene University.

== History ==
WTMK began broadcasting in 2005 and was originally licensed to Lowell, Indiana. It aired a Christian format was owned by CSN International. In 2008, CSN International sold WTMK, along with a number of other stations, to Calvary Radio Network, Inc. These stations were sold to Calvary Chapel Costa Mesa later that year. In 2010, Calvary Radio Network purchased WTMK back from Calvary Chapel Costa Mesa. The station was sold to Olivet Nazarene University later that year for $130,000, and began broadcasting the Christian contemporary music format known as Shine.fm. In 2015, the station was moved from Lowell, Indiana to Wanatah.
