= Shine (Daniel Peixoto EP) =

EP by Daniel Peixoto
- Released: June 2011 (Worldwide)
- Recorded: 2009–2011
- Genre: Tecno brega, electronica, Latin pop
- Length: 21:38
- Label: AbatJour Records

Daniel Peixoto chronology
Mastigando Humanos (2011)	Shine (2011)

Shine is the first EP released by Brazilian singer Daniel Peixoto and was released in June 2011, by French label AbatJour Records. Peixoto was chosen "Artist of the Week" in voting of MTV IGGY from New York City.

The single "Eu Só Paro Se Cair" peaked at number ten on the German Airplay Chart. "Shine" became single on February 16, 2013 with a videoclip shot in the tropical beaches of Fortaleza.

== Track listing ==
No.	Title	Lyrics	Length
1.	"Shine" (feat. Nayra Costa)	Daniel Peixoto, Ellen Lima	4:08
2.	"Flei" (feat. Carol Teixeira)	Peixoto, Elida Braz	3:16
3.	"Eu Só Paro Se Cair"	Peixoto	4:18
4.	"Come to Me (Disco Killah Remix)"	Peixoto, Ellen Lima	5:06
5.	"I Trust My Dealer (Bloodshake Remix)"	Peixoto	4:50
Total length:			21:38
