= Endress+Hauser Optical Analysis =

Endress+Hauser Optical Analysis, Inc.
- Type: Private
- Industry: Industrial gas
- Founded: 1999
- Headquarters: Ann Arbor, Michigan, United States
- Products: Gas Analyzers
- Number of employees: 114
- Parent: Endress+Hauser (wholly owned subsidiary)
- Website: spectrasensors.com

Endress+Hauser Optical Analysis, Inc. is a manufacturer of optical-based gas sensors for the industrial process, environmental monitoring and clean technology markets. The company's sensors measure the absorption of laser light at specific wavelengths to detect carbon dioxide and water vapor in industrial process control and environmental monitoring applications. Such applications include non-contact measurement of moisture, carbon dioxide, and other corrosives in the energy industry, petrochemical industry, arsenic and other impurities in drinking water (Water Quality), and airborne water vapor and other atmospheric measurements from commercial aircraft for the U.S. and International Weather Services (Atmospheric).

The company is a wholly owned subsidiary of the Endress+Hauser formed when the Endress+Hauser subsidiaries SpectraSensors, Inc. and Kaiser Optical Systems, Inc. merged effective 1 January 2022. Kaiser Optical Systems was focused on Raman spectroscopic analyzers for solid, liquid, and gas analysis, and SpectraSensors was focused on gas analysis using tunable diode laser absorption spectroscopy (TDLAS). The company is headquartered in Ann Arbor, Michigan; Raman spectroscopic analyzers are developed and manufactured there, while tunable diode laser absorption spectroscopy (TDLAS) instrumentation is produced in Rancho Cucamonga, California.

== Products ==
Endress+Hauser Optical Analysis uses tunable diode laser (TDL) technology in conjunction with absorption spectroscopy in an array of products such as ambient air monitoring analyzers, moisture analyzers (hygrometers), dew point analyzers, and hydrogen sulfide analyzers, gas analyzers for natural gas pipelines, petrochemical refineries, environmental technology, and gas quality applications. Endress+Hauser Optical Analysis’ gas analyzers measure moisture (H_{2}O), carbon dioxide (CO_{2}), hydrogen sulfide (H_{2}S), hydrogen chloride (HCl), methane (CH_{4}), ammonia (NH_{3}), ethylene oxide (ETO), and more.

Typical applications include gas quality and energy measurements (H_{2}O, CO_{2}, H_{2}S, BTU) in natural gas, trace moisture and hydrogen sulfide in refineries and petrochemical plants, and airborne moisture and other atmospheric measurements from commercial aircraft for the U.S. and international weather services.

The heart of TDL systems is a small laser diode that produces a very specific wavelength of light tuned to a harmonic frequency of the target gas molecule in the near infrared band. The light causes the molecule to vibrate and therefore, absorb energy. Once adjusted to the specific frequency of the molecule, the laser is minutely tuned to different wavelengths on either side of their target wavelength. The light energy being absorbed at the target gas frequency is compared to the light energy at the surrounding frequencies, resulting in an extremely precise measurement. New data are integrated every second, making the system quick to respond to variations in the target gas.

Natural gas distributors are currently using the company's extraction monitors to quantify levels of water vapor and carbon dioxide in their natural gas pipelines. The application calls for a rugged device, which can withstand the harsh environments in these pipes with low parts-per-million sensitivity. Today, many suppliers transport their product to many customers through a shared pipeline infrastructure. Market rates for gas products are determined, in part, by the moisture levels and purity of natural gas. Relative moisture levels indicate whether a gas is "wet" or "dry," while carbon dioxide levels tell the distributor whether the product is "clean" or "dirty." The requirement to measure humidity is also driven by the corrosive effect that water can have in combination with other chemicals in the pipes. Corrosion can lead to leaks, which can lead to a potentially dangerous situation.

Clean tech applications include identifying and harvesting methane (CH_{4}) as a clean energy source, as well as mounting sensors on commercial airliners to enable real-time monitoring of weather conditions to avoid commercial flight delays totaling $1 billion per year in wasted time and fuel.

== History ==
The company SpectraSensors was spun out of the NASA/Caltech Jet Propulsion Laboratory in 1999 to commercialize TDL technology. SpectraSensors Inc. was formed by former NASA engineers after developing TDLAS moisture measurement technology for NASA’s 1999 Mars Polar Lander program, creating a company called Tunable Photonics which was later renamed in 2001 to SpectraSensors. It raised about $8 million in private equity funding from investors including Chevron Technology Ventures, American River Ventures, Nomura New Energy & Clean Technology Ventures, Blueprint Ventures, and Nth Power. Before focusing on the natural gas and process gas industry, SpectraSensors used TDLs to measure atmospheric conditions. In most cases, water vapor data is gathered by an older style of sensor using a thin-film capacitor. These sensors are launched on weather balloons every 12 hours from stations around the country. Satellites also gather water vapor data, but at low vertical resolution.

Shortly after the company was founded, a fatal pipeline explosion occurred in New Mexico, launching a federal investigation which found that the pipeline which failed had corroded due to excessive, undetected water. The pipeline company was then mandated to install a better class of water monitoring technology which would more accurately monitor and report moisture in their gas distribution infrastructure, prompting the company which had experienced the accident to contact Tunable Photonics which built and then delivered two prototype TDLAS measurement devices to meet federal requirements and expectations.

By the end of 2010, SpectraSensors delivered the first Water Vapor Sensing System (WVSS-II) with flight evaluations by the U.S. National Weather Service, and had launched a variety of products to measure hydrogen sulfide, oxygen and other analytes, expanding to refining, petrochemical, gas processing and LNG markets.

Endress+Hauser acquired SpectraSensors in 2012 and Kaiser Optical Systems in 2013. The two subsidiaries merged effective 1 January 2022 to form Endress+Hauser Optical Analysis, consolidating the group’s expertise in laser-based measurement technology within a single business unit.

== See also ==
- Raman spectroscopy
- Tunable diode laser absorption spectroscopy
