= Shiny =

Shiny may refer to gloss (optics), the ability of a surface to reflect light in a specular way.

== Film and television ==
- "Shiny", an episode of the TV series The Pinky and Perky Show
- Shiny, a character in the TV series Dinosaur Train
- Shiny, a character in the film Saving Santa
- "Shiny!", an episode of the TV series Pocoyo

== Music ==
- Shiny, a 1999 album by Kari Wuhrer
- Shiny, a 2005 album by The Bang
- "Shiny", a song on the 2001 EP 5 Songs by the Decemberists
- "Shiny" a song from the 2016 Disney film Moana

== People ==
- Shiny Abraham (born 1965), an Indian athlete
- Shiny Doshi, an Indian television actress and model
- Shiney Ahuja, Indian film actor and model

== Other uses ==
- Shiny Entertainment, a former American video game developer
- Shiny (software), an R package for developing web applications

== See also ==
- Shiny Joe Ryan (born 1987), an Australian musician
- "Shiny Shiny", a 1983 new wave song by British pop band Haysi Fantayzee
- Shinee, South Korean boy band
