= Shines =

Shines is a surname. Notable people with the surname include:

- Johnny Shines (1915–1992), American musician
- Razor Shines (born 1956), American baseball player

== See also ==
- Shine (disambiguation)
