= Shine On =

Shine On may refer to:

== Albums ==
- Shine On (L.T.D. album), 1980
- Shine On (George Jones album), a 1983 album and song by George Jones
- Shine On (Pink Floyd album), a 1992 box set album by Pink Floyd
- Shine On (Kee Marcello album), 1995
- Shine On (Riot album), 1998
- Shine On (Ralph Stanley album), 2005
- Shine On (Jet album), 2006
- Shine On: The Ultimate Collection, a 2010 album by Laura Branigan
- Shine On (Sarah McLachlan album), 2014
- Shine On, a 1978 album by Climax Blues Band
- Shine On, a 1980 greatest hits album by Kenny Rogers and The First Edition
- Shine On, a 2006 EP by Apoptygma Berzerk
- Shine On, a 2020 album by Adelitas Way
- Shine On, a 2022 album by Paul Oakenfold

== Songs ==
- "Shine On" (Alcazar song), 1999
- "Shine On" (Christine Milton song), 2004
- "Shine On" (Degrees of Motion song), 1994
- "Shine On" (The House of Love song), 1987
- "Shine On" (Humble Pie song), 1971
- "Shine On" (Jet song), 2006
- "Shine On" (The Kooks song), 2008
- "Shine On" (Mike Peters song), 1996
- "Shine On" (R.I.O. song), 2008
- "Shine On" (Ryan Cabrera song), 2005
- "Shine On" (The Screaming Jets song), 1991
- "Shine On (Shine All Your Sweet Love on Me)", by George Jones, 1983
- "Shine On You Crazy Diamond", originally performed as "Shine On", by Pink Floyd, 1975
- "Shine On", by The Amity Affliction, 2015
- "Shine On", by Badfinger from Badfinger, 1974
- "Shine On", by Bucks Fizz from Bucks Fizz, 1981
- "Shine On", by Chris de Burgh from Power of Ten, 1992
- "Shine On", by Gamma Ray from Somewhere Out in Space, 1997
- "Shine On", by James Blunt from All the Lost Souls, 2007
- "Shine On", by May Erlewine
- "Shine On", by Nas from Hip Hop Is Dead, 2006
- "Shine On", by Needtobreathe from Daylight, 2006
- "Shine On", by Nik Kershaw from 15 Minutes, 1998
- "Shine On", by The Samples from the 1996 album Outpost, 1996
- "Shine On", by Simply Red from Big Love, 2015
- "Shine On", by Status Quo from Under the Influence, 1999
- "Shine On", by George Duke from Dream On, 1982
