= Betty Shine =

English author, opera singer and Spiritualist

- Born: 1929
- Died: March 2002 (aged 72–73)
- Occupation(s): Medium, author
- Children: Janet Shine, Geoffrey Shine

Betty Shine (1929 – March 2002) was an English author, opera singer and Spiritualist. Shine was a psychic, medium and spiritual healer.

== Career ==
Shine is best known for her "Mind" series of books including Mind to Mind (1989), Mind Magic (1991) and Mind Waves. Together, the first two books spent 19 weeks in The Sunday Times Top 10 best seller lists.

Later, she claimed to have foreseen the events of 9-11.

She started her global Healing Network, along with her daughter, Janet Shine who continues the network and continues to make Betty Shine materials available.

== Controversial claim ==
Shine had spoken with David Icke when he went to her for a consultation, when she told him he was the Son of God among other claims.

It may be possible that in the Rosicrucian tradition that Betty Shine is referring to in relation to Icke, the term "Son of God" (or "Daughter of God") simply means someone who has purified themselves and developed such high levels of self-sacrifice that they have reached a level of consciousness that rises above bodily desires and selfishness to the greater good and the brotherhood of mankind. In his book The Great Initiates, French philosopher Édouard Schuré, indicates that Hindu, Egyptian and Ancient Greek initiation traditions use the description "Son of God" to mean "a consciousness identical with divine truth, a will capable of manifesting it".

Icke directly compared himself to Jesus Christ whilst being interviewed on Wogan in 1991. Icke appeared on the show in a turquoise tracksuit and claimed to be "a son of the Godhead".

== Death ==
Shine died on 26 March 2002 of heart failure.

== Bibliography ==
- Mind to Mind (1989)
- Mind Magic (1991)
- Mind Waves (1993)
- Mind Workbook
- My Life as a Medium (1996)
- The Infinite Mind
- Clear your Mind
- Free your Mind
- A Mind of Your Own (1998)
- A Free Spirit (2002)
