= WHZN =

Shine.FM radio station in New Whiteland, Indiana

- New Whiteland, Indiana; United States
- Broadcast area: Indianapolis metropolitan area
- Frequency: 88.3 MHz
- Branding: Shine.FM

Programming
- Format: Christian adult contemporary

Ownership
- Owner: Olivet Nazarene University
- Sister stations: WONU, WTMK

History
- First air date: June 15, 2009
- Call sign meaning: Horizon Christian Fellowship (former owner)

Technical information
- Licensing authority: FCC
- Facility ID: 93005
- Class: B
- ERP: 1 watt horizontal; 7,800 watts vertical
- HAAT: 221 meters (725 ft)
- Transmitter coordinates: 39°24′14″N 86°08′41″W

Links
- Public license information: Public file; LMS
- Webcast: Listen Live
- Website: shine.fm

WHZN (88.3 FM, "Shine.FM") is a radio station licensed to New Whiteland, Indiana. Owned by Olivet Nazarene University, it broadcasts a Christian adult contemporary format serving the Indianapolis area. Its transmitter is located in Trafalgar, Indiana.

== History ==
The station originally signed on under the ownership of Horizon Christian Fellowship of Indianapolis, under the branding 88.3 The Walk. It was granted Program Test Authority from the Federal Communications Commission (FCC) on June 15, 2009, and its license was granted on October 9, 2009. The station launched with a worship music format,

WHZN was sold to Olivet Nazarene University in 2011, after which it rebranded as part of its Shine.FM network.
