= Seam sealant =

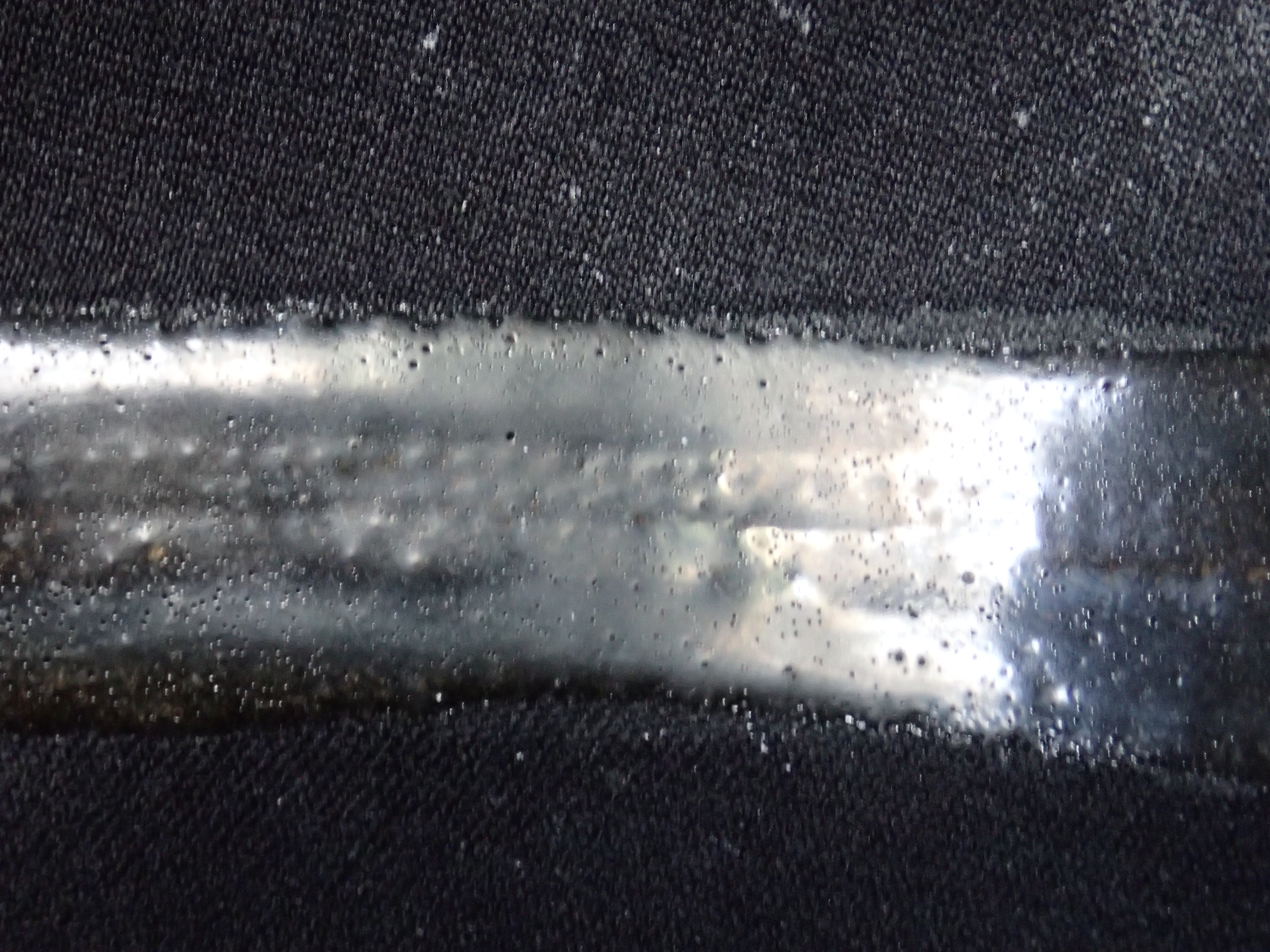
Seam sealant on a drysuit made from neoprene

Seam sealants are chemical coating compositions.

== Textiles ==
Seam sealants are applied to waterproof seams of items such as rainwear, tents, backpacks, shoes, drysacks, and drysuits. They are often applied by the consumer post-purchase.

== Automotive industry ==
Seam sealing was already performed manually successfully for preventing perforation corrosion in the 1980s. Today used in the OEM automotive industry primarily for the purpose of seals against air leaks and to waterproof sheetmetal overlaps that occur in the assembly of a vehicle. Such overlaps are typically decorative rather than structurally supportive. Accordingly, they are usually only spot welded and this process results in a closure that is not air or water tight.

Seam sealants are sprayed or extruded over the joined edges of these overlaps, and they then either cure to a flexible waterproof "seal" by drying (dehydrating) in the case of water borne compositions, or thermoset irreversibly to a flexible adherent seam seal by going through an oven bake in the case of plasticized polyvinylchloride compositions. Most interior seam seals are not visible after the vehicle is finished, because they are covered by carpeting, interior roof headliner, or decorative trim panels. Exterior seam seals are always painted over and are referred to as "coach joint seals."

The flat-stream application with many special solutions (special nozzles) was increasingly used as the most flexible procedure.
