= SHINE Expert System =

Software development tool

Spacecraft Health Inference Engine (SHINE) is a software-development tool for knowledge-based systems, created by the Artificial intelligence Group, Information Systems Technology Section at NASA/JPL. The system is in use in basic and applied AI research at JPL. SHINE was designed to operate in a real-time environment. It is written in Common LISP, but able to be utilized by non-LISP applications written in conventional programming languages such as C and C++. These non-LISP applications can be running in a distributed computing environment on remote computers or on a computer that supports multiple programming languages. SHINE provides a variety of facilities for the development of software modules for the primary functions in knowledge-based reasoning engines. The system may be used to develop artificial intelligence applications as well as specialized tools for research efforts.

== Background ==
The original inventors of SHINE are Mark L. James and David J. Atkinson. SHINE is an expert system and inference engine based upon the experience, requirements and technology that were collected by the Artificial Intelligence Research group at NASA/JPL in developing expert systems for the diagnosis of spacecraft health. SHINE is based on technology first developed by James and Atkinson for the "STAR*TOOL" system. SHINE itself resulted from applying this technology in a project called "Spacecraft Health Automated Reasoning Pilot" (SHARP). SHARP aimed to automate and provide expert system consultation to space flight operations personnel who monitor and diagnose robotic spacecraft on science missions, such as the Voyager spacecraft.

- SHINE is written in Common LISP and can be run on any system that supports the language. It has been interfaced with many non-LISP systems.
- Beyond Limits has the Caltech licensing rights to all commercial applications of SHINE.

== Historical and current applications of SHINE ==
- Spacecraft Health Automatic Reasoning Pilot (SHARP) for the diagnosis of telecommunication anomalies during the Neptune Voyager (VGR) Encounter.
- Galileo's (GLL) mission for diagnosing problems in the Power and Pyro Subsystem (PPS).
- Magellan's (MGN) mission for diagnosis of telecommunication anomalies in the TELECOM subsystem.
- Engineering Analysis Subsystem Environment (EASE) which is an operations environment to operate a large number of spacecraft simultaneously and increase productivity through shared resources and automation.
- Extreme Ultra Violet Explorer (EUVE) mission for labour 3 to 1 shift reductions through the use of artificial intelligence.
- Fault Induced Document Officer (FIDO) for the EUVE mission. which is an automated system that assists in expert knowledge acquisition, access and publishing capabilities for safely managing complex systems under staffing reductions and "lights out" operations.
- Stochastic Problem Obviation Tracker (SPOT) for the EUVE mission which captures and reports relevant statistical information to the user based on operations within the FIDO environment.
- The Program is licensed by Beyond Limits for use with their artificial intelligence technology.
- Under consideration by a medical company for real-time diagnosis of rectal colon cancer.
- Under consideration by a medical company for an expert system for the control of the robotic systems used in eye surgery.
