= North Star (disambiguation) =

North Star is a name of Polaris in its role as northern pole star.

North Star or North Stars may also refer to:

== Places ==
=== United States ===
- Fairbanks North Star Borough, Alaska
- North Star, California, a place in Yuba County, California
- North Star, Delaware, a census-designated place
- North Star, Minnesota, an unincorporated community
- North Star, Ohio, a village
- North Star, U.S. Virgin Islands
- North Star, Wisconsin, an unincorporated community
- North Star Township (disambiguation)

=== Elsewhere ===
- North Star, New South Wales, Australia, a village
- North Star, Alberta, Canada, a hamlet

== Transport ==
=== Air ===
- Canadair North Star, a passenger aircraft manufactured by Canadair for Trans Canada Airlines
- Custom Flight North Star, a Canadian amateur-built aircraft design
- North Star Maritime, a planned cargo airline based out of Iran

=== Rail ===
- North Star (broad gauge locomotive) (1837–1871), Star class locomotive of the Great Western Railway
- North Star (1866–1902), GWR 378 Class locomotive
- North Star (1898–1912), GWR 3031 Class locomotive renamed Bulkeley in 1906
- North Star (1906–29), GWR 4000 Class locomotive, rebuilt to 4073 Class in 1929
- North Star (1929–57), GWR 4073 Class locomotive rebuilt from the above
- North Star (Amtrak train), 1978-1985, former train route in Minnesota
- North Star (New York Central Railroad train), 1947–1962, operating New York–Cleveland with a branch to the Adirondacks
- Northstar Line, 2009-2026, former commuter train line in metropolitan Minneapolis, Minnesota

=== Road ===
- North Star, a brand of NZ Bus in Auckland, New Zealand

=== Watercraft ===
- HMS North Star, several ships in the Royal Navy
- North Star, built 1937, used by the US Navy as coastal minesweeper USS Crossbill (AMc-9)
- North Star (narrowboat), a wooden horse-drawn icebreaker built in 1868, now at the Black Country Living Museum
- North Star, a steam yacht built in 1893 as Venetia, which Cornelius Vanderbilt III bought and renamed North Star
- North Star (1897 sternwheeler), a river steamer in Montana and British Columbia
- North Star (1902 sternwheeler), a steamboat in Washington state
- North Star, built in 1966 as Marburg, an expedition ship, later renamed National Geographic Endeavour
- North Star, a roll-on/roll-off cargo ship featured in the documentary series Mighty Ships
- SS North Star, several steamships
- USCGC North Star, US Coast Guard Cutter in the Second World War
- USMS North Star III, originally Emory Victory (MCV-654), a Victory ship used in the Alaska Resupply Program
- Chinese spy ship Beijixing, a spy ship whose name translates to "North Star"

== Film ==
- North Star (1925 film), directed by Paul Powell
- The North Star (1943 film), a war film directed by Lewis Milestone
- North Star: Mark di Suvero, 1977 documentary
- The North Star (1982 film) or L'Étoile du Nord, a French film
- North Star (1996 film), an action Western directed by Nils Gaup
- The North Star (2016 film), an American film about slavery and the underground railroad
- The North Star: Finding Black Mecca, a 2021 film about Black Canadian settlements in Ontario
- North Star (2023 film), a British drama and the directorial debut of Kristin Scott Thomas

== Television ==
- North Star (TV series), an Israeli teen drama
- "North Star" (Black-ish), a 2018 episode of the American television sitcom
- "North Star" (Glenn Martin, DDS episode), an episode of Glenn Martin, DDS
- "North Star" (Star Trek: Enterprise), a third season episode of Star Trek: Enterprise

== Music ==
- The North Star (Roddy Frame album), 1998
- North Star (Curved Air album), 2014
- The North Star (Remedy Drive album), 2018
- North Star, a 2023 album by Pendragon
- "North Star", a song by Offset from the 2019 album Father of 4
- "North Star", a song from the 1979 album Exposure by Robert Fripp
- "North Star", a song by Faithless featuring Dido from the 2010 album The Dance
- "North Star", an unreleased song from the U2 360° Tour
- "North Star", a 1977 composition by Philip Glass, written for the soundtrack of the 1977 documentary
- North Star, a British record label and music group formed by members of Tottenham Mandem

== Companies and brands ==
- North Star, a brand of shoes owned by Bata Shoes
- North Star (My Little Pony), a toy animal
- North Star (Thai company), the producer of Polaris drinking water
- Beijing North Star, a conglomerate company in Beijing, China
- North Star Computers, a company established in 1976
- North Star Mine and Powerhouse, Grass Valley, California, US
- North Star Mall, a shopping center in San Antonio, Texas
- North Star Hotel, a hotel in Vancouver, Canada
- North Star Yachts, a Canadian boat builder

== Education ==
- North Star Middle School (disambiguation)
- North Star School District, Pennsylvania
- North Star Self-Directed Learning for Teens, an education center based in Sunderland, Massachusetts, US
- North Stars, nickname of St. Charles North High School, Illinois

== Sports ==
- North Star Cup, the current championship trophy of the Canadian Premier League
- North Star Shield, a former championship trophy of the Canadian Premier League used from 2019 to 2022
- Minnesota North Stars, a team in the National Hockey League between 1967 and 1993
- Île-des-Chênes North Stars, a defunct Canadian senior hockey team, 2003 Allan Cup champions
- Kildonan North Stars, a team in the Manitoba Junior Hockey League between 1976 and 1990

== Other uses ==
- The North Star (anti-slavery newspaper), published from 1847–1851 by the abolitionist Frederick Douglass
- North Star (organization), an organization for LGBT Mormons
- North Star House (Grass Valley, California), associated with the mine
- The North-Star News, a former newspaper in Oklahoma
- The North Star, an online newspaper launched in 2018 by activist Shaun King
- North Star, the name of a bell used by CF Montréal supporters to celebrate a goal, win, etc.
- North Star, the code name of the Turkish Brigade with the United Nations Command during the Korean War

== See also ==
- Étoile du Nord (train) or North Star, a former international express train in Europe
- "North Star State", nickname of the U.S. state of Minnesota
- Star of the North (disambiguation)
- Northern Star (disambiguation)
- Northstar (disambiguation)
- Estrella del norte (disambiguation) (Spanish: Star of the North)
- Estrela do Norte (disambiguation) (Portuguese: Northern Star)
- Étoile du Nord (disambiguation) (French: North Star)
- Nordstern (disambiguation) (German: Northstar)
- Nordstar (disambiguation)
- Polestar (disambiguation)
