= Estrela =

Estrela, Portuguese for "star", may refer to:

== Animals ==
- Estrela Mountain Dog, a breed of working dog native to the range
- Phyllonorycter estrela, a moth of the family Gracillariidae

== Geography ==
=== Portugal ===
- Serra da Estrela Subregion, a NUTS3 statistical subregion of Portugal
- Beiras e Serra da Estrela, an administrative division of Portugal
- Serra da Estrela, a mountain range in Portugal
- Torre (Serra da Estrela), highest point of Mainland Portugal
- Serra da Estrela Natural Park, the largest natural conservation area in Portugal
- Estrela (Lisbon), a parish located in the municipality of Lisbon, Portugal

=== Brazil ===
- Centro Oriental Rio-Grandense, one of the Mesoregions in the state of Rio Grande do Sul, Brazil

==== Alagoas ====
- Estrela de Alagoas, a municipality in the state of Alagoas, Brazil

==== Goiás state ====
- Estrela do Norte, Goiás, a municipality in north Goiás state, Brazil

==== Mato Grosso ====
- Porto Estrela, a municipality in the state of Mato Grosso, Brazil

==== Minas Gerais ====
- Estrela do Indaiá, a municipality in the state of Minas Gerais, Brazil
- Estrela Dalva, a municipality in the state of Minas Gerais, Brazil
- Estrela do Sul, a municipality the state of Minas Gerais, Brazil

==== Rio Grande do Sul ====
- Estrela, Rio Grande do Sul, a municipality in Brazil
- Estrela Velha, a municipality in the state Rio Grande do Sul, Brazil

==== São Paulo ====
- Estrela d'Oeste, a municipality in the state of São Paulo, Brazil
- Mira Estrela, a municipality in the state of São Paulo, Brazil
- Estrela do Norte, São Paulo, a municipality in the state of São Paulo, Brazil

== People ==
=== Footballers ===
- Estrela (footballer) (born 1995), Angolan footballer born Valdomiro Lameira
- Elaine Estrela Moura, Brazilian international woman's football player
- Wilson Constantino Novo Estrela, Angolan retired footballer
- Nélson Alexandre Farpelha Estrela, Portuguese footballer

=== Other ===
- Edite Estrela (born 1949), Portuguese socialist politician and Member of the European Parliament

== Sports clubs ==
- Estrela do Norte Futebol Clube, a Brazilian football (soccer) club
- Estrela de Cantanhez FC, a Guinea-Bissau football team
- Estrela dos Amadores, a Cabo Verdean football team
- Estrela Negra de Bissau, a Guinea-Bissau football team
- Estrela Miyazaki, a former Japanese football club based in Miyazaki
- GD Estrela Vermelha, a sports club in Maputo, Mozambique
- Estrela Clube Primeiro de Maio, a football (soccer) club from Benguela, Angola
- Estrela de Vendas Novas, a sports club from Vendas Novas, Évora, Portugal
- Estrela Vermelha (Beira), a Mozambique multi sports club from Beira, Mozambique
- Estrela do Norte Futebol Clube, a Brazilian football club based in Cachoeiro do Itapemirim, Espírito Santo state

== Other ==
- Muito (Dentro da Estrela Azulada), an album by Brazilian singer and composer Caetano Veloso
- Estrela, part of the Uma Estrela Misteriosa Revelará o Segredo project by Nando Reis
- Arena das Dunas, a football stadium in Natal, Brazil
- Estrela (company), a Brazilian toy manufacturer
- Estrela Basilica, a basilica in Lisbon, Portugal
- Escola Catolica Estrela do Mar (Macau) a Catholic school in Macau
- Serra da Estrela cheese, a cheese from Serra da Estrela in Portugal with PDO status
- Estrela de absinto, a Portuguese-language novel by Brazilian author Oswald de Andrade
- Telstar 14 or Estrela do Sul 1, a commercial communications satellite
- Estrela report, a failed EU resolution on women's health and reproductive rights proposed by Edite Estrela

== See also ==
- Estrella (disambiguation)
