= Pendragon discography =

This is the discography of English rock band Pendragon.

== Albums ==
Title	Album details	Peak chart positions	
Title	Album details	POL	UK
The Jewel	Released: 19 August 1985; Label: Elusive Records; Formats: CD, LP, CS, digital download	—	—
Kowtow	Released: 1988; Label: Toff Records; Formats: CD, LP, CS, digital download	—	—
The World	Released: 11 November 1991; Label: Toff Records; Formats: CD, LP, CS	—	—
The Window of Life	Released: 8 November 1993; Label: Toff Records; Formats: CD, LP, digital download	—	—
The Masquerade Overture	Released: 25 March 1996; Label: Toff Records; Formats: CD, LP, digital download	—	113
Not of This World	Released: 12 June 2001; Label: Toff Records; Formats: CD, digital download	29	—
Believe	Released: 18 October 2005; Label: Toff Records; Formats: CD, digital download	48	—
Pure	Released: 1 October 2008; Label: Toff Records, Mad Fish; Formats: CD, CD+DVD, LP, digital download	—	—
Passion	Released: 19 April 2011; Label: Snapper Music, Mad Fish; Formats: CD, CD+DVD, LP, digital download	47	—
Men Who Climb Mountains	Released: October 2014; Label: Snapper Music, Mad Fish; Formats: CD, digital download	—	—
Love Over Fear	Released: 8 February 2020; Label: Toff Records; Formats: CD, LP, Deluxe edition (3 CDs), digital download	—	—
Fallen Dreams and Angels and All the Loose Ends	Released: 2022; Label: Toff Records; Formats: CD, LP	—	—
"—" denotes a recording that did not chart or was not released in that territory.

== Live albums ==
Title	Album details
9:15 Live	Released: 1986; Label: EMI; Formats: CD
The Very, Very Bootleg	Released: 1993; Label: Toff Records; Formats: CD
Utrecht... The Final Frontier	Released: 28 October 1996; Label: Toff Records; Formats: CD
Live In Krakow 1996	Released: 1997; Label: Toff Records; Formats: CD
Acoustically Challenged	Released: 22 April 2002; Label: Metal Mind Productions; Formats: CD
Out of Order Comes Chaos	Released: 25 February 2013; Label: Metal Mind Productions; Formats: CD
Masquerade 20	Released: 7 April 2017; Label: Metal Mind Productions; Formats: CD

== Video albums ==
Title	Video details
Live at Last... And More	Released: 14 May 2002; Label: Metal Mind Productions; Formats: DVD
And Now Everybody to the Stage	Released: 31 October 2006; Label: Metal Mind Productions; Formats: DVD+CD
Past and Presence	Released: 16 April 2007; Label: Metal Mind Productions; Formats: DVD
Concerto Maximo	Released: 23 February 2009; Label: Metal Mind Productions; Formats: DVD+CD
Out of Order Comes Chaos	Released: 17 September 2012; Label: Metal Mind Productions; Formats: DVD, Blu-ray
Masquerade 20	Released: 7 April 2017; Label: Metal Mind Productions; Formats: DVD, DVD+CD

== Mini-albums ==
Title	Album details
Fly High, Fall Far	Released: 16 January 1984; Label: Elusive Records; Formats: LP
Red Shoes	Released: 1987; Label: Awareness Records; Formats: LP
Saved by You	Released: 1989; Label: Toff Records; Formats: CD, LP
Fallen Dreams And Angels	Released: 26 April 1994; Label: Toff Records; Formats: CD
As Good As Gold	Released: 17 April 1996; Label: Toff Records; Formats: CD
North Star	Released: 1 June 2023; Formats: CD, digital download

== Compilations albums ==
Title	Album details
The R(B)est of Pendragon	Released: 21 October 1991; Label: Toff Records; Formats: CD
Overture 1984 - 1996	Released: 1998; Label: Outer Music; Formats: CD
Once Upon a Time in England Volume 1 & 2	Released: 1999; Label: Toff Records; Formats: CD
The History: 1984 - 2000	Released: 6 March 2000; Label: Metal Mind Productions; Formats: CD
Introducing Pendragon	Released: 22 April 2013; Label: Snapper Music; Formats: CD
The First 40 Years	Released: 30 Sept 2019; Label: Toff Records; Formats: CD
