= Nordstern =

Nordstern is the German word meaning "North Star", referring to Polaris.

It may also refer to:

== Places ==
- Nordstern (city), planned German metropolis in Nazi-occupied Norway during World War II.
- Nordstern (club), nightclub in Basel, Switzerland.
- Nordsternpark, park in Gelsenkirchen, Germany.
- Villa Nordstern, villa in Lehrte, near Hannover, Germany.

== Companies ==
- Der Nordstern, former German-language newspaper (1874-1931) published in Minnesota, United States.
- Nordstern AG, former company now part of Frosta AG frozen foods in Bremerhaven, Germany.
- Nordstern (company), former German insurance company now part of AXA group.

== Sport ==
- BFC Nordstern, former German association football club from Berlin, Germany.
- FC Nordstern Basel, football club from Basel, Switzerland.
- FC Nordstern 1896 München, former German association football club from Munich, Bavaria.

== Transport ==
- Nordstern, name of the third Blohm & Voss Ha 139 all-metal inverted gull wing floatplane.
- KNFB Nordstern, name of an Austrian steam locomotive.
- Zeppelin LZ 121 Nordstern, a passenger airship in 1920's Germany.

== Other uses ==
- Nordstern (typeface)

== See also ==
- Nord (disambiguation)
- Stern (disambiguation)
- Nordstar (disambiguation)
- Northstar (disambiguation)
- North Star (disambiguation)
- Northern Star (disambiguation)
- Star of the North (disambiguation)
- Étoile du Nord (disambiguation) (French: North Star)
- Estrela do Norte (disambiguation) (Portuguese: Northern Star)
- Estrella del norte (disambiguation) (Spanish: Star of the North)
