= Étoile du Nord =

Étoile du Nord (French for Star of the North, i.e. the North Star) may refer to:

- L'Étoile du Nord, the motto of the U.S. state of Minnesota
- L'étoile du nord, an 1854 opéra comique in three acts by Giacomo Meyerbeer
- "L'Étoile du Nord", a short story by the francophone Belgian writer Georges Simenon
- L'Étoile du Nord (film), a 1982 French film directed by Pierre Granier-Deferre and based on the short story by Georges Simenon
- Étoile du Nord (train), which ran between Paris, Brussels and Amsterdam
- LGV Étoile du Nord, former name of a proposed high-speed rail line now known as LGV Picardie
- Theâtre de l'Étoile du Nord, a theatre in the centre of Tunis, Tunisia
- Etoile De Nord, a 19th-century racehorse sired by The Baron

== See also ==
- Nord (disambiguation)
- Étoile (disambiguation)
- Polestar (disambiguation)
- Nordstar (disambiguation)
- Nordstern (disambiguation) (German: Northstar)
- Northstar (disambiguation)
- North Star (disambiguation)
- Northern Star (disambiguation)
- Star of the North (disambiguation)
- Estrela do Norte (disambiguation) (Portuguese: Northern Star)
- Estrella del norte (disambiguation) (Spanish: Star of the North)
