= Estrella del norte =

Estrella del norte (Spanish: Star of the North), estrella norte (Spanish: Northern Star), or, variation, may refer to:

== Places ==
- Karapaí, Amambay, Paraguay; a municipality nicknamed "Estrella del Norte"

=== Facilities and structures ===
- Estrella del Norte, Olanchito, Honduras; a secondary school
- Estrella del Norte, Metro Manila, Philippines; a shopping mall, see List of shopping malls in Metro Manila
- La Estrella del Norte, Manila, Philippines; a demolished Art Deco building, see List of Art Deco architecture in Asia
- Estrella del Norte, Manila, Philippines; a department store destroyed in WWII, see Department stores by country
- Estrella del Norte, Villa Muñoz, Montevideo, Uruguay; a women's prison
- La Estrella del Norte, Playas, New Mexico, USA; a landmark in the Playas CDP

== Arts, entertainment, media ==
=== Newspapers ===
- La Estrella Norte, a Spanish-language newspaper based in Mayagüez, Puerto Rico, USA
- La Estrella del Norte, a newspaper founded in Antofagasta in 1966 in Chile

=== Songs ===
- "Estrella del norte" (song), a 1987 song by Mango off the album Adesso
- "Estrella del norte" (song), a folksong written by Manuel Ponce

== Other uses ==
- Estrella del Norte, an Argentinian train service run by the Central Argentine Railway
  - Estrella del Norte train accident in 1978 in Sa Pereira, Argentina
- Estrella del Norte, a soccer team located in Amambay, Paraguay; see List of football clubs in Paraguay

== See also ==
- Norte (disambiguation)
- Estrella (disambiguation)
- Estrela do Norte (disambiguation) (Portuguese: Northern Star)
- Étoile du Nord (disambiguation) (French: North Star)
- Nordstern (disambiguation) (German: Northstar)
- Nordstar (disambiguation)
- Northstar (disambiguation)
- North Star (disambiguation)
- Northern Star (disambiguation)
- Star of the North (disambiguation)
