= Estrela do Norte =

Estrela do Norte (Portuguese: Star of the North) or variant, may refer to:

== Places ==
- Estrela do Norte, São Paulo, a municipality in the state of São Paulo, Brazil
- Estrela do Norte, Goiás, a municipality in the state of Goiás, Brazil

== Ships ==
- Estrella Do Norte, a Mersey-class trawler
- Estrella do norte, a Portuguese ship wrecked on a North Sea sandbank in 1815; see List of shipwrecks in 1815

== Other uses ==
- Estrela do Norte Futebol Clube, Cachoeiro do Itapemirim, Espírito Santo state, Brazil

== See also ==
- Estrela do Sul
- Norte (disambiguation)
- Estrela (disambiguation)
- Estrella del norte (disambiguation) (Spanish: Star of the North)
- Étoile du Nord (disambiguation) (French: North Star)
- Nordstern (disambiguation) (German: Northstar)
- Nordstar (disambiguation)
- Northstar (disambiguation)
- North Star (disambiguation)
- Northern Star (disambiguation)
- Star of the North (disambiguation)
