= Henry McPetrie =

Australian rules footballer

Personal information
- Full name: Henry James Watson McPetrie
- Born: 14 March 1877; Glasgow, Scotland
- Died: 1 November 1937 (aged 60); Castlemaine, Victoria
- Original team: Richmond City
- Position: Forward

Playing career^{1}
Years	Club	Games (Goals)
1894	Richmond City	
1895	St Kilda (VFA)	3 (1)
1896	West Beach	
1897	Carlton (VFL)	5 (2)
- ^{1} Playing statistics correct to the end of 1897.

Henry James Watson McPetrie (14 March 1877 – 1 November 1937) was an Australian rules footballer who played for the St Kilda Football Club in the Victorian Football Association (VFA) and the Carlton Football Club in the Victorian Football League (VFL).

== Family ==
The son of the Master mariner, Captain Alexander McPetrie (1840-1892), — who was in command of the iron-hulled clipper ship, Ben Voirlich, when it set the record of 64 days between Plymouth and Port Phillip in January 1875 — and Elizabeth Simpson Petrie (1850-1915), née Mathieson, Henry James Watson McPetrie was born in Glasgow, Scotland on 14 March 1877.

One of his brothers, William Martin McPetrie (1880–1951) played cricket for Victoria.

== Football ==
=== St Kilda (VFA) ===
Recruited from Richmond City, he played in 3 games (1 goal) for St Kilda in the 1895 VFA competition.

=== West Beach ===
He played for the West Beach Football Club, in the St Kilda District, in 1896.

=== Carlton (VFL) ===
Recruited from West Beach, he played in 5 games for Carlton, in 1897, the first year of the VFL competition, and played against Fitzroy, at the Brunswick Street Oval, on 8 May 1897, Carlton's first game in the VFL.

== Death ==
He died (suddenly) at Castlemaine, Victoria on 1 November 1937.
