= William McPetrie =

Australian cricketer

Personal information
- Full name: William Martin McPetrie
- Born: 15 February 1880; Port Melbourne, Australia
- Died: 30 June 1951 (aged 71); Hawthorn, Victoria

Domestic team information
- Years: Team
- 1905: Victoria
- Source: Cricinfo, 15 November 2015

William Martin McPetrie (15 February 1880 – 30 June 1951) was an Australian cricketer. He played two first-class cricket matches for Victoria in 1905.

== Family ==
The son of the Master mariner, Captain Alexander McPetrie (1840-1892), — who was in command of the iron-hulled clipper ship, Ben Voirlich, when it set the record of 64 days between Plymouth and Port Phillip in January 1875 — and Elizabeth Simpson Petrie (1850-1915), née Mathieson, Henry James Watson McPetrie was born in Port Melbourne on 15 February 1880.

One of his brothers, Henry James Watson McPetrie (1877–1937), played Australian rules football for the St Kilda Football Club in the Victorian Football Association (VFA) and for the Carlton Football Club in the Victorian Football League (VFL).

== Military service ==
He enlisted in the First AIF, in May 1916, served overseas, and returned to Australia in May 1918.

== Death ==
He died at the Allendale Private Hospital, in Hawthorn, Victoria, on 30 June 1951.

== See also ==
- List of Victoria first-class cricketers
