= Noel Stephen Paynter =

Royal Air Force officer (1898–1998)

- Born: 26 December 1898; Chelmsford, Essex, England
- Died: 16 March 1998 (aged 99)
- Military career
- Allegiance: United Kingdom
- Branch: British Army; Royal Air Force
- Rank: Air Commodore
- Nickname: Peter
- Commands: No. 28 Squadron RAF
- Conflicts: First World War; North-West Frontier; Second World War
- Awards: Companion of the Order of the Bath; Order of Saint Anna (Russia)
- Other work: MI5

Air Commodore Noel Stephen "Peter" Paynter, CB (26 December 1898 – 16 March 1998) was a Royal Air Force officer who served as chief intelligence officer of Bomber Command. Paynter was a senior member of the team that ran Bomber Command under its formidable commander-in-chief, Air Chief Marshal Sir Arthur Harris, throughout the last three years of the Second World War. His reports, as head of intelligence, lay behind many of the raids on German cities, which remain the subject of controversy. Paynter insisted to the end that reliable sources had led them to believe that the Nazis had hidden large munitions stores in such historic towns as Dresden; Hitler thought that the Allies would not attack them.

== Family ==
Noel Stephen Paynter had been born in Essex where his father, Canon F S Paynter, was rector of Springfield. But the family has a long history in West Cornwall, with a coat of arms dating from the 16th century and a place in Burke's Landed Gentry. He married Barbara Grace, daughter of artist Fredereick Hans Haagensen of London. They had two children, Francis and Rosemary. His brother Charles Theodore Paynter (Lieutenant, R.N.) was killed in HMS North Star when it was sunk in 1918 by coastal artillery near Zeebrugge.

== Military career ==
Paynter had been carefully chosen for the post in 1942 after spending the previous three years as head of RAF Intelligence in the Middle East – for which he had been mentioned in dispatches. He was to establish a close working relationship with his new chief, reflected in a painting by Herbert Arnould Olivier, now hanging in the office of the C-in-C RAF Strike Command, which shows Harris sitting at his desk with Paynter leaning across it at a briefing session. His loyalty to Bomber Harris, however, was evidenced more dramatically after the war, when Paynter was director of intelligence at the Air Ministry. Incensed by the Attlee Government's refusal to give Harris a place in the victory celebrations, he resigned his commission in protest. His decision meant losing £100 from his annual pension – a more significant sacrifice then than it sounds today. He was soon found a new job, however, as a director of MI5, and remained a senior officer with the Security Service until retiring at the age of 62 in the early 1960s.

Paynter acquired the nickname 'Peter' while at Haileybury — and was never known by any other name thereafter. He went from school to the Royal Military College, Sandhurst, from where he was commissioned briefly into the Essex Regiment before being transferred to the Royal Flying Corps.

Paynter served as a young pilot on the Western front in the later stages of the First World War, then took part in the expedition to Russia in the turmoil following the Bolshevik Revolution. He never forgot the atrocities which were being committed by both the Red and White Russian armies on hapless civilians. But he brought back a White Russian decoration: the Order of Saint Anna, awarded following a plane crash in which he dragged his co-pilot to safety. The First World War also left him with the legacy of two chunks of shrapnel, which remained in his body until he died.

Paynter spent much of the 1920s as a pilot in the North-West Frontier Province of India. Then after four years at RAF Halton, he switched to air intelligence, a transfer of interest which was to shape the rest of his career. He went to Malta in 1934, returned to the Directorate of Intelligence at the Air Ministry, then left for Cairo in 1939. He was appointed Companion of the Order of the Bath after the war. On retiring from MI5 to his home in rural Buckinghamshire, Peter Paynter entered the public life of his adopted county. He became at various times chairman.
