= SS North Star =

SS North Star is the name of the following ships:

- SS North Star (1853), a yacht built for Cornelius Vanderbilt, later used as a mail ship and as a transport during the American Civil War, scrapped in 1866
- SS North Star (1889), sank 25 November 1908
- SS North Star (1937), launched in 1930 as Prince Henry, served in the Royal Canadian Navy during WWII, later renamed Empire Parkeston and scrapped in 1962

== See also ==
- HMS North Star
- USCGC North Star
- North Star (disambiguation)
