= Northern Star =

Northern star is a term for the star Polaris.

Northern star(s) may also refer to:

== Books and newspapers ==
- The Northern Star, a newspaper in Lismore, New South Wales, Australia
- Northern Star, a South Australian newspaper that became The Kapunda Herald
- Northern Star (Chartist newspaper), 1837–1852
- Northern Star (Northern Illinois University), a student newspaper
- Northern Star (newspaper of the Society of United Irishmen), 1792–1797
- Northern Stars: The Anthology of Canadian Science Fiction, a 2017 anthology edited by David G. Hartwell

== Music ==
- Northern Star Records, a UK based record label
- Northern Star Tour, a 2000 concert tour by Melanie C

=== Albums ===
- Northern Star (Groove Armada album), released in 1998
- Northern Star (Melanie C album), released in 1999

=== Songs ===
- "Northern Star" (song), a song by Melanie C, 1999
- "Northern Star", a song from Hole's 1998 album Celebrity Skin
- "Northern Star", a song by Canadian singer Michel Pagliaro
- "Northern Star", a song from The Amazons 2022 album, How Will I Know if Heaven Will Find Me?

== Plays ==
- Northern Star, a 1984 play by Stewart Parker
- A Northern Star, a play by the Barefoot Theatre Company

== Sports ==
- Northern Stars, a New Zealand netball team
- Northern Stars, an Israeli Football League team
- Northern Stars, an early African-Canadian baseball nine
- TDC Northern Stars, a former UK ice hockey team

== Transportation ==
- MS Celtic Star, a ferry in service as the MS Northern Star with P&O Irish Sea and Dart Line from 2002–2004
- SS Empire Caribou, an American Star Lines Inc. cargo ship in service as the SS Northern Star from 1920–1923
- SS Northern Star, a Shaw-Savill liner operating on the UK–Australasia route (1962–1974)

== Other uses ==
- Northern Star Resources, Australian mining company
- "The Northern Star" (Daredevil: Born Again), an episode of Daredevil: Born Again

== See also ==
- Estrella del norte (disambiguation) (Spanish: Star of the North)
- Estrela do Norte (disambiguation) (Portuguese: Northern Star)
- Étoile du Nord (disambiguation) (French: North Star)
- Nordstar (disambiguation)
- Nordstern (disambiguation) (German: Northstar)
- North Star (disambiguation)
- Northstar (disambiguation)
- Star (disambiguation)
- Star of the North (disambiguation)
