= Star of the North =

Star of the North may refer to:

== Places ==
- Polaris, the star
- Star of the North Secondary Charter School, Fairbanks North Star Borough School District, Fairbanks, Alaska, USA
- Star of the North Inn, Old New England Highway, Liddell, Singleton Council, New South Wales, Australia; former name of the Chain of Ponds Inn

== People ==
- Star of the North, a nickname of Catherine the Great (1729–1796), Tsarina of Russia
- The Star of the North, a nickname of George Gilfillan (1813–1878), Scottish writer
- Star of the North, a nickname of William Nicolson (1655–1727), English clergyman

== Entertainment ==
- Star of the North (film) a 1914 U.S. silent film
- Airhawk (film), a 1981 Australian telefilm also released as "Star of the North"
- Star of the North (book), a novel by Anna Jacobs

== Ships ==
- Star of the North, a British ship that ran aground off Norfolk
- Star of the North, a British ship that wrecked off Greece
- Star of the North, a U.S. ship that sank in Michigan
- Star of the North, a British steam trawler built by Hall, Russell & Company

== Other uses ==
- Order of the Star of the North, a Swedish chivalric order
- "Star of the North", the motto for the 205th Infantry Brigade (United States)
- "Star of the North", a symbol of Minnesota
- Star of the North Games, the Minnesota State Games, part of the National Congress of State Games
- Latający Wilnianin, a Polish train service also called "Star of the North"

== See also ==
- Star (disambiguation)
- North (disambiguation)
- Estrella del norte (disambiguation) (Spanish: Star of the North)
- Estrela do Norte (disambiguation) (Portuguese: Northern Star)
- Étoile du Nord (disambiguation) (French: North Star)
- Nordstern (disambiguation) (German: Northstar)
- Nordstar (disambiguation)
- Northstar (disambiguation)
- North Star (disambiguation)
- Northern Star (disambiguation)
