= Steamboats of the Columbia River, Wenatchee Reach =

Confluence of the Wenatchee

Steamboats operated on the Wenatchee Reach of the Columbia River from the late 1880s to 1915. The main base of operations was Wenatchee, Washington, located at the confluence of the Wenatchee and Columbia Rivers, 465 miles (748 km) from the mouth of the river. Operations were mainly between Wenatchee and Bridgeport. Rapids below Wenatchee and above Bridgeport prevented safe navigation.

== Economic background ==
By the first decade of the 20th century wheat farming had expanded into Douglas County's "Big Bend" region of the Columbia near Bridgeport, and the valleys of the Okanogan, Methow, Chelan, and Entiat rivers were rapidly developing. The Great Northern Railway was completed to Wenatchee and west to Puget Sound by 1893, making it became profitable for crops to be shipped down the Columbia to Wenatchee's rail link.

== No complete open river ==
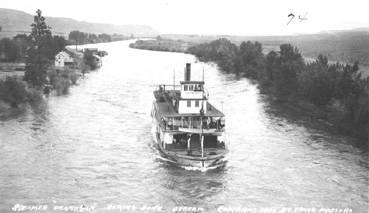
Okanogan coming downstream on the Okanogan River, circa 1910

Prior to the construction of dams, open navigability was never established throughout the Columbia. This was an important difference from the Mississippi-Ohio River system, which in the right season, and with a canal around the Falls of the Ohio, was navigable from New Orleans to Pittsburgh, an enormous distance. By contrast, no steamboat could ever ascend or descend the entire route of the Columbia, although the nature of the river was that even far inland, such as at Arrow and Kootenay Lakes, vast areas remained navigable, but separated by rapids and shoals from the rest of the river.

The rapids and shoals separating the Wenatchee Reach from the lower Columbia were practically unnavigable, although Captain William Gray did try to establish a steamboat route up the river by taking City of Ellensburg up through Priest and Rock Islands Rapids, with the aid of a cable anchored to the bank and then wrapped around the capstan. The boat, and one other, Thomas L. Nixon, (this one lined up over the rapids) operated above Wenatchee for a while as the only two boats on that stretch of the river.

== Steamboat operations on Wenatchee Reach ==
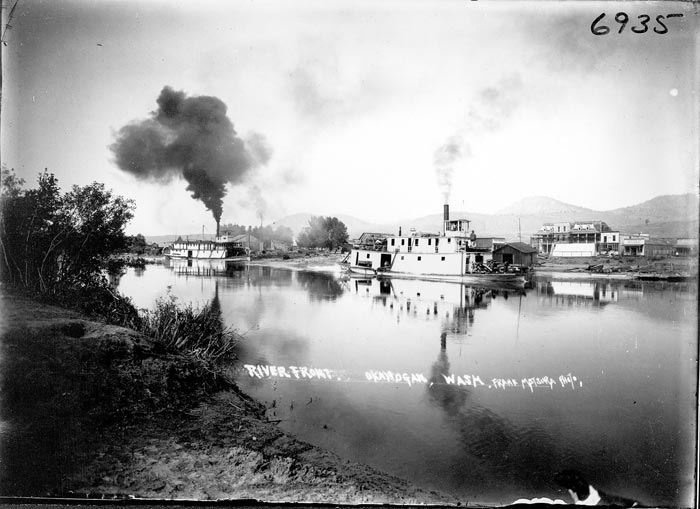
Steamboats at wharf at Okanogan, Washington, May 1909

From about 1891 to 1915, steamboats operated on the far inland Columbia river out of Wenatchee, Washington, a part of the river which this article will refer to as the Wenatchee Reach. Navigation was never continuous from the Wenatchee Reach to the downriver parts of the Columbia. See Steamboats of the Columbia River for a discussion of the boats operating on the lower routes.

=== Establishment of operations ===
By the 1890s the railroad had reached Wenatchee, but there was no transportation any further up the Columbia from there. Alexander Griggs, an experienced Mississippi River steamboat captain, arrived in Wenatchee in about 1891, and in 1893 he organized the Columbia and Okanogan Steamboat Company to navigate the 70-mile (110 km) stretch from Wenatchee to the mouth of the Okanogan River.

=== Navigation difficulties ===
The Corps of Engineers had blasted out some of the larger rocks in the river and removed some snags. At critical places at various rapids the Corps had installed huge ringbolts set in the rocks beside the river, so a steamboat could hook up a cable to these bolts, wrap the end around a steam-powered winch on board, and literally crank its way up the rapids. Horse drawn tow paths alongside the river were also employed.

=== Boats on the route ===
Eventually Captain Griggs put eight or nine boats on the route, including Alexander Griggs, W.H. Pringle, Selkirk, Gerone, Columbia, Oro, Camano, North Star, Chelan, and Okanogan. The first three boats were lost in rapids, Griggs and Pringle at Entiat, and Selkirk at Rock Island.

=== Decline and end of steamboat service ===
The last four boats were laid up about 1910 for lack of business, (and competition from the Great Northern Railway branch that had been laid north to Oroville) and later burned all at once in a spectacular blaze while moored at Wenatchee on July 8, 1915. None of the vessels burned was insured, and the company's last boat, Enterprise, sank just four days later, on July 12, 1915, at Brewster's Landing.

Another boat on the route, St. Paul, not owned by C&OSN, burned the same year, leaving only Del Rio and Robert Young, and later, in 1917, Bridgeport, which continued steamboat operations on the routes above Wenatchee into the mid-1920s.
