= Okanogan Steamboat Company =

The Okanogan Steamboat Company was a shipping company that ran steamboats on the Columbia River above Wenatchee, Washington from the late 19th century to 1915.

Its steamboats included Pringle, Chelan, and North Star.

== See also ==
Steamboats of Columbia River, Wenatchee Reach
