= Concerto Maximo =

Live album by Pendragon
- Released: 2009
- Recorded: October 13, 2008 - Katowice, Poland
- Genre: Progressive rock
- Label: Toff Records
- Producer: Metal Mind Productions

Pendragon chronology
Pure (2008)	Concerto Maximo (2009)

Concerto Maximo is a live album by the British progressive rock band Pendragon, released in 2009, recorded in Katowice, on October 13, 2008. It was filmed and edited by Metal Mind. It was released in several versions - a 2 CD release, featuring just the audio from the show, a DVD, featuring the full show, and a DVD and 2 CD special edition, which was limited to 1000 copies.

So, 2008 was the 30th Anniversary of Pendragon....they said we wouldn't make it....they were wrong! Not only have we made it but it seems we have made a most relevant album this year, namely Pure. This DVD was filmed at the Teatr Slaski in Katowice Poland, which was part of a 30 date European jaunt to promote the new album Pure, even though there are only 3 songs which is about 20 minutes of material from the Pure album on this DVD.....yes we did want to play Indigo as well, but with 4 hours of material to learn for our Megadaze [UK convention] and Peel To The Power of 2 shows, we never got to rehearse it. We also had to work out all the parts for Pure as we were finishing the recording and mixing off in July. However we did want to film and record material that hadn't appeared on the other DVDs, but when we tried the proposed set list for the DVD in Bielsko, it didn't quite gel together and we felt missed a few classics, so we decided to make this a really huge 3 hour DVD, and add some of the crowd favourites as well, like Spell and Masters, besides you have never heard these songs with Scotty on......I don't think you're going to be disappointed!"

— Nick Barret

== Track listing ==
These track lengths are from the CD version of the album. Several of the tracks were shortened or changed; The Walls Of Babylon did not feature the slow introduction, The Wishing Well did not include the first part, "For Your Journey", and The Voyager started from the first riff. A few songs are lengthened, including Nostradamus, in which the band was introduced, and the guitar solo and finale was extended for Masters Of Illusion.

CD 1

1. "The Walls Of Babylon" - 5:05
2. "A Man of Nomadic Traits" - 11:32
3. "The Wishing Well" - 17:41
4. "Eraserhead" - 8:40
5. "Total Recall" - 5:56
6. "Nostradamus" - 5:31
7. "Learning Curve" - 7:19
8. "Breaking The Spell" - 8:30
9. "Sister Bluebird" - 7:54

CD 2

1. "The Shadow" - 9:07
2. "The Freak Show" - 4:11
3. "The Voyager" - 11:05
4. "It's Only Me" - 8:00
5. "Masters of Illusion" - 12:45
6. "The King of the Castle" - 4:53
7. "And We'll Go Hunting Deer" - 5:11
8. "Queen of Hearts" - 19:55
