= Nordstar =

Nordstar or variant, may refer to:

- NordStar (НордСтар), a Russian airline based in Norilsk, Russia
- Nordstar Tower (Нордстар Тауэр), a skyscraper in Moscow, Russia
- NordStar Capital, a private equity firm which owns the TorStar group, parent of the newspaper Toronto Star

== See also ==
- Nord (disambiguation)
- Star (disambiguation)
- Estrella del norte (disambiguation) (Spanish: Star of the North)
- Estrela do Norte (disambiguation) (Portuguese: Northern Star)
- Étoile du Nord (disambiguation) (French: North Star)
- Nordstern (disambiguation) (German: Northstar)
- Northstar (disambiguation)
- North Star (disambiguation)
- Northern Star (disambiguation)
- Star of the North (disambiguation)
