= Balm in Gilead =

Play written by Lanford Wilson

Balm in Gilead is a 1965 American play written by American playwright Lanford Wilson.

== Dramatic structure ==
Wilson's first full-length play, Balm in Gilead centers on a café frequented by heroin addicts, prostitutes, and thieves. It features many unconventional theatrical devices, such as overlapping dialogue, simultaneous scenes, and unsympathetic lead characters. The plot draws a parallel between the amoral and criminal activity that the characters engage in to provide temporary escape from their boredom and suffering, and the two main characters' becoming a couple in an attempt to start a new life together.

The play takes its title from "There Is a Balm in Gilead", a traditional African American spiritual, related to Balm of Gilead, a perfume that is referred to in the Old Testament (Book of Jeremiah, chapter 46, verse 11).

== Production history ==
Wilson wrote the play while living in New York City, finding inspiration by sitting in cafés and eavesdropping. He approached Marshall W. Mason, whom he knew from the Caffe Cino, to direct the production. After being workshopped in the directing and playwriting units of the Actors Studio, it debuted off-off-Broadway at La Mama Experimental Theater Club on January 20, 1965. It was a critical and commercial success, and was the first full-length play to be produced off-off-Broadway. Wilson said that he wrote the play partially because he wanted "to break out of the physical limitations inherent in writing a play for the Cino". It also became the first off-off-Broadway play to be published (by Hill and Wang).

The first Steppenwolf Theatre Company production ran from September 18 to October 16, 1980, and was directed by John Malkovich. A production co-produced by the Circle Repertory Company and Steppenwolf ran Off-Broadway from May 31, 1984 to January 6, 1985 at the Circle Repertory Theatre. Directed once again by Malkovich, the 1984 cast featured Jonathan Hogan, Danton Stone, Laurie Metcalf, Gary Sinise, Giancarlo Esposito, and Glenne Headly. Metcalf was praised for her performance as Darlene, particularly for her 20-minute monologue in the play's second act.

In 2005, the play was revived by the Barefoot Theatre Company at the Sargeant Theater in New York City under the direction of Eric Nightengale, who had assisted Malkovich in the 1984 revival. The 2005 revival starred Anna Chlumsky and Francisco Solorzano, and featured Victoria Malvagno, Luca Pierruci, Jennie West, John Gazzale, Trey Gibbons, Jeff Keilholtz, and Diego Kelman Ajuz.

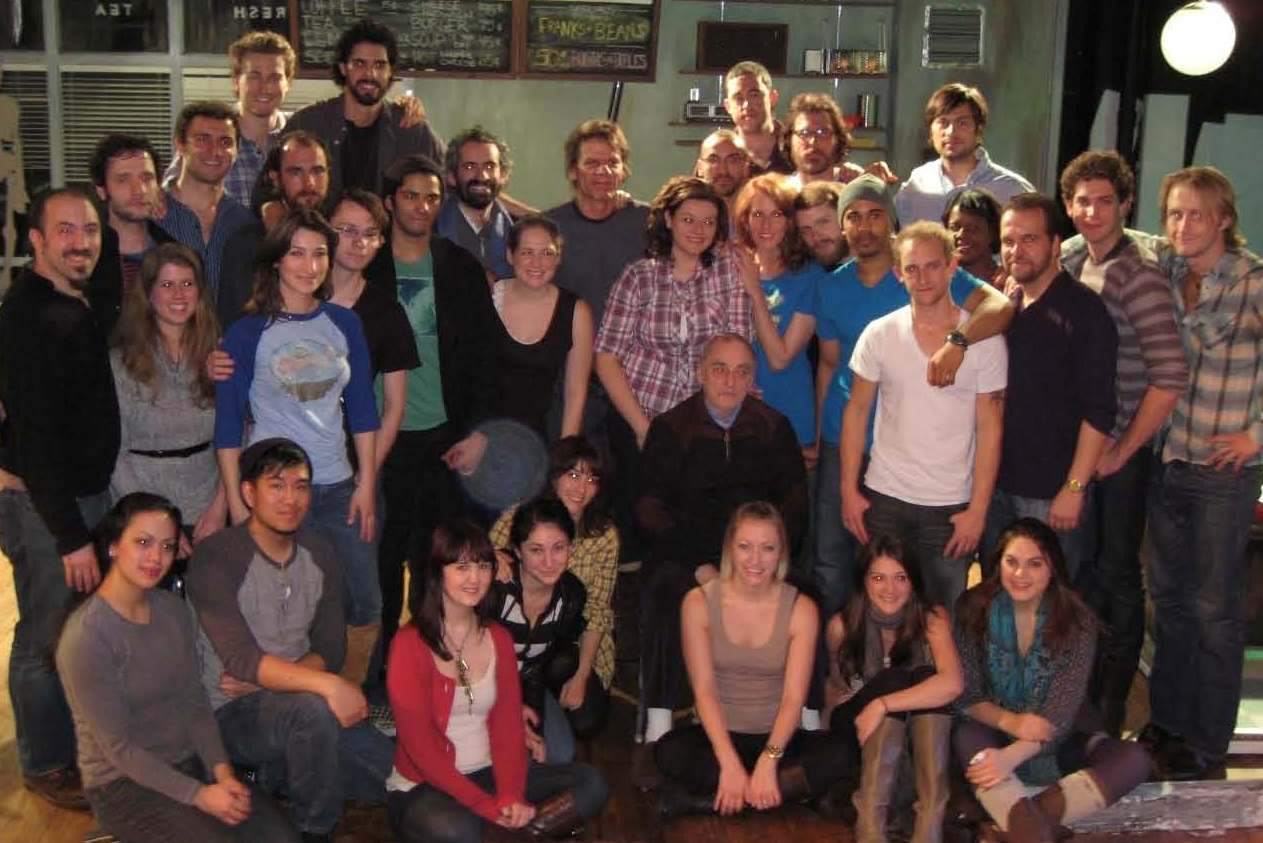
T. Schreiber Studio's company of Balm in Gilead, with playwright Lanford Wilson (seated center)

In 2010, the play returned to off-off Broadway in a revival by the T. Schreiber Studio company. The revival, under the direction of associate artistic director, Peter Jensen, experienced widespread critical and audience acclaim. This included recognition from Backstage for the ensemble as one of the magazine's favorite performances of 2010-2011. The response throughout the off-off-Broadway community resulted in two extensions of the initial six-week run, with the production ending after nine weeks on December 18, 2010. The revival played to sold-out houses for every show throughout the entire run. Wilson attended the production on December 12, 2010, summing up his thoughts on the production by calling it "a thrill to see". This was the final production of his own work that Wilson would see before his death in March 2011.

In September 2011, the 2010 revival received six New York Innovative Theatre Awards nominations for off-off Broadway productions, including for Actress in a Lead Role (Jill Bianchini and Belle Caplis), Ensemble, Costume Design (Anne Wingate), and Sound Design (Andy Cohen). The production won the award for Outstanding Production of a Play.

== Plot summary ==
Balm in Gilead is set in Frank's café, a greasy spoon diner in New York City's Upper Broadway neighborhood, over the course of three days. The plot loosely centers on Joe, a cynical drug dealer, and Darlene, a naïve new arrival to the city. Joe and Darlene spend the night together hours after meeting, but he soon pushes her away, overwhelmed by his debt to a local kingpin named Chuckles. Meanwhile, Darlene finds herself ill-equipped to handle life in a slum, and she becomes increasingly vulnerable to the attentions of the various low-rent men who hang around the café looking for an easy target.

Joe sees in Darlene a chance for a fresh start, and briefly considers giving up dealing. Just as he is about to return Chuckles' money, however, he is killed by one of the dealer's thugs. The play ends with all the lead characters droning their lines from the first scene over and over again in a circle, implying that their lives are stuck in a demoralizing rut.

== Characters ==
- Joe, a small-time drug dealer looking to go into business with Chuckles, the local kingpin
- Darlene, a naïve young woman newly arrived to New York City
- Dopey, an older junkie
- Fick, a pathetic, childlike junkie
- Ann, a prostitute
- John, the café's manager
- Frank, a fry cook at the cafe
- Kay, a waitress at the cafe
- Franny, a transvestite prostitute who caters to many of the café's other hustlers
- Tig and Bob, two sociopathic junkies and hustlers who prey on attractive new arrivals (both male and female) to the café
- Xavier, Joe's friend and fellow drug dealer, whose exploitation of a particularly wretched junkie moves Joe to consider quitting
- Rake, a hustler, one of the "Fellows on the Corner"
- Bonnie, a prostitute
- Stranger, Chuckles' hitman
- Ernesto, a hustler
- Rust, a prostitute
- Babe, a really "far gone" junkie
- Al, an alcoholic bum
- Martin, a junkie
- David, a hustler
- Terry and Judy, two prostitutes
- Carlo, a hustler
- Tim, a hustler

== Awards and nominations (1984 off-Broadway revival) ==
- 1985 Drama Desk Award:
  - Outstanding Ensemble Acting
  - Outstanding Director of a Play, John Malkovich
- 1985 Outer Critics Circle Award: Best Director, John Malkovich
- 1985 Obie Award:
  - Performance, Laurie Metcalf
  - Direction, John Malkovich
