= Northstar =

Northstar may refer to:

- Polaris, a star

== Arts and entertainment ==
- Northstar (rock band), an emo band from Alabama
- Northstar (rap group), an American hip hop duo
- "Northstar", a 2019 song by XXXTentacion from the album Bad Vibes Forever
- Northstar (character), a Marvel Comics superhero
- Northstar, a character in the video game Titanfall 2

== Transportation ==
- Northstar Line, a former commuter rail line in Minnesota
- Northstar engine series, a GM Premium V8 engine
- Northstar System, Cadillac's trademarked name for automobile features, including the Northstar V8 engine

== Other ==
- NorthStar (battery company), a company that produces lead-acid batteries and battery cabinets
- Northstar California, a ski resort in the Lake Tahoe area of California, United States
- NorthStar Center, a young adult therapeutic transition program, located in Bend, Oregon, United States
- Northstar Group, a Southeast Asian private equity fund manager
- Northstar Island, an artificial island in the Beaufort Sea, north of Alaska, United States
- Northstar, a wine label produced by the Chateau Ste. Michelle Wine Estates division of Altria
- North Star Computers, later styled NorthStar, an American computer company

== See also ==
- Star (disambiguation)
- North (disambiguation)
- Nordstar (disambiguation)
- North Star (disambiguation)
- Northern Star (disambiguation)
- Star of the North (disambiguation)
- Estrella del norte (disambiguation) (Spanish: Star of the North)
- Estrela do Norte (disambiguation) (Portuguese: Northern Star)
- Étoile du Nord (disambiguation) (French: North Star)
- Nordstern (disambiguation) (German: Northstar)
