= Purificación Zelaya =

Honduran politician

Purificación Zelaya (1866–1940) was a Honduran military officer, landlord and politician, hailing from Olanchito. During his youth years, Zelaya studied at the Military School of Tegucigalpa. In the Honduran Army he rose to the rank of general. A powerful man in Olanchito and the Yoro Department, Zelaya also served governor and Member of Parliament.

During his tenure as mayor of Olanchito (1902), Zelaya sought to establish educational institutions in his hometown. Buildings for the local boys' and girls' were constructed. He also supported the effort to set up a secondary school in the town, named Estrella del Norte.

In 1912 Zelaya brought a printing press to Olanchito, to set up El Esfuerzo printing company.
