= Étoile =

Étoile (French for "star") may refer to:

== Places ==
=== France ===
- Étoile-Saint-Cyrice, a commune in the Hautes-Alpes department
- Étoile-sur-Rhône, a commune in the Drôme department
- L'Étoile, Jura, a commune in the Jura department
- L'Étoile, Somme, a commune in the Somme department
- Massif de l'Étoile, a mountain range north of Marseilles
- Charles de Gaulle–Étoile station, a Paris Metro station
- Place de l'Étoile, a large road junction in Paris

=== Elsewhere ===
- Etoile, Kentucky, United States
- Etoile, Texas, United States
- Etoile Island, Marshall Islands, Micronesia
- Etoile Island (Seychelles), Amirante Islands, Seychelles

== Arts and entertainment ==
- Étoile, leading ballet dancer (male or female) in a company
- L'étoile (opera), an 1877 operetta by Emmanuel Chabrier
- Etoile (film), a 1989 film starring Jennifer Connelly
- Étoile (TV series), a 2025 TV series
- "L'étoile" (song), a 2016 song by Celine Dion
- "Etoile", a 2020 song by Oh My Girl

== Ships ==
- Étoile (A 649), a French naval schooner used as a training vessel
- French fluyt Étoile (1767), French fluyt, convoying ship of Bougainville's La Boudeuse

== Football clubs ==
- Etoile Haïtienne, a Haitian association football club
- Étoile Sportive du Sahel, a Tunisian association football club
- Étoile FC, a French football club who played in the Singaporean S. League from 2010 to 2012
- L'Etoile de Morne-à-l'Eau, a Guadeloupean club playing in the Guadeloupe Division of Honour

== Other uses ==
- L'Étoile AOC, appellation for wines made in the Jura wine region of France
- L'Étoile du Déséret, French periodical of LDS Church, later named L'Etoile
