= North Star Township =

North Star Township may refer to:

- North Star Township, Gratiot County, Michigan
- North Star Township, Brown County, Minnesota
- North Star Township, St. Louis County, Minnesota
- North Star Township, Burke County, North Dakota, in Burke County, North Dakota
