= Edite Estrela =

Portuguese politician (born 1949)

Edite Estrela GOIH MEP
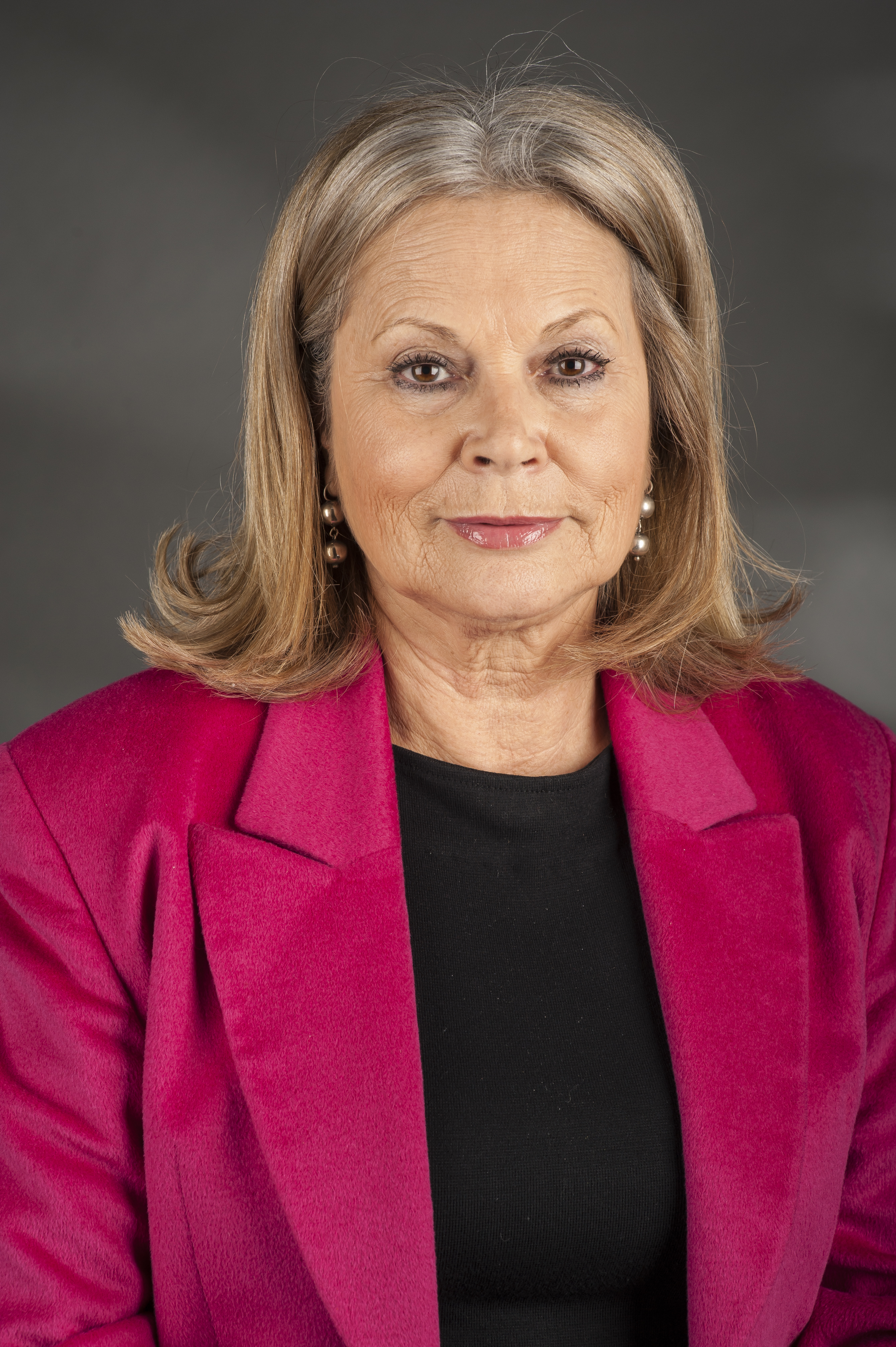
- Edite Estrela in 2014

First Vice President of the Assembly of the Republic
- In office 25 October 2019 – 26 March 2024
- President: Eduardo Ferro Rodrigues; Augusto Santos Silva
- Preceded by: José de Matos Correia
- Succeeded by: Teresa Morais

Member of the Assembly of the Republic
- Incumbent
- Assumed office 23 October 2015
- Constituency: Lisbon
- In office 17 December 2001 – 19 July 2004
- Constituency: Lisbon
- In office 19 July 1987 – 11 December 1993
- Constituency: Lisbon

Member of the European Parliament
- In office 20 July 2004 – 30 June 2014
- Constituency: Portugal

Mayor of Sintra
- In office 12 December 1993 – 16 December 2001
- Preceded by: Rui Silva
- Succeeded by: Fernando Seara

Personal details
- Born: 28 October 1949 (age 76) Carrazeda de Ansiães, Portugal
- Party: Socialist Party (1983–present)
- Children: 2
- Occupation: Politician
- Profession: Teacher

Edite de Fátima Santos Marreiros Estrela, GCIH (born 28 October 1949) is a Portuguese politician of the Socialist Party. She is currently the First Vice-President of the Assembly of the Republic.

Estrela was previously a Member of the European Parliament from 2004 until 2014. She was also the Mayor of Sintra between 1993 and 2001 and a teacher of literature.

== Political career ==
=== Member of the European Parliament, 2004–2014 ===
During her time in the European Parliament, Estrela was a member of the Committee on Women's Rights and Gender Equality and the Committee on the Environment, Public Health and Food Safety.

From 2009 until 2010, Estrela served as the parliament's rapporteur on draft legislation on parental leave. In 2013, she wrote a controversial parliamentary report on sexual and reproductive health and rights, which was narrowly rejected in the European Parliament.

In addition to her committee assignments, Estrela was part of the parliament's delegation for relations with the Mercosur countries (2009–2014), to the Euro-Latin American Parliamentary Assembly (2007–2014) and for relations with the countries of Central America (2007–2009).

=== Member of the Parliament of Portugal, 2015–present ===
In addition to her role in parliament, Estrela has been serving as a member of the Portuguese delegation to the Parliamentary Assembly of the Council of Europe since 2016. As a member of the Socialist Party, she is part of the Socialists, Democrats and Greens Group.

On the Assembly, Estrela serves on the Committee on the Honouring of Obligations and Commitments by Member States of the Council of Europe (since 2021); the Sub-Committee on Public Health and Sustainable Development (since 2020); the Sub-Committee on Gender Equality (since 2019); the Sub-Committee on the Rights of Minorities (since 2019); the Committee on Social Affairs, Health and Sustainable Development (since 2018); the Committee on Equality and Non-Discrimination (since 2018); and the Sub-Committee on Children (since 2018). She is also the Assembly's rapporteur on climate change, Romania, Georgia and equal access to digital technologies. Since 2022, she has been one of the Assembly's vice-presidents, under the leadership of president Tiny Kox.
