= Estrela report =

Report on women's health in the European Union

The Estrela report (officially Report on Sexual and Reproductive Health and Rights—A7-0306/2013) was a non-binding resolution on women's health and reproductive rights in the European Union advanced by the Portuguese MEP Edite Estrela of the Socialist Party in 2013. It was narrowly defeated in a vote in the European Parliament on 10 December 2013. A counter-resolution proposed by conservative and Eurosceptic MEPs was passed asserting that such issues should be dealt with on the national level.

== Background ==
European Union law forbids the Parliament from regulating reproductive and women's issues. In 2002, a similar resolution had been approved by the plenum. At the time the report was proposed, Ireland, Malta, and Poland were the only European Union countries with severe restrictions on abortion, allowing it only in cases of risk to a woman's life or not at all.

== Contents ==
The report, which contained almost ninety recommendations, called on member states to provide age-appropriate comprehensive sex education, treatment for sexually transmitted diseases and access to safe contraception and abortion (emphasising that abortion should not be used as a form of family planning). The report decried the harmful effects of teenage pregnancy and gender-based violence and stated that women's rights were equal to other human rights.

== Progress ==
The report was drafted by Portuguese MEP Edite Estrela of the Socialist Party, who stated that the purpose of the resolution was to underline that people ought to be able to make "their own informed and responsible choices on their sexual and reproductive life". In September 2013, it was approved by the European Parliament Committee on Women's Rights and Gender Equality by a large margin. The resolution was then voted on by the main European Parliament, which sent it back to the committee. Few changes were made and the committee approved it again, leading to a second vote in the main chamber on 10 December.

Supporters expected the vote to be routine because they believed the report was similar to previous resolutions. A number of social conservative and anti-abortion lobby groups, many of them newly formed, were vocal in their opposition to the report, including CitizenGo. Estrela received about 80,000 emails opposed to the report, in a campaign described as "astroturf" by the Gunda Werner Institute.

The floor debate was described as "acrimonious"; a failed resolution of the Europe of Freedom and Democracy group would have recommended providing information about "natural family planning", "post-abortion trauma" and encouraging young people to form relationships with the opposite sex. MEPs did not vote on the Estrela report but instead narrowly passed a resolution declaring that women's rights were a matter for the member states not the European Union by 334 to 327 votes, with 35 abstentions. After the announcement of the results, MEPs from right-wing parliamentary groups were heard jeering and catcalling. According to the European Women's Lobby, a few votes were incorrectly tallied and in fact an equal number of MEPs voted for and against the counter-resolution. Nevertheless, the counter-resolution stood.

Following the rejection of the report, Austrian MEP Hannes Swoboda, then president of the Progressive Alliance of Socialists and Democrats, criticized the "misleading and demagogical campaign" in opposition. Estrela said that the European Parliament had been more progressive in 2002.
