= Villa Nordstern =

Coordinates: 52.359743°N 9.954515°E

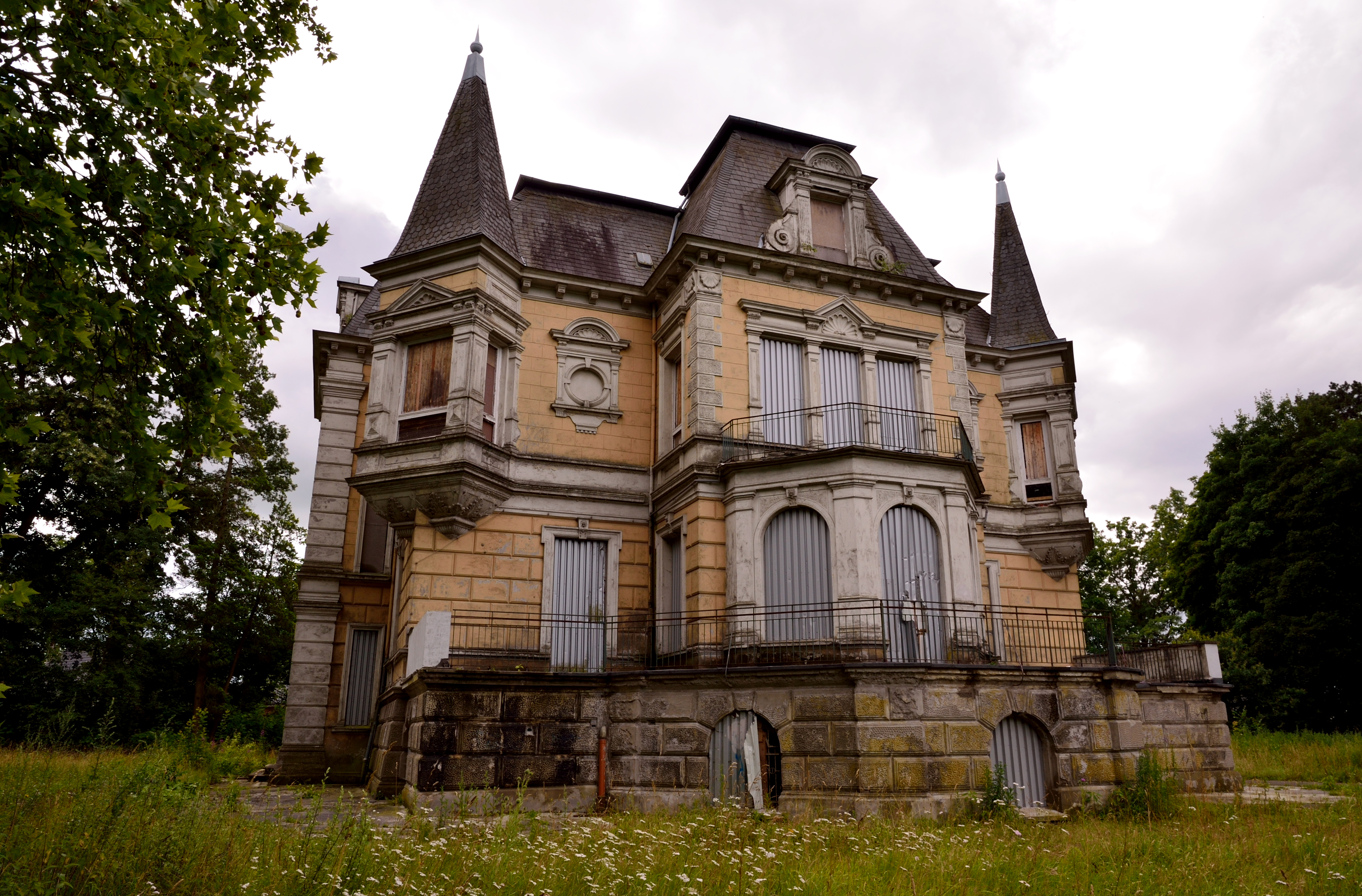
Villa Nordstern in 2012

The Villa Nordstern is a former grand residence on the Iltener Straße in Lehrte (formerly Ilten), Lower Saxony, Germany. It was built for industrial magnate Hermann Manske in 1892. Since 1990 it has stood abandoned, although there have been a variety efforts to restore it as a historic monument or private development.

== History ==
In 1892, the cement manufacturer and horse breeder Hermann Manske (1839–1918) had a home built in the village of Ilten, approximately 15 km east of the city of Hannover. It served both as his residence and headquarters of his portland cement company, Alemannia H. Manske & Co. Manske also developed a successful stud farm and maintained large areas around the villa to support it. He named the villa after his famous stallion "Nordstern", which made considerable profits on English racetracks. This gray stallion is said to be buried in the park of the villa.

After Manske's death, the villa passed through a variety of owners and was used as a children's home until about 1990. After that it became the property of the Hannover regional government. In 2004, the villa was in need of renovation and sold to a private individual. A new neighborhood called "Villa Nordstern" was built by developers around the villa.

In 2008, the city of Lehrte tried again to renovate the villa as an historical monument, but plans never materialized. The building remains in disrepair and the owner has filed multiple police reports regarding trespassing. Popular internet videos depict the villa as haunted in local lore.

The villa was purchased by a new owner on September 1, 2018. Plans are to create condominiums and reserve part of space of the villa for a kindergarten.
