= Massif de l'Étoile =

Mountain range in Provence, southern France

Coordinates: 43.39°N 5.45°E

The Massif de l'Étoile (Occitan: Montanha de l'Estela, French: massif de l'Étoile, i.e. "Star Mountain", "Star Massif") is a little mountain range located north of Marseille, in Occitania and in France. Its area is approximately 100 km² and its highest point stands at 779 m.
