= Pendragon (band) =

English neo-prog band

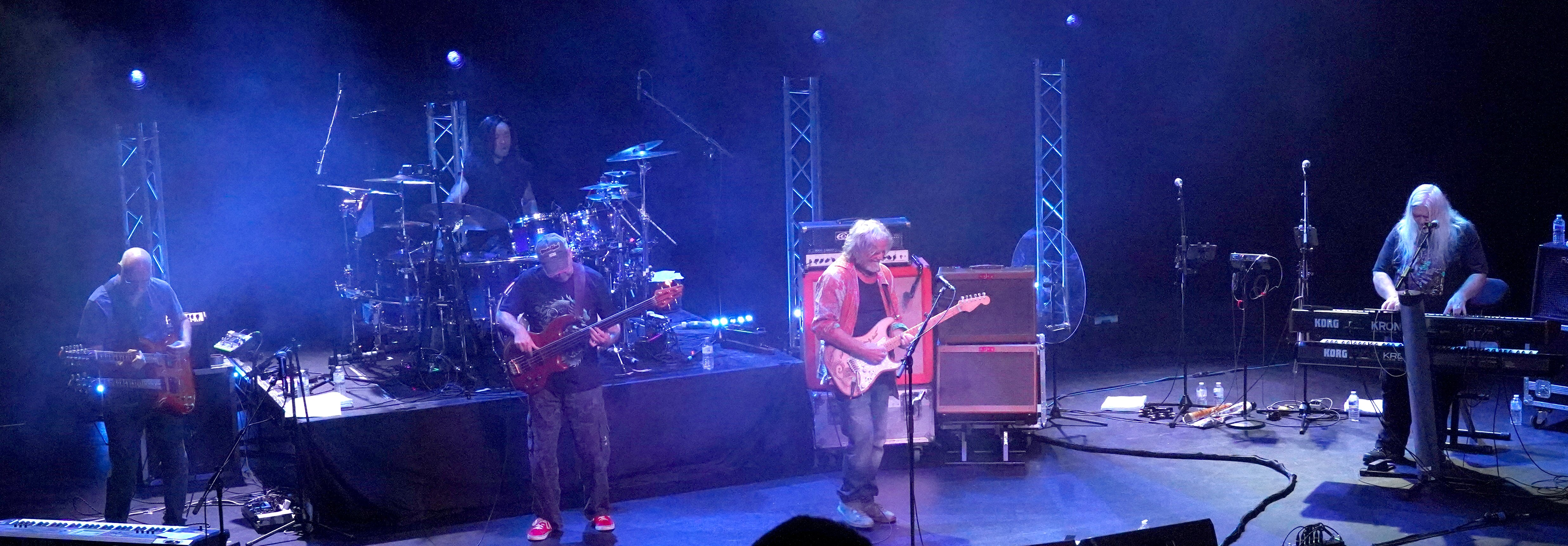
- Pendragon live in 2025

Background information
- Origin: Stroud, Gloucestershire, England
- Genres: Neo-prog; progressive rock
- Years active: 1978–present
- Labels: Metal Mind, Toff Records, Inside Out, Snapper
- Members: Nick Barrett; Peter Gee; Clive Nolan; Jan-Vincent Velazco; Rog Patterson
- Past members: John Barnfield; Alan Gyorffy; Nigel Harris; Matt Anderson; Rick Carter; Fudge Smith; Joe Crabtree; Scott Higham; Craig Blundell
- Website: www.pendragon.mu

Pendragon are an English neo-prog band established in 1978 in Stroud, Gloucestershire as Zeus Pendragon by guitarist and vocalist Nick Barrett. The word Zeus was dropped before the band started recording, as the members decided it was too long to look good on a T-shirt. There were a few personnel changes in the early days, but since 1986 the lineup has remained relatively stable (with only the drummer changing several times since then) and the band are still active as of 2025.

== History ==
The band were active in the progressive rock revival spearheaded by the likes of Marillion, Pallas, Solstice and Twelfth Night in the early 1980s, and indeed (like their peers IQ) often appeared as support acts to Marillion and other major neo-prog bands, both on tours and at the Marquee venue which hosted many regular prog evenings.

In spring 1984 the band took part in a 'battle of the bands' contest at Goldiggers club, in Chippenham, televised by the local HTV television station. This was named 'Best Bands West' and Pendragon performed O Devineo (spelling as credited on TV). A Bristol-based covers duo eventually won the contest. After their debut album The Jewel, the band pursued a more commercial direction, documented in the Kowtow album and the Red Shoes and Saved By You EPs, but despite these efforts failed to break through to a mainstream audience. The group appeared at the 1983 Reading Festival and were signed to Elusive Records.

=== 1991 - Toff Records ===
In 1991, the band established their own label, Toff Records, and released the archival release The Rest of Pendragon, a collection of EP tracks, and the studio album The World, in which they returned to a more progressive style that the band would continue to develop over their next three studio albums, The Window of Life, The Masquerade Overture, and Not of This World.

=== 2002 - Acoustically Challenged ===
In 2002, the band released Acoustically Challenged, documenting an "unplugged" session with a number of the band's songs retooled for acoustic instruments, which was originally broadcast on Radio 3 Warsaw. This was considered an unusual move for a progressive rock band, since progressive rock tends to focus a lot on the use of electronic synthesisers and electric guitars; however, the melodic qualities of the band's compositions proved to be well-suited to an acoustic context, and the album was reasonably successful. This heralded a new willingness to experiment on the part of the band, following a run of studio albums all broadly in the same vein as The World. On 2005's Believe they took their music in a somewhat darker direction, causing a certain amount of controversy amongst their fans. 2008's Pure, which featured elements of progressive metal, refined the style of Believe and was well received by the progressive rock fandom, being voted Album of the Year 2008 on DPRP.

On 21 April 2009, Pendragon released a live album and DVD, Concerto Maximo, shot in Katowice on 13 October 2008. It was filmed and edited by Metal Mind. It was released in several versions – a 2-CD release that features just the audio from the show, a DVD featuring the full show, and a DVD-and-2-CD special edition, which was limited to 1000 copies.

In October 2010, the band recorded the follow-up to Pure, the album Passion which was released in the spring of 2011. This was followed by Men Who Climb Mountains in 2014. Both albums continued the darker, heavier, more progressive metal-influenced direction of the band.

=== Since 2014 ===
In April 2014, the band announced that they had parted ways with drummer Scott Higham for "personal reasons". He was then replaced by Craig Blundell. In June 2015, Blundell was replaced by Jan-Vincent Velazco.

In September 2019 the band released a 40th Anniversary boxed set containing five compact discs. The first three represent a complete live concert recording made in London during 2018. The remaining two discs are re-mixed and remastered versions of the albums The World and Men Who Climb Mountains. In February 2020, a new album called Love Over Fear was released.

== Members ==
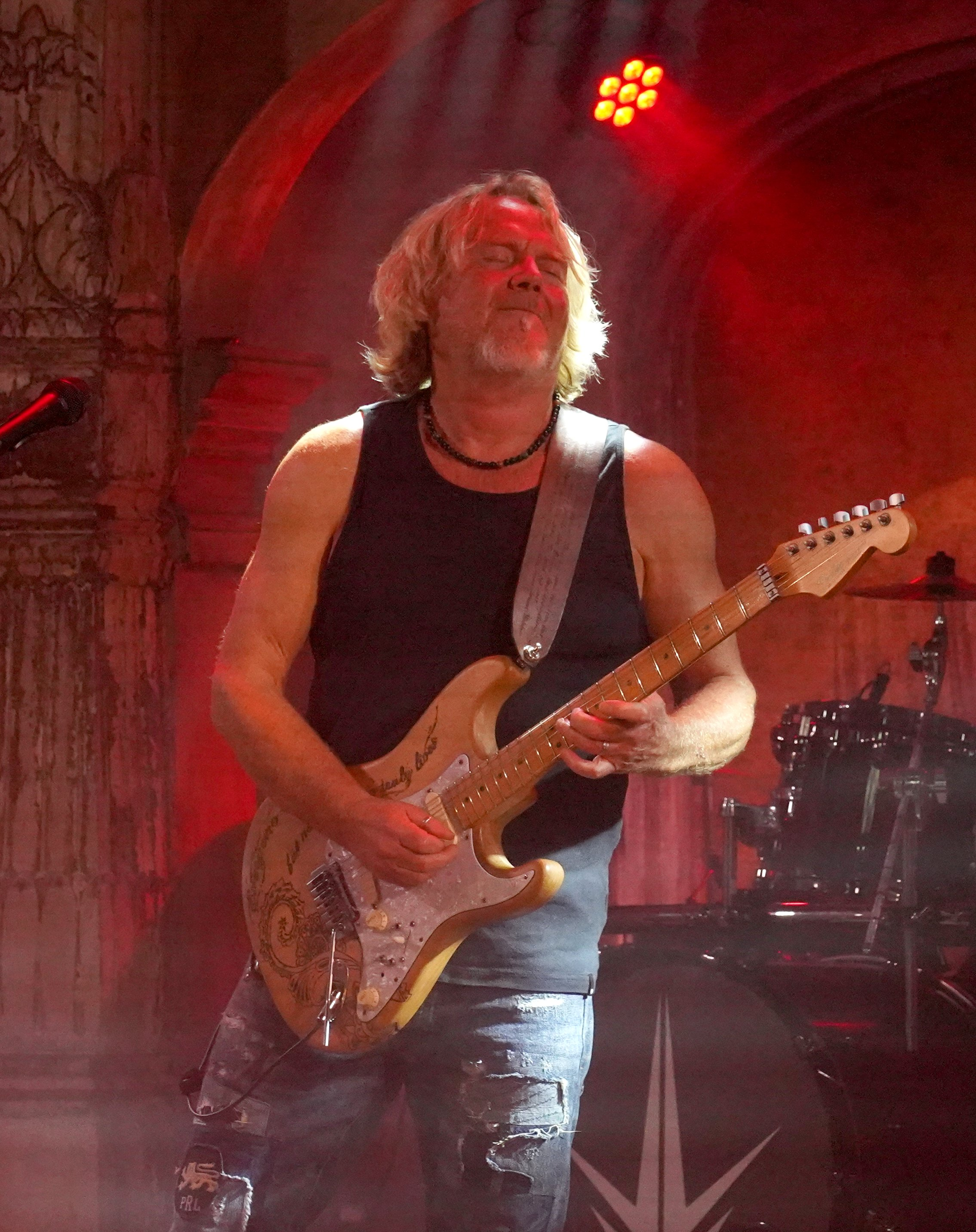
Barrett

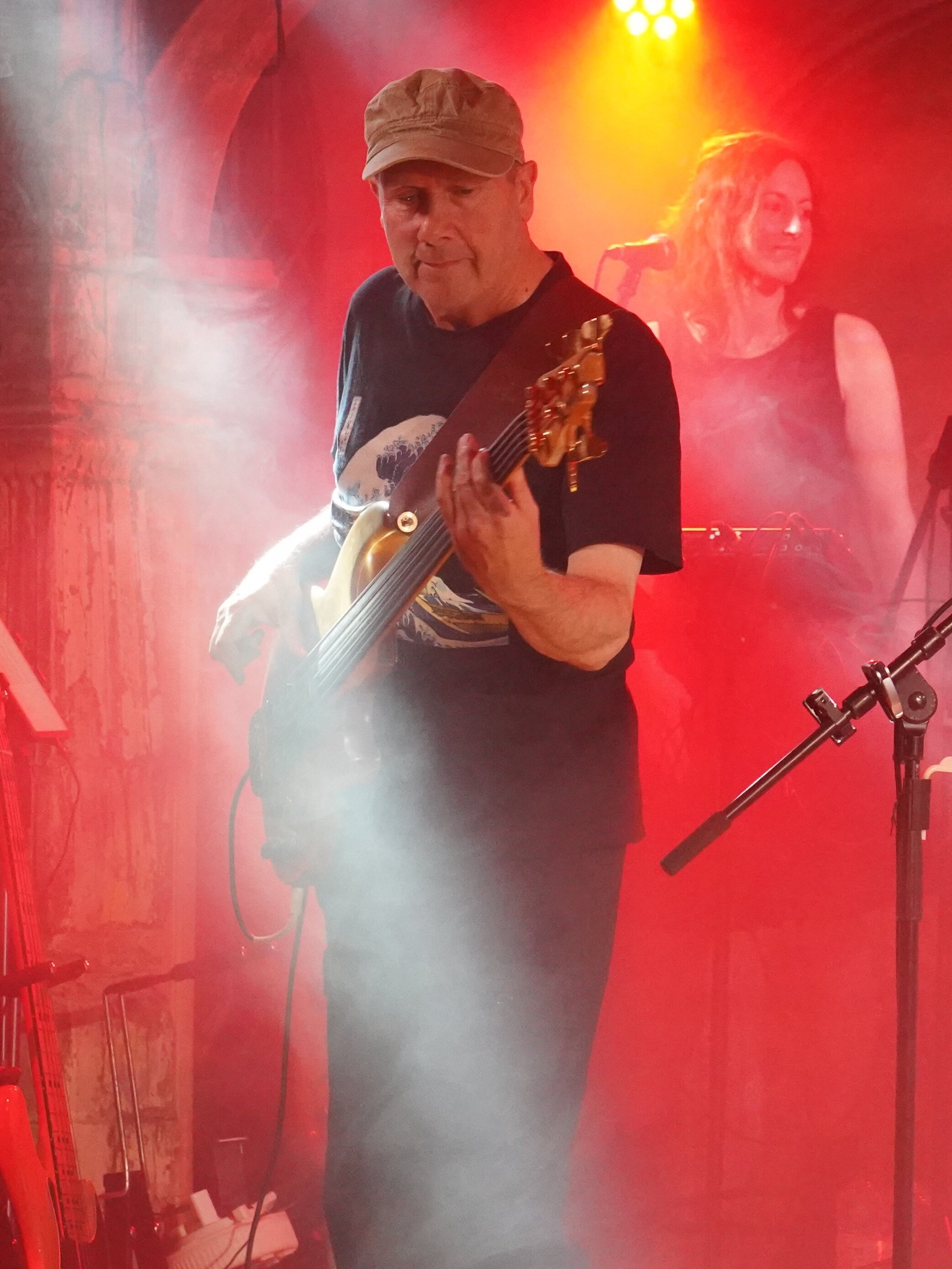
Gee

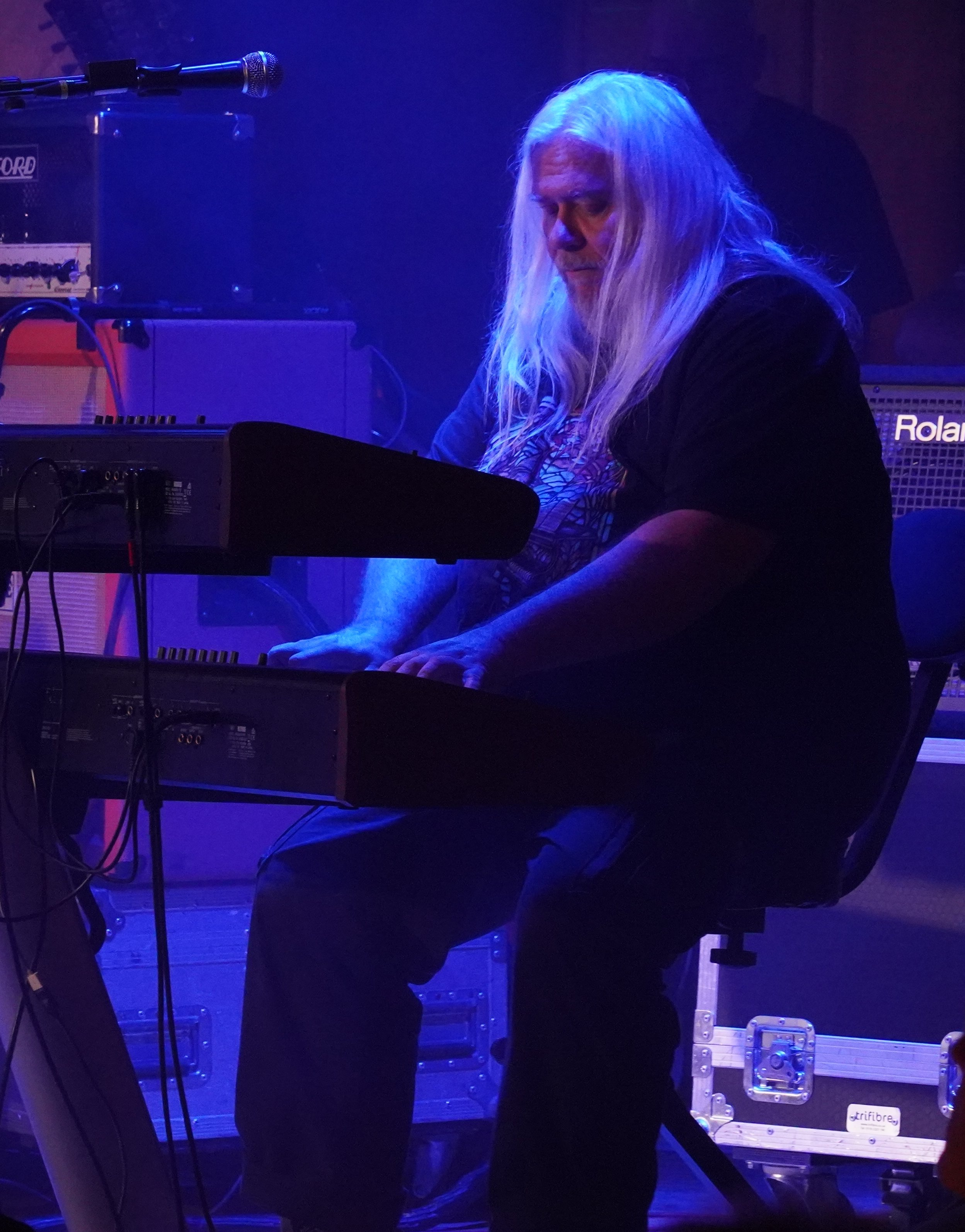
Nolan

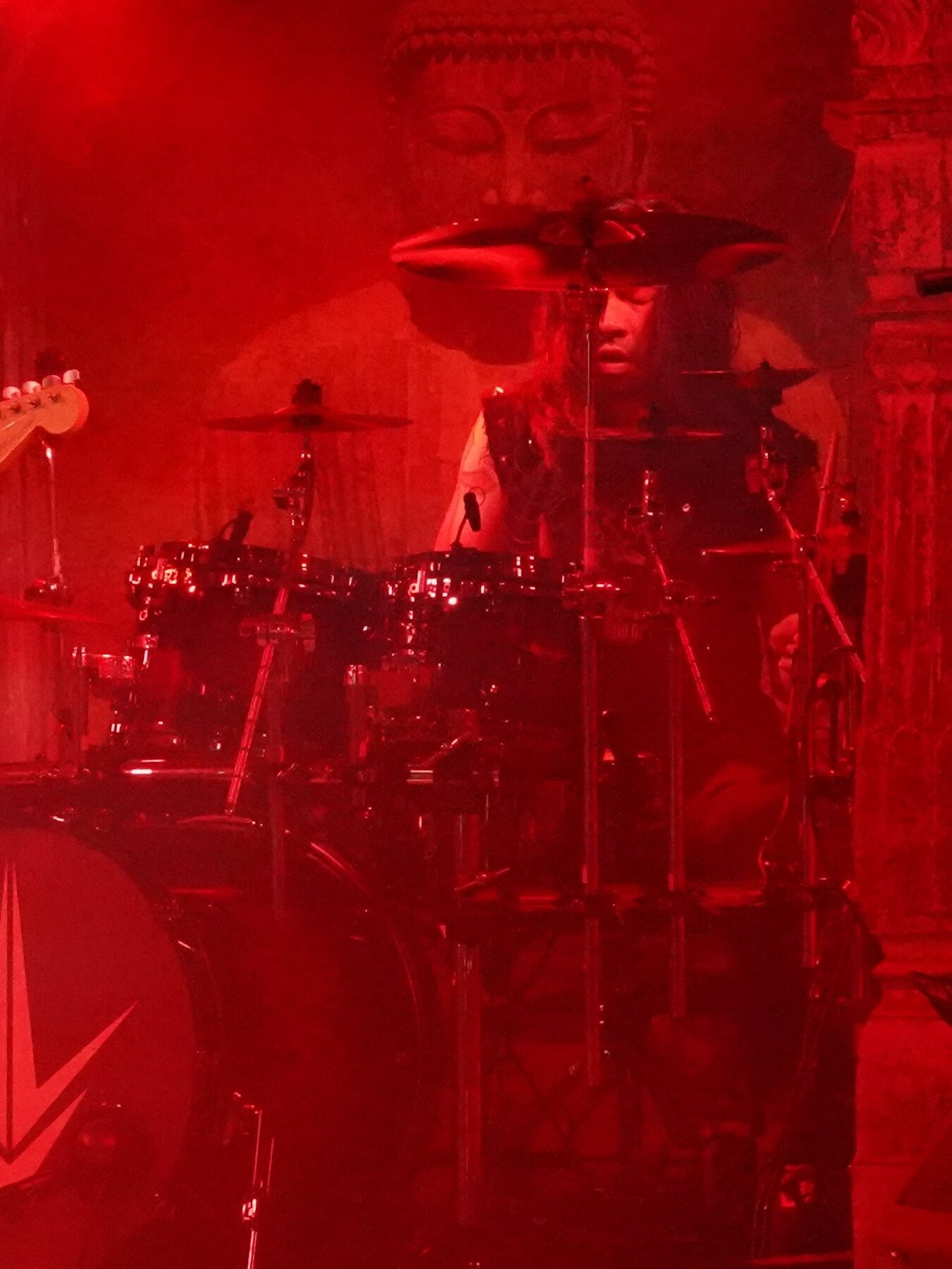
Velazco

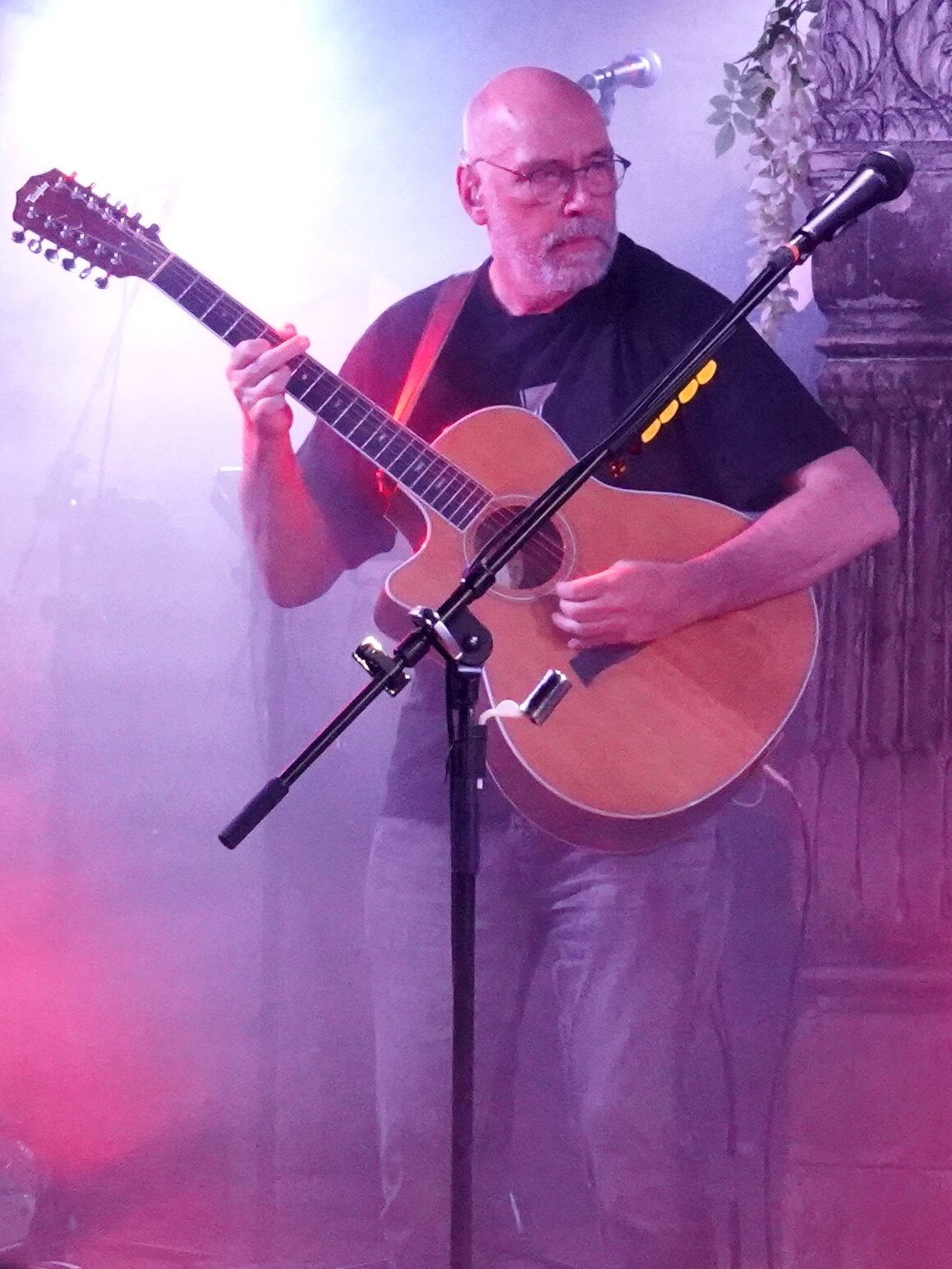
Patterson

Current members

- Nick Barrett – guitars, vocals, keyboards (1978–present)
- Peter Gee – bass guitar, backing vocals, keyboards (1978–present)
- Clive Nolan – keyboards, vocals (1986–present)
- Jan-Vincent Velazco – drums (2015–present)
- Rog Patterson – guitars (Live, 2023–present)
- Sally Minnear - backing vocals (Live, 2023-present)
- Johanna Stroud - backing vocals, violin (Live, 2023-present)

Former members

- John Barnfield – keyboards (1978–1984)
- Rick Carter – keyboards (1984–1986)
- Nigel Harris – drums (1980-1984)
- Alan Gyorffy – drums (1978–1980)
- Matt Anderson – drums (1984–1986)
- Fudge Smith – drums (1986–2006)
- Joe Crabtree – drums (2006–2008)
- Scott Higham – drums, backing vocals (2008–2014)
- Craig Blundell – drums (2014–2015)

== Discography ==
Studio albums

- The Jewel (1985)
- Kowtow (1988)
- The World (1991)
- The Window of Life (1993)
- The Masquerade Overture (1996)
- Not of This World (2001)
- Believe (2005)
- Pure (2008)
- Passion (2011)
- Men Who Climb Mountains (2014)
- Love Over Fear (2020)
