= Theâtre de l'Étoile du Nord =

Coordinates: 36°47′51″N 10°11′3″E

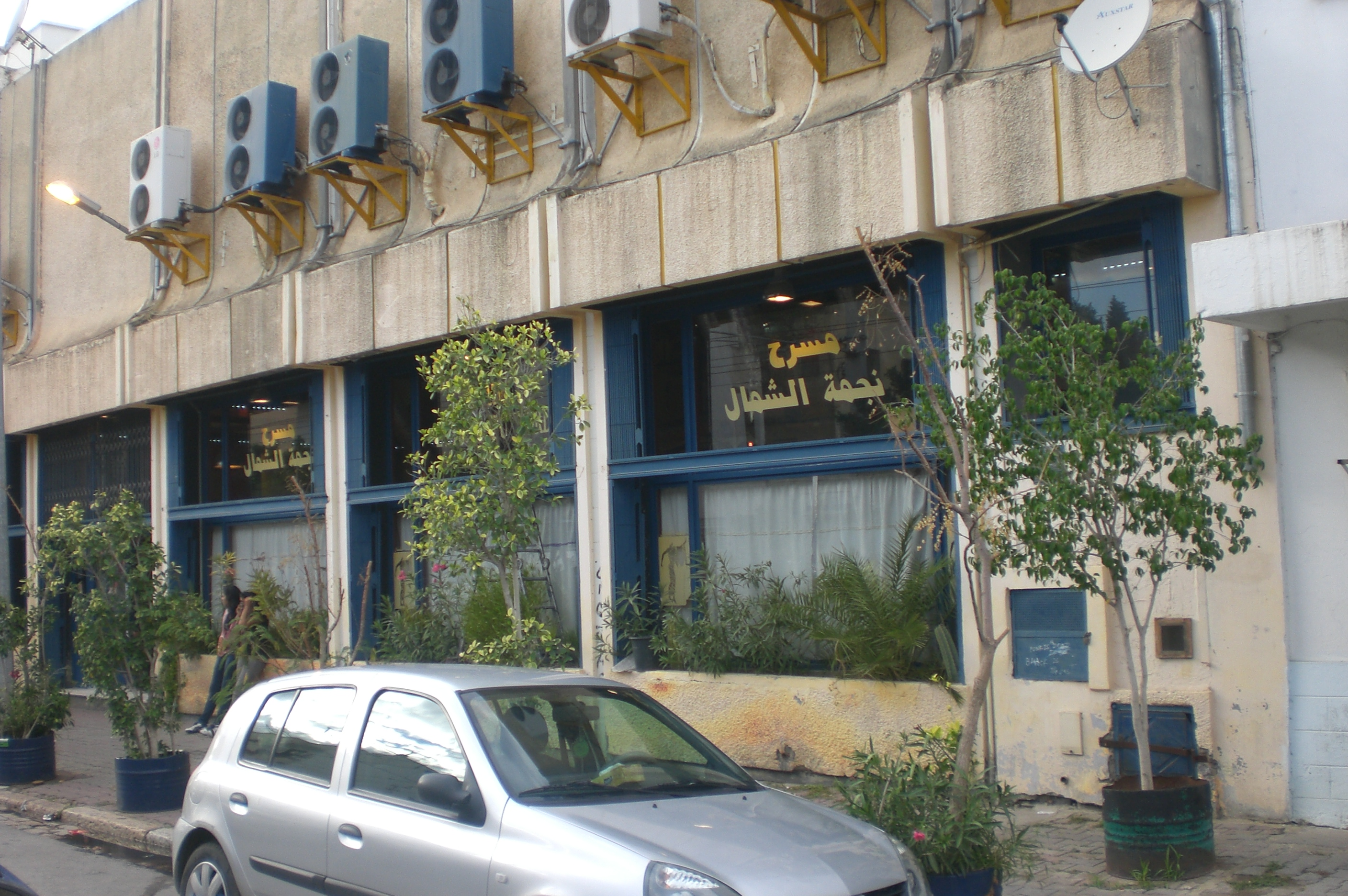
- Theâtre de l'Étoile du Nord

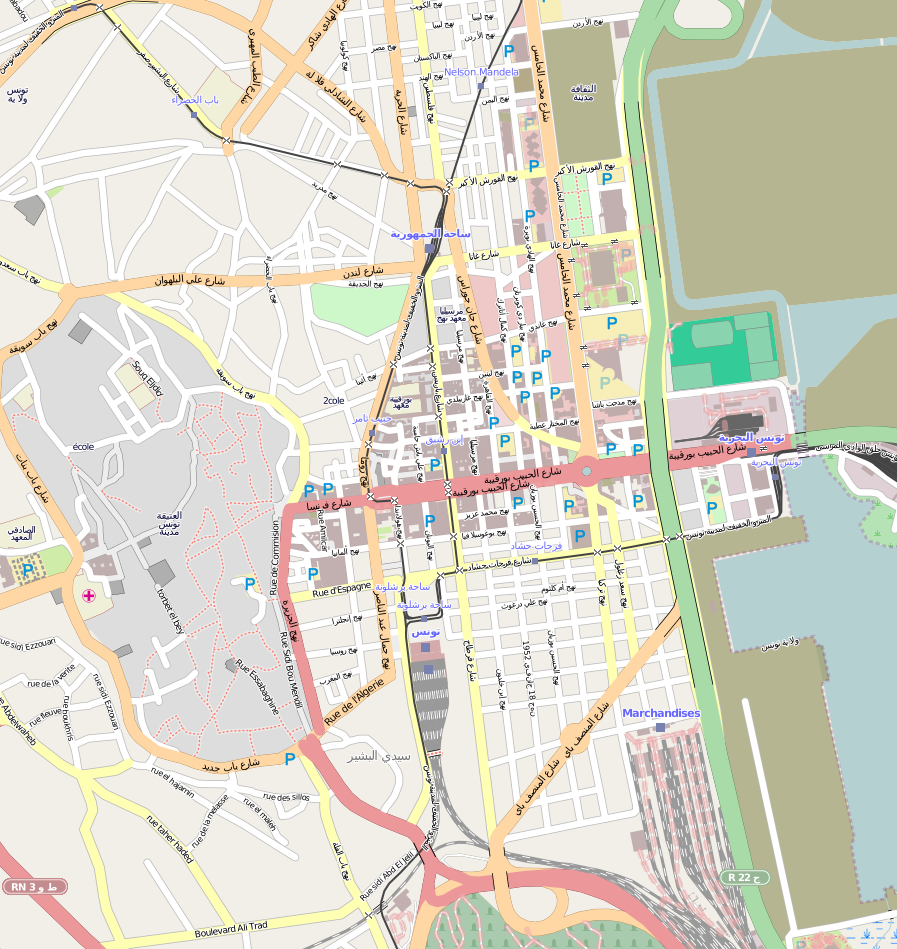
- Location (red dot) of the theatre, Avenue Habib Bourguiba is the road shaded pink (to the north).
- Address: 41 Avenue de Farhat-Hached; Tunis; Tunisia

Construction
- Opened: 26 February 2000

Website
- http://www.etoiledunord.org/

Theâtre de l'Étoile du Nord (Arabic: مسرح نجمة الشمال) also known as the North Star Theatre, is a theatre in the centre of Tunis, Tunisia. It is located at 41 Avenue de Farhat-Hached, near Avenue Habib Bourguiba since 26 February 2000; the theatrical production company was established on 29 February 1996. The premises of the theatre covers over 700 m^{2} (7,500 sq ft), its great hall covering 400 m^{2} (4,300 sq ft). Located in a former warehouse, it hosts concerts of all kind of music, literary meetings in French or Arabic and the theatrical presentations of the company of the Étoile du Nord. Said to be "as boho as Tunis gets", the theatre is popular with students and artists who meet in the alcohol-free cafe and its library. The theatre hosts around 160 events per year, including western style reggae, heavy metal and jazz groups performing and stand-up comedy.

== Features ==
Built over a land area of 700 square metres (7,500 sq ft) at a location where a commercial warehouse existed, the godown was refurbished, with architectural features of the theatre being in consonance with the requirement of contemporary theatre, with a foyer and auditorium designed with an appropriate hall to air ratio. The auditorium is designed for theatre shows, concerts, lectures, screenings, dance, and also hold training with an area of 400 square metres (4,300 sq ft). Its audience holding capacity is for seating 300 to 400 spectators (depending on configuration) or 600 standing spectators.. It has faculties to change the scenes for the shows within reasonable time frame for which it has 40 adjustable screens of 780 m² size with adjustable height facility of NiVOFLEX PRO make.

The theatre has not only facility for the shows and to seat a large audience but also has built in space for utilities comprising a library with reference books and documents related to Performing Arts, Architecture, Painting and Film and supported by an Internet facility, restrooms, lodgings which can accommodate 14 artists with all modern communication facilities, a modern light and sound control room, a store room, and office space for artists and administrators.
