= North Star Middle School =

North Star Middle School or Northstar Middle School may refer to:

- North Star Middle School, a former middle school within the Lincoln North Star High School, Lincoln, Nebraska
- North Star Middle School, in the North Star School District, Boswell, Pennsylvania
- Northstar Middle School, in the Lake Washington School District, King County, Washington
- Northstar Middle School, in the Eau Claire Area School District, Wisconsin
