= Passion (Pendragon album) =

Studio album by Pendragon
- Released: 11 April 2011
- Recorded: September 2010 through January 2011
- Genres: Neo-prog; progressive rock; progressive metal
- Length: CD: 54:45; DVD: 121:00
- Labels: Madfish, Toff Records
- Producers: Karl Groom and Nick Barrett

Pendragon chronology
Pure (2008)	Passion (2011)	Men Who Climb Mountains (2014)

Passion is the ninth studio album by English neo-prog group Pendragon. It was released as a special edition on 11 April 2011 on Madfish, a division label of Snapper Music and in regular form through Toff Records, the band's own imprint. Two packaging formats of the Madfish album exist, digi-book and super jewel case both accompanied by a DVD featuring a behind-the-scenes footage titled 'Progumentary', filmed by the band themselves during the recording of the album. There is also a two-disc, three-sided orange coloured vinyl edition with gatefold sleeve.

== Reception ==
Professional ratings
Review scores
Source	Rating
AllMusic	3.5/5 stars

The global impression of the album was generally positive, with a 4.04 out of 5 stars score in Prog Archives, across 123 given ratings as for 22 May 2011. Dangerdog website gave it a 4 out of 5 score, describing it as "intriguing, complicated, and entertaining" and remarking "those who were persuaded by Pendragon's talent and creativity on Pure will likely be pleased with Passion; it's more of the same, but not". Sea of Tranquility advises "in comparison to the light-hearted, feel-good symphonic prog of their albums from the early 1990s, this may feel like a radical departure for some", giving it 3.5 out of 5 stars. A more enthusiastic Rock Report states that "because of the diversity and continuous change of atmospheres, it's hard to point out the highlights" and "maybe it means that the whole album is a highlight".

== Track listing ==
=== CD+DVD edition ===
CD

All tracks are written by Nick Barrett.

No.	Title	Length
1.	"Passion"	5:27
2.	"Empathy"	11:20
3.	"Feeding Frenzy"	5:47
4.	"This Green And Pleasant Land"	13:13
5.	"It's Just A Matter Of Not Getting Caught"	4:41
6.	"Skara Brae"	7:31
7.	"Your Black Heart"	6:46
Total length:		54:45

DVD

- "Progumentary"

=== Vinyl edition ===
Side 1

1. "Passion"
2. "Empathy"

Side 2

1. "Feeding Frenzy"
2. "This Green And Pleasant Land"

Side 3

1. "It's Just A Matter Of Not Getting Caught"
2. "Skara Brae"
3. "Your Black Heart "

== Personnel ==
- Nick Barrett: guitars, lead vocals, keyboards, programming
- Clive Nolan: keyboards, backing vocals
- Peter Gee: bass
- Scott Higham: drums, backing vocals

== Charts ==
Chart (2011)	Peak position
Polish Albums Chart	47
