= Barefoot Theatre Company =

The Barefoot Theatre Company is a theatre company in New York City.

The company was founded in 1999 by Francisco Solorzano, Victoria Malvagno, and Christopher Whalen. In addition to theatre, the company also develops theater and film (via sister co. Barefoot Studio Pictures) in New York and Los Angeles.

== Past productions ==
Past productions have included the first stage adaptation of Sidney Lumet's Dog Day Afternoon in 2008, and a revival of Lanford Wilson's Balm of Gilead in 2005.
