= Nordstern (club) =

Nightclub in Basel, Switzerland

- Location: Basel, Switzerland
- Type: Nightclub
- Events: techno, house, minimal, tech-house
- Capacity: 800

Construction
- Opened: 2000

Website
- http://nordstern.com

Nordstern is a nightclub situated in Basel, Switzerland, between Voltaplatz and the Novartis Campus, in an old electricity plant. It was inducted into Swiss Night Life's 'Hall Of Fame' after being voted number 1 for "Best Specialized Swiss Club" in 2012.

== History ==
The club was founded in 2000 with the intention of becoming an artist's workshop and presentation-room for people engaged in the arts and cultural sector of Basel. Without destroying Nordstern's industrial flair, the location was completely redesigned in September 2010. The location now presents itself as an interactive meeting place for creatives and has been further remodeled as a specialized technoclub.

== Style ==
The musical genres played at Nordstern vary however the main focus is on underground electronic music including house and techno. Andrea Oliva is the club's resident DJ. Oliva teamed up with Zurich local and owner of Nordstern, Agi Isaku, to throw parties and select the lineups for their Saturday night parties, which have featured appearances by DJs such as Carl Craig, Ellen Allien and Ricardo Villalobos who at the end of 2008 and 2010 was voted number 1 in Resident Advisor's Top 100 DJs of the year
