= North Star (1902 sternwheeler) =

Steamboat in Washington state

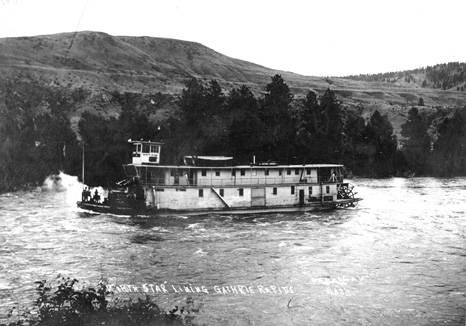
- North Star lining Guthrie Rapids on the Okanogan River

History
- Name: North Star'
- Route: Columbia River, Okanogan River
- In service: 1902
- Out of service: 1915
- Identification: US #130967; after reconstruction: US #204761
- Fate: Burned July 8, 1915 at Wenatchee, Washington
- Notes: reconstructed and enlarged 1907

General characteristics
- Type: inland steamship (passenger/freight)
- Tonnage: 129 gross/92 registered tons (after reconstruction: 198 gross/125 registered tons)
- Length: 84.5 ft (26 m) after reconstruction: 99.7 ft (30 m)
- Beam: 17.1 ft (5 m) after reconstruction:21.4 ft (7 m)
- Depth: 3.6 ft (1 m) depth of hold after reconstruction: 4.1 ft (1 m)
- Installed power: twin steam engines, horizontally mounted (after reconstruction: 9" bore x 42" stroke 5.4 nominal horsepower, 130 indicated horsepower)
- Propulsion: sternwheel

North Star was a sternwheel steamboat that operated in eastern Washington from 1902 to 1904. This vessel should not be confused with the other vessels, some of similar design, also named North Star.

== Construction ==
The North Star was built at Wenatchee, Washington in 1902 by George Cotterell for the Columbia & Okanogan Steamboat Company, which Captain Alexander Griggs (1828–1903) was the principal owner.

== Operations ==
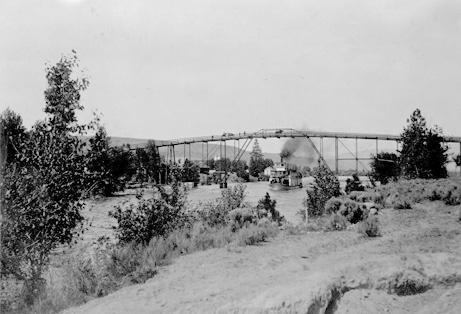
North Star passing under steel bridge at Okanogan circa 1910

North Star operated out of Wenatchee on the Columbia and Okanogan rivers. On September 3, 1902, North Star was wrecked in Entiat Rapids. The company was able to salvage the vessel. In 1907 at Wenatchee, North Star was rebuilt and enlarged by the veteran shipwright Alexander Watson. (Another source states that the vessel was sold to H.S. DePuy & Will Lake and renamed Enterprise, and a new vessel, also called North Star was built in 1907. A third source states the vessel was rebuilt.)

== Withdrawn from service ==
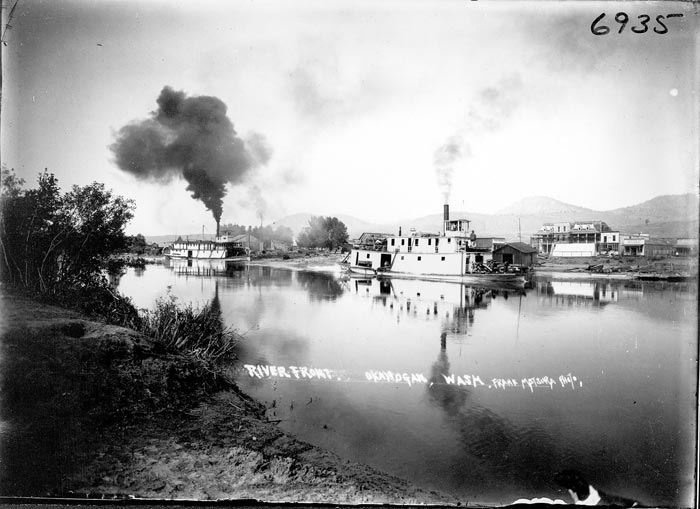
Steamboats at the Okanogan wharf, May 1909. While these vessels are in active service, in six years almost all steamboat activity on the Columbia River above Wenatchee will have ceased.

Settlement in the Okanogan region decreased starting in about 1910. As a result, business declined so much that by 1915, the Columbia & Okanogan Steamboat Co. was forced to take all of its boats out of service. The company had made arrangements to sell North Star to Captain Fred McDermott, who was considering taking the vessel further up the Columbia, to run between Pateros and Bridgeport.

== Destruction by fire ==
The sale of North Star had not been finalized when on July 8, 1915, fire broke out on North Star when she was rafted up at Wenatchee with the rest of the company's remaining boats, the Columbia, Okanogan, and Chelan. North Star was the outermost vessel, but the fire soon spread to the other three. All the vessels were rapidly and completely destroyed, and although the hull of the innermost vessel, Chelan remained afloat, the damage to that vessel was beyond repair. There was no insurance. The Columbia & Okanogan Steamboat Co. had so little money that they were planning to use some of the proceeds of the anticipated sale of North Star to pay the insurance premiums on the remaining three vessels. The cause of the fire was never determined.

== See also ==
- Steamboats of the Columbia River, Wenatchee Reach
