= Estrella del Norte =

Secondary school in Olanchito, Honduras

Estrella del Norte was a secondary school in Olanchito, Honduras. Estrella del Norte was set up by Presbyter Modesto Chacón, under the administration of mayor Purificación Zelaya in 1902. It was the first secondary school in the town. However, the school was shut down after two years of existence.
