= Pure (Pendragon album) =

Studio album by Pendragon
- Released: October 1, 2008
- Recorded: 2008
- Genres: Neo-prog; progressive rock; progressive metal
- Length: 53:10 (CD); 84:00 (DVD)
- Labels: Toff Records (regular edition); Madfish (special edition)
- Producers: Nick Barrett; Karl Groom

Pendragon chronology
Believe (2005)	Pure (2008)	Passion (2011)

Pure is the eighth studio album by English neo-prog group Pendragon. It was first released on October 1, 2008, as a regular edition on Toff Records, the band's own imprint, and reissued on March 14, 2011, as a special CD+DVD edition in rigid digi book through Madfish, a division label of Snapper Music. The DVD in the new special packaging has an 1hr. 24min. footage titled 'Handy-Cam Progumentary', recorded by the band themselves.

== Reception ==
The overall reception of the album was very much positive.

In a round table review, DPRP embraced the album with acclaim words such as "it brims with great ideas, is full of surprises and sees the band at the very top of their game" (Gareth Long, 9.5 out of 10), "this album is proof of the fact that Pendragon is still one of the top progressive rock bands and with this album they are not just standing ground they are gaining new" (Dries Dokter, 9 out of 10), "Pure is a very good album and stepped up to be my new favourite Pendragon album, I never thought that this would happen" (Edwin Roosjen, 9.5 out of 10).

RevelationZ online magazine gave it a 7 out of 10 score and stressed "mainman - vocalist & guitarist - Nick Barrett's songs draw blood with razor sharp metaphors, often bleak but always human, cleverly broken up by melodic, muscular guitar and keyboard passages, set against a busy, but never intrusive background of whitenoise and special FX".

Lords of Metal also paid attention to the album and noticed that "where Marillion drifted off of the ‘standard’ prog route Pendragon stayed steadily on course without repeating themselves", concluding with a 90/100 score.

In a 9.5 out of 10 review, The Metal Observer writes: "Pendragon usually are labeled as 'Neo-Prog', but on Pure they are giving themselves heavier than ever in some passages and more intense and emotional in others, creating a highly addictive juxtaposition that makes them stand out from their peers" and "everything together results in a departure from their old sound".

Classic Rock magazine described it as "Pendragon’s finest hour so far without a doubt" and was voted "Album Of The Year" by its readers, at the same time Blogcritics vindicates "this album is so good it just had to be done".

== Track listing ==
All songs written by Nick Barrett.

=== Regular edition ===
1. "Indigo" – 13:44
2. "Eraserhead" – 9:05
3. "Comatose (I. View From The Seashore)" – 7:41
4. "Comatose (II. Space Cadet)" – 4:02
5. "Comatose (III. Home and Dry)" – 5:55
6. "The Freak Show" - 4:26
7. "It's Only Me" - 8:16

=== CD+DVD edition ===
==== CD ====
The same track list as the regular edition.

==== DVD ====
- "Handy-Cam Progumentary"

== Personnel ==
- Nick Barrett - guitars, lead vocals, keyboards, programming
- Clive Nolan - keyboards, backing vocals
- Peter Gee - bass
- Scott Higham - drums, backing vocals
