= HMS North Star =

Three ships of the Royal Navy have borne the name HMS North Star, named after the pole star:

- HMS North Star (1810) was a 20-gun sixth rate launched in 1810. She was sold in 1817 and became the mercantile Columbo.
- HMS North Star (1824) was a 28-gun sixth rate launched in 1824. She was broken up in 1860.
- HMS North Star II, built in 1893 as the steam yacht Venetia, used as an armed yacht 1915–19.
- HMS North Star (1916) was an Admiralty M-class destroyer launched in 1916. She was sunk in 1918 by coastal artillery near Zeebrugge.

== See also ==
- USCGC North Star
- North Star (disambiguation)
