= List of ships built by Hall, Russell & Company (301–400) =

List of ships built by Aberdeen shipbuilders Hall, Russell & Company, from yard number 301 to 400.

The ships built in the sequence 301 to 400 cover the period 1896 to 1906. The majority of vessels built during this period were fishing vessels for British owners, with a smaller number of cargo vessels for British and overseas owners.

List of Hall, Russell & Company built ships (301–400)
| Name | Image | Yard Number | Construction | Type | Year | Length Overall | Breadth | Depth | Tonnage | Ref(s) |
|---|---|---|---|---|---|---|---|---|---|---|
| Inyati | | 301 | | Passenger and Cargo | 1896 | 310 feet 9 inches (94.72 m) | 40 feet 1 inch (12.22 m) | 25 feet 11 inches (7.90 m) | 2,516 long tons (2,556 t) | |
| Fife Ness | | 302 | | Liner (Fishing) | 1897 | 95 feet 3 inches (29.03 m) | 19 feet 7 inches (5.97 m) | 11 feet (3.4 m) | 130 long tons (130 t) | |
| Ingeli | | 303 | Spar Deck | Passenger and Cargo | 1897 | 330 feet 1 inch (100.61 m) | 41 feet 2 inches (12.55 m) | 18 feet 6 inches (5.64 m) | 2,928 long tons (2,975 t) | |
| Champion | | 304 | | Trawler - Steam | 1897 | 105 feet 3 inches (32.08 m) | 20 feet 7 inches (6.27 m) | 12 feet (3.7 m) | 165 long tons (168 t) | |
| Craig Gowan | | 305 | Steel | Liner (Fishing) | 1897 | 95 feet 6 inches (29.11 m) | 19 feet 7 inches (5.97 m) | 10 feet 2 inches (3.10 m) | 126 long tons (128 t) | |
| John Nutten | | 306 | | Trawler - Steam | 1898 | 102 feet 3 inches (31.17 m) | 21 feet 7 inches (6.58 m) | 11 feet 7 inches (3.53 m) | 161 long tons (164 t) | |
| Challenger | | 307 | Steel | Trawler - Steam | 1897 | 107 feet 5 inches (32.74 m) | 20 feet 1 inch (6.12 m) | 10 feet 7 inches (3.23 m) | 151 long tons (153 t) | |
| Captain | | 308 | Steel | Trawler - Steam | 1898 | 100 feet 5 inches (30.61 m) | 20 feet 1 inch (6.12 m) | 10 feet 7 inches (3.23 m) | 134 long tons (136 t) | |
| Bolivar | | 309 | | Passenger and Caro | 1898 | 223 feet 7 inches (68.15 m) | 33 feet 1 inch (10.08 m) | 16 feet 6 inches (5.03 m) | 1,016 long tons (1,032 t) | |
| Caledonia | | 310 | Steel | Trawler - Steam | 1898 | 100 feet 4 inches (30.58 m) | 20 feet 1 inch (6.12 m) | 10 feet 7 inches (3.23 m) | 144 long tons (146 t) | |
| John S. Boyle | | 311 | | Trawler - Steam | 1898 | 100 feet 3 inches (30.56 m) | 20 feet 1 inch (6.12 m) | 11 feet 3 inches (3.43 m) | 143 long tons (145 t) | |
| Curiser | | 312 | | Trawler - Steam | 1898 | 100 feet 3 inches (30.56 m) | 20 feet 1 inch (6.12 m) | 11 feet 3 inches (3.43 m) | 144 long tons (146 t) | |
| Mary Bell | | 313 | | Trawler - Steam | 1898 | 100 feet 3 inches (30.56 m) | 20 feet 1 inch (6.12 m) | 11 feet 3 inches (3.43 m) | 144 long tons (146 t) | |
| Salamis | | 314 | Steel | Passenger and Cargo | 1899 | 392 feet 7 inches (119.66 m) | 47 feet 2 inches (14.38 m) | 21 feet 5 inches (6.53 m) | 4,508 long tons (4,580 t) | |
| Strathearn | | 315 | | Trawler - Steam | 1898 | 103 feet 1 inch (31.42 m) | 22 feet 1 inch (6.73 m) | 11 feet 8 inches (3.56 m) | 147 long tons (149 t) | |
| Stratherrick | | 316 | Steel | Trawler - Steam | 1898 | 102 feet 1 inch (31.12 m) | 21 feet 6 inches (6.55 m) | 10 feet 9 inches (3.28 m) | 161 long tons (164 t) | |
| Insizwa | | 317 | Steel | Passenger and Cargo | 1899 | 330 feet 2 inches (100.63 m) | 41 feet 1 inch (12.52 m) | 18 feet 6 inches (5.64 m) | 2,942 long tons (2,989 t) | |
| Ben Alder | | 318 | | Trawler - Steam | 1899 | 103 feet 3 inches (31.47 m) | 20 feet 2 inches (6.15 m) | 11 feet 7 inches (3.53 m) | 151 long tons (153 t) | |
| Ben More | | 319 | | Trawler - Steam | 1899 | 103 feet 3 inches (31.47 m) | 20 feet 2 inches (6.15 m) | 11 feet 7 inches (3.53 m) | 151 long tons (153 t) | |
| Ben Venue | | 320 | | Trawler - Steam | 1899 | 103 feet 3 inches (31.47 m) | 20 feet 2 inches (6.15 m) | 11 feet 7 inches (3.53 m) | 151 long tons (153 t) | |
| Crimond | | 321 | | Trawler - Steam | 1899 | 110 feet 3 inches (33.60 m) | 21 feet 1 inch (6.43 m) | 11 feet 7 inches (3.53 m) | 173 long tons (176 t) | |
| Cairness | | 322 | | Trawler - Steam | 1899 | 110 feet 3 inches (33.60 m) | 21 feet 1 inch (6.43 m) | 11 feet 7 inches (3.53 m) | 174 long tons (177 t) | |
| Cortes | | 323 | | Trawler - Steam | 1899 | 110 feet 3 inches (33.60 m) | 21 feet 1 inch (6.43 m) | 11 feet 7 inches (3.53 m) | 174 long tons (177 t) | |
| Mormond | | 324 | | Trawler - Steam | 1899 | 110 feet 3 inches (33.60 m) | 21 feet 1 inch (6.43 m) | 11 feet 7 inches (3.53 m) | 173 long tons (176 t) | |
| Strathmore | | 325 | | Trawler - Steam | 1899 | 102 feet 3 inches (31.17 m) | 21 feet 7 inches (6.58 m) | 11 feet 7 inches (3.53 m) | 163 long tons (166 t) | |
| Strathbran | | 326 | | Trawler - Steam | 1899 | 102 feet 3 inches (31.17 m) | 21 feet 7 inches (6.58 m) | 11 feet 7 inches (3.53 m) | 163 long tons (166 t) | |
| Setter | | 327 | | Trawler - Steam | 1900 | 106 feet 3 inches (32.39 m) | 21 feet 7 inches (6.58 m) | 12 feet 3 inches (3.73 m) | 181 long tons (184 t) | |
| Ivernia | | 328 | | Trawler - Steam | 1900 | 103 feet 3 inches (31.47 m) | 20 feet 1 inch (6.12 m) | 11 feet 7 inches (3.53 m) | 155 long tons (157 t) | |
| Ben Attow | | 329 | Steel | Trawler - Steam | 1900 | 103 feet 3 inches (31.47 m) | 20 feet 4 inches (6.20 m) | 11 feet (3.4 m) | 156 long tons (159 t) | |
| Iris | | 330 | Steel | Trawler - Steam | 1900 | 103 feet 1 inch (31.42 m) | 20 feet 4 inches (6.20 m) | 11 feet (3.4 m) | 155 long tons (157 t) | |
| Ben Doran | | 331 | Steel | Trawler - Steam | 1900 | 103 feet (31 m) | 20 feet 3 inches (6.17 m) | 11 feet 7 inches (3.53 m) | 155 long tons (157 t) | |
| Strathallan | | 332 | Steel | Trawler - Steam | 1900 | 108 feet 1 inch (32.94 m) | 21 feet 6 inches (6.55 m) | 11 feet 5 inches (3.48 m) | 175 long tons (178 t) | |
| Strathcona | | 333 | Steel | Trawler - Steam | 1900 | 108 feet 1 inch (32.94 m) | 21 feet 6 inches (6.55 m) | 11 feet 5 inches (3.48 m) | 185 long tons (188 t) | |
| Gilcomston | | 334 | Steel | Cargo Steamer | 1900 | 250 feet (76 m) | 36 feet 2 inches (11.02 m) | 15 feet 1 inch (4.60 m) | 1,507 long tons (1,531 t) | |
| Crocus | | 335 | Steel | Trawler - Steam | 1900 | 103 feet 3 inches (31.47 m) | 20 feet 6 inches (6.25 m) | 11 feet 3 inches (3.43 m) | 160 long tons (160 t) | |
| Pretoria | | 336 | Steel | Trawler - Steam | 1900 | 103 feet 3 inches (31.47 m) | 20 feet 6 inches (6.25 m) | 11 feet 3 inches (3.43 m) | 159 long tons (162 t) | |
| Ben Wyvis | | 337 | | Trawler - Steam | 1900 | 103 feet 3 inches (31.47 m) | 20 feet 7 inches (6.27 m) | 11 feet 10 inches (3.61 m) | 159 long tons (162 t) | |
| Ben Aden | | 338 | Steel | Trawler - Steam | 1900 | 106 feet 3 inches (32.39 m) | 21 feet 1 inch (6.43 m) | 12 feet 4 inches (3.76 m) | 176 long tons (179 t) | |
| Ben Lawers | | 339 | Steel | Trawler - Steam | 1900 | 106 feet 2 inches (32.36 m) | 21 feet 1 inch (6.43 m) | 11 feet 6 inches (3.51 m) | 176 long tons (179 t) | |
| Ben Voirlich | | 340 | Steel | Trawler - Steam | 1900 | 106 feet 3 inches (32.39 m) | 21 feet 1 inch (6.43 m) | 12 feet 4 inches (3.76 m) | 176 long tons (179 t) | |
| Rattray | | 341 | Steel | Trawler - Steam | 1900 | 110 feet 2 inches (33.58 m) | 21 feet 2 inches (6.45 m) | 11 feet 4 inches (3.45 m) | 182 long tons (185 t) | |
| Brucklay | | 342 | Steel | Trawler - Steam | 1900 | 110 feet 2 inches (33.58 m) | 21 feet 2 inches (6.45 m) | 11 feet 7 inches (3.53 m) | 182 long tons (185 t) | |
| Strathtay | | 343 | Steel | Trawler - Steam | 1901 | 108 feet 1 inch (32.94 m) | 21 feet 6 inches (6.55 m) | 11 feet 4 inches (3.45 m) | 185 long tons (188 t) | |
| Strathclyde | | 344 | Steel | Trawler - Steam | 1901 | 108 feet 2 inches (32.97 m) | 21 feet 6 inches (6.55 m) | 11 feet 4 inches (3.45 m) | 186 long tons (189 t) | |
| Nellie Nutten | | 345 | | Trawler - Steam | 1901 | 108 feet 3 inches (32.99 m) | 21 feet 7 inches (6.58 m) | 12 feet 1 inch (3.68 m) | 184 long tons (187 t) | |
| St. Rognvald | St. Rognvald (painting) | 346 | Steel | Passenger and Cargo | 1901 | 230 feet 1 inch (70.13 m) | 31 feet 2 inches (9.50 m) | 15 feet 5 inches (4.70 m) | 923 long tons (938 t) | |
| Unknown | | 347 | | Barge | 1901 | | | | | |
| Strathblane | | 348 | Steel | Trawler - Steam | 1901 | 108 feet 8 inches (33.12 m) | 21 feet 8 inches (6.60 m) | 11 feet 5 inches (3.48 m) | 186 long tons (189 t) | |
| Kampeduin | | 349 | Steel | Trawler - Steam | 1901 | 108 feet 7 inches (33.10 m) | 21 feet 8 inches (6.60 m) | 11 feet 5 inches (3.48 m) | 181 long tons (184 t) | |
| Harry Ross | | 350 | Steel | Trawler - Steam | 1901 | 110 feet 4 inches (33.63 m) | 21 feet 2 inches (6.45 m) | 11 feet 5 inches (3.48 m) | 183 long tons (186 t) | |
| Maggie Ross | | 351 | | Trawler - Steam | 1901 | 110 feet 3 inches (33.60 m) | 21 feet 1 inch (6.43 m) | 12 feet 1 inch (3.68 m) | 183 long tons (186 t) | |
| Loch Ryan | | 352 | Steel | Trawler - Steam | 1901 | 108 feet 1 inch (32.94 m) | 21 feet 7 inches (6.58 m) | 12 feet 1 inch (3.68 m) | 186 long tons (189 t) | |
| Loch Leven | | 353 | Steel | Trawler - Steam | 1901 | 106 feet 2 inches (32.36 m) | 21 feet 2 inches (6.45 m) | 11 feet 6 inches (3.51 m) | 178 long tons (181 t) | |
| Loch Rannoch | | 354 | Steel | Trawler - Steam | 1901 | 106 feet 2 inches (32.36 m) | 21 feet 2 inches (6.45 m) | 11 feet 6 inches (3.51 m) | 178 long tons (181 t) | |
| Ben Rinnes | | 355 | | Trawler - Steam | 1901 | 108 feet (33 m) | 21 feet (6.4 m) | 12 feet 4 inches (3.76 m) | 183 long tons (186 t) | |
| Windsor Castle | | 356 | | Trawler - Steam | 1901 | 108 feet 3 inches (32.99 m) | 21 feet 1 inch (6.43 m) | 12 feet 4 inches (3.76 m) | 183 long tons (186 t) | |
| Columbia | | 357 | Steel | Trawler - Steam | 1902 | 108 feet 2 inches (32.97 m) | 21 feet 2 inches (6.45 m) | 11 feet 7 inches (3.53 m) | 183 long tons (186 t) | |
| Ben Edra | | 358 | | Trawler - Steam | 1902 | 108 feet 3 inches (32.99 m) | 21 feet 1 inch (6.43 m) | 12 feet 4 inches (3.76 m) | 183 long tons (186 t) | |
| Aberlour | | 359 | Steel | Cargo Steamer (Schooner) | 1902 | 365 feet 2 inches (111.30 m) | 48 feet 2 inches (14.68 m) | 20 feet 4 inches (6.20 m) | 4,194 long tons (4,261 t) | |
| Ingane | | 360 | Iron and Steel | Tug (Twin Screw) | 1902 | 110 feet 1 inch (33.55 m) | 23 feet 1 inch (7.04 m) | 11 feet (3.4 m) | 216 long tons (219 t) | |
| Inkosi | | 361 | Steel | Passenger and Cargo | 1902 | 350 feet 2 inches (106.73 m) | 43 feet 3 inches (13.18 m) | 20 feet (6.1 m) | 3,576 long tons (3,633 t) | |
| Fort George | | 362 | Steel | Trawler - Steam | 1902 | 108 feet 5 inches (33.05 m) | 21 feet 7 inches (6.58 m) | 11 feet 6 inches (3.51 m) | 180 long tons (180 t) | |
| Star of the North | | 363 | Steel | Trawler - Steam | 1903 | 112 feet 2 inches (34.19 m) | 21 feet 6 inches (6.55 m) | 11 feet 9 inches (3.58 m) | 192 long tons (195 t) | |
| Star of the South | | 364 | Steel | Trawler - Steam | 1903 | 112 feet 1 inch (34.16 m) | 21 feet 6 inches (6.55 m) | 12 feet (3.7 m) | 182 long tons (185 t) | |
| Balnagask | | 365 | | Trawler - Steam | 1903 | 108 feet 3 inches (32.99 m) | 21 feet 7 inches (6.58 m) | 12 feet 1 inch (3.68 m) | 190 long tons (190 t) | |
| Loch Strom | | 366 | | Trawler - Steam | 1903 | 106 feet 3 inches (32.39 m) | 21 feet 1 inch (6.43 m) | 12 feet 4 inches (3.76 m) | 176 long tons (179 t) | |
| Fort William | | 367 | Steel | Trawler - Steam | 1903 | 112 feet 1 inch (34.16 m) | 21 feet 6 inches (6.55 m) | 11 feet 5 inches (3.48 m) | 178 long tons (181 t) | |
| Conductor | | 368 | Steel | Trawler - Steam | 1903 | 112 feet 2 inches (34.19 m) | 21 feet 1 inch (6.43 m) | 11 feet 5 inches (3.48 m) | 163 long tons (166 t) | |
| Companion | | 369 | Steel | Trawler - Steam | 1903 | 112 feet 1 inch (34.16 m) | 21 feet 1 inch (6.43 m) | 11 feet 5 inches (3.48 m) | 163 long tons (166 t) | |
| Sapphire | | 370 | | Liner (Fishing) | 1903 | 103 feet 3 inches (31.47 m) | 21 feet 1 inch (6.43 m) | 11 feet 6 inches (3.51 m) | 156 long tons (159 t) | |
| St. Giles | | 371 | Steel | Passenger and Cargo | 1903 | 190 feet 6 inches (58.06 m) | 28 feet 1 inch (8.56 m) | 14 feet 1 inch (4.29 m) | 609 long tons (619 t) | |
| Hunter | | 372 | Steel | Trawler - Steam | 1903 | 112 feet 2 inches (34.19 m) | 21 feet 6 inches (6.55 m) | 12 feet 1 inch (3.68 m) | 185 long tons (188 t) | |
| Strathmartin | | 373 | | Trawler - Steam | 1903 | 110 feet 3 inches (33.60 m) | 21 feet 10 inches (6.65 m) | 12 feet 7 inches (3.84 m) | 195 long tons (198 t) | |
| Strathcarron | | 374 | | Trawler - Steam | 1903 | 110 feet 3 inches (33.60 m) | 21 feet 10 inches (6.65 m) | 12 feet 7 inches (3.84 m) | 196 long tons (199 t) | |
| Star of the Ocean | | 375 | Steel | Trawler - Steam | 1903 | 115 feet 1 inch (35.08 m) | 21 feet 8 inches (6.60 m) | 12 feet 1 inch (3.68 m) | 203 long tons (206 t) | |
| Clan Gordon | | 376 | | Trawler - Steam | 1903 | 112 feet 3 inches (34.21 m) | 21 feet 7 inches (6.58 m) | 12 feet 10 inches (3.91 m) | 197 long tons (200 t) | |
| Rubislaw | | 377 | Steel | Trawler - Steam | 1903 | 115 feet 5 inches (35.18 m) | 21 feet 6 inches (6.55 m) | 12 feet (3.7 m) | 192 long tons (195 t) | |
| Thrift | | 378 | Steel | Cargo - Collier (Coal) | 1904 | 168 feet 6 inches (51.36 m) | 26 feet 1 inch (7.95 m) | 10 feet 5 inches (3.18 m) | 506 long tons (514 t) | |
| Inanda | | 379 | Steel | Cargo Steamer | 1904 | 370 feet (110 m) | 46 feet 2 inches (14.07 m) | 18 feet 5 inches (5.61 m) | 4,233 long tons (4,301 t) | |
| Rose | | 380 | Iron and Steel | Tug (Twin Screw) | 1904 | 140 feet 1 inch (42.70 m) | 26 feet 1 inch (7.95 m) | 13 feet 1 inch (3.99 m) | 308 long tons (313 t) | |
| Freya | | 381 | Steel | Fisheries Protection Vessel (Civilian) Trawler | 1904 | 86 feet 4 inches (26.31 m) | 18 feet 6 inches (5.64 m) | 9 feet 3 inches (2.82 m) | 96 long tons (98 t) | |
| Rubislaw | | 382 | Steel | Cargo Steamer | 1904 | 220 feet 2 inches (67.11 m) | 32 feet 2 inches (9.80 m) | 14 feet 8 inches (4.47 m) | 1,023 long tons (1,039 t) | |
| Centurion | | 383 | Steel | Trawler - Steam | 1904 | 107 feet 3 inches (32.69 m) | 20 feet 7 inches (6.27 m) | 12 feet 1 inch (3.68 m) | 190 long tons (190 t) | |
| Chancellor | | 384 | Steel | Trawler - Steam | 1904 | 105 feet 3 inches (32.08 m) | 20 feet 6 inches (6.25 m) | 11 feet 9 inches (3.58 m) | 156 long tons (159 t) | |
| Cetonia | | 385 | Steel | Trawler - Steam | 1905 | 110 feet 2 inches (33.58 m) | 21 feet 1 inch (6.43 m) | 11 feet 4 inches (3.45 m) | 177 long tons (180 t) | |
| Terrier | | 386 | Steel | Trawler - Steam | 1905 | 108 feet 5 inches (33.05 m) | 21 feet 7 inches (6.58 m) | 11 feet 3 inches (3.43 m) | 179 long tons (182 t) | |
| Commissioner | | 387 | Steel | Trawler - Steam | 1905 | 112 feet 1 inch (34.16 m) | 21 feet 1 inch (6.43 m) | 11 feet 1 inch (3.38 m) | 161 long tons (164 t) | |
| Chamberlain | | 388 | Steel | Trawler - Steam | 1905 | 112 feet 2 inches (34.19 m) | 21 feet 1 inch (6.43 m) | 11 feet 1 inch (3.38 m) | 161 long tons (164 t) | |
| Burnbanks | | 389 | Steel | Trawler - Steam | 1905 | 110 feet 2 inches (33.58 m) | 21 feet 8 inches (6.60 m) | 11 feet 7 inches (3.53 m) | 193 long tons (196 t) | |
| Strathairlie | | 390 | Steel | Trawler - Steam | 1905 | 110 feet 2 inches (33.58 m) | 21 feet 9 inches (6.63 m) | 11 feet 7 inches (3.53 m) | 193 long tons (196 t) | |
| Koon Shing | | 391 | Steel | Passenger and Cargo | 1905 | 265 feet (81 m) | 40 feet 2 inches (12.24 m) | 21 feet 1 inch (6.43 m) | 2,130 long tons (2,160 t) | |
| Strathyre | | 392 | | Trawler - Steam | 1905 | 110 feet 3 inches (33.60 m) | 21 feet 10 inches (6.65 m) | 12 feet 7 inches (3.84 m) | 193 long tons (196 t) | |
| Chip Shing | | 393 | Steel | Cargo Steamer | 1906 | 265 feet (81 m) | 40 feet 2 inches (12.24 m) | 21 feet 0 inches (6.40 m) | 1,984 long tons (2,016 t) | |
| Strathord | | 394 | | Trawler - Steam | 1906 | 110 feet 3 inches (33.60 m) | 21 feet 10 inches (6.65 m) | 12 feet 7 inches (3.84 m) | 195 long tons (198 t) | |
| Pointer | | 395 | Steel | Trawler - Steam | 1906 | 110 feet 3 inches (33.60 m) | 21 feet 8 inches (6.60 m) | 11 feet 7 inches (3.53 m) | 198 long tons (201 t) | |
| Strathfillan | | 396 | | Trawler - Steam | 1906 | 110 feet 3 inches (33.60 m) | 21 feet 10 inches (6.65 m) | 12 feet 7 inches (3.84 m) | 195 long tons (198 t) | |
| Strathdee | | 397 | Steel | Trawler - Steam | 1906 | 110 feet 5 inches (33.66 m) | 21 feet 8 inches (6.60 m) | 11 feet 7 inches (3.53 m) | 193 long tons (196 t) | |
| Adventure | | 398 | | Trawler - Steam | 1906 | 110 feet (34 m) | 21 feet 8 inches (6.60 m) | 12 feet 3 inches (3.73 m) | 184 long tons (187 t) | |
| Swallow | | 400 | Steel | Trawler - Steam | 1906 | 115 feet 3 inches (35.13 m) | 21 feet 9 inches (6.63 m) | 12 feet 2 inches (3.71 m) | 204 long tons (207 t) | |

== Notes ==
- Where available, vessel measurements taken from Lloyd's Register, giving registered length, beam and draft. Hall, Russell and Company's own measurements typically are length overall, beam and moulded depth.
- Rubislaw used on two distinct vessels at the same time - one a fishing vessel, the other a cargo vessel.
- Yard Number 399 not used.
