= Music based on the works of Oscar Wilde =

This is an incomplete list of music based on the works of Oscar Wilde.

Oscar Wilde was an Irish playwright, poet, novelist, short story writer and wit, whose works have been the basis of a considerable number of musical works by noted composers. In classical genres, these include operas, ballets, incidental music, symphonic poems, orchestral suites and single pieces, cantatas, and songs and song cycles. Of more recent times, some have been the subject of musicals and film scores. Some are direct settings of Wilde's words or librettos based on them, and some are wordless settings inspired by his writings.

== List of works ==
The works of Oscar Wilde that have been set to music include:

=== The Ballad of Reading Gaol ===
Poem

Composer	Title	Genre	Date	Notes
Grant Foster	The Ballad of Reading Gaol	tenor and piano	2012	premiered in Saint Petersburg, Russia, by Andrew Goodwin and Mira Yevtich
Gavin Friday, Maurice Seezer	Each Man Kills The Thing He Loves	song	1989	
Jacques Ibert	La Ballade de la geôle de Reading	ballet	1920	published in a version by Ibert for piano duet in 1924
King Charles	Wilde Love	song	2012	Off the Loveblood CD, the song contains several verses from the poem in the chorus
Donald Swann	The Poetic Image: A Victorian Song Cycle	song cycle	1991	Swann set certain parts of the Ballad, along with The Harlot's House and other texts by Tennyson, Christina Rossetti, and John Clare
Arthur Wills	The Sacrifice of God	choral	1986	4-part choir and organ; words from Psalm 51 and The Ballad of Reading Gaol; composed on the death of the composer's young niece
Henri Zagwijn		declamation with music		in Dutch

Pete Doherty quotes the stanza beginning with "I never saw a man who looked/with such a wistful eye" in Broken Love Song on his solo album Grace/Wastelands.

=== Les Ballons ===
Les Ballons (The Balloons) is a short poem, the second of the two Fantaisies Décoratives, the first being Le Panneau (The Panel).

Composer	Title	Genre	Date	Notes
Charles Tomlinson Griffes	Les Ballons	song	c. 1912	Griffes composed a song to this text in c. 1912, revising it in 1915. It was published in 1986.

=== The Birthday of the Infanta ===
Short story

Composer	Title	Genre	Date	Notes
John Alden Carpenter	The Birthday of the Infanta	ballet	1919	
Mario Castelnuovo-Tedesco	The Birthday of the Infanta, Op. 115	ballet	1942	premiered New Orleans, 1947; an orchestral suite was produced in 1944
Wolfgang Fortner	Die weisse Rose (The White Rose)	ballet	1949–50	
Elisabeth Lutyens	The Birthday of the Infanta	ballet	1932	
Miklós Radnai	Az infánsznö születésnapja (The Birthday of the Infanta)	ballet	1918	premiered Budapest Opera House, 26 April 1918
Franz Schreker	Der Geburtstag der Infantin	ballet-pantomime	1908	rev. as Spanisches Fest, 1923
Franz Schreker	Spanisches Fest (Spanish Festival)	ballet-pantomime	1923	revised version of Der Geburtstag der Infantin, 1908
Bernhard Sekles	Der Zwerg und die Infantin (The Dwarf and the Infanta), Op. 22	ballet	1913	
Alexander von Zemlinsky	Der Zwerg (The Dwarf), Op. 17	opera	1919–21	libretto by George C. Klaren based on Wilde (although he took many liberties); premiered Neues Theater, Cologne, 28 May 1922, conducted by Otto Klemperer; in 1981 a new production by director Adolf Dresen was staged in Hamburg – this did away with Klaren's textual changes and was presented as Der Geburtstag der Infantin
Otakar Zítek	O růzi (On the Rose)	ballet	1941–42	Zítek 1894–1955

=== The Canterville Ghost ===
Short story (1887)

Composer	Title	Genre	Date	Notes
George Bassman	The Canterville Ghost	film score	1944	
Alexander Knaifel	The Canterville Ghost	opera	1966	
Jaroslav Křička	Bily pan (The Gentleman in White), Op. 30	opera	1927–29	2 acts, with libretto by Jan Löwenbach-Budin; a 3-act version Spuk im Schloss was produced in 1931
Jaroslav Křička	Spuk im Schloss, oder Böse Zeiten fur Gespenster	opera	1931	3 acts; a revised version of his 2-act 1929 opera Bily pan
Heinrich Sutermeister	Das Gespenst von Canterville	television opera	1964	telecast by ZDF, Mainz
Sergei Vasilenko	The Garden of Death ("after Oscar Wilde"), Op. 13	symphonic poem	1907–08	Vasilenko's title is sometimes said to have come from one of Wilde's poems, but he wrote no such poem. It comes from a passage in Chapter V of The Canterville Ghost where the character Virginia is speaking with the eponymous ghost and asks it where it sleeps. It talks about a certain garden. She whispers: You mean the Garden of Death, and it answers, Yes, Death. Wilde's lover, Lord Alfred Douglas, whom he did not meet until 1891, later used The Garden of Death as the title of one of his own sonnets, published in 1899 in the collection "The City of the Soul".
	"The Canterville Prophecy" (instrumental) and "The Canterville Ghost"	popular music	2004	Recorded by Austrian metal band Edenbridge on their 2004 album "Shine".

=== De Profundis ===
Letter

Composer	Title	Genre	Date	Notes
Frederic Rzewski	De Profundis	speaking pianist	1992	The pianist speaks and sings excerpts from Wilde's letter
Larry Sitsky	De Profundis. Epistola: in Carcere et Vinculus	monodrama	c. 1982	Wilde's words arranged into a libretto by Gwen Harwood; for baritone, two string quartets and one percussion player

=== Endymion ===
Poem

Composer	Title	Genre	Date	Notes
Joseph Horovitz	Endymion	solo voice and chorus	1985	soprano and chamber choir

=== E Tenebris ===
Poem. Included in his collection Rosa Mystica.

Composer	Title	Genre	Date	Notes
Erwin Schulhoff	E tenebris, Op. 15, No. 3	song	1914	No. 3 of Rosa Mystica, three songs to Wilde texts for alto voice and piano, Op. 15 (WV 33). The other two songs are Madonna mia (No. 1) and Requiescat (No. 2).

=== A Florentine Tragedy ===
Blank verse play. Premiered not in England, but at the Deutsches Theater in Berlin, 12 January 1906, in a German translation by Max Meyerfeld. The London premiere was on 10 June 1906.

Composer	Title	Genre	Date	Notes
Sergei Prokofiev	Maddalena, Op. 13	opera	1911–13	1 act; his own libretto, after a blank verse play by Baroness Liven (Magda Gustavovna Liven-Orlova), which was based on Wilde's play; composed 1911, partly orchestrated 1912, revised 1913; never performed in Prokofiev's lifetime, despite some attempts; his widow Lina asked Edward Downes to complete it in 1976; concert reading, Manchester, 22 December 1978, under Downes, for a BBC radio broadcast on 25 March 1979; premiere stage performance Graz Opernhouse, 28 November 1981
Alexander von Zemlinsky	Eine florentinische Tragödie, Op. 16	opera	1915–16	trans. Max Meyerfeld; premiered Stuttgart 30 January 1917, conducted by Max von Schillings; it was the fifth and most successful of Zemlinsky's seven completed operas and is among the key works of his oeuvre

=== La Fuite de la Lune ===
La Fuite de la Lune (The Flight of the Moon) is the second of the two poems in Impressions, the first being Les Silhouettes.

Composer	Title	Genre	Date	Notes
Charles Griffes	La Fuite de la Lune	song	1912	Griffes wrote a setting of this poem as No. 1 of his Tone-Images, Op. 3 (No. 2 was also a Wilde setting, Symphony in Yellow; and No. 3 was a poem by W. E. Henley).

=== The Happy Prince ===
Short story

Composer	Title	Genre	Date	Notes
Renzo Bossi	Il Principe felice, Op. 52	radio opera	1950	1 act; broadcast 11 October 1951, RAI; libretto by Bossi after Wilde
Henry Hadley	The Golden Prince, Op. 69	cantata	1914	Soprano, baritone, SSAA chorus, orchestra; libretto by D. Stevens after Wilde; presented New York 1914
Bernard Herrmann	The Happy Prince	music for a narration	1945	for a recording of the story spoken by Bing Crosby and Orson Welles, with an orchestra conducted by Victor Young
Malcolm Williamson	The Happy Prince	opera	c. 1965	1 act; libretto adapted by the composer
Luis de Arquer	The Happy Prince	Piano- Music for a Journey	c. 2000	
Stephen DeCesare	The Happy Prince	Musical Theatre (published at MTA Publishing)	c. 2013	www.mtapublishing.com

=== The Harlot's House ===
Poem

Composer	Title	Genre	Date	Notes
Ronald Stevenson	The Harlot's House – Dance Poem after Oscar Wilde	chamber	1988	Free-bass accordion, timpani and percussion
Donald Swann	The Poetic Image: A Victorian Song Cycle	song cycle	1991	Swann set The Harlot's House, along with extracts from The Ballad of Reading Gaol and other texts by Alfred, Lord Tennyson, Christina Rossetti, and John Clare

=== An Ideal Husband ===
Play

Composer	Title	Genre	Date	Notes
Arthur Benjamin	An Ideal Husband	film score	1947	
Edison Denisov	An Ideal Husband	film score	1980	

=== The Importance of Being Earnest ===
Play

Composer	Title	Genre	Date	Notes
Erik Chisholm	The Importance of Being Earnest	opera	1963	
Vivian Ellis	Half in Ernest	musical	1958	
Benjamin Frankel	The Importance of Being Earnest	film score	1952	
Lee Pockriss, Anne Croswell	Ernest in Love	musical	1960	
Gerald Barry	The Importance of Being Earnest	opera	2011	

=== Impression du matin ===
Poem

Composer	Title	Genre	Date	Notes
Charles Griffes	Impression du matin	song	1915	Griffes included this song in his Four Impressions, all settings of Wilde poems (the other three were La Mer, Le Jardin, and Impression: Le Réveillon, which he set as Le Réveillon). Four Impressions was not published until c. 1970.

=== Impression: Le Réveillon ===
Poem

Composer	Title	Genre	Date	Notes
Charles Griffes	Le Réveillon	song	1914	Griffes included this song in his Four Impressions, all settings of Wilde poems (the other three were La Mer, Le Jardin, and Impression du matin). Griffes altered the last line of the poem, changing the word "streaked" to "flushed". Four Impressions was not published until c. 1970.

=== Le Jardin ===
Poem

Composer	Title	Genre	Date	Notes
Charles Griffes	Le Jardin	song	1915	Griffes included this song in his Four Impressions, all settings of Wilde poems (the other three were La Mer, Impression du matin, and Impression: Le Réveillon, which he set as Le Réveillon). Four Impressions was not published until c. 1970.

=== Lady Windermere's Fan ===
Play

Composer	Title	Genre	Date	Notes
Noël Coward	After the Ball	play with music	1954	play adapted by Coward, who also wrote the music

=== Lord Arthur Savile's Crime ===
Short story

Composer	Title	Genre	Date	Notes
Geoffrey Bush	Lord Arthur Savile's Crime	opera	1972	premiered London, Guildhall School of Music, 5 December 1972
Edwin Carr	Lord Arthur Savile's Crime	opera	1991	1 act, 8 scenes
Alexandre Tansman	Flesh and Fantasy	film score	1943	only the 2nd part of the 3-part film is based on Wilde's story

=== Madonna mia ===
Poem. Included in his collection Rosa Mystica.

Composer	Title	Genre	Date	Notes
Erwin Schulhoff	"Madonna mia", Op. 15, No. 1	song	1914	No. 1 of Rosa Mystica, three songs to Wilde texts for alto voice and piano, Op. 15 (WV 33). The other two songs are "Requiescat" (No. 2) and "E tenebris" (No. 3)

=== La Mer ===
Poem

Composer	Title	Genre	Date	Notes
Charles Griffes	La Mer	song	1916	Griffes first sketched La Mer on 29 October 1912. After its publication was rejected by Schirmers, he wrote an entirely new setting in August 1916. It was included in his Four Impressions, all settings of Wilde poems (the other three were Le Jardin, Impression du matin, and Impression: Le Réveillon, which he set as Le Réveillon). Four Impressions was not published until c. 1970.

=== The Nightingale and the Rose ===
Story

Composer	Title	Genre	Date	Notes
Renzo Bossi	Rosa rossa (Red Rose), Op. 18	opera	1910	also seen as L'Usinguolo e la rosa (The Nightingale and the Rose); one act; Bossi described it as a "poemetto lirico"; staged Turin 1938
Hooper Brewster-Jones	The Nightingale and the Rose	opera	1927	only an orchestral suite survives
Elena Firsova	The Nightingale and the Rose, Op. 46	chamber opera	1990–91	to her own English libretto based partly on Wilde's story, and partly on poetry by Christina Rossetti
Harold Fraser-Simson	The Nightingale and the Rose	ballet	1927	
Margaret Garwood	The Nightingale and the Rose	opera	1973	
Henry Hadley	The Nightingale and the Rose, Op. 54	cantata	1911	soprano solo, SSAA chorus, orchestra; libretto by E. W. Grant; performed New York 1911
Philip Hagemann	The Nightingale and the Rose	opera	2003	
Roger Hannay	The Nightingale and the Rose	stage and mixed media	1986	
Janis Kalnins	The Nightingale and the Rose	ballet	1938	
Jan Müller-Wieland	The Nightingale and the Rose	chamber opera	1996	1 act; 7 singers, percussion (3 gongs, 3 tamtams, marimba, vibraphone), cello or piano, 2 violins, viola, cello, double bass; staged Darmstadt 1996
Bright Sheng	The Nightingale and the Rose	ballet	2007	
Jonathan Rutherford	The Nightingale and the Rose	opera	1966	
Friedrich Voss	The Nightingale and the Rose	ballet	1961	staged Oberhausen 1962
Saltatio Mortis	Nachtigall und Rose	Medieval metal	2011	
Aziza Mustafa Zadeh	The Nightingale & The Rose	Jazz composition	2006	

=== The Picture of Dorian Gray ===
Novel (1890)

Composer	Title	Genre	Date	Notes
Boris Arapov	The Picture of Dorian Gray	ballet	1971	
Lowell Liebermann	The Picture of Dorian Gray	opera	1996	12 scenes; libretto by Liebermann based on the novel; commissioned by Opera Monte Carlo; premiered Salle Garnier, Monaco, 8 May 1996; dedicated to Princess Caroline of Monaco; US premiere, Florentine Opera, Milwaukee, Wisconsin, 5 February 1999
W. Arundel Orchard	The Picture of Dorian Gray	opera		3 acts; performed at the New South Wales State Conservatorium of Music 11 September 2019; unpublished
Hans Schaeuble	Dorian Gray, Op. 32	opera	1947–48	
Herbert Stothart	The Picture of Dorian Gray	film score	1945	
Stephen DeCesare	The Picture of Dorian Gray	musical theatre	2005	Published at MTA Publishing
Randy Bowser	Dorian – the Remarkable Mister Gray	musical theatre	2008	Premiered in Salem, Oregon, in 2008; produced in Russian in Moscow, at the Stas Namin Theatre.

Popular music

- Post-punk band Television Personalities recorded a song titled "A Picture of Dorian Gray" for their 1981 album ...And Don't the Kids Just Love It. The song was covered by The Futureheads on their 2003 EP 1-2-3-Nul!.
- Prog band Nirvana (UK) released a 1981 single titled "The Picture of Dorian Gray".
- "Tears And Rain" by popstar James Blunt features the line: 'Hides my true shape, like Dorian Gray' from Back to Bedlam (2003)
- The Libertines' song "Narcissist", from their 2004 album The Libertines, includes the line in the chorus, 'Wouldn't it be nice to be Dorian Gray, just for a day'.
- Demons & Wizards recorded a song entitled "Dorian" on their 2005 album Touched by the Crimson King.
- Kill Hannah's song "Scream", from their 2006 album Until There's Nothing Left of Us, includes the line, 'Enacting Sybil Vane in some tragic play'.
- Styx's song "Sing for the Day" references the titular character with the line, 'ageless and timeless as Dorian Gray'.
- William Control titled a track on their 2010 album Noir after the protagonist
- "Ballad of Dorian Gray", a song by Michael Peter Smith
- "The Picture of Dorian Gray", a song by Cherry Five
- "Portrait", a song by Alt-J
- "Vincent", a song by Don McLean references Wilde's story "The Nightingale and the Rose" with the line "A silver thorn, a bloody rose".
- Gothic metal band Pyogenesis recorded a song titled "I Have Seen My Soul" based on the novel for their 2017 album "A Kingdom to Disappear"
- Doom metal band Pagan Altar recorded a song titled "The Portrait Of Dorian Gray" inspired by the novel for their album "A Room of Shadows" in 2017.

=== Requiescat ===
Poem (1874), included in his collection Rosa Mystica. Requiescat was written at Avignon seven years after his sister, Isola, died (23 February 1867), less than two months before her 10th birthday. Wilde was 12 at the time of her death.

Composer	Title	Genre	Date	Notes
George Butterworth	Requiescat	song	1911	
Luigi Dallapiccola	Requiescat	choral	1957–58	Chorus and orchestra; the text includes Wilde's poem as well as words taken from the Gospel of Matthew and James Joyce
Otto Luening	Requiscat	song	1917	
George Frederick McKay	Requiescat	song	1932	
Ned Rorem	Requiescat	vocal	1997	Set for SATB and piano; Evidence of Things Not Seen is a cycle of 36 songs to texts by 24 authors, and includes solos, duos, trios and quartets; Requiescat is No. 8 of the "Middles" section of the cycle; the other songs include texts by W. H. Auden, Charles Baudelaire, Robert and Elizabeth Barrett Browning, Colette, Stephen Crane, Paul Goodman, A. E. Housman, Langston Hughes, Rudyard Kipling, Edna St. Vincent Millay, Theodore Roethke, John Waldman, Walt Whitman, William Wordsworth and others; premiered Carnegie Hall, January 1998
Erwin Schulhoff	Requiescat, Op. 15, No. 2	song	1914	Set to German words (Still, dass sie es nicht hört ..); No. 2 of Rosa Mystica, three songs to Wilde texts for alto voice and piano, Op. 15 (WV 33). The other two songs are Madonna mia (No. 1) and E tenebris (No. 3)
David Van Vactor	Requiescat	song	1932	
Raymond Wilding-White	Requiescat			

=== La Sainte Courtisane ===
Play (fragment; 1893)

Composer	Title	Genre	Date	Notes
Rudolf Wagner-Régeny	La sainte courtisane	musical scene	1930	4 speakers and chamber orchestra; premiered Dessau, 24 October 1930
Leo-Neferuaten Boyle / Gavin Kaufman	La Sainte Courtisane	Pop song	1994	Appeared on the Leo-Neferuaten Boyle studio recorded demo albums, "The Return of the Topaz Tiger" (April 1994) and "The Total Topaz Tiger" (June 2006). A YouTube video of the song was created in April 2012.

=== Salome ===
Play

Composer	Title	Genre	Date	Notes
Henry Hadley	Salome, Op. 55	symphonic poem	1905	this was written after Hadley had seen a production of Oscar Wilde's play, and was a favourite among his own compositions
Richard Strauss	Salome, Op. 54	opera	1905	trans. Hedwig Lachmann; premiered Dresden 1905. This opera is by far the best known musical adaptation of a work of Oscar Wilde.
Antoine Mariotte	Salomé	opera	1905	premiered 1908; he was involved in a debate with Richard Strauss to prove that his music was written earlier than Strauss's version, also written in 1905

=== The Selfish Giant ===
Short story

Composer	Title	Genre	Date	Notes
Eric Coates	The Selfish Giant – A Phantasy	orchestra	1925	
Dan Goeller	The Selfish Giant	orchestra	2011	Official website Children's book/CD, with illustrations by Chris Beatrice
Jenő Hubay	Az önző óriás (Ger. Der selbstsüchtige Riese; Eng. The Selfish Giant), Op. 124	opera	1934	1 act; libretto by László Márkus and Jenő Mohácsi after the story by Wilde
Graeme Koehne	The Selfish Giant	ballet	1983	choreography by Graeme Murphy
Jim and Dee Patton	The Selfish Giant	Rock opera	2008	Official website Performed by Bongo and the Point
Stephen DeCesare	The Selfish Giant	Musical theatre	2010	Published by MTA Publishing

=== Sonnet on hearing the Dies Irae sung in the Sistine Chapel ===
Poem

Composer	Title	Genre	Date	Notes
Malcolm Williamson	Sonnet: On hearing the Dies Irae sung in the Sistine Chapel	chorus a cappella	c. 1969	

=== The Sphinx ===
Poem

Composer	Title	Genre	Date	Notes
Granville Bantock	The Sphinx	song cycle	1941	for baritone or contralto with orchestra
Alexander Mosolov	The Sphinx	cantata	1925	set to a Russian translation of Wilde's poem as a graduation exercise

=== Symphony in Yellow ===
Poem

Composer	Title	Genre	Date	Notes
Charles Griffes	Symphony in Yellow	song	1912	Griffes wrote a setting of this in c. 1912, as No. 2 of his Tone-Images, Op. 3 (No. 1 was also a Wilde setting, La Fuite de la Lune; and No. 3 was a poem by W. E. Henley).

=== Poisoned Youth ===
Song

Composer	Title	Genre	Year	Notes
England (band): Martin Henderson, Frank Holland, Jode Leigh, Robert Webb	Poisoned Youth	Progressive Rock	1977	From the album "Garden Shed"

=== Unclassified ===
Composer	Title	Genre	Date	Notes
Pierre Capdevielle	Deux Apologues d'Oscar Wilde (Two Moral Stories of Oscar Wilde)	recitation for voice and orchestra	1930–32	
Francis George Scott	Idyll	song		unpublished

== Sources ==
- Eric Blom ed., Grove's Dictionary of Music and Musicians, 5th ed., 1954
