= The Bonding (album) =

Studio album by Edenbridge
- Released: 2 July 2013
- Genre: Gothic metal, symphonic metal
- Length: 58:28
- Label: SPV
- Producer: Arne "Lanvall" Stockhammer

Edenbridge chronology
Solitaire (2010)	The Bonding (2013)	The Great Momentum (2017)

The Bonding is the eighth studio album by the Austrian symphonic metal band Edenbridge. It was released in July 2013 on the SPV label after both singer Sabine Edelsbacher and the band's mastermind "Lanvall" Stockhammer had suffered personal losses. Bassist Wolfgang Rothbauer who formerly played for Disbelief and Zombie Inc. had joined Edenbridge for the recording.

== Reception ==
Professional ratings
Review scores
Source	Rating
About.com	3.5/5 stars
Rock Hard	7.5

The album received mixed to positive reviews. About.com interpreted the album and its track titles as a way of coping with Edelsbacher's and Stockhammer's family losses, and noted the band's professionalism and musical craftsmanship. In a split review by two authors, the German Rock Hard magazine lauded the song lines but also criticised the album for being kitschy and lacking guitar elements. The Sonic Seducer wrote that The Bonding surpassed the previous release MyEarthDream which was likewise recorded with a full symphonic orchestra.

== Track listing ==
All tracks are written by Lanvall.

No.	Title	Length
1.	"Mystic River"	7:13
2.	"Alight a New Tomorrow"	3:53
3.	"Star-Crossed Dreamer"	4:01
4.	"The Invisible Force"	5:27
5.	"Into a Sea of Souls"	4:57
6.	"Far Out of Reach"	6:09
7.	"Shadows of My Memory"	5:37
8.	"Death Is Not the End"	5:45
9.	"The Bonding"	15:26
Total length:		58:28

== Personnel ==
=== Band members ===
- Sabine Edelsbacher – vocals
- Lanvall – lead and rhythm guitars, bass guitar, keyboards, piano, acoustic guitars, kacapi
- Max Pointner – drums
- Dominik Sebastian – lead and rhythm guitars
- Wolfgang Rothbauer – bass guitar, grunts on "Shadows of my memory"

=== Guest musicians ===
- Erik Martensson – lead vocals on "The Bonding"
- Robby Valentine – backing vocals & choirs
- Klangvereinigung orchestra

=== Production ===
- Orchestral score by Lanvall
- Produced by Lanvall
- Mixed by Karl Groom
- Mastered by Mika Jussila
- Cover design by Anthony Clarkson
- Layout design by Reinhard Schmid
