= Marius Monnikendam =

Dutch composer (1896–1977)

- Born: Marinus Adrianus Monnikendam; 28 May 1896; Haarlem, Netherlands
- Died: 22 May 1977 (aged 80); Heerlen, Netherlands
- Occupations: Composer; organist; publicist

Marius Monnikendam: Toccata I (1936): first ten bars

Marinus Adrianus (Marius) Monnikendam (28 May 1896 – 22 May 1977) was a Dutch composer, organist, and music critic. He studied at the Amsterdam Conservatory. In 1925 Monnikendam went to Paris and attended Vincent d’Indy's Schola Cantorum. During this time, he published his first works for piano and cello. He then became a lecturer at the Rotterdam Conservatory and the Amsterdam Music Lyceum. Monnikendam composed mostly religious and secular works. He also published books on César Franck and Igor Stravinsky. His Lamentations of Jeremiah for chorus and orchestra, written in 1956 was broadcast by Radio Holland during the funeral services for both former Queen Wilhelmine (1962) and President John F. Kennedy (1963). His most popular work is the Toccata for Organ (1936).

His son was film director Vincent Monnikendam.

== Life ==
He was the son of diamond worker Juda Monnikendam and Catharina Cornelia Bierboom. As a child he lived opposite a church with a Cavaillé-Coll organ, which he often visited and which had a lasting influence on his future career as an organ composer. At the age of 11 he went to the boarding school and gymnasium of the Fathers of Monfort at Schimmert, where there was only a pump organ, on which a lot of Bach was played, which was a new revelation for him.

Monnikendam studied at the Amsterdam Conservatory with Sem Dresden and Jean-Baptiste de Pauw. In 1925, thanks to a scholarship from the state, he was able to study composition at the Schola Cantorum de Paris with Vincent d'Indy and Louis Aubert. He then became a teacher at the Rotterdam Conservatory and the Amsterdam Music Lyceum. In 1932 he switched to the Rotterdam Catholic daily newspaper "De Maasbode", of which he was music editor until the early 1960s, even after the merger with "De Tijd". He was also active as a composer of religious and profane works. Throughout his life Marius Monnikendam wrote many articles and books on music, including biographies of Igor Stravinsky and César Franck.

In 1933 he married Anna Maria Anthonia van Gendt. Marius Monnikendam received the Gilded Medal of the French Société Académique Arts-Sciences-Lettres, was Officier d'Académie in the French Ordre des Palmes académiques, Knight in the Order of St. Gregory the Great and Knight in the Order of Orange-Nassau. He died during the return journey from Bonn, where he held a concert with Haga Cantare to The Hague. During the transfer to Heerlen railway station, he collapsed as a result of a heart attack and died on the platform.

== Composer ==
As a composer Marius Monnikendam never conformed to any musical trend in particular. Most of his works were commissioned. He felt most at home when composing special commissions. This is applicable to his work for the concert podium as much as to his Lay-music of the Thirties (canons, Christmas carols and his stage music, e.g. Vondel). The practicability of his choir works is of utmost importance for amateurs. In his choice of text he has a strong preference for religion and liturgy. At the same time he feels very much attracted to the organ. During his study in Paris he became deeply interested in César Franck. He also admired Milhaud and Honegger, and as far as organ music is concerned, Charles Tournemire as well.

=== A Composer of Church Music ===
For a Convention of church music in Frankfurt am Main in 1928 he sent in a Missa Nova, which received great acclaim because of its advanced style, however the Ecclesiastical Authorities did not give their seal of approval. Only after the Second World War Monnikendam did write church music again: a Missa Festiva and in 1961 a Missa Solemnis. Due to the introduction of Dutch language into liturgy, Monnikendam wrote a Whitsun Mass in 1966. He composed his Via Sacra in 1969 for boys' choir, mixed choir, declamation, organ, percussion and light images, projected on a large film screen, with expressionistic passion drawings by Aad de Haas. The Via Sacra is meant to be a quaresimal sermon, not for liturgical use, but for the Catholic and Protestant church as well. The first performance was in 1970 and after that many times in Holland (The Hague, Amsterdam, Oldenzaal) en abroad (Brussels, Madison, New York City, Philadelphia).

=== Composer for Organ ===
A great deal of Monnikendam's work is taken up by organ compositions. His first Toccata (1936) is dedicated to maestro Charles Tournemire. In 1938 he wrote his first concert for organ in a modern baroque style and was performed in Amsterdam. In his Concerto for Organ and Brass Quartet (1956), an eighteenth century competitive style can be recognized. His sparkling virtuoso Third Concert for Organ (1968) with brass and percussion was very well received in the US. American editors started to become interested in Monnikendam (Inventions for Organ, 1961 and 1965).

=== Composer for Orchestra ===
Monnikendam did not write Symphonies but rather "Symphonic Movements", where a close musical structure is developed from a basic thought in a dynamic-motor fashion (compare Honegger's Pacific 231). His first work in this genre was Arbeid (Labour, 1931), followed by Mouvement Symphonique.

An old Dutch folksong ‘Merck toch hoe Sterck’ was transformed twice by Monnikendam: first in a Sinfonia (1943) and secondly as Symphonic Variations (1954). The Concerto for Trumpet, Horn and Orchestra could be considered as a pendant of his concerto’s for organ, where he lays a bridge across the eighteenth and twentieth century.

=== Composer for Choirs ===
Monnikendam attempted to reach a big audience by choosing texts of an evocative character for his choir works. As an example of this he composed three different versions of the "Te Deum Laudamus". Compared with his first Te Deum, his second one shows a marked austerity and commitment. His third Te Deum (1961), written for male choir and orchestra, is strongly influenced by Stravinsky and Orff. In his seven Poet Psalms (1934) Monnikendam linked various texts into one vocal-symphony whole. Also in the Lamentations of Jeremiah (1962), his text is arranged to a symphonic structure. His early Symphonia Sacra (1947) was based on Gregorian elements. His Magnificat was composed in two different versions. Monnikendam composed only a few secular choir works: Ballade des Pendus, Testament de l’ivrogne (both for male choir) and Madrigalesca for female choir and piano.

=== Composer for Oratorio ===
For the occasion of the commemoration of Jan van Riebeeck, founder of the South African Colony, Monnikendam wrote an oratorio for choir, children's choir, soloists and orchestra in 1952. From a text of the contemporary French poet Robert Morel, Monnikendam composed the tripartite oratorio: Noé, ou la destruction du premier monde (1955).

=== Last commissions ===
Till the end of his life, Monnikendam possesses an extremely lively mind and remained very active on all fronts. His creative powers remain undiminished. His final compositions were three commissioned works. The old Dutch mystery play "Everyman" (with a new modern text by Jan Engelman and an English translation by A. Barnouw) was written in two versions, one for male choir and one for mixed choir. Monnikendam received a second commission by the Dutch Heart Foundation. Based on the human heartbeat, Monnikendam wrote an instrumental work Heart-Rhythm (1975) in which a link is made with space travel. On the occasion of the reopening as a concert hall of the restored New Church of The Hague (end of 1976) Monnikendam composed a Gloria for mixed choir, orchestra, organ and percussion. The work was commissioned by the Johann Wagenaar Foundation.

== Works (selection) ==
The following list contains a selection of Monnikendam's compositions of which most of the manuscripts are in the Music Library of the Gemeentemuseum in The Hague, the Music Library of the Dutch Radio and Donemus (74 compositions;

=== Orchestral works ===
- Symfonic Movement Arbeid (1931)
- Concerto for organ and strings (1938)
- Sinfonia super "Merck toch hoe sterck", piano and chamber orchestra (1943)
- Mouvement symphonique (1950)
- Concerto for Trumpet and Horn (1952)
- Variations symphoniques (1954)
- Concerto for two Trumpets, two Trombones and Organ (1956)
- Overture, for Grand Organ and Orchestra (1960)
- Vision, for chamber orchestra (1963)
- Suite, for orchestra (1963)
- Variations symphoniques super "Merck toch hoe sterck", for orchestra (1963)
- Concerto for piano and orchestra (1974)
- Concerto for organ and chamber orchestra (1977)

==== Oratorio ====
- Noé ou La destruction du premier monde, for 2 narrators, soprano, alto, baritone, mixed koor, boys choir (SA) and orchestra (1955) – text: Robert Morel

==== Works for choir ====
- Magnificat, for male choir (TTBB) and organ (1923)
- Missa Nova, for three-part mixed choir (STB) and organ (1928)
- Laudate Dominum, for two-part male choir and organ (1934)
- Boetpsalmen (Penance Psalms) (1938)
- Ave Maria, for five-part mixed choir (SATBrB) and organ (1943)
- Missa parvulorum, a duabus choris organo comitante (1944)
- Te Deum, for mixed choir and orchestra (1945)
- Sinfonia Sacra (1947–52)
- Ballade des Pendus (1949)
- Litaniae Lauretaniae, for four-part male choir and organ (1951)
- Missa parvulorum a duabus choris organo comitante (1951)
- Missa festiva, for mixed choir, organ, trumpet and trombone ad libitum (1954)
- Magnificat, for male choir (TTBB), soprano (solo) and instruments (1956) – also available in a version for mixed choir, soprano and two piano's
- Klaagzangen van Jeremia (Lamentations of Jeremiah), for narrator, alto, mixed choir and piano (1956)
- Veni creator, for male choir, boys' choir (ad libitum) and organ, with two trumpets and two trombones ad libitum (1957)
- Veni, Sancte Spiritus, for male choir (TTBB) and organ (1958)
- Symbolum – a recitative cred', for mixed choir, organ and two trumpets and two trombones ad libitum (1961)
- Psalm 50 "Have mercy on me, O, God", for three equal voices with organ (1963)
- Via Sacra, for boys' choir, mixed choir (SAATBB), narrator, percussion and organ (1969)
- Trois psaumes (Psalms 25, 23 and 148) pour le temps present, for soprano, alto, tenor, bas, mixed choir and orchestra (1971)
- Christmas cycle, six Christmas carols for mixed choir and organ (1973)
- Alleluia!, for mixed choir and organ (1975)
- Elckerlyc, for male choir (TTBB), boys' choir and orchestra (or: mixed choir (SATB), boys' choir and orchestra) (1975) – words: Jan Engelman
- Heart-Rhythm, for male choir (TTBB), narrator (if possible two), 3 percussionists, organ and double-bass (1975) – composed for the European Congress of Cardiologists in 1976
- Gloria, for mixed choir, organ and orchestra (1976)
- Hymn for St. Chrystophore, for mixed choir and orchestra – words: Anton v. Duinkerken
- O, Roma, choir in unison and organ

=== Chamber music ===
- Sonate, for cello and piano (1925)
- Intrada and sortie – processional and recessional, for organ and 1 or 2 trumpets and 1 or 2 trombones (1959)
- Suite in C-major, for flute, oboe, clarinet, bassoon and harp (1960)
- Toccata-batalla, for 2 trumpets, 2 trombones, timpani and organ (or organ solo) (1972)

=== Works for organ ===
- Toccata (1936) – dedicated to Charles Tournemire
- Tema con variazione per la notte di natale (1951) – dedicated to Flor Peeters
- Choral (1951)
- Toccata (1957)
- 10 Inventiones (1959)
- Marcia funebre (1959)
- Rondeña, for organ pedal and timpani (1960)
- Sonata da chiesa (1961)
- Cortège (1963)
- Toccata II (1970) – dedicated to Flor Peeters
- Two themes with variations, variations on "Frère Jacques" and "Veni Creator Spiritus" (1971)
- Prelude "The bells" (1972)
- Fugue sur les petits et les grands jeux (1974)
- Postludium (super FeikE (A)Asma) (1974) – dedicated to Feike Asma
- Invocatio (1975)
- Voluntary (1975)
- Toccate concertante (1976)
- Toccate pentecosta – "Veni sancte spiritus, et emitte caelitus lucis tuae radium" (1977)
- 12 Inventions
- Choral

=== Works for piano ===
- Six inventions à deux voix (1928)
- Le carillon de cithère, from the movie: «Le mirioir parlant» (1938)
- Sonate biblique pour le fête de Noël, for piano four hands
- Sonatine (1968)

=== Works for carillon ===
- Theme with variations on the heart beat (1976)
- Fantasy on "O heer, die daer des Hemels tente spreyt – Valerius' gedenkclanck

== Publications ==
- César Franck, Amsterdam : Uitgeversmaatschappij Holland, 1949. 204 p.
- Vijftig meesterwerken der muziek vol. 1, Den Haag : Dieben, 1953. 157 p.
- Vijftig meesterwerken der muziek vol. 2, Den Haag : Dieben, 1960. 132 p.
- Vijftig meesterwerken der muziek vol. 3, Den Haag : Dieben, 196?. 120 p.
- Igor Strawinsky, biografie, Haarlem: J.H. Gottmer, 1966. 278 p.
- Nederlandse componisten van heden en verleden(Dutch composers in the past and today), Amsterdam: A.J.G. Strengholt, 1968, 280 p.

== Sources ==
- Paap, Wouter. (1976). p. 34-36. The Composer Marius Monnikendam. J.H.Gottmer. Haarlem. ISBN 90-257-0323-2
- Paap, Wouter., Zijlstra, Miep; Robijns, J., Zijlstra, Miep., eds. (1979). Algemene Muziek Encyclopedie, (deel 6). p. 363-364. Unieboek. Bussum. ISBN 90-228-4937-6
