= Grand Design =

Grand Design, or variants, may refer to:

== Television ==
- Grand Designs, a British TV show since 1999
- "The Grand Design" (Daredevil: Born Again), an episode of Daredevil: Born Again
- "The Grand Design" (Yes, Prime Minister), an episode of Yes, Prime Minister

== Literature ==
- The Grand Design (book), by Stephen Hawking and Leonard Mlodinow, 2010

== Music ==
- The Grand Design (album), by Edenbridge, 2006
- "Grand Designs", a song by Rush from the 1985 album Power Windows
- "Evolution (The Grand Design)", a song by Symphony X from the 2000 album V: The New Mythology Suite

== Other uses ==
- Grand design spiral galaxy, a type of spiral galaxy
- Program for Action, or Grand Design, a former New York City Subway expansion plan
- Grand Design, the project to integrate the Louvre Palace and Tuileries Palace in Paris, France
- Groot Desseyn, the Dutch West India Company's plan to seize the Iberian Union's possessions in Africa and the Americas

== See also ==
- Natural theology, that seeks to provide arguments for theological topics based on reason and the discoveries of science
