= Salomé (Mariotte) =

Opera by Antoine Mariotte

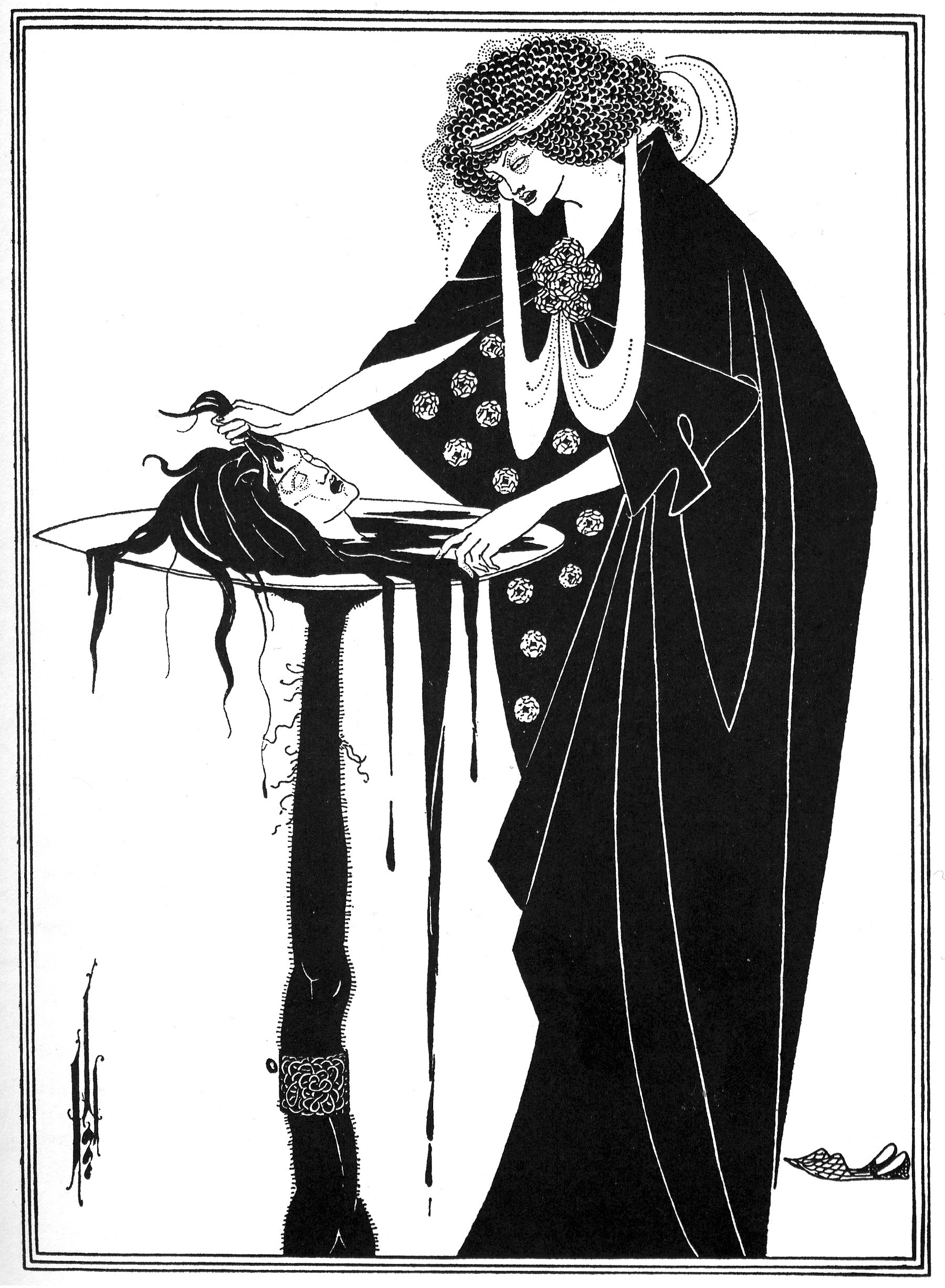
The Dancer's Reward, illustration to Wilde's play by Aubrey Beardsley

Salomé is a 1908 opera in one act by Antoine Mariotte to a libretto based on the 1891 French play Salome by Oscar Wilde. However, that work was itself inspired by Flaubert's Herodias. Mariotte began to compose his opera before the far more famous treatment of the same source by German composer Richard Strauss (Salome), but his premiered after the Strauss work.

== Composition history ==
While in the French navy in the Far East, Mariotte had read the Oscar Wilde play Salome, and decided to set it to music. During his return to Europe by sea, he had access to a piano to continue his work. While on leave, he took a course at the Conservatoire by Charles-Marie Widor, then resigned from the navy in 1897, choosing to enter into the Schola Cantorum where he was taught by Vincent d'Indy. After being appointed professor of piano at the Conservatoire in Lyon, he completed the score of his Salomé, believing himself to have permission from Wilde's estate and the publisher Methuen.

In fact, having obtained the agreement to use the play, Richard Strauss had in turn asked his publisher Fürstner to acquire the rights. Wilde's particularly complicated estate led to a court case that favoured the rights of Fürstner. Mariotte learnt that Fürstner would oppose the production of a "Salomé française" and after going to Berlin, he obtained permission to have his piece staged, on condition that 40% royalties went to Richard Strauss and 10% to Fürstner, with all scores to be sent after the run to Fürstner to be destroyed. Romain Rolland, having read an article by Mariotte in the Revue internationale de musique, helped him to obtain a more generous settlement from Strauss.

== Performance history ==
On 30 October 1908, Mariotte's opera was produced at the Grand-Théâtre de Lyon (three years after Strauss's in Dresden) with success, and with De Wailly singing the title role. On the initiative of the Isola brothers, the Paris premiere took place on 22 April 1910 (for 12 performances) at the Gaîté-Lyrique, featuring Lucienne Bréval as Salomé, Mathilde Comès as Hérodias, Jean Périer as Hérode, Georges Petit as Iokanaan and André Gilly as the captain of guards, and was conducted by Auguste Amalou. Strauss's Salomé was presented that season at the Opéra with Mary Garden in the title role. After having been performed at Nancy, Le Havre, Marseille, Geneva, and Prague, Mariotte's Salomé was seen at the Paris Opéra on 1 July 1919 again with Bréval in the titular role.

After many years of neglect, the Opéra National de Montpellier presented both the Strauss and Mariotte versions of the opera in November 2005.

In February/March 2014, the Münchner Rundfunkorchester and soloists from the Bayerische Theaterakademie August Everding presented three performances at Munich's Prinzregententheater. Bayerischer Rundfunk Klassik live streamed the performance of 6 March on its website, and recorded the final performance of 8 March for later radio broadcast, on 26 April 2014.

The opera was staged in October 2014 as part of the 2014 Wexford Festival Opera in Wexford, Ireland, conducted by David Angus.

== Musical style ==
Mariotte's selection from the Wilde text was different from that of Strauss, as was the musical style of the opera. In comparison with the more famous Salome opera, Mariotte's rich orchestral colours are sombre: the drama unfolds in a sequence of tableaux. The characters are less extravagant and certainly less sexually charged; the dense, often contrapuntal sound-world has its roots in 19th century academicism. Mariotte uses an off-stage orchestra for the banquet in the opening scene while the final scene uses a wordless chorus to add an enigmatic glow to Salomé's ode to Iokanaan's head.

A work rich in orchestral invention and emotional intensity, Mariotte's Salomé is in some respects rather more sympathetic to the original Symbolist mood. Wilde wrote the play in French, because he felt its poetic language belonged to fin de siècle sensibility. Mariotte's version owes much to the sound world of Debussy and to the disengaged emotional landscape of Maeterlinck, who had highly praised Wilde's play.

== Roles ==
Role	Voice type	Premiere cast, 30 October 1908 (Conductor: Mariotte)
Hérode, Tetrarch of Judaea	baritone	Édouard Cotreuil
Hérodias, his wife (and niece)	contralto	Soïni
Salomé, his stepdaughter (and great-niece)	soprano	De Wailly
Iokanaan (John the Baptist)	baritone	Jean Aubert
Narraboth, Young Syrian, Captain of the Guard	tenor	Henry Grillières
The page of Hérodias	contralto	Gerval
First soldier	tenor	Van Laer
Second soldier	baritone	Verheyden
Royal guests (Egyptians and Romans), and entourage, Nazarenes, Jews, servants, soldiers

== Recording ==
- The 2005 Montpellier production was issued by Accord in 2007, conducted by Friedemann Layer with Kate Aldrich in the title role.
- The Bayerische Rundfunk has made its 2014 video recording available via its BR Klassik website.
