= Shangri-La (Edenbridge album) =

Studio album by Edenbridge
- Released: 16 September 2022
- Genre: Symphonic metal
- Length: 57:53
- Label: AFM
- Producer: Arne "Lanvall" Stockhammer

Edenbridge chronology
| Dynamind (2019) | Shangri-La (2022) | Set the Dark on Fire (2026) |

Shangri-La is the eleventh studio album by the Austrian symphonic metal band Edenbridge, released in 2022 through their new label, AFM Records. The band released a lyric video for one of their songs from the album, Somewhere Else But Here.

== Track listing ==
All tracks are written by Edenbridge.

| No. | Title | Length |
|---|---|---|
| 1. | "At First Light" | 8:03 |
| 2. | "The Call of Eden" | 3:49 |
| 3. | "Hall of Shame" | 5:00 |
| 4. | "Savage Land" | 4:33 |
| 5. | "Somewhere Else But Here" | 4:27 |
| 6. | "Freedom Is a Roof Made of Stars" | 5:51 |
| 7. | "Arcadia (The Great Escape)" | 5:11 |
| 8. | "The Road to Shangri-La" | 4:56 |
| 9. | "The Bonding (Part 2)": "I. Overture" (1:46); "II. Alpha and Omega" (4:10); "III. The Eleventh Hour" (3:06); "IV. Round and Round" (4:27); "V. The Timeless Now (2:41)" | 16:10 |
| Total length: | | 57:53 |

== Personnel ==
=== Edenbridge ===
- Sabine Edelsbacher – vocals
- Arne "Lanvall" Stockhammer – lead and rhythm guitars, keyboards, piano, acoustic guitars, mandolin
- Dominik Sebastian – lead and rhythm guitars
- Johannes Jungreithmeier – drums
- Stefan Gimpl – bass

=== Production ===
- Arne "Lanvall" Stockhammer – producer, music, vocal melodies, orchestral arrangement, orchestral score, recording, drum recording, mixing, orchestra recording
- Karl Groom – mastering
- Muhammad K. Nazia – cover
