= Sunrise in Eden =

Studio album by Edenbridge
- Released: September 25, 2000
- Studio: Seagull Music Studio, Austria
- Genre: Symphonic metal
- Length: 52:11
- Label: Massacre
- Producer: Lanvall

Edenbridge chronology
Sunrise in Eden (2000)	Arcana (2001)

Sunrise in Eden is the debut studio album of Austrian symphonic metal band Edenbridge. It was engineered by Dennis Ward of Pink Cream 69 and released in 2000 on the Massacre Records record label.

== Critical reception ==
Professional ratings
Review scores
Source	Rating
Metal Hammer Germany	5/7
Rock Hard	8.5/10
Metal.de	4/10
Powermetal.de	
Vampster	

Awarding five out of seven points, a review in the German edition of Metal Hammer marked the "fine melodies" and the band's musical abilities.

== Track listing ==
All tracks are written by Arne "Lanvall" Stockhammer.

No.	Title	Length
1.	"Cheyenne Spirit"	5:35
2.	"Sunrise in Eden"	8:31
3.	"Forever Shine On"	5:03
4.	"Holy Fire"	4:48
5.	"Wings of the Wind"	5:05
6.	"In the Rain"	4:29
7.	"Midnight at Noon"	4:11
8.	"Take Me Back"	4:15
9.	"My Last Step Beyond"	10:44
Total length:		52:11

== Personnel ==
=== Band members ===
- Sabine Edelsbacher – vocals
- Arne "Lanvall" Stockhammer – guitar, keyboards, producer
- Kurt Bednarsky – bass
- Roland Navratil – drums
- Georg Edelmann – guitar

=== Guest musicians ===
- Gandalf – sitar on "My Last Step Beyond", engineer
- Astrid Stockhammer – backing vocals

=== Production ===
- Dennis Ward – mixing
- Jochen Sachse – mastering
