= Marjo Tal =

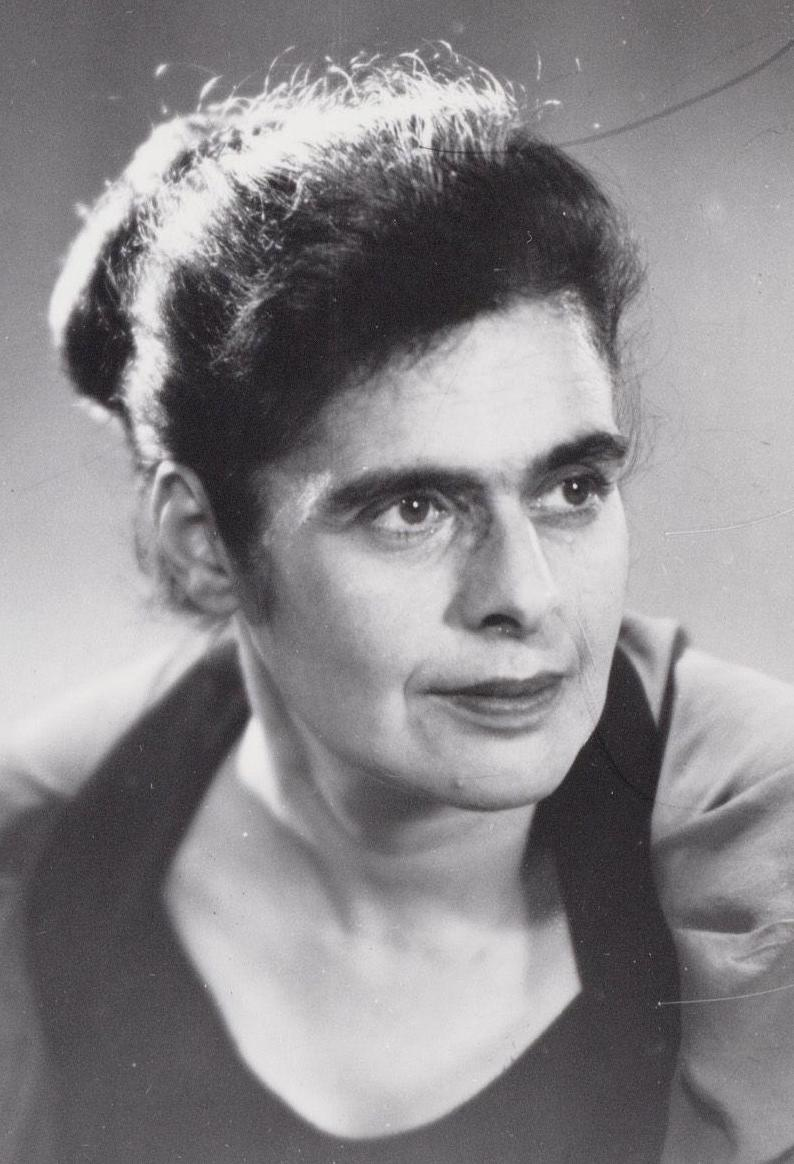

Marjo Tal (15 January 1915 - 27 August 2006) was a Dutch composer and pianist who wrote the music for over 150 songs and often performed them while accompanying herself on the piano.

== Life and career ==
=== Early life ===
Tal was born in The Hague, the oldest of three daughters in a Jewish family. She studied with Sem Dresden and Nelly Wagenaar at the Amsterdam Conservatory. In 1936, she won a 3-year government scholarship to study in London with pianist Franz Osborn, where she also accompanied the students of violinist Carl Flesch.

Tal returned to the Netherlands, where she made her debut at the Diligentia Theatre (in The Hague) on 7 March 1940. During WWII, she moved from hiding place to hiding place, and was not able to practice or perform in public. While moving around, she lost several early compositions: two string trios, a quartet, a violin sonata and a cello sonata.

Tal's two sisters moved to Israel after WWII. Marjo Tal remained in the Netherlands with her mother, who had survived the Bergen-Belsen concentration camp. She taught and worked as an accompanist at dance studios and fashion shows. Tal toured throughout Europe as a piano soloist. By the mid-1960s changed her focus from performance to composition.

=== Later life ===
Tal set poems by the following poets to music: Anna Akhmatova, Guillaume Apollinaire, Louis Aragon, Charles Baudelaire, Esther Blom, Rupert Brooke, Robert Desnos, Paul Eluard, Jan Engelman, Elizabeth Eybers, Maurice Fombeure, Paul Fort, Paul Geraldy, Jan Hendrix Leopoldo, Federico Garcia Lorca, Osip Mandelstam, Jacques Prevert, and Raymond Queneau. She made several recordings for BV Haast Records.

In 1988, Tal emigrated to Israel to live near her sisters. Her music was published by Donemus and Ray Ventura.

== Works ==
=== Chamber ===
- Miniaturen (various instruments)
- Old Irish Country Songs (recorder, harp and viola da gamba or flute, piano and cello)
- Seven Pieces for a Gentleman and His Recorder
- String Quartet
- Three Encores (recorder and piano)

=== Piano ===
- Drei in Een (piano 4 hands)
- Miniaturen (piano 4 hands)

=== Vocal ===
- “12 Chansons de Queneau”
- “20 Chansons de Prevert”
- “Acht Engelman Liederen”
- “After: Six Songs of Poems by Rupert Brooke”
- “Canciones Espanolas”
- “Canzonen: Five Songs”
- “Cent et Cinquant Chansons Litteraires”
- “Deux Rondeaux”
- “Dix Chansons de Jacques Prevert”
- En Sourdine (voice and instruments)
- “Four Settings of Irish Country Songs”
- Mass (choir and organ)
- “Sept Poemes d’Amour en Guerre”
- Siete Canciones Espanola (voice, piano and other instruments)
- “Six Songs”
- “Tender et Dangereux: Six Songs”
