= Arcana (album) =

Studio album by Edenbridge
- Released: 29 November 2001
- Studio: House of Audio Studios, Germany
- Genre: Symphonic metal
- Length: 50:44
- Label: Massacre Records
- Producer: Lanvall

Edenbridge chronology
Sunrise in Eden (2000)	Arcana (2001)	Aphelion (2003)

Professional ratings
Review scores
Source	Rating
Rock Hard	9/10
Metal Express Radio	
Powermetal.de	
Vampster	

Arcana is the second album by the Austrian symphonic metal band Edenbridge. The track "Velvet Eyes of Dawn" is present only in the digipak edition.

== Track listing ==
All music and lyrics written by Arne "Lanvall" Stockhammer

1. "Ascending" - 1:07
2. "Starlight Reverie" - 4:13
3. "The Palace" - 6:56
4. "A Moment of Time" - 4:08
5. "Fly on a Rainbow Dream" - 4:41
6. "Color My Sky" - 4:34
7. "Velvet Eyes of Dawn" - 6:16 (digipack bonus track)
8. "Into the Light" - 5:22
9. "Suspiria" - 5:12
10. "Winter Winds" - 4:43
11. "Arcana" - 9:48
12. "The Whisper of the Ages" - 6:07 (Japanese edition bonus track)

== Personnel ==
=== Band members ===
- Sabine Edelsbacher - lead and backing vocals
- Arne "Lanvall" Stockhammer - lead, rhythm and acoustic guitars, keyboards, producer
- Kurt Bednarsky - bass
- Roland Navratil - drums
- Andreas Eibler - rhythm and lead guitars

=== Production ===
- Jochen Weyer - engineer
- Dennis Ward - mixing
- Jochen Sachse - mastering
