= Jan Mul =

Dutch composer (1911–1971)

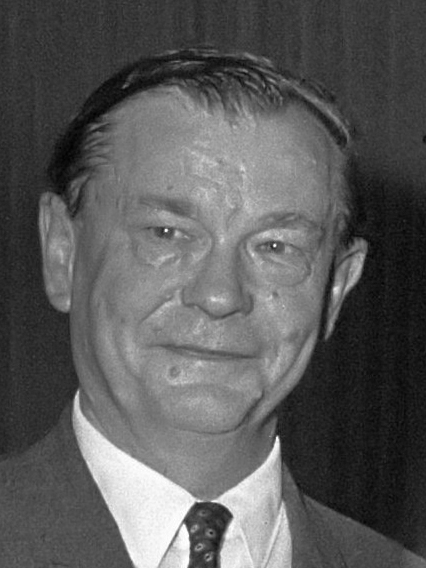
Jan Mul (1968)

Jan Mul (20 September 1911 – 30 December 1971) was a Dutch composer, mainly of church music. He was born in Haarlem and studied with Sem Dresden at the Amsterdam Conservatory; Mul orchestrated Dresden's opera Francois Villon after the composer's death.

Mul died at Overveen, aged 60.
