= The Great Momentum =

Studio album by Edenbridge
- Released: 17 February 2017
- Recorded: 2016
- Genre: Symphonic metal, power metal
- Length: 54:40
- Label: SPV
- Producer: Arne "Lanvall" Stockhammer

Edenbridge chronology
The Bonding (2013)	The Great Momentum (2017)	Dynamind (2019)

The Great Momentum is the ninth studio album by the Austrian symphonic metal band Edenbridge. It was released on 17 February 2017 on the SPV label. Bassist Wolfgang Rothbauer left Edenbridge in 2016, so Lanvall performed the bass in the recording of this album. Drummer Max Pointner had also quit in 2016, being replaced by new drummer Johannes Jungreithmeier.

== Reception ==
Professional ratings
Review scores
Source	Rating
Metal Hammer Italy	64/100
Soundscape	5/10

The Great Momentum received mixed professional reviews. While the Sonic Seducer was very positive about the production of the album, the musical diversity and drummer Jungreithmeier's debut, the Italian edition of Metal Hammer called the album "almost disappointing". The reviewer wrote that it was far away from the class of previous releases like The Bonding. According to the Soundscape magazine, there was "not a lot of variety within the songs" and the album did not contain any new ideas.

The Great Momentum reached position 82 of the German album charts being the band's second album to chart in Germany.

== Track listing ==
All tracks are written by Lanvall. Tracks 2, 4, 6, 7, and 8 also written by Sabine Edelsbacher

No.	Title	Length
1.	"Shiantara"	5:51
2.	"The Die Is Not Cast"	5:14
3.	"The Moment Is Now"	4:23
4.	"Until the End of Time"	4:35
5.	"The Visitor"	5:53
6.	"Return to Grace"	5:13
7.	"Only a Whiff of Life"	3:45
8.	"A Turnaround in Art"	7:30
9.	"The Greatest Gift of All"	12:16
Total length:		54:40

The album also contains a bonus disc featuring the instrumental versions of all tracks.

== Personnel ==
Credits adapted from Edenbridge's official website.

=== Edenbridge ===
- Sabine Edelsbacher – vocals
- Lanvall – lead and rhythm guitars, bass guitar, keyboards, piano, acoustic guitars, hammered dulcimer, bouzouki
- Dominik Sebastian – lead and rhythm guitars
- Johannes Jungreithmeier – drums

=== Guest musicians ===
- Erik Martensson – lead vocals on "Until the End of Time"
- Thomas Strübler – backing vocals and choirs
- Alexander "LX" Koller – backing vocals on "The Die Is Not Cast" and "The Greatest Gift Of All"
- Junge Philharmonie Freistadt – orchestra

=== Production ===
- Lanvall – producer, music, vocal melodies, orchestral arrangement, orchestral score, recording, drum recording, mixing, orchestra recording
- Drums recorded by Frank Pitters and Lanvall
- Drum recordings assisted by Anton Konrath
- Orchestra recorded by Matthias Kronsteiner and Lanvall
- Mixed by Karl Groom
- Mastered by Mika Jussila at Finnvox Studios
- Cover design by Anthony Clarkson
- Cover and layout design by Johannes Jungreithmeier

== Charts ==
Chart (2017)	Peak position
German Albums (Offizielle Top 100)	82
Swiss Albums (Schweizer Hitparade)	80
