= Maria Elizabeth van Ebbenhorst Tengbergen =

Maria Elizabeth van Ebbenhorst Tengbergen (July 11, 1885 – July 16, 1980) was a Dutch composer, lyricist, organist, and teacher.

Tengbergen was born in Hoorn to Susanna Maria Gerlings and Hendrik Johan van Ebbenhorst Tengbergen, a government official. Her first music teacher was her aunt, Maria Elizabeth Gerlings, who was an organist. She studied music at schools in Leiden and Amsterdam with teachers Jean Baptiste de Paux, Sem Dresden, Steven van Groningen, and Wilhelmina ter Huppen.

Tengbergen worked as a music teacher and organist. She wrote the lyrics as well as the music for many of her songs. Her students included the British musicologist Macario Santiago Kastner. Dutch artist Engelien Reitsma-Valença engraved a print of Tengbergen at the piano in 1921, which is in the Rijksmuseum today . Tengbergen corresponded with author and drama critic Jeanne Gabriëlle van Schaik-Willing. Tengbergen's papers are archived in the Netherlands Music Institute.

Tengbergen's works were published by Alsbach, Broekmans & van Poppel, Heuwekemeijer, Ploegsma, and Seyffardt. Her publications included:

== Books ==
- Baron van Hippelepip: een verhaaltje voor kinderen met plaatjes en muziek (Baron van Hippelepip: a story for children with pictures and music; with Leo Visser)
- Solfeges

== Chamber ==
- 8 Trios for Three Recorders
- Als Duizend Sterren Schijnen (When 1,000 Stars Shine; violin and piano)
- Suite for Violin and Piano

== Operetta ==
- Sneeuwit en Rozerood (Snow White and Rose Red)

== Piano ==
- 4 Sonatines: voor Piano (4 Sonatinas for Piano)
- 50 Polyphonic Pieces
- Bedenkseltjes Aan De Piano (Ideas at the Piano)
- Bekende Liedjes (Well-Known Songs; 4 hand piano)
- De Ontwikkeling aan de Piano (Musical Development at the Piano)
- Klimmen & Dalen (Climbing and Descending)
- Muzikale Bouwstenen (Musical Building Blocks)
- Oude Wijsjes Voor Jonge Handen (Old Tunes for Young Hands)
- Studies in Wit en Zwart: 30 Piano-etudes voor de Jeugd (Studies in White and Black: 30 Piano Etudes for Youth)

== Vocal ==
- 7 Kinderliedjes (7 Nursery Rhymes; voice and piano)
- Als Engelen Zingen: een Verzameling Kerstliederen voor de Jeugd (When Angels Sing: A Collection of Christmas Carols for Youth)
- "Am Himmelstor" (At the Gate of Heaven; baritone and piano; text by Conrad Ferdinand Meyer)
- "Benedizione" (Blessing; voice and piano)
- Bij de schoorsteen: een bundel St. Nicolaasliedjes (At the Chimney: A Bundle of St. Nicholas Songs)
- "Bomen in Nevel" (Trees in Mist; voice and piano)
- "Maria, die Zoude naar Bethlehem" (Mary, Who Would Go to Bethlehem; voice and piano)
- Sint Nicolaas en Kerstliederen (Saint Nicholas and Christmas Carols)
- "Stil nu Tekst" (Quiet Now)
- Trekvogels: 14 Canons met Tekst (Migratory Birds: 14 Canons with Text)
- Twee Liederen (2 Songs; voice and piano)
