= Solitaire (Edenbridge album) =

Studio album by Edenbridge
- Released: 30 June 2010
- Genres: Symphonic metal, power metal
- Length: 52:57
- Label: Napalm Records
- Producer: Lanvall

Edenbridge chronology
MyEarthDream (2008)	Solitaire (2010)	The Bonding (2013)

Solitaire is the seventh studio album by the Austrian symphonic metal band Edenbridge. Like its predecessor MyEarthDream, Solitaire also enlists the Czech Film Orchestra. Although the album features mainly symphonic metal, influences of power metal have also been observed.

== Reception ==
Professional ratings
Review scores
Source	Rating
About.com	3.5/5 stars
Metal Hammer Germany	5/7
Sonic Seducer	(very favourable)

The album received positive reviews from the critics. The complex sound, a flawless production and the vocal abilities of singer Sabine Edelsbacher have been noted by both About.com and the German Sonic Seducer magazine. The latter also mentioned a few hints at power metal in the album and considered the overall material an aspirant for Symphonic metal song classics. The German edition of Metal Hammer praised the orchestral arrangements by Arne "Lanvall" Stockhammer and the overall musical mix of classic elements and metal.

Solitaire did not enter the Austrian charts but peaked at position 95 in Germany.

== Track listing ==
No.	Title	Length
1.	"Entree Unique"	1:13
2.	"Solitaire"	6:15
3.	"Higher"	3:50
4.	"Skyline's End"	5:32
5.	"Bon Voyage Vagabond"	5:52
6.	"Inward Passage" (Special Edition bonus track)	1:20
7.	"Come Undone"	4:11
8.	"Out of This World"	5:10
9.	"Further Afield"	5:54
10.	"Eternity" (Special Edition bonus track)	3:04
11.	"A Virtual Dream?"	5:08
12.	"Brothers on Diamir"	6:52
13.	"Exit Unique"	2:49
Total length:		57:10

== Personnel ==
- Sabine Edelsbacher – vocals
- Lanvall – lead and rhythm guitar, keyboards, piano, bass guitar, acoustic guitar, bouzouki
- Max Pointer – drums, percussion
- Dominik Sebastian – guitar, classic guitar
