= Camille Mauclair =

French writer

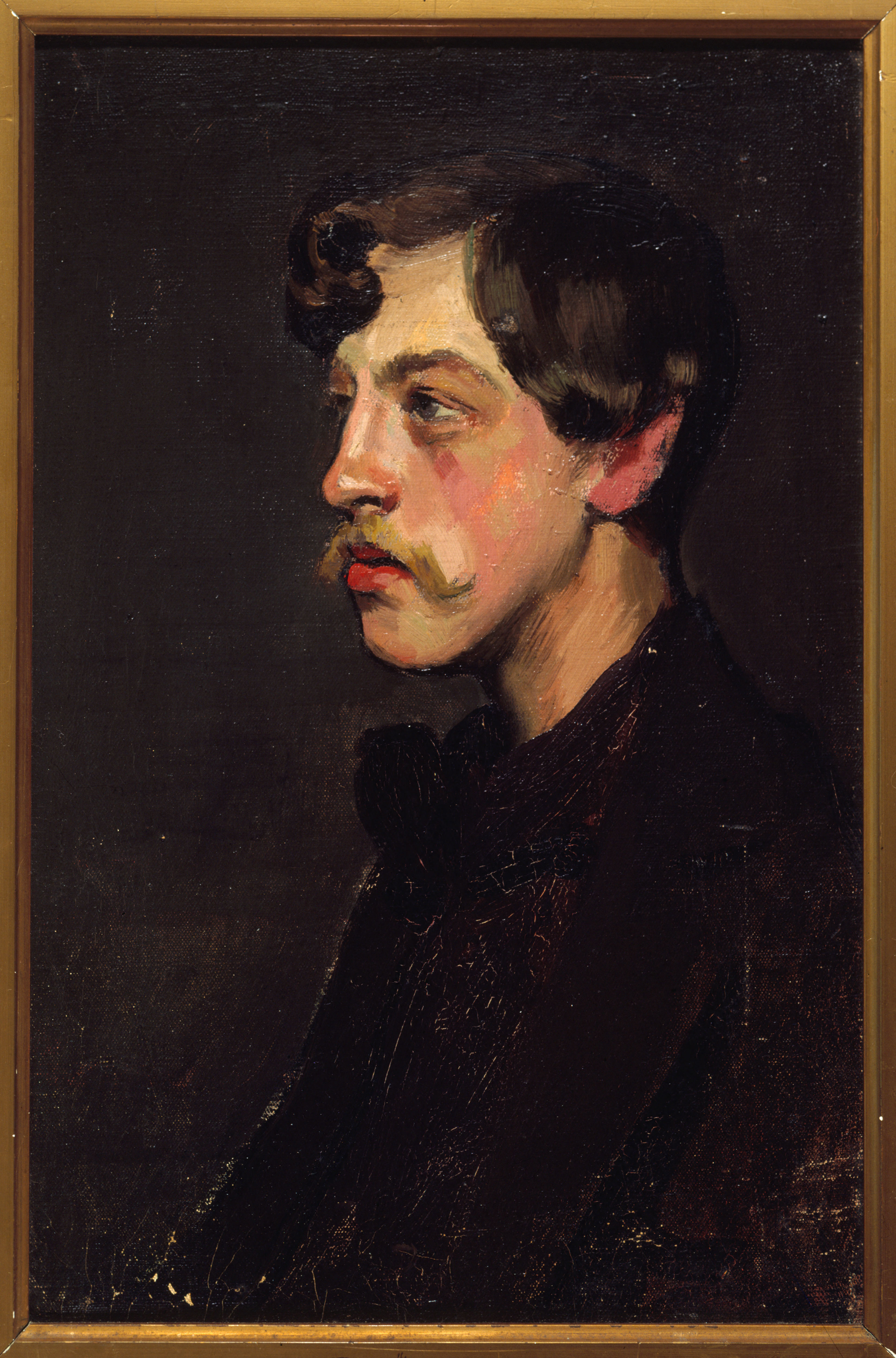
Camille Mauclair by Henry Bataille, c. 1895

Séverin Faust (December 29, 1872, Paris – April 23, 1945), better known by his pseudonym Camille Mauclair (French pronunciation: [kamij moklɛʁ]), was a French poet, novelist, biographer, travel writer, and art critic.

== Background ==
Mauclair was a great admirer of Stéphane Mallarmé, to whom he dedicated several works, and of Maurice Maeterlinck. He was initially a poet and novelist. His poetry attracted some attention and was set to music by Ernest Bloch, Gustave Charpentier, and Ernest Chausson and Nadia Boulanger. His best-known novel is Le Soleil des morts (1898), a roman à clef containing fictionalized portraits of leading avant-garde writers, artists, and musicians of the 1890s, which has been recognized as an important historical document of the fin de siècle. He also wrote several non-fiction books about music including Schumann (1906), The Religion of Music (1909), The History of European Music from 1850–1914 (1914) and The Heroes of the Orchestra (1921) which contributed greatly to French awareness of musical trends in turn-of-the-century Paris.

As art critic at the Mercure de France, he attacked artists such as Paul Gauguin and Henri de Toulouse-Lautrec, though he expressed his admiration when their work became accepted.

Later in life he wrote mainly nonfiction, including travel writing such as Normandy (1939), biographies of writers, artists, and musicians, and art criticism. In his art criticism, he supported impressionism and symbolism, but disdained Fauvism, writing of the style that "a pot of paint has been flung in the face of the public". He also provided the libretto for Antoine Mariotte's 3-act 'conte lyrique' Nele Dooryn, premiered at the Opéra-Comique in 1940.

At the end of his life, he collaborated with the Vichy France-regime, and worked for the Grand Magazine illustré de la Race : Revivre.

He was also a cofounder of the Théâtre de l'Œuvre with Lugné-Poe.
