= Dynamind =

Studio album by Edenbridge
- Released: October 25, 2019
- Genre: Symphonic metal
- Length: 55:06
- Label: Steamhammer/SPV
- Producer: Arne "Lanvall" Stockhammer

Edenbridge chronology
The Great Momentum (2017)	Dynamind (2019)	Shangri-La (2022)

Dynamind is the tenth studio album by the Austrian symphonic metal band Edenbridge. The band released a music video for one of their singles, On The Other Side. The album was released on October 25, 2019.

== Track listing ==
All tracks are written by Edenbridge.

No.	Title	Length
1.	"The Memory Hunter"	5:02
2.	"Live and Let Go"	4:28
3.	"Where Oceans Collide"	4:07
4.	"On the Other Side"	4:48
5.	"All Our Yesterdays"	4:56
6.	"The Edge of Your World"	5:52
7.	"Tauerngold"	5:36
8.	"What Dreams May Come"	5:58
9.	"The Last of His Kind"	12:15
10.	"Dynamind"	2:12
Total length:		55:06

== Personnel ==
=== Edenbridge ===
- Sabine Edelsbacher – vocals
- Arne "Lanvall" Stockhammer – lead and rhythm guitars, keyboards, piano, acoustic guitars, mandolin
- Dominik Sebastian – lead and rhythm guitars
- Johannes Jungreithmeier – drums
- Stefan Gimpl – bass

=== Production ===
- Arne "Lanvall" Stockhammer – production, music, vocal melodies, orchestral arrangement, orchestral score, engineering, drum recording, mixing, orchestra recording
- Johannes Jungreithmeier – engineering (drums), cover, layout
- Karl Groom – mixing
- Mika Jussila – mastering
