= Aphelion (Edenbridge album) =

Studio album by Edenbridge
- Released: January 27, 2003
- Recorded: November 2002
- Studio: House of Audio Studios, Germany
- Genre: Symphonic metal
- Length: 57:49
- Label: Massacre Records
- Producer: Lanvall

Edenbridge chronology
Arcana (2001)	Aphelion (2003)	Shine (2004)

Professional ratings
Review scores
Source	Rating
Rock Hard	7/10
Heavymetal.dk	5/10
Powermetal.de	
Vampster	

Aphelion is the third studio album by the Austrian symphonic metal band Edenbridge. It was released in 2003.

== Track listing ==
All music and lyrics written by Arne "Lanvall" Stockhammer

1. "The Undiscovered Land" — 6:08
2. "Skyward" — 4:39
3. "The Final Curtain" — 4:44
4. "Perennial Dreams" — 4:57
5. "Fly at Higher Game" — 4:48
6. "As Far as Eyes Can See" — 4:35
7. "The Whispering Gallery" (Bonus Track: Europe) — 5:17
8. "Deadend Fire" — 4:25
9. "Farpoint Anywhere" — 4:13
10. "Where Silence Has Lease" — 4:43
11. "Red Ball in Blue Sky" — 9:11
12. "On the Verge of Infinity" (Bonus Track: Japan) — 4:52

== Personnel ==
=== Band members ===
- Sabine Edelsbacher - lead and backing vocals
- Arne "Lanvall" Stockhammer - rhythm and acoustic Guitars, piano and keyboards, bouzouki, producer
- Roland Navratil - drums
- Andreas Eibler - rhythm and lead guitars

=== Guest musicians ===
- Stefan Model - bass
- D. C. Cooper - lead and backing vocals on "Red Ball in Blue Sky"

=== Production ===
- Dennis Ward - engineer, mixing
- Jürgen Lusky - mastering
