= Leo Smit (Dutch composer) =

Dutch composer

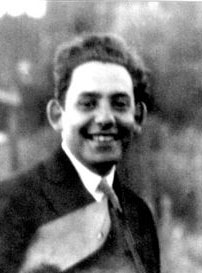
- Leo Smit in c. 1918
- Born: Leopold Smit; 14 May 1900; Amsterdam, Netherlands
- Died: 30 April 1943 (aged 42); Sobibór extermination camp
- Occupation: Composer
- Era: 20th century

Leopold "Leo" Smit (14 May 1900 – 30 April 1943) was a Dutch composer, murdered during The Holocaust at the Sobibor extermination camp.

== Life ==
He came from a mixed Ashkenazi and Portuguese-Sephardi Jewish family. He was born at Plantage Kerklaan 17, Amsterdam, and studied piano at the Conservatorium van Amsterdam with Sem Dresden and Ulfert Schults and then composition with Bernard Zweers and Sem Dresden.

In 1927 he moved to Paris, where the music of Maurice Ravel and Igor Stravinsky made a deep impression on him. Here he was in close contact with the group of composers known as Les Six, which included Darius Milhaud, Arthur Honegger, and Francis Poulenc. He married Lien de Vries in Amsterdam in January 1933. At the end of 1936, Smit moved to Brussels, where he stayed for a year. In late 1937, he returned to Amsterdam, where he completed his last work, the sonata for flute and piano, on February 12, 1943. On April 27, 1943 he was deported to Sobibor, where he was killed three days later.

After his death there was for a time little interest in his music, but since the late 1980s, his work has been performed regularly. A 4-CD box set containing his complete works, Kamermuziek en Orkestwerken (NM 93003) has been issued.

== Compositions ==
- Sonata for Flute and Piano (1943); orchestrated in 1989 by Willem Strietman
- String Quartet (1939–1943)
- Divertimento for Piano 4-Hands (1940); orchestrated in 2008 by Andries van Rossem and in 2022/2025 by Peter Bouma
- Concerto for Viola and String Orchestra (1940)
- De bruid (The Fiancée) for Female Chorus (1939); words by Jan Prins
- Suite for Oboe and Cello (1938)
- Trio for Clarinet, Viola and Piano (1938)
- Kleine Prelude van Ravel for Alto and Piano (1938); poem by Martinus Nijhoff
- La Mort (Death) for Soprano, Alto and Piano (1938); words by Charles Baudelaire
- Concerto for Piano and Wind Orchestra (1937)
- Concertino for Cello and Orchestra (1937)
- Symphonie in C (1936)
- Sextet for Flute, Oboe, Clarinet, Bassoon, Horn and Piano (1933)
- Concertino for Harp and Orchestra (1933)
- Deux hommages for Piano (1928–1930)
- Schemselnihar, Ballet for orchestra (1929)
- Quintet for Flute, Violin, Viola, Cello and Harp (1928)
- Trio for Flute, Viola and Harp (1926)
- Suite for Piano (1926); Forlane et Rondeau, movements freely orchestrated in 1958 by Godfried Devreese
- Silhouetten for Orchestra (1925)
- Voorspel tot Teirlincks "De vertraagde film" (Overture to Teirlinck's "De Vertraagde Film") for Orchestra (1923)
- Twintig eenvoudige oefeningen (20 Simple Exercises) for Piano
- Twaalf stukken voor 4 handen (12 Pieces) for Piano 4-Hands
