= Sem Dresden =

Dutch composer (1881–1957)

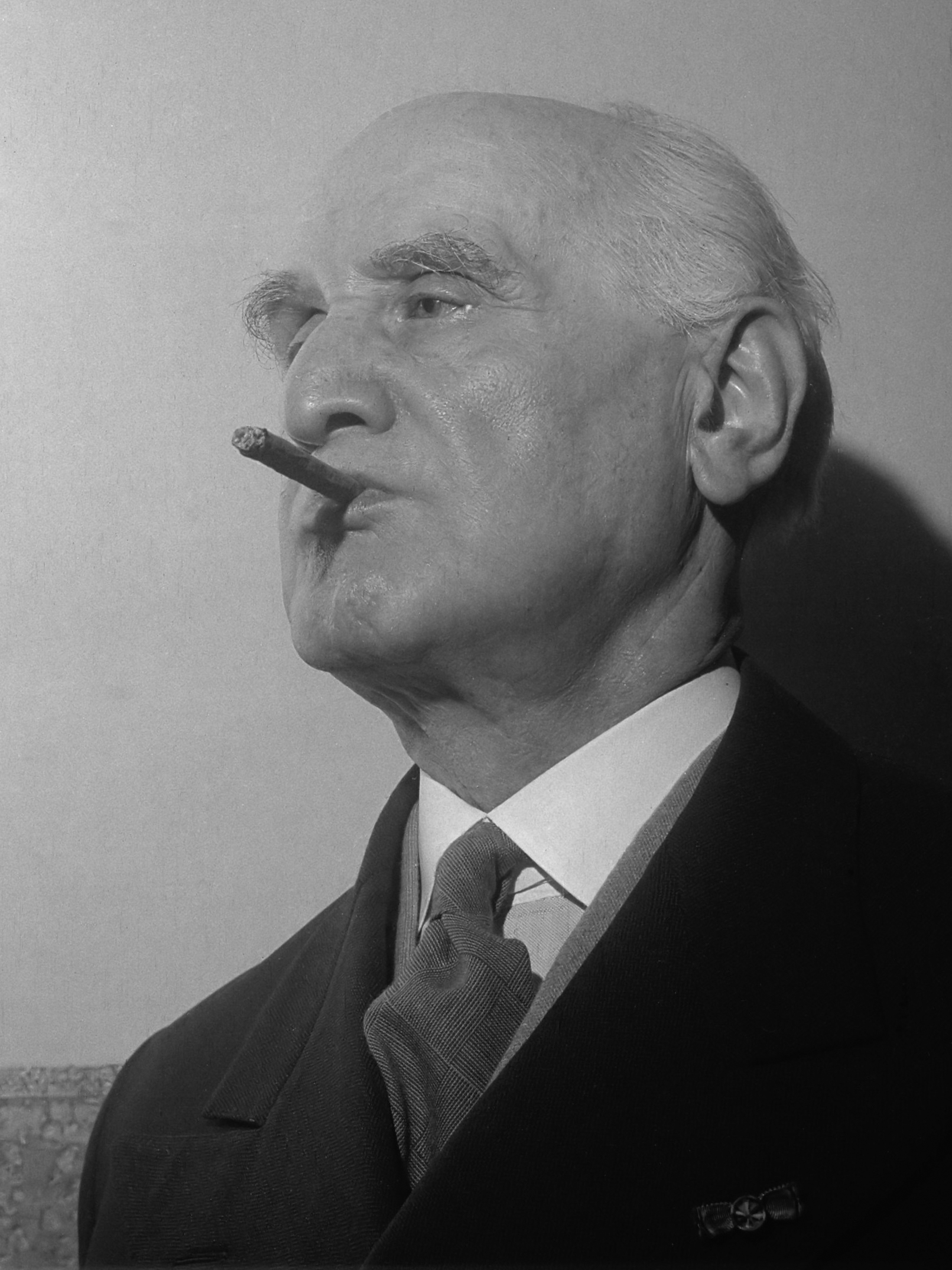
Sem Dresden (1956)

Samuel "Sem" Dresden (April 20, 1881 in Amsterdam – July 30, 1957 at The Hague) was a Dutch conductor, composer, and teacher.

== Life ==
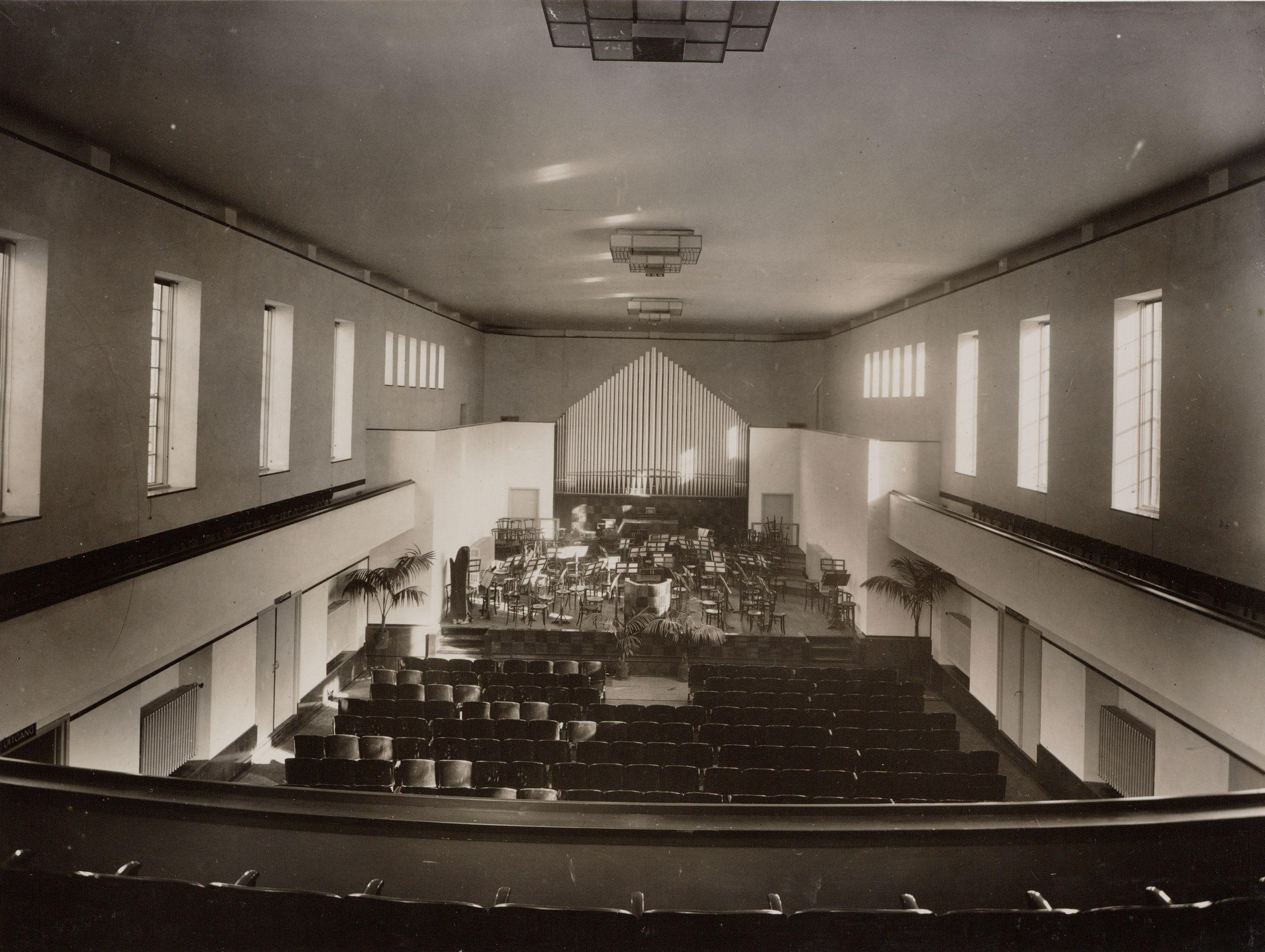
The old Amsterdam Conservatory concert hall in 1931 at the Bachstraat

Dresden was born into a Jewish diamond-broking family and initially studied musical theory with Fred Roeske and composition with Bernard Zweers. He studied violin with Johannes Cornelis Dudok and Felice Togni. On the strength of a promising piano piece, he was sent to study composition and conducting under Hans Pfitzner at the Stern Conservatory in Berlin between 1903–5 and was there encouraged to take an interest in Impressionist music. After returning to the Netherlands, he was until 1914 a choral conductor, as choirmaster at Laren, Amsterdam and Tiel. It was during this period that he married the noted alto Jacoba Dhont, by whom he was to have two sons. Then until 1926 he directed the nine-member Madrigal Society, which earned an international reputation for its painstaking performances of Renaissance, Baroque and contemporary choral music, and afterwards, from 1928 to 1940, a larger chamber choir in Haarlem. To the repertoire of all of these he contributed compositions and arrangements of his own.

From 1915 he lectured on musical subjects, both in the Netherlands and in Belgium. In 1918, with Daniel Ruyneman and Henri Zagwijn, he founded the Society of Modern Dutch Composers (which, however, had ceased to exist by 1924). He began teaching composition at the Amsterdam Conservatory in 1919, achieving the post of director in 1924. From 1937–41 he served as director of the Royal Conservatory in The Hague, a post he was forced to leave after the Nazi take-over, and then again from 1945–49. Among his pupils were the composers Leo Smit, Willem van Otterloo, Marjo Tal, Maria Elizabeth van Ebbenhorst Tengbergen, Jan Mul and Cor de Groot and the conductor Eduard van Beinum. After retiring from teaching in 1949, he devoted himself fully to composition and many of his better-known works were composed very late in his life. Dresden also wrote criticism for the newspaper De Telegraaf (1918–27) and wrote two books on modern music. Shortly before his death he converted to Roman Catholicism.

== Music ==
The compositions written after Dresden returned from Berlin show largely French influences, as in the four suites for wind and piano composed for the Amsterdam Concertgebouw Sextet (1912–14) and the Sonata for Flute and Harp (1918). His later music is essentially tonal, but with variations of his own; it also shows the influence of his long involvement with Renaissance polyphony. Through his choral experience he became fascinated with traditional Dutch songs, of which he made many popular arrangements. In addition, he used these tunes to generate themes in original compositions. In the Chorus tragicus (1927), to a text by Vondel concerning the fall of Jerusalem, the Chorus symphonicus (based on Biblical psalms, 1943–56), the oratorio based on Gustave Flaubert's St Antoine (written for the 1953 international congress of church music in Augsburg), Psalm 84 (1954) and St Joris (1955), Dresden emerged as his country’s leading twentieth-century composer of oratorios and festive choral music. The Chorus symphonicus, his most monumental composition, was largely written during his internment in World War II. It contrasts with the operetta Toto (1945), written after his liberation, which is about a little dog concealed from the licensing authorities and a humorous representation of his own existence during the Occupation.

Dresden’s last composition was the one-act opera François Villon, that his pupil Jan Mul orchestrated after his death, and the work was first performed during the 1958 Holland Festival.

== Works ==
- Sonata for violin and piano, 1905 (Amsterdam with Carl Flesch)
- Sextet for strings and pianoforte (June 1911, Amsterdam)
- Three Sextets for wind instruments and pianoforte (1912, 1914, Amsterdam)
- Trio for two oboes and cor anglais (1912, Amsterdam)
- Duo for two pianofortes (31 January 1914, Amsterdam, Sisters Roll)
- Suites for Piano and Violin, No. 1-3, 1911–20
- Theme and Variations, orchestral, 1913
- Sonata for cello and piano, (January 14, 1918, Arnhem, Thomas Canivez and composer)
- Sonata for flute and harp (6 November 1918, The Hague, Rosa Spier and Klasen)
- Wachterlied, unaccompanied chorus (27 August 1919, Amsterdam, Madrigaalvereenigung)
- Chorus Tragicus, 1927
- Violin Concerto No. 1 (1936)
- Symphonietta, clarinet and orchestra, 1938
- O Kerstnacht, 1939
- Oboe Concerto, 1939
- Violin Concerto No. 2 (1942)
- Piano Concerto (1942)
- Assumpta est Maria, 1943
- Sonata for Solo Violin, 1943
- Suite for Solo Cello, 1943–47
- Chorus symphonicus 1943–56
- Toto, operetta, 1945
- Gelukkig is het land (Happy is the Land by Bertus Aafjes), 1948;
- Flute Concerto, 1949
- Hor ai dolor, piano, 1950
- Psalm 94, 1950;
- Beatus vir, male chorus, 1951;
- Dansflitsen, orchestral suite, 1951
- Organ Concerto, 1952-3
- Den aap en de katte (The Monkey and the Cat by Joost van den Vondel), a capella male chorus, 1953;
- Saint Antoine, oratorio, 1953
- 3 Vocalises, 1954;
- Psalm 84, 1954;
- Carnavals Cantate, for male choir and orchestra, 1954–5;
- Symfonie concertante, 1956
- Rembrandt's Saul and David, for soprano and orchestra, 1956
- Francois Villon, opera, 1956–57; orch. Jan Mul

== Note ==
The biographical material is largely gathered from the articles in the Dutch Wikipedia, the Biografisch Woordenboek van Nederland (Den Haag 1979) and at the Netherlands Music Institute.
