= Jan Engelman =

Dutch writer

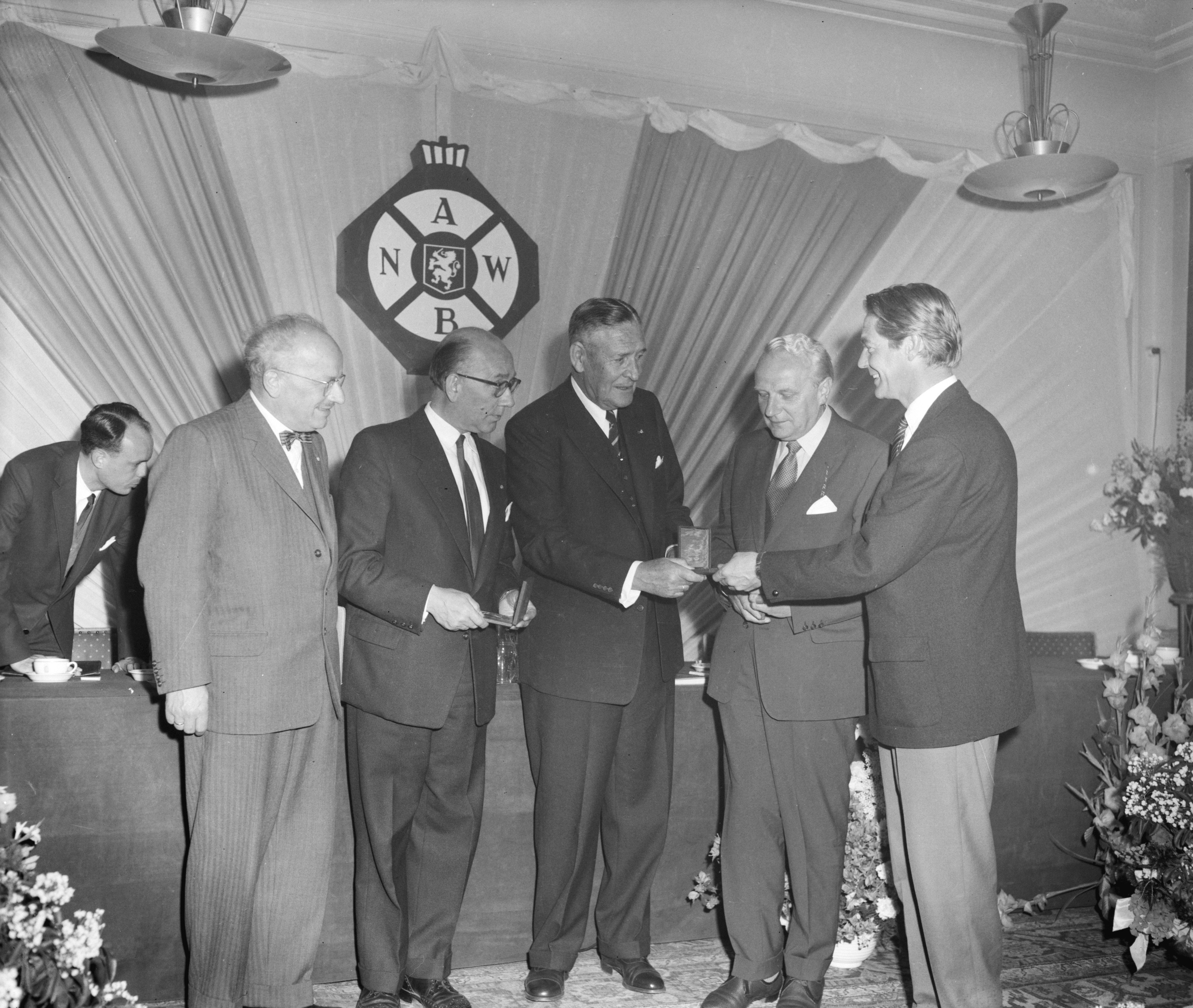
Jan Engelman (w. black glasses) 1958

Johannes Aloysius Antonius Engelman (born Utrecht, 7 June 1900; died Amsterdam, 20 March 1972) was a Dutch writer. He was the recipient of the Constantijn Huygens Prize in 1954. Dutch composers like Marius Monnikendam and Marjo Tal set several of his works to music.

== Works ==
- 1927 - Het roosvenster
- 1930 - Sine nomine
- 1931 - Parnassus en Empyreum
- 1932 - Torso
- 1932 - Tuin van Eros
- 1934 - Tuin van Eros en andere gedichten
- 1936 - Tympanon
- 1937 - Bij de bron
- 1937 - Het bezegeld hart
- 1942 - Noodweer
- 1945 - Vrijheid
- 1950 - Philomela
- 1955 - Koning Oedipus
- 1955 - Twee maal Apollo
- 1960 - Verzamelde gedichten
- 1969 - Het Bittermeer en andere gedichten
