= Kate Aldrich =

American mezzo-soprano (born 1973)

- Born: October 31, 1973 (age 52); Damariscotta, Maine, U.S.
- Occupation: Opera singer

Kate Aldrich (born October 31, 1973) is an American mezzo-soprano.

She has performed with the Metropolitan Opera, San Francisco Opera, Teatro Colón in Buenos Aires, the Hamburg State Opera, Teatro Regio (Turin), Rossini Opera Festival, Los Angeles Opera, Opéra de Montréal, the Deutsche Oper am Rhein in Düsseldorf, Teatro Nacional de São Carlos in Lisbon, National Theatre in Prague, and the New York City Opera.

Her roles include Carmen, Antoine Mariotte's Salome, Octavian in Der Rosenkavalier, Cesare and Sesto in Giulio Cesare, Isabella in L'italiana in Algeri, Rosina in Il barbiere di Siviglia, Angelina in La Cenerentola, Arsace in Semiramide, Zelmira in Zelmira, Fenena in Nabucco, Preziosilla in La forza del destino, Eboli in Don Carlos, Dalila in Samson et Dalila, Sesto in La clemenza di Tito, Giulietta in Tales of Hoffmann and Dulcinée in Don Quichotte.

Aldrich rose to international fame in 2001 through her starring role in the Zeffirelli production of Aida. That same year she won the CulturArte Award at the Operalia International Opera Competition, in 2006 she won the Alfréd Radok Award and the Thalia Award in the Czech Republic.

== Filmography ==
- Verdi, Aida (Zeffirelli, 2001)
- Roberto Alagna and Friends (2005)
- Rossini, Zelmira (Rossini Opera Festival, 2009)
