= Cor de Groot =

Dutch musician

Cor de Groot arriving and playing piano

Cor de Groot (July 7, 1914 – May 26, 1993) was a Dutch pianist and composer.

He was born in Amsterdam. He studied piano with Egbert Veen and Ulferts Schults, and composition and conducting under Sem Dresden. In 1932 he graduated with highest honours, playing a piano concerto written by himself. After becoming a soloist with the Concertgebouw Orchestra, he won the fifth prize at the 1936 international contest for pianists in Vienna. He played all over the world and recordings that exist demonstrate a strong sense of structure, a clean rhythmic attack and very precise dynamic shadings. He was a member of the Queen Elisabeth Music Competition's jury in 1956.

In 1959 a nervous disorder developed in his right hand but he continued playing repertoire for the left hand. He arranged more than 80 pieces for the left hand; his Apparitions, voor piano (linkerhand alleen) (1961) were described by one reviewer as "intense and expressive piano music that should make it a joy for a pianist to develop his left hand." Slowly he regained power over his right hand. He became musical director of the Dutch Broadcasting Foundation and promoted Dutch contemporary music. He made many recordings but also continued composing. His compositions include music for piano solo such as Variations imaginaires (1967); orchestral music; vocal work; and chamber music such as Sonatine pastorale for oboe and piano (1961). It has been stated that Dutch composer Gerard Schurmann composed his Bagatelles (1945) for de Groot, but this is not, in fact, the case. He died in Amsterdam in 1993.
