= Shine (Edenbridge album) =

Studio album by Edenbridge
- Released: 25 October 2004
- Recorded: 2004 House of Audio, Seagull Music Studio, Farpoint Station Studio
- Genre: Symphonic metal, power metal
- Length: 53:53
- Label: Massacre Records
- Producer: Dennis Ward

Edenbridge chronology
Aphelion (2003)	Shine (2004)	The Grand Design (2006)

Shine is the fourth studio album by the Austrian symphonic metal band Edenbridge. Produced by Dennis Ward, it features 10 tracks that have been compared to the style of Edguy, Stratovarius and Masterplan.

== Reception ==
Professional ratings
Review scores
Source	Rating
Metal Hammer Germany	5/7
Rock Hard	8.5/10
Scream Magazine)	5/6

The German edition of Metal Hammer awarded 5 out of 7 points but noted that singer Sabine Edelsbacher could not convey as much pathos as Amy Lee, Sharon den Adel or Tarja Turunen. She was instead found reminiscent of Candice Night when singing slower, medievally inspired tracks. The reviewer for Rock Hard wrote that Edenbridge had found a balance between romanticism and kitsch, but requested more uptempo tracks.

== Track listing ==
No.	Title	Length
1.	"Shine"	8:30
2.	"Move Along Home"	4:41
3.	"Centennial Legend"	5:16
4.	"Wild Chase"	5:32
5.	"And the Road Goes On"	8:10
6.	"What You Leave Behind"	4:41
7.	"Elsewhere"	2:18
8.	"October Sky"	5:11
9.	"The Canterville Prophecy"	1:49
10.	"The Canterville Ghost"	7:45
Total length:		53:53

Korean edition bonus tracks
No.	Title	Length
11.	"On Sacred Ground" (also in European edition)	6:04
12.	"Anthem" (also in Japanese edition, instrumental reprise of "Elsewhere")	2:28
Total length:		62:25

== Credits ==
=== Musicians ===
- Sabine Edelsbacher – vocals
- Lanvall – guitar, bass, keyboards
- Roland Navratil – drums
- Andreas Eibler – guitar

=== Guest musicians ===
- Dennis Ward – backing vocals
- Astrid Stockhammer – violin

=== Productions ===
- Mixed by Dennis Ward
- Mastered by Jürgen Lusky
- Cover Design by Thomas Ewerhard, idea by Mike Koren
