= Antoine Mariotte =

French composer, conductor and music administrator (1875-1944)

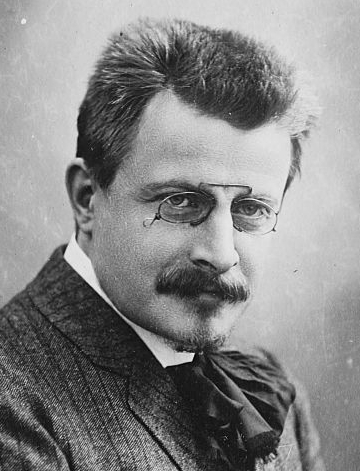
Antoine Mariotte

Antoine Mariotte (22 December 1875 – 30 November 1944) was a French composer, conductor and music administrator.

== Biography ==
Mariotte was born in Avignon (Vaucluse) in 1875. After studies at the School of Saint-Michel in Saint-Étienne, he entered naval school aged 15.

In 1894, while serving on the frigate Iphigénie, he wrote to a friend that he missed music and if he had the means he would go to the Conservatoire de Paris. While still split between the life of a sailor and musician, he worked away on harmony. He took part in campaigns on board the Forfait in the South China Sea, then on the Vinh-Long, where he witnessed the closing stages of the Sino-Japanese War. He brought back sketches that became the suite Kakémonos, initially written for the piano, but later orchestrated and performed at the Concerts Poulet on 29 January 1923 (Panorama, Geishas, Temple au Crépuscule, Fête).

In the Far East he read the Oscar Wilde play Salome, and decided to set it to music. On return to Europe, he sailed on the Marceau then the Magenta where finally, thanks to Admiral Gervais, he had a piano. On six months leave he followed a course at the Conservatoire by Charles-Marie Widor. After prolonging his absence, he resigned from the navy in 1897. He entered the Schola Cantorum where he was taught by Vincent d'Indy, who found him work as a pianist at the home of the comte de Chambrun, to whom he played each day for precisely 60 minutes, in particular the 32 sonatas of Beethoven in chronological order.

Due to his mother's health, he went back to Saint-Étienne and taught piano and became an organist, also directing the symphonic society; he also wrote an operetta Armande. Appointed professor of piano at the Lyon Conservatoire, he completed the score of Salomé, believing himself to have permission from Wilde's estate and the publisher Methuen. In fact, having obtained the agreement to use the play, Richard Strauss had in turn asked his publisher Fürstner to acquire the rights. Wilde's particularly complicated estate led to a court case that favoured the rights of Fürstner. Mariotte learnt that Fürstner would oppose the production of a "Salomé française" and after going to Berlin, he obtained permission to have his piece staged, on condition that 40% royalties went to Richard Strauss and 10% to Fürstner, with all scores to be sent after the run to Fürstner to be destroyed. Romain Rolland, having read an article by Mariotte in the Revue internationale de musique, helped him to obtain a more generous settlement from Strauss. On 30 October 1908, Mariotte's opera was produced at the Grand-Théâtre de Lyon with success (de Wailly in the title role), and staged in 1910 at the Gaîté-Lyrique in Paris, while Strauss's Salomé was on at the Opéra. After having been performed at Nancy, Le Havre, Marseille, Geneva, and Prague, Mariotte's Salomé was seen at the Opéra on 1 July 1919 with Lucienne Bréval. In November 2005 the Opera National de Montpellier juxtaposed the Strauss and Mariotte operas. Mariotte's Salomé was produced by Wexford Festival Opera in October 2014.

During the war, Mariotte was sent to Salonica where he contracted malaria. After the end of the war, in 1920 he became director of the Conservatoire d'Orléans where he taught René Berthelot, who succeeded him. He led the direction of the Opéra-Comique from 1936 to 1939.

He died in Izieux, (Loire) in 1944, aged 68.

== Compositions ==
Mariotte's works use a wide range of operatic effects with particularly striking choral writing. He displayed a robust temperament in both tragedy and lighter music.

On 28 February 1913 he presented in Lyon a tragédie lyrique, Le Vieux Roi on a libretto by Rémy de Gourmont, which, despite a successful launch, failed after its third performance.

His three-act comédie musicale Léontine soeurs premiered at the Théâtre Trianon Lyrique on 25 May 1924 and was published later that year. Esther, princesse d'Israêl, a three-act tragédie lyrique after André Dumas and Sébastien-Charles Leconte was created at the Opéra on 28 April 1925, Gargantua ('scenes rabelaisiennes' in 4 acts) was seen at the Opéra-Comique on 15 February 1935 and revived in 1938, and Nele Dooryn a three-act 'conte lyrique' (libretto by Camille Mauclair) was given five performances at the Opéra-Comique in 1940.

In 1930 he wrote a Cantate pour le centenaire de la Conquête de l'Algérie, played with enthusiasm in Algiers.

In 1934 came the symphonic version of Impressions urbaines, five pieces for piano (Usines, Faubourgs, Guingettes, Decombres, Gares) premiered by Édouard Risler in 1921, which depict the hard human and physical nature of Paris in expressive and sometimes violent means. There was also a Paysage maritime — a "sketch for harp and orchestra", part of an unfinished sea symphony, a sonata for piano and some songs.

== Bibliography ==
- A. Payre, Antoine Mariotte, Saint-Étienne, Les Amitiés, April 1935
- Gustave Samazeuilh, Musique et Radio, June 1951
- A. Thomazi, Trois marins compositeurs, Roussel, Mariotte, Jean Cras, Paris, Imprimerie Bellemand, 1948
