= The Grand Design (album) =

Studio album by Edenbridge
- Released: 19 May 2006
- Genre: Symphonic metal, progressive metal
- Length: 42:49
- Label: Massacre Records
- Producer: Lanvall

Edenbridge chronology
Shine (2004)	The Grand Design (2006)	MyEarthDream (2008)

The Grand Design is the fifth studio album by the Austrian symphonic metal band Edenbridge.

== Reception ==
Professional ratings
Review scores
Source	Rating
About.com	3/5 stars
Metal Hammer Germany	4/7
Rock Hard	7.0

The album received mixed professional reviews. The German edition of Metal Hammer as well as Rock Hard wrote that the songs varied between melodic metal and kitsch. Metal Hammer's reviewer observed, however, that singer Sabine Edelsbacher could match the timbre of Tarja Turunen. Also About.com compared Edelsbacher's singing to Nightwish but called the overall style of the album symphonic progressive metal.

== Track listing ==
No.	Title	Length
1.	"Terra Nova"	7:09
2.	"Flame of Passion"	5:22
3.	"Evermore"	3:47
4.	"The Most Beautiful Place"	3:09
5.	"See You Fading Afar"	4:46
6.	"On Top of the World"	5:05
7.	"Taken Away"	4:14
8.	"The Grand Design"	10:17
Total length:		42:49

Bonus tracks
No.	Title	Length
9.	"Empire of the Sun"	5:23
10.	"For Your Eyes Only"	3:00
11.	"Thin Red Line"	5:58
12.	"The Silent Wake"	5:33
13.	"Images in the Sand"	3:17
Total length:		67:00

== Credits ==
=== Musicians ===
==== Edenbridge ====
- Sabine Edelsbacher - vocals
- Lanvall - guitar, keyboards
- Roland Navratil - drums
- Frank Bindig - bass guitar

==== Guest musicians ====
- Robby Valentine
- Dennis Ward
- Karl Groom
- Martin Mayr
- Astrid Stockhammer

=== Production ===
- Karl Groom, mixing and recording
