= Klasen =

Klasen is a surname of Dutch and German origin. Notable people with the surname include:

- Anna Klasen (born 1993), German tenniswoman
- Arno Klasen (born 1967), German racecar driver
- Jacqueline Klasen (born 1994), German footballer
- Karl Klasen (1909–1991), German jurist and banker
- Linus Klasen (born 1986), Swedish professional ice hockey player
- Sepp Klasen (1935-2023), Germand politician
- Stephan Klasen (1966-2020), German economist and professor
- Thomas Klasen (born 1983), German footballer and current football coach
