= Henri Zagwijn =

Dutch composer (1878–1954)

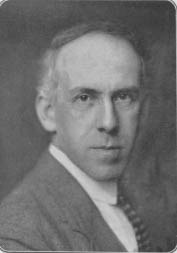
- Henri Zagwijn c. 1923
- Born: July 17, 1878; Nieuwer-Amstel, Netherlands
- Died: October 23, 1954; The Hague, Netherlands
- Occupations: Composer, music educator
- Known for: Chamber music, anthroposophic compositions
- Notable work: Der Zauberlehrling, Vom Jahreslauf, Concertante for piano and orchestra
- Movement: Impressionism, Anthroposophy

Henri Zagwijn (17 July 1878 – 23 October 1954) was a Dutch composer.

Born in Nieuwer-Amstel, Zagwijn never received a formal musical education, instead being almost completely self-taught in composition. He was attracted to the style of the Impressionists and began to compose in a manner reflective of trends then current in France. He gained an appointment to teach at the Rotterdam School of Music in 1916; two years later, with Sem Dresden, he founded the Society of Modern Composers in the Netherlands. Later in his career he settled in The Hague, and from 1931 taught at the Rotterdam Conservatory. An anthroposophic disciple of Rudolf Steiner, he published De muziek in het licht der anthroposophie in 1935; in 1940 he published a life of Claude Debussy. Zagwijn died in The Hague. His compositional output consists largely of chamber music.

== Selected works ==
- 1912: "Der Zauberlehrling", ballad for tenor, baritone, chorus and orchestra
- 1926: "Musik zur Eurythmie" for piano
- 1932: "String Sextet"
- 1937: "Morgenzang", a vocalise for soprano and ensemble
- 1938: "Vom Jahreslauf" for choir and orchestra, on a text by Rudolf Steiner
- 1939: "Concertante" for piano and orchestra
- 1941: "Concertante" for flute and orchestra
- 1941: "Mystère" for harp and piano
- 1946: "Concertante" for piano and orchestra
- 1948: "Concerto" for harp and orchestra
- 1949: "Ballade" for harp
- pub. 1952: Paraphrase over twee Nederlandse voksliederen (Paraphrases on two Dutch Folk Songs), for carillon
- pub. 1956: Variaties over het lied "Schoon jonkvrouw ik moet u klagen" (Variations on the Song "Schoon jonkvrouw ik moet u klagen"), for carillon
- pub. 1956: Vesper, for carillon
