= MyEarthDream =

Studio album by Edenbridge
- Released: 25 April 2008
- Recorded: 2008 at Farpoint Station Studio; Wild One Studio; The Isolation Chamber; The TrakShak; Studio A of the Czech Television
- Genre: Symphonic metal, gothic metal
- Length: 58:57
- Label: Napalm
- Producer: Lanvall

Edenbridge chronology
The Grand Design (2006)	MyEarthDream (2008)	Solitaire (2010)

MyEarthDream is the sixth studio album by the Austrian symphonic metal band Edenbridge. It is the first album by the band that was recorded with an orchestra, namely the Czech Film Orchestra. The music focuses on b-flat-tuned 7-string guitars and is darker and heavier than the band's previous releases.

== Reception ==
Professional ratings
Review scores
Source	Rating
About.com	3.5/5 stars
Metal Hammer Germany	6/7
Chronicles of Chaos	7.5/10

The German edition of Metal Hammer as well as the Sonic Seducer praised the quality of the production. The former noted the participation of Karl Groom and Mika Jussila (Stratovarius, Avantasia) while the latter magazine called the MyEarthDream the most intense album that had so far been released by Edenbridge. About.com's reviewer wrote of "well crafted songs and good musicianship" and observed that the band was best when they stayed within the symphonic metal genre without drifting too far into power metal.

== Track listing ==
All tracks are written by Arne "Lanvall" Stockhammer.

No.	Title	Length
1.	"The Force Within"	1:05
2.	"Shadowplay" (feat. Karl Groom)	5:25
3.	"Paramount"	4:24
4.	"Undying Devotion"	4:38
5.	"Adamantine"	6:15
6.	"Whale Rider"	4:13
7.	"Remember Me"	3:38
8.	"Fallen from Grace"	4:46
9.	"Place of Higher Power"	5:09
10.	"MyEarthDream Suite for Guitar and Orchestra" (digipack bonus track)	6:47
11.	"MyEarthDream"	12:37
Total length:		58:57

== Personnel ==
=== Band members ===
- Sabine Edelsbacher - lead vocals
- Arne "Lanvall" Stockhammer - lead, rhythm & acoustic guitars, keyboards & piano, bouzouki, pipa, producer
- Frank Bindig - bass guitar, growls

=== Guest musicians ===
- Sebastian Lanser - all drums on the album
- Robby Valentine - backing vocals & choirs
- Dennis Ward - backing vocals & choirs
- Karl Groom - 3rd guitar solo on "Shadowplay"
- Czech Film Orchestra conducted by Jaroslav Brych

=== Production ===
- Orchestral score by Enrique Ugarte
- Produced by Lanvall
- Mixed by Karl Groom
- Mastered by Mika Jussila
- Cover design by Anthony Clarkson
- Layout design by Thomas Ewerhard
