= Edenbridge (band) =

Austrian symphonic metal band

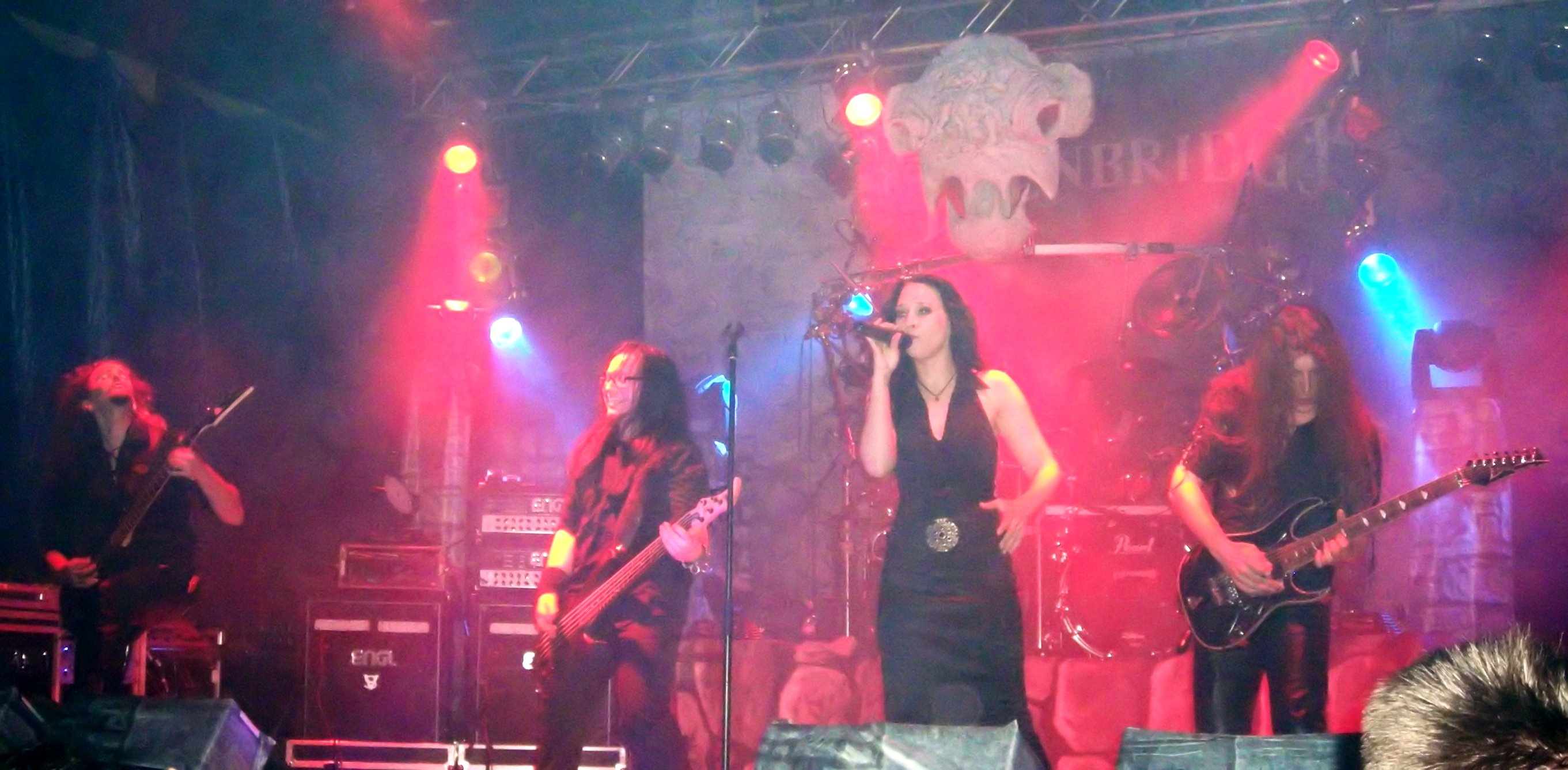
- Edenbridge performing in 2008. L–R: Sebastian, Bindig, Edelsbacher, Lanvall

Background information
- Origin: Austria
- Genres: Symphonic metal, power metal, progressive metal
- Years active: 1998–present
- Labels: eOne, SPV, Marquee Avalon, Soyuz, Rock Empire, Evolution, AFM
- Members: Sabine Edelsbacher; Arne "Lanvall" Stockhammer; Sven Sevens; Johannes Jungreithmeier; Stefan Gimpl
- Past members: Wolfgang Rothbauer; Max Pointner; Kurt Bednarsky; Andreas Eibler; Roland Navratil; Georg Edelmann; Frank Bindig; Robert Schoenleitner; Sebastian Lanser; Simon Holzknecht; Dominik Sebastian
- Website: www.edenbridge.org/en/

Edenbridge is an Austrian symphonic metal led by songwriter Arne "Lanvall" Stockhammer and fronted by soprano singer Sabine Edelsbacher. Established in 1998, the band has released twelve studio albums so far.

== History ==
=== Formation and first four albums ===
Edenbridge was formed in 1998 by guitarist and keyboardist Arne "Lanvall" Stockhammer, singer Sabine Edelsbacher, and bassist Kurt Bednarsky. The line-up was completed when drummer Roland Navratil joined the band. Edenbridge entered the recording studio in 1999, signing a record deal with Massacre Records the same year. In the following year, their debut album Sunrise in Eden was released.

The band added a second guitarist, Georg Edelmann, to its line-up in February 2000, but his stay with the band was to be a short one. When he left in January 2001, he was replaced by Andreas Eiblar. Under this line-up, Edenbridge released the album Arcana (2001). During a tour in 2002, Edenbridge's bassist and founding member Kurt Bednarsky left the band. In December 2003, the album Aphelion was released.

Their next album, recorded live and entitled A Livetime In Eden, was released in August 2004, followed by the studio album Shine in October. At that time, a new bassist, Frank Bindig, joined the band. In December the same year, guitarist Andreas Eibler left the band and was replaced by Martin Mayr.

=== Napalm Records and more personnel changes ===
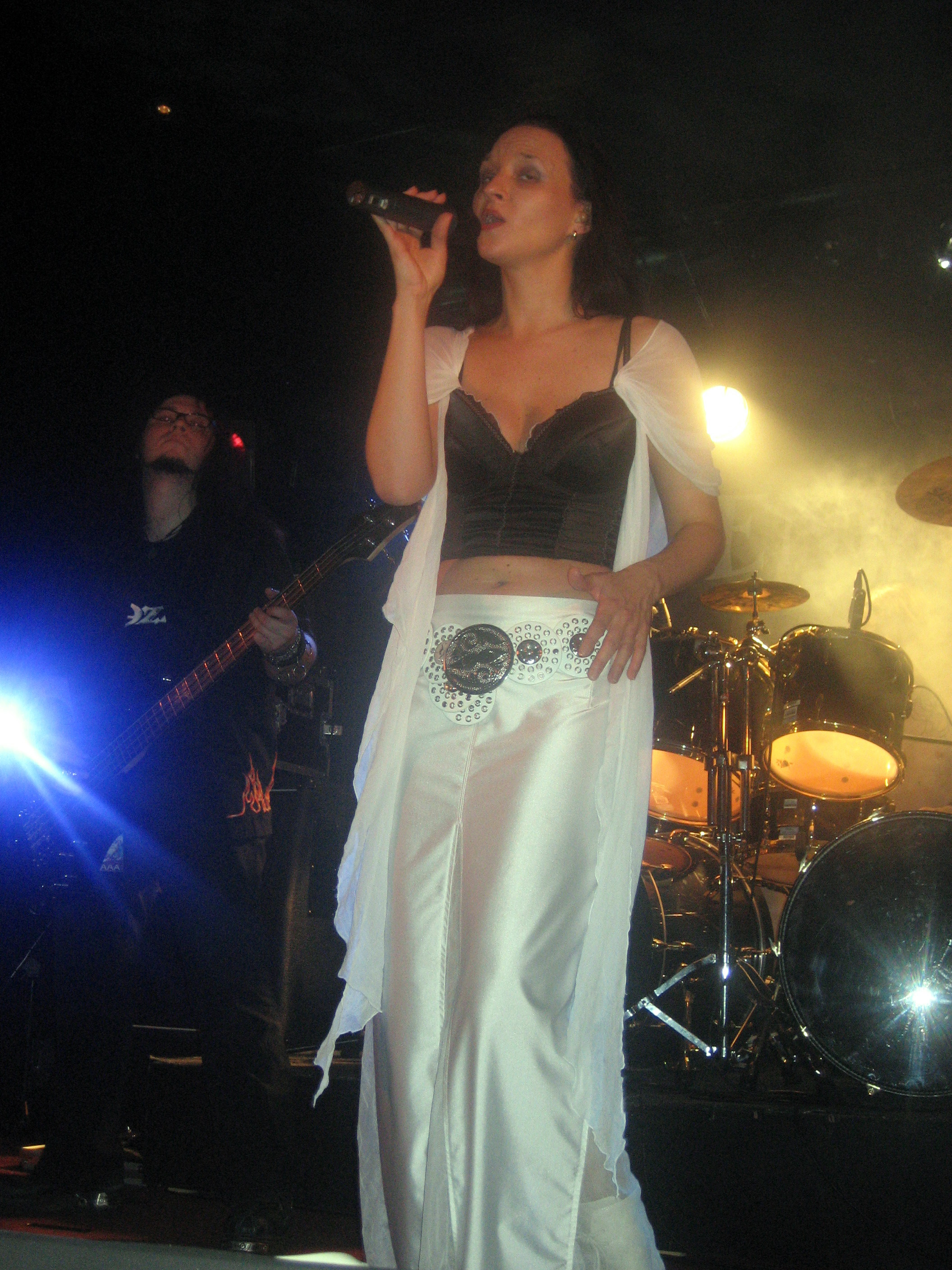
Sabine Edelsbacher and Frank Bindig in 2006

The Grand Design (2006), their fifth studio album, was recorded at Lanvall's studio Farpoint Station and was released on 19 May 2006 in Europe, and on 30 January 2007 in America. The single "For Your Eyes Only" was released on 21 April 2006 featuring the album track "Evermore" and a cover version of the James Bond theme of "For Your Eyes Only", the first cover the band ever recorded. The following year, Edenbridge signed a worldwide deal with Napalm Records.

Edenbridge released MyEarthDream in April 2008. The album features the Czech Film Orchestra, with arrangements by Enrique Ugarte. In November 2008 bass player Frank Bindig left, and he was replaced the next year by Simon Holzknecht; Dominik Sebastian joined on guitar. A few days later, on 4 May 2009, Edenbridge released LiveEarthDream, a limited-edition live album recorded in 2008.

Solitaire was released on 2 July 2010 and charted at number 95 in Germany. In February 2010, bassist Simon Holzknecht left the band.

In 2012, the band asked fans to help sponsor the new album's orchestra recordings. In late 2012, all orchestra and drum recordings had been completed. Bassist Wolfgang Rothbauer who formerly played for Disbelief and Zombie Inc. joined Edenbridge in 2013. The eighth studio album The Bonding was released in June 2013.

Lanvall and Sabine began a side project, "Voiciano", in February 2014. It focuses exclusively on acoustical music and released their first album, Everflow, in 2014.

In November 2014 the band announced their first video album, called A Decade and a Half... The History So Far to celebrate their 15th anniversary. The video album contains early beginnings of the band, tour and studio documentaries and live concerts from 1998 to 2014. The album was released on 8 May 2015.

The ninth studio album, The Great Momentum, was released on 17 February 2017. It reached position 80 in the Swiss album charts and 82 in Germany.

On 26 August 2022, they released their eleventh studio album titled Shangri-La. The album is the band's first album under AFM records.

== Band members ==
=== Current ===
- Sabine Edelsbacher – vocals (1998–present)
- Arne "Lanvall" Stockhammer – guitars, keyboards, instruments, orchestration (1998–present)
- Johannes Jungreithmeier – drums (2016–present)
- Stefan Gimpl – bass (2017–present)
- Sven Sevens – guitar (2023–present)

=== Touring and session ===
- Andreas Oberhauser – bass (2002)
- Mike Koren – bass (2003)
- Stefan Model – bass (2003)

=== Former ===
- Kurt Bednarsky – bass (1998–2002)
- Roland Navratil – drums (1998–2007)
- Georg Edelmann – guitar (2000)
- Andreas Eibler – guitar (2001–2004)
- Frank Bindig – bass (2004–2008)
- Martin Mayr – guitar (2005–2006)
- Robert Schoenleitner – guitar (2006–2008)
- Sebastian Lanser – drums (2007)
- Max Pointner – drums, percussion (2007–2016)
- Dominik Sebastian – guitar (2008–2023)
- Simon Holzknecht – bass (2009–2010)
- Wolfgang Rothbauer – bass (2013–2016)

Timeline

== Discography ==
=== Studio albums ===
- Sunrise in Eden (2000)
- Arcana (2001)
- Aphelion (2003)
- Shine (2004)
- The Grand Design (2006)
- MyEarthDream (2008)
- Solitaire (2010)
- The Bonding (2013)
- The Great Momentum (2017)
- Dynamind (2019)
- Shangri-La (2022)
- Set the Dark on Fire (2026)

=== Live albums ===
- A Livetime in Eden (2004)
- LiveEarthDream (2009)
- Live Momentum (2017)

=== Compilation albums ===
- The Chronicles of Eden (2007)
- The Chronicles of Eden, Part 2 (2021)

=== Singles ===
- Shine (2004)
- For Your Eyes Only (2006)
- Shiantara (2016)
- The Moment Is Now (2017)
- Live and Let Go (2019)
- On the Other Side (2019)
- Tauerngold (2020)
- Higher (Acoustic Version) (2021)
- Somewhere Else But Here (2022)
- Road to Shangri-La (2022)
- The Call of Eden (2022)

=== Music videos ===
- Higher (2010)
- Alight a New Tomorrow (2013)
- The Moment Is Now (2017)
- On the Other Side (2019)
- The Road to Shangri-La (2022)
- The Call of Eden (2022)

=== Lyric videos ===
- Shiantara (2016)
- Live and Let Go (2019)
- Somewhere Else but Here (2022)

=== Video albums ===
- A Decade and a Half... The History So Far (2015)
