= Adolph Fürstner =

German publisher

Adolph Fürstner (1833–1908) was a German publisher. He worked as a clerk for Bote & Bock before he founded his own publishing company, 'Fürstner', in Berlin in 1868. He bought the publishers Gustav Mayer of Leipzig and Meser of Dresden in 1872. In 1900 he formed a contract with Richard Strauss and later published his opera Salome.
