= Going Off on One =

Live album by The Tangent
- Released: June 26, 2007
- Recorded: November 4, 2004 – September 2006
- Genre: Progressive rock
- Length: 142:56
- Label: Inside Out
- Producer: Andy Tillison

The Tangent chronology
A Place in the Queue (2006)	Going Off on One (2007)	Not as Good as the Book (2008)

Professional ratings
Review scores
Source	Rating
DPRP	(8.5/10)

Going Off on One is the second live album released by the international progressive rock group The Tangent. It was released as a double CD/single DVD format (available separately), but also as a limited special edition, containing both CDs and the DVD, plus a deluxe digipack cover with enhanced artwork and extended booklet.

== Track listing ==
Songs that appear on the DVD were recorded live at Club Riga, England, in September 2006. Tracks 10–13 (disc two's first four tracks) were recorded on May 1, 2005 at RoSfest, at The Colonial Theater, Phoenixville, PA. "America" is the "missing piece" from the show recorded and released as Pyramids and Stars.

=== Disc one ===
No.	Title	Length
1.	"GPS Culture"	10:23
2.	"The Winning Game"	11:34
3.	"In Earnest"	22:08
4.	"Forsaken Cathedrals"	6:01
5.	"The Music That Died Alone"	10:53
6.	"Lost in London"	8:46
Total length:		69:45

==== Disc two ====
No.	Title	Length
7.	"In Darkest Dreams Part 1"	16:16
8.	"After Rubycon"	4:30
9.	"In Darkest Dreams Part 2"	6:32
10.	"The World We Drive Through"	13:26
11.	"Skipping the Distance"	8:43
12.	"Fun with the Audience"	3:20
13.	"21st Century Schizoid Man (King Crimson cover)"	11:25
14.	"America (arr. by Emerlist Davjack)"	8:59
Total length:		73:11

The DVD contains extras featuring a 1981 concert by Andy's band "A New Opera" (with Lindsay Frost, David Million, David Albone, and Simon Albone). There is also Tangent rehearsal footage show on a single video camera at Mushroom Studios in Rayleigh, Essex.

=== DVD version ===
1. "GPS Culture"
2. "The Winning Game"
3. "In Earnest"
4. "Forsaken Cathedrals"
5. "The Music That Died Alone"
6. "Lost in London"
7. "In Darkest Dreams Part 1"
8. "After Rubycon"
9. "In Darkest Dreams Part 2"

== Personnel ==
- Andy Tillison - lead vocals and keyboards
- Sam Baine - keyboards and vocals
- Krister Jonsson - electric guitar
- Guy Manning - acoustic guitar, percussion and vocals
- Jonas Reingold - bass guitar
- Jaime Salazar - drums
- Theo Travis - saxophone and flute
- Roine Stolt - guitar on "America"
- Zoltan Csörsz - drums on "America"
- Ed Unitsky - album artwork
- Martin Kornick - album artwork
