= Secrets & Lies (album) =

Studio album by Jakko M. Jakszyk
- Released: 23 October 2020
- Recorded: 2014–2020
- Genre: Progressive rock, art rock, world music
- Length: 49:29
- Label: InsideOut Music
- Producer: Jakko Jakszyk

Jakko M. Jakszyk chronology
Waves Sweep the Sand (2009)	Secrets & Lies (2020)

Singles from Secrets & Lies
- 1. "The Trouble With Angels" Released: 14 August 2020; 2. "It Would All Make Sense" Released: 11 September 2020; 3. "Uncertain Times" Released: 12 October 2020

Secrets & Lies is the eighth solo album by English musician Jakko M. Jakszyk, released on 23 October 2020 by InsideOut Music. It is his first release since 2009's Waves Sweep the Sand. Showcasing his diversity and many of his influences, it features progressive rock pieces that originated from King Crimson writing sessions, intimate ballads, and excursions into world music. The album was promoted by the release of three singles and accompanying music videos: "The Trouble With Angels", "It Would All Make Sense", and "Uncertain Times".

== Songs ==
=== Writing ===
"Separation" and "Uncertain Times" were initially written as King Crimson songs, while other songs were co-written with different musicians. "Before I Met You" and "It Would All Make Sense" were based on two pieces Jakszyk co-wrote with Italian musicians Nicola Lori and Stefano Panunzi. "Fools Mandate" was co-written with Van Der Graaf Generator vocalist and guitarist Peter Hammill. "Under Lock & Key" was co-written with Fripp and features his Frippertronics tape looping technique. Jakszyk based "Secrets, Lies & Broken Memories" on the chord changes of "Secrets and Lies" from the Dizrhythmia Too album. "The Borders We Traded" was not included on but relevant to Jakszyk's The Road to Ballina project. Its coda, "Trading Borders", was written by Jakszyk's daughter, Amber.

=== Lyrics ===
The album's lyrics deal with a variety of topics. "Before I Met You" is based on Jakszyk's "memories of a novel by Julian Barnes from the 80s. It tells the tale of a middle aged man who walks out on his wife and child for a much younger woman ... She had previously worked as an actress, and had appeared in several mediocre movies ... He sees his new wife commit 'virtual' adultery on the screen. This triggers a kind of irrational retroactive jealousy." "The Trouble With Angels" is inspired by both real and fictional events, drawn from Jakszyk's own experience and the Wim Wenders film Wings of Desire. However, "It Would All Make Sense" and "Under Lock and Key" are both inspired entirely by Jakszyk's experiences. In the album's liner notes, he writes, respectively: "It appears you can write about something that happened to you from a distance of 20 odd years, that you just couldn't address at the time. Especially if you were in denial, and all the evidence you ignored points to the truth," and "looking back at our lives we can see how one chance meeting, or moment, can fundamentally change the whole course of our future. Sometimes you might try to work out what might have happened had that event never taken place, or a decision been reversed. And one day you might even get to share those thoughts with someone whose life changed as a result of those decisions too."

"Fools Mandate" and "Uncertain Times" are both politically charged songs. Regarding "Fools Mandate", Jakszyk states that he combined Hammill's lyrical idea, which wasn't "particularly related to anything," with one of his own regarding the troubles in the Middle East. "Uncertain Times" concerns what Jakszyk describes as the "populist agenda of the leave vote" empowering xenophobic extremism. "The Rotters Club is Closing Down" is a tribute to Hatfield and the North drummer Pip Pyle, with the lyrical idea forming after Jakszyk attended his 2006 funeral. As previously mentioned, "The Borders We Traded" was related to Jakszyk's The Road to Ballina project, which he describes as "a piece using speech as part of the composition and telling the story of my adoption and the lives of my real and adopted family." The song itself "describes two places. Where my birth mother ended up and arguably where our story began." "Separation" is about narcissism.

=== Recording ===
"Fools Mandate" was based on an instrumental composition Jakszyk had begun and sent to Hammill as a collaborative effort. When he received the track, Hammill had added vocals and additional guitar, with Jakszyk overdubbing his vocal afterward. "Secrets, Lies & Stolen Memories" was written to be played as part of promotional appearances for Jakszyk. When recording the studio version, he states that "having 'fake' strings gave the impression of an orchestral feel, but my old pal Nigel Hopkins specializes in re-creating an orchestra in an infinitely more convincing manner." "Trading Borders" was originally recorded by Jakszyk on his iPhone, as his daughter began to play it on a public piano at Euston Station. This original recording was joined to the end of the studio recording for the album. "Separation" made its first appearance in an edited form on the 2014 edition of The Elements of King Crimson. Jakszyk details the song's creation: "Between the making of A Scarcity of Miracles and the formation of the current line up of King Crimson, Robert Fripp would come by my studio to show, play and teach me various new ideas, lines and compositions. I made sure that all these were recorded to a click. I went through all the parts and started editing and creating a new song and arrangement. Adding sections, playing some of Robert's parts that were in a different tempo. I also span in some of Robert's soloing and sent my finished piece to both Gavin [Harrison] and Tony [Levin]. Mel [Collins] came 'round to add saxes and I asked Peter Hammill to contribute some backing vocals."

== Release ==
Prior to the album's full release, "The Trouble With Angels", "It Would All Make Sense", and "Uncertain Times" were each released as a digital single with an accompanying music video, each being directed by Iranian filmmaker Sam Chegini. These singles were released to digital stores and streaming services on 14 August 11 September, and 12 October, respectively. The full album was released on 23 October as a digital and streaming album, like the singles, as well as other formats: one was a CD/DVD-A bundle including a 5.1 mix of the album and the music videos for "The Trouble With Angels", a behind-the-scenes video, and "It Would All Make Sense". The other was an LP/CD bundle, available in three color choices of black, blue, and yellow vinyl. The initial physical release of Secrets and Lies were supplied in limited numbers.

== Reception ==
Professional ratings
Review scores
Source	Rating
All About Jazz	4/5 stars
Louder Sound	3.5/5 stars

The initial reception of the album was positive. John Kelman of the website All About Jazz published a favorable review of the album, rating it four stars. He says the album is "an eclectic, unfettered collection of songs which, perhaps more than any that have come before, reflect Jakszyk's broadest musical dispositions and subject matter ... Secrets & Lies may have taken fourteen years to germinate after the wonderful Bruised Romantic Glee Club and accompanying Waves Sweep the Sand, but it's been worth the wait because it stands on its own as a remarkably successful collection of material. It also shines a particularly powerful spotlight on Jakszyk's evolution as performer, songwriter and conceptual thinker. ... As a fine addition to Jakszyk's small but significant leader discography, the thoroughly authoritative Secrets & Lies will be of interest to any who appreciate a heterogenous approach to songwriting and interpretation that, when ultimately brought together, becomes a more homogeneous whole."

Philip Wilding of the publication Louder Sound published a more brief review of the album with a slightly worse rating of three and a half stars. However, his words were mostly positive, stating that "King Crimson guitarist Jakko Jakszyk's solo album Secrets & Lies charts the sublime to the ridiculous ... [it's] an album that bristles with pain and rejection but still thrills with melody and invention. Especially good are the lingering "The Rotters Club Is Closing Down" and the frenetic and thrilling "Separation.""

== Track listing ==
All selections written by Jakko Jakszyk, unless otherwise noted.

Side A
No.	Title	Writer(s)	Length
1.	"Before I Met You"	Jakszyk, Lori, Panunzi	5:41
2.	"The Trouble with Angels (For Kimberly)"		5:30
3.	"Fools Mandate"	Jakszyk, Hammill	4:13
4.	"The Rotters Club Is Closing Down (A Song for Pip)"		4:06
5.	"Uncertain Times"	Jakszyk, Harrison	5:00
Total length:			24:46

Side B
No.	Title	Writer(s)	Length
6.	"It Would All Make Sense"	Jakszyk, Lori, Panunzi	5:25
7.	"Secrets, Lies & Stolen Memories"		2:45
8.	"Under Lock & Key"	Jakszyk, Fripp	4:06
9.	"The Borders We Traded"		3:05
10.	"Trading Borders"	Alexandrea Jakszyk	2:32
11.	"Separation"	Jakszyk, Fripp	6:43
Total length:			24:42

DVD Audio Content: Stereo and 5.1 Surround
No.	Title	Length
1.	"Before I Met You"	5:41
2.	"The Trouble with Angels"	5:30
3.	"Fools Mandate"	4:13
4.	"The Rotters Club Is Closing Down"	4:06
5.	"Uncertain Times"	5:00
6.	"It Would All Make Sense"	5:25
7.	"Secrets, Lies & Stolen Memories"	2:45
8.	"Under Lock & Key"	4:06
9.	"The Borders We Traded"	3:05
10.	"Trading Borders"	2:32
11.	"Separation"	6:43
Total length:		49:29

DVD Video Content
No.	Title	Length
1.	"The Trouble With Angels (Official Video)"	5:30
2.	"It Would All Make Sense (Official Video)"	5:25
3.	"The Trouble With Angels (The Making Of)"	4:17
Total length:		15:12

== Personnel ==
Musicians

- Jakko Jakszyk – guitars (1–8, 10–11), keyboards (1–6, 8, 10–11), vocals (1–6, 8–9, 11), programming (3), low whistles (10)
- Peter Hammill – guitar and vocals (3), backing vocals (11)
- Robert Fripp – guitar (8, 11), Frippertronics (8)
- John Thirkell – trumpet (1, 5)
- Mel Collins – saxophones (11)
- Mark King – bass (1)
- Tony Levin – bass (2, 8, 11)
- Django Jakszyk – bass (4–5)
- John Giblin – bass (6)
- Gavin Harrison – drums (1–2, 5–6, 8, 11), percussion (9)
- Al Murray – drums (4)
- Alexandrea Jakszyk – backing vocals (2), piano (10)
- Nigel Hopkins – orchestral arrangements and "Mockestra" (7)

Technical

- Jakko Jakszyk – production
- Ben Darlow – mastering
- Ray Shulman – DVD authoring
- David Singleton – management
