= A Scarcity of Miracles =

Studio album by Jakszyk, Fripp and Collins
- Released: May 30, 2011
- Genres: Ambient; progressive rock; jazz fusion
- Length: 42:22
- Label: Discipline Global Mobile
- Producers: Jakko Jakszyk and Robert Fripp

A Scarcity of Miracles is the sole album by Jakszyk, Fripp and Collins, released in 2011. It united singer and guitarist Jakko Jakszyk with three musicians best known from King Crimson: guitarist Robert Fripp, saxophonist Mel Collins and bassist/Chapman Stick player Tony Levin. Porcupine Tree member Gavin Harrison was featured on drums. Jakszyk and Harrison would go on to play in the next incarnation of King Crimson, along with Fripp, Levin and the returning Collins.

Presented as "a King Crimson ProjeKct" (or R&D spin-off), the album started as a series of improvisations between Jakszyk and Fripp, with Collins adding his parts later. Levin and Harrison joined in near the end of the process, once Jakszyk had shaped the material into songs with fully formed melodies and lyrics.

== Background ==
Originally the frontman for eccentric English progressive pop band 64 Spoons, Jakko Jakszyk had an intermittent solo career (as well as putting in a stint as guitarist for Level 42), leading the one-off Dizrhythmia project (with Gavin Harrison) and working with a variety of musicians including Dave Stewart & Barbara Gaskin, Swing Out Sister, Jansen Barbieri Karn and Tom Robinson. Between 2002 and 2007, he sang and played guitar for 21st Century Schizoid Band, a project set up to reunite King Crimson members from the 1960s and 1970s lineups of the band and to play the band's music from that period. This brought him closer into the King Crimson circle, as did his 2006 solo album The Bruised Romantic Glee Club which included contributions from various King Crimson members (including Robert Fripp and Mel Collins), as well as covers of two tracks by the band.

For The Bruised Romantic Glee Club, Fripp had invited Jaksyzk to build new songs on the foundations of existing Fripp soundscapes. For what would become A Scarcity of Miracles, the two recorded new improvised instrumental sessions together in Wiltshire, England with no particular intention of making an album. With Fripp's agreement, Jakszyk took the resulting recordings and again reworked them into full songs. Collins (a frequent Jakszyk collaborator) subsequently "heard unplayed sax waiting to be given voice" and joined the developing project. With the majority of the music now recast, a full album took shape. Levin and Harrison (the latter another longstanding Jakszyk friend and collaborator) subsequently recorded the rhythm tracks.

== Reception ==
Professional ratings
Review scores
Source	Rating
All About Jazz	positive
PopMatters	positive

Reviewing A Scarcity of Miracles in All About Jazz, John Kelman commented that "it may lack the sharp corners, jagged edged and harder surfaces of latter-day Crimson, and there's none of the overt symphonic prog of early Crim, but Jakszyk's refined vocals, soft-spoken playing and haunting songwriting, Fripp's searing lines and orchestral soundscaping, and Collins' soaring soprano sax melodies make for the best group record—Crimson or no—to come from the Fripp camp in nearly thirty years."

With A Scarcity of Miracles tagged as "a King Crimson ProjeKct", speculation arose that it might be the basis of the next line-up of King Crimson (the main band itself having been on hiatus since 2008, and having described earlier works entitled ProjeKcts as research and development work since 1997). Like the covers of many King Crimson albums produced by Discipline Global Mobile, the cover of A Scarcity of Miracles featured a painting by P J Crook, providing an additional conceptual link. At the time, Fripp himself gently denied and clarified the project's position by describing the record as "one of my favourite albums of those where I am a determining element. It has the Crimson gene, but it is not quite KC." However, when a new seven-person line-up of King Crimson was announced in September 2013, it consisted of all five musicians involved in the album plus longtime Crimson drummer Pat Mastelotto and drummer/keyboardist Bill Rieflin. This line-up went on to be the longest continuous one in King Crimson history (later adding drummer Jeremy Stacey in 2016), and performed a couple of Miracles pieces as part of their live set (the title track and "The Light of Day") during 2014–2016.

== Track listing ==
All compositions by Jakszyk/Fripp/Collins

1. "A Scarcity of Miracles" (7:27)
2. "The Price We Pay" (4:49)
3. "Secrets" (7:48)
4. "This House" (8:37)
5. "The Other Man" (5:59)
6. "The Light of Day" (9:02)

== Personnel ==
- Jakko Jakszyk – guitars, vocals, guzheng, keyboards
- Robert Fripp – guitars, soundscapes
- Mel Collins – alto and soprano saxophones, flute

Additional personnel

- Tony Levin – bass guitars, Chapman Stick
- Gavin Harrison – drums, percussion

Production personnel

- David Singleton – original recording engineer (DGM)
- Jakko Jakszyk – additional recording and mixing engineer (Silesia)
- Trev Wilkins and Chris Porter – additional engineering
- Jakko Jakszyk and Robert Fripp – mixing
- Simon Heyworth and Robert Fripp – mastering
- P.J. Crook – cover art
- Hugh O'Donnell – package art and design
