= A Place on the Shelf =

Compilation album by The Tangent
- Released: June 12, 2009
- Genre: Progressive rock
- Length: 57:47 (regular edition); 75:50 (initial release)
- Label: self-released
- Producer: Andy Tillison

The Tangent chronology
Not as Good as the Book (2008)	A Place on the Shelf (2009)	Down and Out in Paris and London (2009)

A Place on the Shelf, is a 2009 compilation album of songs not finished or released on studio albums by the English progressive rock group The Tangent. The title is a play-off their third album's title A Place in the Queue. The initial release through the band's website featured three bonus tracks on the CD. It was later released as a 5-song album on Andy Tillison's Bandcamp page.

"Le Massacre du Printemps" is Tillison's version of the Igor Stravinsky piece The Rite Of Spring. "Everyman's Forgotten Monday" was originally on the album "Lifecycle" by Gold Frankincense & Diskdrive. "I Wanna Be A Chick" was originally recorded in 2008 for Down and Out in Paris and London. Originally written for release on Not as Good as the Book, the controversial epic "Live On Air" is based on the events of the 7 July 2005 London bombings.

== Track listing ==
All tracks are written by Andy Tillison.

No.	Title	Length
1.	"Le Massacre du Printemps Part 1"	11:42
2.	"Everyman's Forgotten Monday"	5:09
3.	"I Want to Be a Chick"	4:32
4.	"Live on Air"	21:41
5.	"Le Massacre du Printemps Part 2"	14:44
Total length:		57:47

Original Pressing Bonus Tracks
No.	Title	Length
6.	"A Sale of Two Souls" (Live at the Boederij, Holland 2008)	7:04
7.	"The Ethernet 1992"	5:25
8.	"Special Po90 Preview – Backup"	5:34
Total length:		75:50

== Personnel ==
- Andy Tillison – keyboards, electric guitar, and vocals
- Jonathan Barrett – bass guitar
- Paul Burgess – drums
- Theo Travis – saxophone and flute
- Guy Manning – acoustic guitar and vocals
