= La Voce Del Vento =

La Voce Del Vento is a fictional Italian band created by Guy Manning & Andy Tillison in order to provide long suites for the Colossus Music Project albums
These pieces were:
'HARMONICA' - created for the Spaghetti Epic #1 Project (Based upon the film 'Once Upon A Time In The West')
'BAD' - created for the Spaghetti Epic #2 Project (Based upon the film 'The Good, The Bad & The Ugly')
