= Luke Machin =

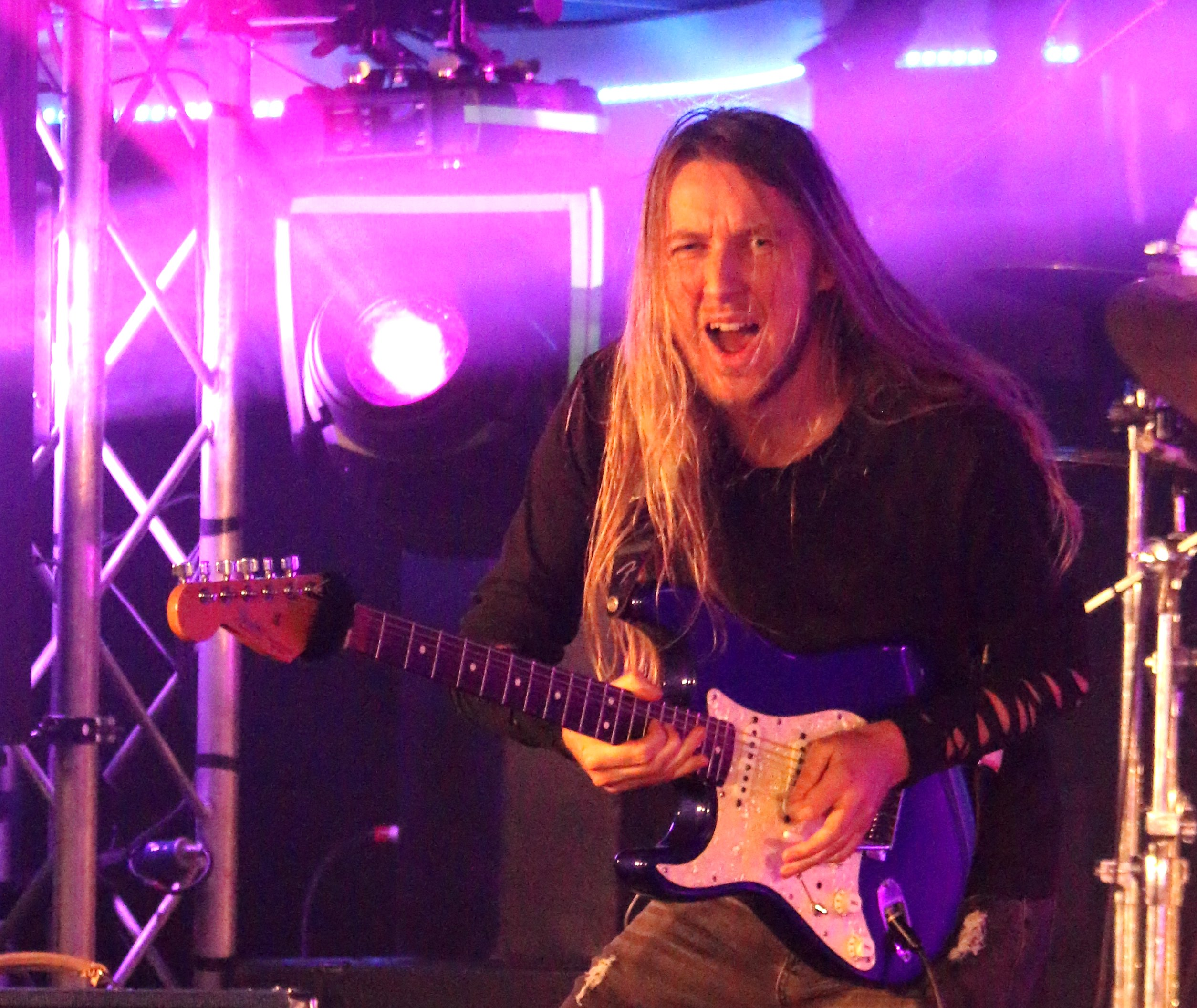
- Machin with Karnataka in 2023

Background information
- Born: 22 November 1988 (age 37); Congleton, Cheshire, United Kingdom
- Genres: Progressive rock, progressive metal
- Occupation: Guitarist
- Years active: 2008–present
- Label: Soulshine Music
- Member of: The Tangent; Karnataka; Maschine; Cyan
- Formerly of: Francis Dunnery

Luke Machin (born 22 November 1988) is an English guitarist, composer and record producer known as a member of The Tangent, Francis Dunnery's It Bites and Karnataka, as well as founding member of Maschine and Soulshine. He has been named in Prog Magazine's top ten guitarists of the year for 4 years, alongside Steve Hackett, Guthrie Govan, Steve Howe, David Gilmour and Steve Rothery.

== Biography ==
Machin started playing guitar at age 2 or 3. He studied at Brighton Institute of Modern Music (BIMM) between 2007 and 2010, playing under Guthrie Govan and with the likes of Jeff Beck, Francis Dunnery, Pain of Salvation and Robert Plant, by the age of 22.

Machin formed Maschine in 2008 while studying at BIMM. The band consists of Machin (guitar, vocals), Dan Mash (bass, vocals), Marie-Eve De Gaultier (keyboards, vocals), Andy Morgan (guitar, vocals), James Stewart (drums). Maschine have released two albums Rubidium (2013) and Naturalis (2016). The band are influenced by Pain of Salvation, It Bites and many other prog and non related prog artists.

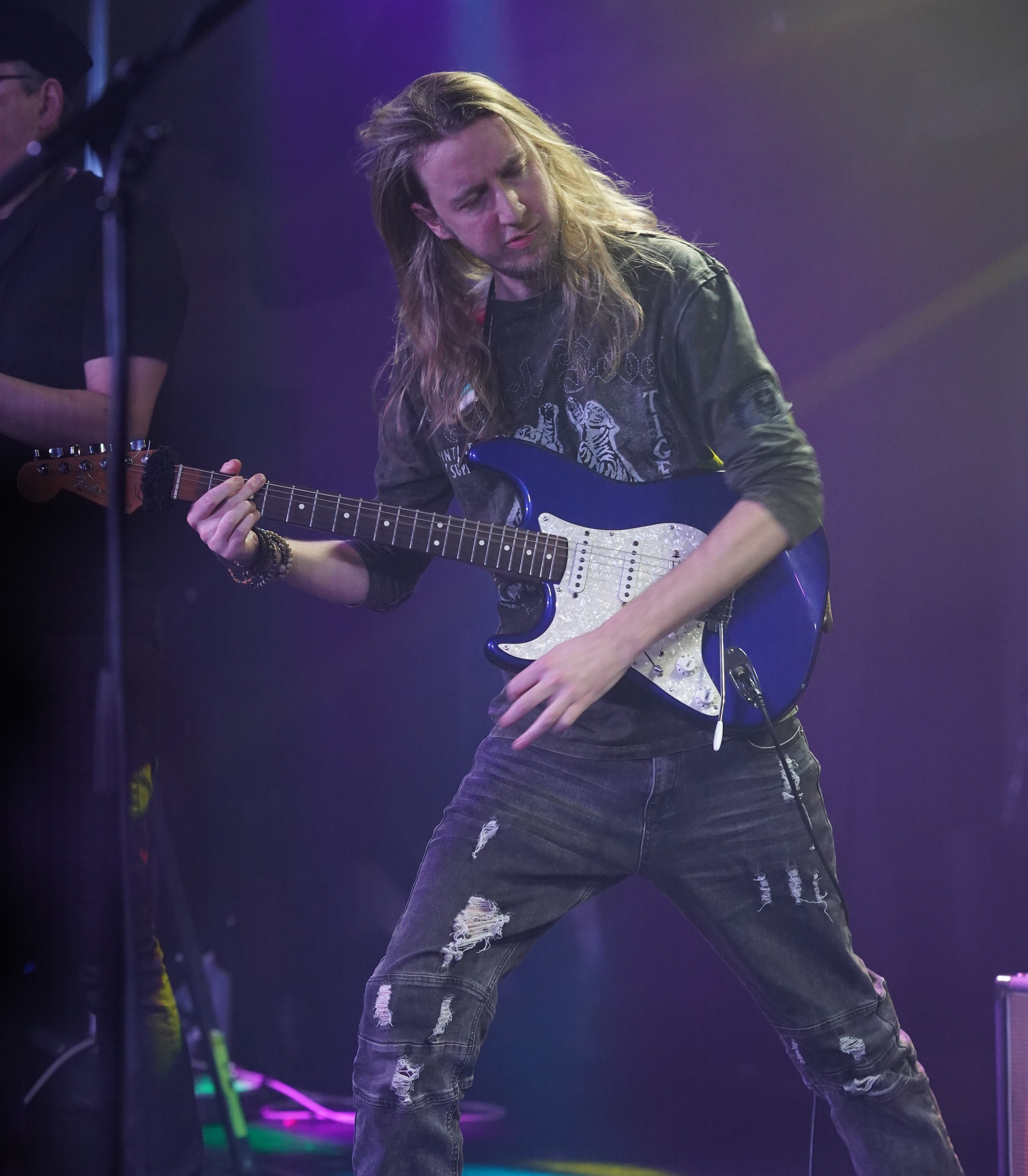
Machin with The Tangent in 2023

In late 2011, Machin and Mash joined The Tangent, with band leader Andy Tillison describing Machin as an "unbelievable musician". Mash and Machin parted ways with Tillison in 2012 due to Tillison's financial struggles. However, Tillison referred Machin to Thomas Waber to get the band signed to prog label InsideOut Music.

Around this time Machin auditioned for Pain of Salvation but didn't take the role due to his commitment to Maschine and geographical issues, though he did guest with the band in 2012.

Machin re-joined The Tangent for their 2015 album A Spark in the Aether, and has remained a member ever since. Contributing to later albums including The Slow Rust of Forgotten Machinery (2017), Proxy (2018), Auto Reconnaissance (2020), Songs From the Hard Shoulder (2022).

In January 2018, Machin joined Francis Dunnery's IT BITES playing guitar, sampling, triggering, vocals and keyboards alongside Francis Dunnery, Paul Brown, Peter Jones, Bjorn Fryklund and Quint Starkie up to 2023. The band released 1DVD/CD, Live from the black country.

In November 2018, Machin joined Welsh progressive rock band, Karnataka, as a guest guitarist, however he has stayed with the band to the present, contributing to their 2023 album, Requiem for a Dream.

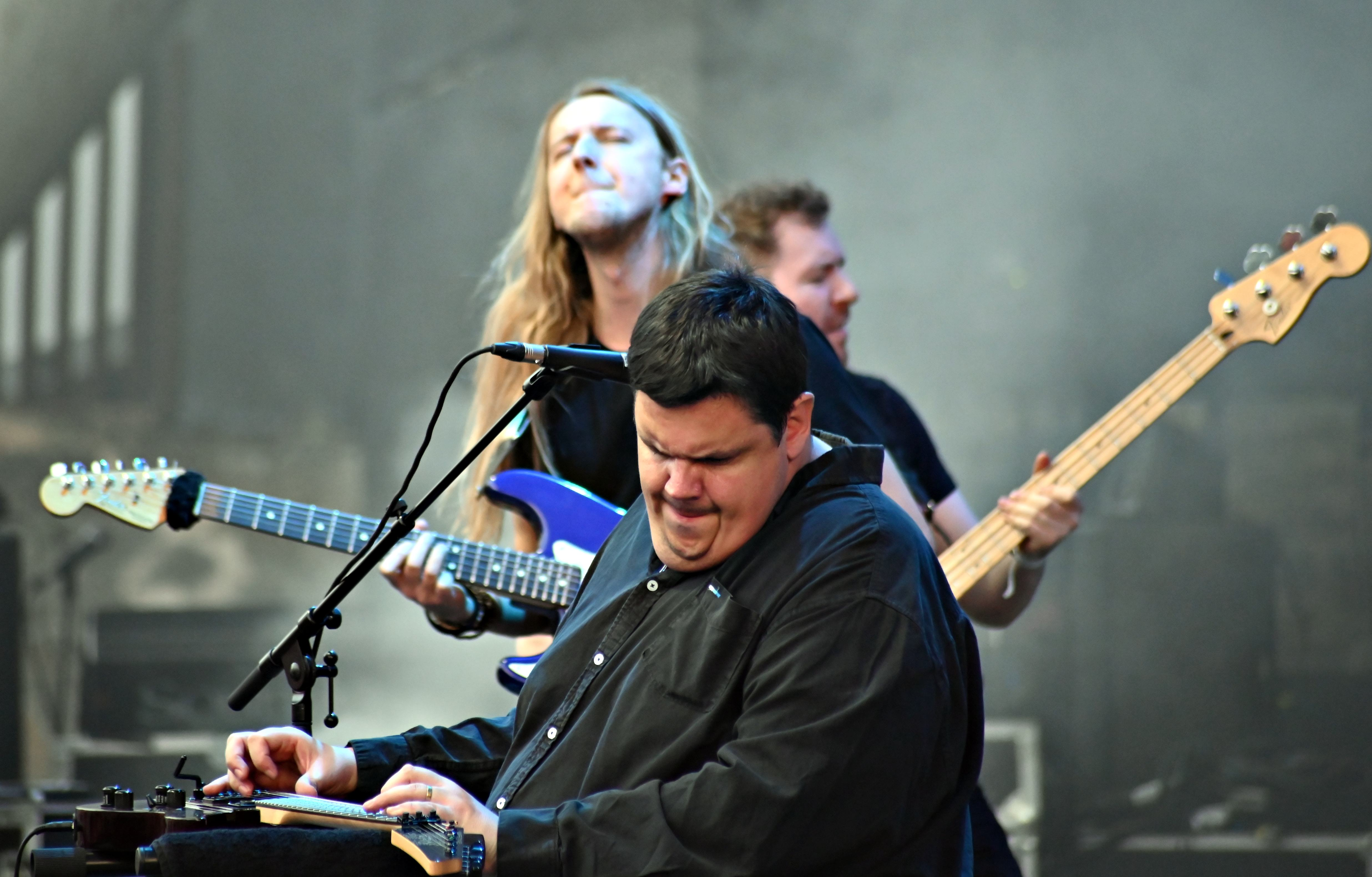
Machin (left), Pete Jones and Dan Nelson performing with Cyan in 2023

In March 2021, Machin announced his debut solo album, Soulshine. Which will include guest appearances from Marco Minnemann, Guthrie Govan, Francis Dunnery (It Bites), Jonas Reingold (Steve Hackett, The Tangent) and Daniel Gildenlöw (Pain of Salvation).

In August 2021, Machin joined a revived Cyan. A project by Magenta keyboardist Rob Reed and Camel multi-instrumentalist Peter Jones. He appears on their albums, For King And Country (2021) and Pictures from the Other Side (2023).

== Discography ==
Year	Artist	Title	Notes
2009	Francis Dunnery	There's A Whole New World Out There	Guitar on "Let Us All Go (New Version)"
2011	The Tangent	Going Off On Two	Guitar, vocals
2011	The Tangent	Comm	Guitar, vocals
2011	Andy Tillison Diskdrive	Murk	Guitar on "Energise"
2011	Cosmograf	When Age Has Done Its Duty	Guitar solo on "Bakelite Switch"
2013	Cosmograf	The Man Left In Space	Lead guitar on "We Disconnect"
2013	The Tangent	L’Étagère Du Travail (The Shelf Of Work)	Guitar on "The Iron Crows (From Claude Debussy's "La Mer")"
2013	Maschine	Rubidium	Vocals, guitar and keyboards
2014	The Andy Tillison Multiplex	Electric Sinfonia No. 2	Assistant producer
2015	The Tangent	A Spark In The Aether (The Music That Died Alone - Volume Two)	Guitars
2016	Kiama	Sign Of IV	Guitars and assistant engineering
2016	Maschine	Naturalis	Vocals, guitar, keyboards, engineering and artwork
2017	The Tangent	The Slow Rust Of Forgotten Machinery (Or "Where Do We Draw The Line Now ?")	Guitar, vocals
2017	Damanek	On Track	Electric guitar
2017	Tiger Moth Tales	The Depths Of Winter	Lead guitar on "Winter Maker"
2018	Tangekanic	Hotel Cantaffordit	Guitar, vocals and photography
2018	Damanek	In Flight	Electric guitar on 4 tracks
2018	The Tangent	Proxy	Electric guitar, acoustic guitar and "Adam's Apple"
2019	Seven Steps To The Green Door	The? Lie	Main guitar
2020	The Tangent	Auto Reconnaissance	Guitars
2020	The Backstage	Isolation	Guitar on "Can I Have Your Number?"
2021	Illuminae	Dark Horizons	Lead and rhythm guitar alongside Steve Hackett
2021	Cyan	For King And Country	Lead guitars
2022	Francis Dunnery	The Big Purple Castle	Guitar
2022	The Tangent	Songs From The Hard Shoulder	Guitars, vocals
2023	Cyan	Pictures From The Other Side	Lead guitars
2023	The Tangent	Pyramids, Stars And Other Stories (The Tangent Live Recordings 2004-2017)	Guitars, vocals
2023	Karnataka	Requiem For A Dream	Lead and rhythm guitar
2023	Marek Arnold's Artrock Project		Guitar solo on "Papillon"
2023	It Bites FD	Live From The Black Country	Guitar, vocals
2024	John Holden	Proximity & Chance	Guitar on "Agents", guitar solo on "Chance (Under One Sun)"
2024	Cyan	The Guardians	Lead guitar
2025	Karmakanic	Transmutation	solo guitars (End of the Road), nylon acoustic guitar (End of the Road)
