= Guy Manning =

English musician

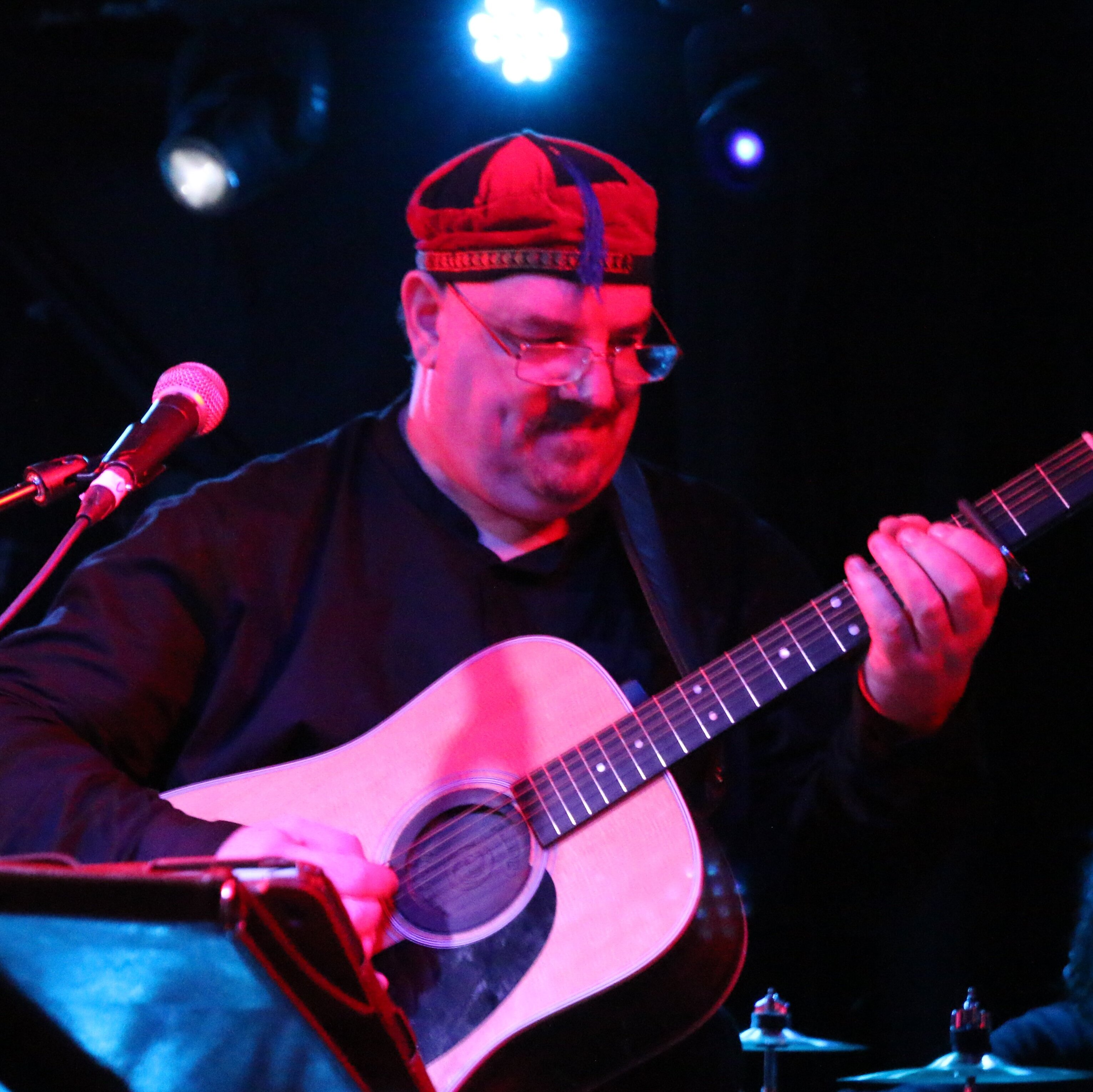
- Manning performing in 2018

Background information
- Born: Leeds, West Yorkshire, England
- Genres: Progressive rock, folk rock
- Instruments: Guitar; bouzouki; mandolin; keyboards; vocals
- Years active: 1999–present
- Labels: Festival Music (F2); Giant Electric Pea (GEP); Inside Out Music; Cyclops Records; ProgRock Records
- Website: Official Manning site; Damanek site

Guy Manning is an English multi-instrumentalist and singer, best known for his own album releases (Manning), the DAMANEK band albums and for his membership of progressive rock bands Parallel or 90 Degrees, The Tangent and The United Progressive Fraternity (UPF).

== Biography ==
Manning was the founding member of two Leeds based bands in the 1980s, Let's Eat! and Bailey's Return. He was also recruited in 1987 to be the keyboards player (joining Julie King) in art-rock band Through The Looking Glass. This band split up a year later and a more pop based offshoot, KingGlass, emerged which continued for a further year.

Manning and local keyboardist/vocalist Andy Tillison had an early unsigned band called Gold Frankincense & Disk Drive. This band's final line-up included David Albone on drums and a guest spot from Van der Graaf Generator organ player Hugh Banton. One piece by this line-up, "A Gap in the Night", was later included on Parallel or 90 Degrees' The Corner of My Room before being reworked for the second album by The Tangent.

Tillison and Manning also recorded the album No More Travelling Chess at this time, which consisted of a set of covers of material by Peter Hammill plus a couple of original pieces. This album was first released as a mail order cassette item (before an augmented and remastered version was eventually released by Cyclops Records in 2001 under the band name of Parallel or 90 Degrees).

Tillison and Manning then formed the new band, Parallel or 90 Degrees, with Sam Baine also on keyboards.

Manning has gone on to release his own albums, five for the Cyclops label and three more for USA label, ProgRock Records. With a further change of record label, the 2007 release, Songs From The Bilston House was released on the Festival Music (F2) label based in the UK (as have all subsequent Manning album releases).

Tillison played on several of these albums, while special guests have included Martin Orford (IQ), Ian 'Walter' Fairbairn (Hedgehog Pie & Jack the Lad), Stephen Dundon (Molly Bloom), Leon Camfield (Tinyfish), Marek Arnold (Seven Steps to the Green Door, Toxic Smile & Cyril), Chloe Herington (Knifeworld), Hugh Whittaker (The Housemartins), John Young (Lifesigns, John Young Band, Asia, Scorpions, Bonnie Tyler & more), Phideaux and Angela Gordon (Mostly Autumn).

The ProgRock Records album covers and also the later "Margaret's Children" (as the sequel to "Anser's Tree") were created by notable graphics artist, Ed Unitsky.

Manning and Tillison also teamed up as fictional Italian band La Voce Del Vento to provide two long pieces for the Colossus Project Discs (The Spaghetti Epics #1 and #2).

Manning has also provided an unreleased track "Top of the Mountain" for KINECTIONS, the US ProgDay festival support album.

In 2016, Manning assembled Marek Arnold, Dan Mash & Sean Timms to form a new band, Damanek. Damanek have released 3 albums to date on the GEP (Giant Electric Pea) Label.

In March 2022, Guy Manning announced a new collaborative project "The Patchwork Alliance".

In May 2024, Manning launched a crowdfunder for a limited vinyl 25th Anniversary edition of his debut album, "Tall Stories for Small Children".

A special '25th Anniversary' Birthday Show' with an 'All Stars' took place on 6 October 2024 at the Summers End Festival.

The band (Guy Manning's All Stars) consisted of Guy Manning plus Marek Arnold, Ulf Reinhardt and Andreas Gemeinhardt (all from Seven Steps to the Green Door), Simon Rogers (Also Eden), Dan Mash (Damanek, Maschine), Ariel Farber (Phideaux) and Julie King (Manning)

Guy Manning played an acoustic solo show at the Prog For Peart (Festival) Pre-party on 16 July 2026.

== Manning (the Bands) ==
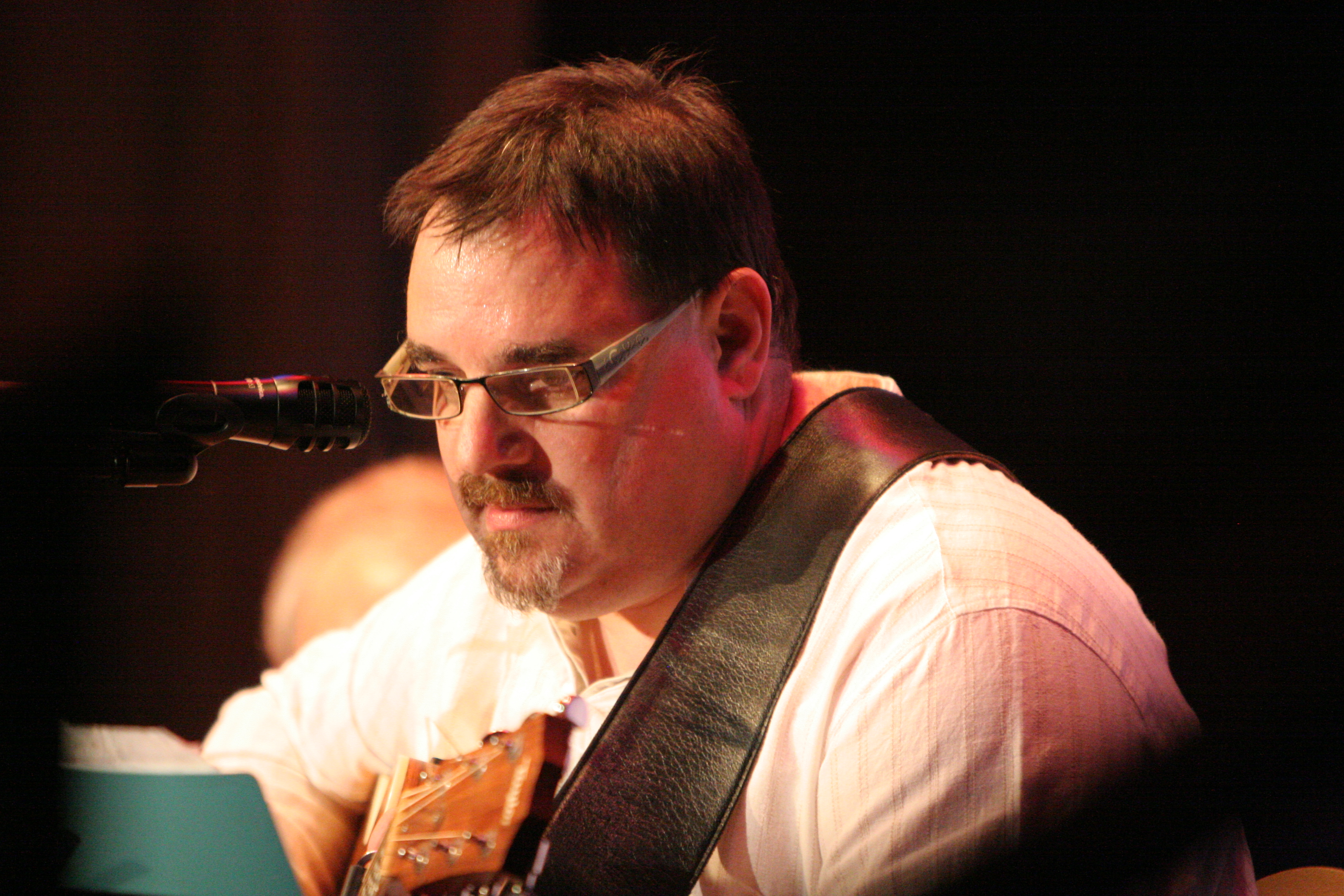
Manning in 2008

In April 2008, news appeared on the Classic Rock Society website stating that Manning had recruited a new band consisting of Kevin Currie, Kris Hudson-Lee, Julie King, Danny Rhodes and Phil Wilkes. The band (minus Julie King) debuted at the Classic Rock Society's Tribute to Rob Leighton concert in June 2008. Drummer Danny Rhodes left soon after and was replaced by former colleague, David Albone in 2009. The band performed at the prestigious Rites of Spring (ROSFest) Festival in Gettysburg, PA on 1 May 2010 debuting material from their album 'Charlestown' which was released in October 2010.

The MANNING live band was put on hold and retired in January 2014.

== Guy Manning and Damanek ==
The new band (DAMANEK) was formally announced at the start of 2016. Led by Guy Manning, Marek Arnold, Dan Mash (all of whom had worked together in UPF) plus Sean Timms (ex-Unitopia and now with his own new band, Southern Empire).

Other guest contributors have been Nick Magnus, Brody Thomas Green (Southern Empire), Cam Blokland (Southern Empire), Antonio Vittozzi (ex-Soul Secret), DavidB, Phideaux, Luke Machin (Maschine, Francis Dunnery, The Tangent, Kiama), Jonathan Barrett (The Tangent), Nick Sinclair, Ulf Reinhardt (Seven Steps to the Green Door), Tim Irrgang (UPF), Stephen Dundon (Molly Bloom), Julie King, Chris Catling, Kevin Currie, the Sanducci Horns, Raf Azaria (UPF), Tzan Niko, Amanda Timms, The Gospel Collective & Jones Commentary.

Recording for the debut album "On Track", was started in February 2016. The band debuted live on 2 October 2016 at Summers End Festival with the line-up announced 09/09/2016 of Guy Manning, Marek Arnold, Dan Mash, Sean Timms with Special Guests: Luke Machin and Henry Rogers.

On 14 March 2017, it was announced that the band had signed to top UK Independent label Giant Electric Pea (GEP) and that "On Track" would be released in May 2017.

In mid 2018, it was announced that the follow-up album "In Flight" would be released by GEP on 5 October 2018. A short tour of Europe and UK followed in November/December with joint headliners Southern Empire. Dan Mash left the lineup after the tour.

The third album "Making Shore" started into recording in May 2020, though it was severely delayed by the COVID pandemic. It was released on 13 January 2023 (again on the GEP label)

DAMANEK will headline the Prog for Peart Festival in July 2027 on the Saturday night as part of a co-headline Uk tour with the band Overhead (From Finland) The band are also working on album #4 (titled "Goes Forth") for expected 2027 release.

== Guy Manning and The Patchwork Alliance ==
In March 2022, Guy Manning announced a new collaborative project "The Patchwork Alliance" made up of himself as principal composer/lyricist plus other musical friends. The first track "The Baobab Tree" was released 01/03/2024 exclusively on Bandcamp.

Musical Friends/collaborators include: Simon Godfrey (Tribe of Names, Shineback, Tinyfish), Marek Arnold (Seven Steps to the Green Door, Cyril, ArtProject), Mark 'Truey' Trueack (Unitopia), Steve Unruh (Unitopia), Jon Axon (Genius The Fool), Joe Cairney (Comedy of Errors), Huw Lloyd-Jones & Simon Rogers (Also Eden), Gareth Cole (The Bardic Depths), Phil Stuckey (Stuckfish), Phideaux Xavier & Ariel Farber (Phideaux), Sean Timms (Unitopia) [as Producer], Adrian Fisher (Stuckfish) [as Producer], John Southerden, Julie King, Kevin Currie

== Guy Manning and Cyril ==
Damanek colleague Marek Arnold asked Manning to compose the majority of lyrics for Cyril's 2016 "Paralyzed" album. Following the critical success of this album, Guy was asked to provide all the lyrics and the concept narrative for 2019's "The Way Through". Manning also provides a cameo spoken dialogue on the recording.

In 2022, Cyril released a new album, "Amenti's Coin - A Secret Place Part 2", Guy once again provided the English lyrics and updates to the narrative storyline, plus a cameo spoken vocal.

== Guy Manning and The United Progressive Fraternity (UPF) ==
On 31 March 2014, a new band was formally announced, led by Mark 'Truey' Trueack, Matt Williams, Tim Irrgang and David Hopgood (ex-members of Unitopia) plus involving Guy Manning, Marek Arnold and Dan Mash (all from Damanek). The debut album Fall in Love With the World was released and included guest appearances by Jon Anderson, Steve Hackett, Steve Unruh, Ian Ritchie, Jonathan Barrett and Claire Vezina, among others. The band did a short promotional tour of UK/Europe in Autumn 2014 including that year's Summers End (X) Festival, Guy left the line-up shortly after that.

== Guy Manning and The Tangent ==
In 2001/2, plans for a solo album by Andy Tillison transformed into the first release by The Tangent, The Music That Died Alone (2003). This initial line-up included Manning and Sam Baine plus Roine Stolt, Jonas Reingold and Zoltan Csorsz from The Flower Kings, and David Jackson from Van der Graaf Generator. Other later Tangent members have included Theo Travis, Jaime Salazar, Krister Jonsson, Jakko Jakszyk, Jonathan Barrett, Luke Machin, Daniel Mash, Steve Roberts and Tony Latham.

On 11 May 2010, a statement appeared on the Guy Manning website indicating that he would no longer be partaking in any future Tangent activities, although he has provided Acoustic Guitar [cameo only] for 2013's "Le Sacre du Travail".

In all, Manning played on six official studio, two unofficial studio and one live album by The Tangent. See main article on The Tangent.

== Discography / contributions ==
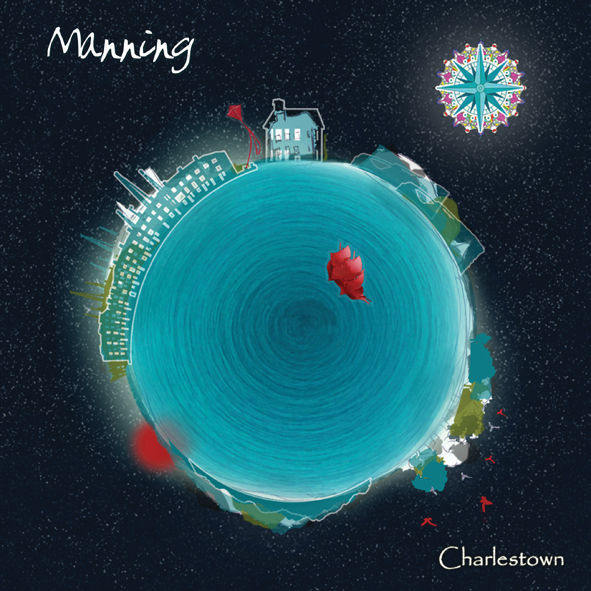
Cover of Charlestown

=== Guy Manning / Manning ===
- Tall Stories For Small Children (1999) as Guy Manning / (Remaster 2010) as Manning / 25th Anniversary Vinyl Edition as Guy Manning (2024)
- The Cure (2000) & (Remaster 2010)
- Cascade (2001) & (Reissue 2008)
- The Ragged Curtain (2002) & (Reissue 2013)
- The View From My Window (2003)
- A Matter of Life & Death [The Journal of Abel Mann] (2004)
- One Small Step... (2005) & (Remaster 2010)
- Anser's Tree (2006)
- Songs From The Bilston House (2007) & (Reissue 2010)
- Number Ten (2009) & (Reissue 2013)
- Charlestown (2010)
- Margaret's Children (2011)
- Akoustik (2012)
- The Root, The Leaf & The Bone (2013)
- Akoustik #2 (2014)

=== Damanek ===
- On Track (2017)
- In Flight (2018)
- Making Shore (2023)

=== The Patchwork Alliance ===
- Stitched Up (Started 2024)

=== Cyril ===
- Paralyzed (2016) - [Wrote lyrics for majority of album]
- The Way Through (2019) - [Wrote English lyrics for the whole album plus created the concept/narrative / Cameo Spoken Word performance]
- Amenti's Coin - A Secret Place Part 2 (2022) - [Wrote English lyrics for the whole album plus updated the concept/narrative / Cameo Spoken Word performance]

=== Marek Arnold's ArtRock Project ===
- Marek Arnold's ArtRock Project - [Wrote lyric for track "Papillion"]
- Marek Arnold's ArtRock Project - [Wrote lyric for track "Aiden"]

=== Seven Steps to the Green Door ===
- Fetish (2015) - [Wrote lyric for track "Set in Motion"]

=== Mark Rowen ===
- Radiance (2018) - [Provided synth on track "Lure of the Siren"]

=== The United Progressive Fraternity (UPF) ===
- Fall in Love with the World (2014)

=== La Voce Del Vento ===
- The Spaghetti Epic #1 (2005)
- The Spaghetti Epic #2 (2006)

=== The Tangent ===
==== Studio albums ====
- The Music That Died Alone (2003)
- The World That We Drive Through (2004)
- A Place in the Queue (2006)
- Not as Good as the Book (2008)
- Down and Out in Paris and London (2009)
- A Place on the Shelf (2010)
- Le Sacre Du Travail (2013) [Cameo Only]
- L'Etagère Du Travail (2013)

==== Live albums ====
- Going Off on One (2007)

=== Parallel Or 90 Degrees ===
- The Time Capsule (1998)
- No More Travelling Chess (1999)
- A Can of Worms (2009)
