= Not as Good as the Book =

Studio album by The Tangent
- Released: March 3, 2008
- Recorded: January 2006 – November 2007
- Genre: Progressive rock
- Length: 94:44
- Label: Inside Out
- Producer: Andy Tillison

The Tangent chronology
Going Off on One (2007)	Not as Good as the Book (2008)	A Place on the Shelf (2009)

Professional ratings
Review scores
Source	Rating
Maelstrom	8/10 stars
Allmusic	3/5 stars
DPRP	9.5/10 stars

Not as Good as the Book is the fourth studio album released by progressive rock group The Tangent. The Special Edition of the album includes a 100-page novella by Andy Tillison with illustrations by Antoine Ettori.

== Track listing ==
All words and music written by Andy Tillison.

=== Disc one - A Crisis in Mid-Life ===
No.	Title	Length
1.	"A Crisis in Mid-Life"	7:13
2.	"Lost in London 25 Years Later"	7:33
3.	"The Ethernet"	10:13
4.	"Celebrity Purée"	3:43
5.	"Not as Good as the Book"	8:54
6.	"A Sale of Two Souls"	7:16
7.	"Bat Out of Basildon"	5:54
Total length:		50:46

=== Disc two - Throwing Metal at the Sky ===
No.	Title	Length
1.	"Part One - Four Egos One War": I. "Ours"; II. "Theirs (incl. Ours Reprise)"; III. "His"; IV. "Mine"	21:15
2.	"Part Two - The Full Gamut": V. "The D599"; VI. "Gothenburg"; VII. "Last Tango"; VIII. "Studio Tan"; IX. "Not a Drill"; X. "Southend on Sea"; XI. "The A1 North of Paris"; XII. "Four Last Days"; XIII. "The D599 & The A61"	22:43
Total length:		43:58

"Four Egos One War" originally performed by Parallel or 90 Degrees.

== Personnel ==
- Andy Tillison – organ, piano, Moog synthesizer, guitars and vocals
- Guy Manning – acoustic guitar, mandolin, bouzouki and vocals
- Jonas Reingold – bass guitar
- Jaime Salazar – drums
- Theo Travis – saxophone and flute
- Jakko Jakszyk – guitars and vocals

With guests:

- Julie King – lead vocals on "Ours"
- Unknown Frenchman – violin on "A Crisis In Mid-Life"

Cover artwork by Antoine Ettori
