= Dr. Livingstone, I presume =

Dr. Livingstone, I presume may refer to:

- Dr. Livingstone, I presume?, a greeting supposedly given by Henry Morton Stanley upon locating David Livingstone in present-day Tanzania
- "Dr. Livingstone (I Presume)", a song by The Tangent from their 2017 album The Slow Rust of Forgotten Machinery
- "Dr. Livingstone (I Presume)", a song by System 7 from their 1994 album Point 3
- "Dr. Livingstone, I Presume" (song), a song from 1968 by The Moody Blues, from their 1968 album In Search of the Lost Chord
- Livingstone, I Presume? (video game), also called Livingstone, Supongo, a 1986 game about African exploration by Opera Soft, resp. Alligata
