= The Road to Ballina =

Studio album by Jakko M. Jakszyk
- Released: 1997
- Genres: Radio ballad; progressive rock
- Length: 48:03
- Producer: Jakko M. Jakszyk

The Road to Ballina is the fourth solo album by English musician Jakko M. Jakszyk. Unlike most of his other releases, it is a radio ballad composed of an equal mix of spoken word and musical content, originally created by Jakszyk and radio producer Simon Elmes and broadcast on BBC Radio 3 in 1996. In 2022, Jakszyk revived the project as a theatre production.

== Overview ==
In 1991, at the suggestion of his collaborator Tom Robinson, Jakszyk appeared on a BBC radio programme called Tuesday Lives (produced by Simon Elmes) in which "people recounted their extraordinary life stories". Jaksyzk's own story involved his difficult and sometimes painful childhood as an adopted child raised in a small Hertfordshire town by two married (but ill-suited) European refugees from World War Two, and about how he later re-discovered his birth mother Peggy Curran and relatives in the southern states of America. This episode of the programme was received particularly well by the audience, ensuring that Elmes wanted to work with Jakszyk again. Over the intervening years, the two discussed various ideas for other shows.

Following his departure from Level 42 in 1994, Jakszyk had been spending his time working simultaneously on solo songwriting projects and on composing soundtrack music for television programmes, notably for Lenny Henry's series Chef. In 1995, he visited Peggy's home town of Ballina, County Mayo, Ireland for the first time, describing it as "the most extraordinary revelation — I found out my mum had been quite a famous showband singer. I really felt like I'd found something that had been missing, and I felt very at home there. When I came back, I told Simon what a special trip it had been, and he came up with the idea of doing a programme about it, something which combined speech and music. I agreed to do it, but then immediately forgot all about the idea. Then I got a phone call to say that Radio 3 had officially commissioned it."

The Road to Ballina was founded on interviews with Jakszyk and his family members. Although Peggy Curran eventually declined to be interviewed (with her final contribution to the project restricted to a few phrases recorded down a telephone), the production team spoke to people who'd known her in Ireland.

Jakszyk's adoptive father Norbert, aged eighty-four, agreed to participate, and was flown back to his original Polish hometown of Ruda. Jakszyk: "We found his village, and recorded anything and everything onto DAT, train noises, station announcements... a lot of location sound effects, which I was able to use later to create soundscapes. The visual stimuli in Poland triggered some fantastic memories for my dad... (he'd) had some horrendous experiences in the Second World War... and every day we'd come back to the hotel and talk about his life. We also visited Auschwitz, where we recorded some conversations... that was really very weird, there was a very strong atmosphere about the place."

Jaksyk's adoptive mother Camille also spoke about her own French origins, wartime experience, and journey to England. The third and final part of the interviews consisted of Jakszyk's own autobiographical reminiscences of childhood, adolescence and the need to search for his true origins and place in the world.

"I had to select material from the interview DATs, and that was a nightmare. If I did something like this again, I would ask someone from the BBC for a transcription, but as it was, I was dealing with ten or twelve hours of unlogged material... The breakthrough came when I started working with some things my [adoptive] mum had said. There was a section where she was talking about adopting me, and there was this phrase, 'I wanted a child'. When I sampled it, playing it back, it had a little, lilting rhythm, and an element of melody to it. I thought it would be nice to have some child‑like, nursery‑rhyme‑like music accompanying it, so I came up with this piano figure. It fitted like magic, and I was off. That was the way in for me... I had to edit out whole chunks to propel the narrative, and the dialogue had to maintain an overall narrative structure, but within that, I was able to take certain sections of speech, repeat them, echo them, strengthen them, answer them or whatever."

— Jakko Jakszyk on creating a sonic structure for the project

Once the interviews were complete, Jakszyk set about adding music. Taking inspiration from Steve Reich's Different Trains and Frank Zappa's Frank Zappa Meets the Mothers of Prevention, his aim was to "make the speech and music integral to each other". Most of the music for the album was composed and performed on Jakszyk on keyboards and synthesizers, using a Yamaha DX7, a Casio CZ101 and an Akai S1000 sampler with "some Denny Jaeger violin samples", backed up by several sound modules (Roland MVS1, Yamaha TG33 and E-mu Proteus 2). Jakszyk also played guitars and flute, while his close collaborator Gavin Harrison played drums. Two of Jakszyk's Level 42 associates also contributed to the recordings - Gary Barnacle on saxophones and Mark King on bass guitar - with Caroline Lavelle providing cello.

Amongst his own original music, Jakszyk composed an Irish-inspired title theme inspired in part by the work of Davy Spillane, and in which he played Irish low whistle. He also composed "some music based on a three-four Polish mazurka rhythm. While we were in Poland, I thought it would be nice to buy some tapes of traditional music, but it was impossible. You'd go into a record shop, and it was all bloody Level 42 albums."

The original version of The Road to Ballina was broadcast on BBC Radio 3 on 15 December 1996. During 1997, Jakszyk re-mixed and partially re-recorded the project for its eventual CD release on Resurgence in 1997.

Jakszyk would go on to produce and broadcast a second radio ballad - The Church of Lanza, based on the life of Mario Lanza - but this production would not be released on record, nor would it be broadcast again after its first appearance.

== Theatrical production ==
In 2022 - twenty-five years after the album's release and twenty-six years after the initial broadcast version - Jakszyk reworked The Road to Ballina for a second time, this time as a theatre production. The initial idea for doing this came from technical producer Richard Turner, following which Karen Koren of the Gilded Balloon theatre company in Edinburgh suggested that Jakszyk developed the piece for the Edinburgh Fringe Festival in conjunction with a theatre director.

The finished product was performed by Jakszyk as a one-man show, directed by Michael Attenborough (a friend of Jakszyk since their mutual work in theatre in the 1980s) and with animations by Iranian video artist Sam Chegini (who'd worked with Jaksyzk on the video for his 2021 single "The Trouble with Angels"). The production ran at a venue within the National Museum of Scotland between 3 and 28 August 2022.

== Track listing ==
All tracks are written by Jakko Jakszyk.

No.	Title	Length
1.	"Introduction"	1:36
2.	"The Road to Ballina"	2:16
3.	"Camille's Story Part 1 - Childhood in Paris"	3:42
4.	"Camille's Story Part 2 - Marriage in Limoges"	3:42
5.	"Norbert's Story Part 1 - Ruda"	5:41
6.	"Norbert's Story Part 2 - The German Army"	5:36
7.	"I Wanted a Child"	4:53
8.	"My Story Part 1 - The House Was Always Empty"	6:26
9.	"My Story Part 2 - I Wondered Who the Hell I Was"	4:26
10.	"Walking Across Birkenau"	1:08
11.	"Reprise"	2:14
12.	"Return to Ballina"	5:33
Total length:		48:03

== Personnel ==
Per discogs

=== Musicians/speakers ===
- Jakko M. Jakszyk – guitars, keyboards, flute, low whistle, spoken word vocals, programming
- Camille Jakszyk - spoken word vocals
- Norbert Jakszyk - spoken word vocals
- Mark King – bass guitar
- Gavin Harrison – drums
- Gary Barnacle – alto, tenor & baritone saxophones
- John Thirkell – trumpet
- Caroline Lavelle - cello

=== Production ===
- Jakko M. Jakszyk – production, arrangements
- Simon Elmes - production for radio, dialogue recording, re-editing (9)
- John Calver - dialogue recording, original editing for radio, re-editing (9)
- Chris Thorpe - re-editing for CD release
- Elizabeth Farrer - additional arrangement (11)
