= Pyramids and Stars =

Live album by The Tangent
- Released: February 2005
- Recorded: November 3, 2004
- Venue: Colos-Saal, Aschaffenburg, Germany
- Genre: Progressive rock
- Length: 77:15
- Label: Progjam (fan release)
- Producer: Andy Tillison

The Tangent chronology
The World That We Drive Through (2004)	Pyramids and Stars (2005)	A Place in the Queue (2006)

Professional ratings
Review scores
Source	Rating
DPRP	7/10 stars

Pyramids and Stars is the third album, and first live recording, released by the progressive rock group The Tangent. Recorded during the band's first mini-tour, this album is the only live record of the band's original core line-up.

== Track listing ==
No.	Title	Length
1.	"The World We Drive Through"	14:46
2.	"The Canterbury Sequence"	9:15
3.	"The Winning Game"	12:15
4.	"Band Introductions"	1:29
5.	"The Music That Died Alone"	13:10
6.	"In Darkest Dreams"	20:39
7.	"Lucky Man (ELP cover)"	5:40
Total length:		77:15
