= 64 Spoons =

British rock/pop band

- Origin: Watford, England
- Genres: Pop, rock
- Years active: 1976–1980
- Label: Freshly Cut
- Past members: Jakko Jakszyk; Lyndon Connah; Tam Neal; Andy Crawford; Ted Emmett

64 Spoons (also known as the Legendary 64 Spoons, or simply the Spoons) were a British pop and rock band active during the late 1970s and early 1980s. Although the band never met with commercial success, its various members (Jakko Jakszyk, Lyndon Connah, Tam Neal, Andy Crawford and Ted Emmett) all went on to greater success.

== Sound and influences ==
Due to the formal musical training and tastes of the band members, 64 Spoons were a musically accomplished and eclectic band who merged "ten-minute collections of rich jazz chords, contrapuntal bass lines, and liquid guitar solos" with a strong sense of pop and bathetic English comedy. The band's progressive rock (Hatfield and the North, Egg, Gentle Giant, King Crimson, Allan Holdsworth), classical (Bartók, Delius) and avant-garde (Henry Cow, Frank Zappa) influences were mingled with disco, West Coast sounds, and various types of '60s and '70s pop. Jakko Jakszyk remembers that "We played our, at times, complex compositions with a punk-like ferocity and made sure that the lyrics to the songs were consciously unpretentious. Indeed, they contained a level of wit and imagery that would embarrass a Carry On scriptwriter. There were musical and visual jokes aplenty. Three years into our career and we were once memorably described as 'Stravinsky meets The Barron Knights." Reflecting the band's youth, song topics included various forms of social and sexual awkwardness ("It’s Only A Party", "Aggressive Travelling"), resistance to domesticity ("Plonder On"), the frustrations of suicide methods ("Ich Bin Heidi") and the music business ("The Do's and Don'ts of Path Laying"), running away from home ("Dear Clare") and a rumination on pets and the afterlife ("Tails in the Sky").

== History ==
64 Spoons was formed by Lyndon Connah and Tam Neal, a pair of multi-instrumentalist friends who had been writing songs since the age of 10 (Tam having trained at the Royal Academy of Music). Their studies brought them into contact with Andy Crawford, a Royal College of Music flautist and classical guitar player with an interest in Early Music, but who also played bass guitar on the side. Coalescing around a line-up of Connah on drums, Crawford on bass and Neal on keyboards, 64 Spoons began playing concerts in and around their home base of Watford, Hertfordshire in 1976.

One of the band's early audience members was a teenage musician, Michael "Jakko" Jakszyk, who had been drawn to the band by "the ludicrous complexities of a fifteen-minute number called Life Is Unsaid". Despite his youth, Jakko had already fronted his own band – Soon After – which his self-confessed "dictatorial tendencies" had ultimately reduced the band to a line-up of "two screaming lead guitars and a trumpet", the latter played by former National Youth Jazz Orchestra musician Ted Emmett. Despite feeling that he was out of his musical depth, Jakko was soon installed as 64 Spoons' lead singer, guitarist and frontman, using his "insecurities and arrogance" to spur the band on. With Jakko now also contributing to the songwriting, the expanded 64 Spoons line-up produced a whole set's worth of new material. Despite this, Jakko abruptly quit 64 Spoons after the first concert with the new line-up, having chosen to join Warren Harry's punk/pop band (which had the advantage of already having a recording deal with Bronze Records). Before leaving, Jakko recommended Ted Emmett as his replacement.

However, Jakko's tenure with Warren Harry was short-lived and musically unsatisfying (he had done it mostly for the money) and by 1977, he had rejoined 64 Spoons. Retaining Emmett (on trumpet and backing vocals) and continuing as a five-piece, the band spent the next three years touring and playing around the United Kingdom in small venues, building up a reputation as an interesting cult act. With punk rock now in fashion, 64 Spoons had to work hard to "justify" their progressive-rock-styled virtuosity. Jakko would later recall that the band had "somehow survived for a number of years by working our arses off and attempting to make our musical vision more palatable. We did this by making the whole thing theatrical. Ridiculous set pieces that involved various band members dressing up, coupled with an almost Dada-esque approach to audience participation."

Live gigs were animated affairs, with the band employing any entertainment tricks they could to keep the gig going. Neal and Connah frequently swapped roles between keyboard playing and drumming. Pete Goddard of Facelift magazine remembers a show at the Palace Theatre in Watford as "one of the finest and most ludicrous shows I've ever seen", with the band making full use of the theatrical facilities, up to and including flying themselves around on stage hoists. Thanks in part to Jakko's incessant promotion, the band attracted numerous fans both in and out of the industry (including several of the band's own heroes such as Bill Bruford and Dave Stewart). However, this did not translate into success. According to Jakko, the band had "management, an agency; record company interest and we worked all the time. It just didn't go that one step further. Some kind of bad luck always seemed to befall us, just when we looked like getting our big break."

By 1980, 64 Spoons was nearing the end of its life, plagued by insecurity, internal bickering and feeling ever more at odds with British musical fashion and critical taste. The band went through several developments involving changes of presentation (via "a series of haircuts that would frighten a gibbon") and a change of name (shortened to The Spoons). There was also a change of line-up: Jakko recalls that "in another inspired piece of career based decision making, we... sacked Ted (Emmett). We felt that the trumpet was a stupid, outmoded and ultimately unfashionable instrument to have in a pop group. Ted joined The Teardrop Explodes." This was a cruel irony, as The Teardrop Explodes were, at the time, enjoying the very success which the newly rechristened Spoons were aiming for.

None of these efforts made any difference. Following a particularly disastrous gig outing to Oldham and Carlisle in May 1980, the band played a couple of final gigs and then folded for good. Jakko subsequently commented "They say that success is largely down to timing. Well, we timed it perfectly. We were the wrong band at the wrong time."

A one-off 64 Spoons live reunion was planned in the mid-1990s but never happened. However, various 64 Spoons members still keep in touch and work together. Jakko and Lyndon Connah, in particular, are frequent collaborators (predominantly on Jakko's projects).

== Recordings ==
64 Spoons released one single during their lifetime, "Ladies Don’t Have Willies". This is now a collector's item. 64 Spoons also recorded various sessions for an album. None of these were released during the band's existence, but the material was eventually compiled for a posthumous album called Landing on a Rat Column. This was ultimately released in 1992 on Freshly Cut Records, over a decade after it was recorded. (The album did not include "Ladies Don’t Have Willies", due to copyright issues as it had already appeared on a various-artists compilation album.)

== Post-Spoons ==
All of the members of 64 Spoons went on to have successful careers within the music industry.

Jakko Jakszyk has been the most prominent ex-Spoon, having maintained an intermittent solo career producing a series of original albums as well as having been King Crimson's singer and second guitarist between 2013 and 2021 and Level 42's guitar player between 1991 and 1994. As a project partner, he's played with the jazz/songwriter/Indian music project Dizrhythmia (with Danny Thompson, Gavin Harrison and Pandit Dinesh ), the Henry Cow spin-off project The Lodge (with John Greaves and Peter Blegvad) and the British progressive rock band The Tangent. He has been a collaborator with both Tom Robinson and his old hero Dave Stewart (both in Rapid Eye Movement and with the Dave Stewart & Barbara Gaskin project). Between 2002 and 2007, Jakko sang and played guitar for the 21st Century Schizoid Band, a collection of King Crimson alumni playing King Crimson music from the 1960s and 1970s (which was in turn Jakko's entry point into King Crimson). He has also sustained a long career as a session musician, including work for various musicians and bands including Swing Out Sister.

Lyndon Connah also became a session player (working with Squeeze, Thomas Dolby, Wham!, Take That, Joe Cocker, Sinéad O'Connor, David Sylvian, Tom Robinson, The Human League and Prefab Sprout among others). He spent five years as Level 42's keyboard player (2001–2006) and is currently a member of Go West. He co-led the pop band 3 Blind Mice with Alex Grayson.

Tam Neal went on to a career in theatre (including a stint as part of the backing band for The Chippendales) and is known for his original scores for plays. He frequently contributed to 3 Blind Mice (playing everything "from maracas to house brick" and piano).

Andy Crawford mostly abandoned bass guitar to concentrate on playing the baroque flute (he is a regular performer with the Gabrieli Consort and the London Handel Orchestra) and for a career as a wood craftsman. He has occasionally played bass for steel pan player/composer Rachel Hayward and has also been a member of the "Western gamelan" ensemble MetalWorks.

Ted Emmett played on The Teardrop Explodes' second album Wilder and was subsequently part of their touring band. He has also played with Joan Armatrading and has sometimes contributed to 3 Blind Mice.

== Influence on other musicians ==
In the sleevenotes to Landing on a Rat Column, Vox magazine editor Paul Colbert commented that what he still found surprising about the 64 Spoons recordings were the presence of "1990s ideas being imagined, played and recorded in the late 1970s. There are twists and turns in this plot you will recognise in present pop music, present funk, present jazz and present rock."

== Discography ==
=== Studio albums ===
- 1992: Landing on a Rat Column (Freshly Cut Records)

=== Singles ===
- 1978: "Ladies Don't Have Willies" / "Tails in the Sky" (Bushbaby Music)
