= Unitopia =

Australian band

- Origin: Adelaide, South Australia, Australia
- Genres: Progressive rock
- Years active: 1996–2014, 2021–present
- Labels: Unicorn Digital, Inside Out, ProgRock.com's Essentials
- Members: Mark Trueack; Sean Timms; John Greenwood; Steve Unruh; Chester Thompson; Alphonso Johnson; Don Schiff
- Past members: Monty Ruggiero; Shireen Khemlani; Mike Stewart; Jamies Jones; Shaun Duncan; Peter Raidel; Ian Ritchie; Matt Williams; Tim Irrgang; David Hopgood; Craig Kelly; Daniel Burgess
- Website: https://unitopiamusic.net/

Unitopia is an Australian music group using progressive rock as a framework, but also including elements of world, classical, jazz, hard rock, and groove.

Unitopia reformed in 2021 and began work on a new album. That album, Seven Chambers, was released in 2023.

== Biography ==
Unitopia began when a mutual friend introduced Trueack and Timms after realizing the two had similar musical tastes. In late 1996, the duo began work on a track which was to become "Take Good Care" and a songwriting partnership developed that led to the band's debut album More Than a Dream, which included contributions from conductor/arranger Timothy Sexton and the Adelaide Art Orchestra, Pat Schirippa, Constantine Delo, Bradley Polain and Ian 'Polly' Politis.

The album was independently launched in October 2005 to a sell out audience at The Cavern Club, Adelaide. Further live work followed in Australia, including supporting Daryl Braithwaite and playing the Norwood Food and Wine Festival. In March 2006, Canadian label Unicorn Records re-released More Than a Dream internationally.

Wishing a consistent team both live and in the studio, Trueack and Timms recruited Adelaide instrumentalists Matt Williams (guitar/vocals), Monty Ruggiero (drums), Shireen Khemlani (bass) and Tim Irrgang (percussion) to complete the Unitopia line-up. Trueack and Timms then started writing in earnest new material for their next album, The Garden. In February 2008, Unitopia signed a worldwide publishing deal with Shock Music Publishing. In July 2008, the track "Lives Go Round" from More Than a Dream was included on the CPR Volume 3 compilation CD. In August 2008, Unitopia signed a 3-album deal with InsideOut Music.

On 18 November 2008, InsideOut Music released Unitopia's second CD, The Garden, internationally, a double CD with 15 tracks and over 100 minutes of music. According to Review Busters "This double disc release is definitely one for the ages. Unitopia offers a unique blend of progressive rock with some symphonic parts that are incredible. If you never heard of this band then you will want to pick up everything they have to offer, The Garden is a non stop ride into a progressive sound that is easy on the ears, yet at the same time it offers everything you would have ever wanted from a progressive release."

Shireen Khemlani and Mike Stewart left in 2009 but the band was joined by Shaun Duncan on fretless and fretted bass, and Peter Raidel on saxophone. With this new lineup Unitopia released their third album Artificial in 2010. Jones, Duncan and Raidel were replaced, respectively, by David Hopgood, Craig Kelly and Ian Ritchie, who performed on the More Than A Garden Of Dreams tour of Europe in 2010 which included Summer's End Festival, a progressive rock festival in England.

In 2012 with Ritchie replaced by Daniel Burgess on saxophone, the band released its fourth album Covered Mirror Vol. 1: Smooth As Silk, a cover album containing interpretations of classic progressive rock tracks. The band dissolved shortly thereafter. According to Trueack, he and Timms agreed to split demos for a planned double album. Trueack, with Unitopia members Matt Williams, Tim Irrgang and David Hopgood, assembled a new band called United Progressive Fraternity (also involving Guy Manning and Steve Layton among others) and released an album titled Fall In Love with the World. The band's sound continues in the vein of Unitopia, with some notably heavier passages; Trueack's lyrics have also progressed, further exploring his concerns with environmental matters and mysticism. Timms formed a new band called Southern Empire, who released their debut album on 18 March 2016 release. Trueack has stated that he would like to work with Timms again but Timms insisted that this would never happen.

In July 2016 Timms and Trueack put their differences aside and reconnected. They are currently working on the remastering of the More than a Dream album and adding unreleased songs for an extended box set. They have also written a brand new song especially written for the set, called Dream Complete. Timms and Trueack have also put a band together called U.N.I.T. dB. This a special acoustic tour band that is made up of Southern Empire, Unitopia, Resistor, and United Progressive Fraternity. Southern Empire were playing gigs in Adelaide in February and March 2017, and touring Europe between September and October 2017. Meanwhile, Trueack is working with Steve Unruh on the next UPF albums called Loss and Hope, collaborating with artists such as Steve Hackett, Jerry Marotta, Colin Edwin, Nick Magnus, Chris Lebled, Jon Davison, Charlie Cawood, Lisa Wetton, Michelle Young, Angus Kay, George Perdikis, Hasse Froberg, Fraternity Symphonic Orchestra (60 piece) and along with some of the biggest names in the environmental space. The album will be released in Feb 2019. Trueack is also working with Chris Lebled on a chill album called The Romantic.

In 2021 the band reformed and started work on a new album titled 7 Chambers.

== Members ==
Final Line-Up

- Mark Trueack – lead vocals and Production (1996-2014, 2020–present)
- Sean Timms – keyboards, mandolin, acoustic and lap steel guitars, banjo, backing vocals (1996-2014, 2020–present)
- John Greenwood – electric and acoustic guitars, backing vocals (2020–present)
- Steve Unruh – Violin, acoustic guitars and backing vocals (2020–present)
- Chester Thompson – drums, backing vocals (2020–present)
- Alfonso Johnson – bass, backing vocals (2020–present)

Former members

- Matt Williams – electric and acoustic guitars, mandolin, backing vocals (2008-2014)
- Tim Irrgang – percussion (2008-2014)
- David Hopgood – drums, backing vocals (2010-2014)
- Craig Kelly – bass, backing vocals (2010-2014)
- Daniel Burgess – saxophone (2011-2014)
- Monty Ruggiero – drums (2008-2009)
- Shireen Khemlani – bass, backing vocals (2008-2009)
- Mike Stewart – saxophone (2008-2009; died 2014)
- Jamies Jones – bass (2009-2010)
- Shaun Duncan – drums (2009-2010)
- Peter Raidel – saxophone (2009-2010)

Former Touring Members

- Ian Ritchie – saxophone, flute, tin whistle (2010 European Tour)
- Don Schiff – NS/Stick (2023 European Tour)

== Discography ==
Studio Albums

- More Than a Dream (2005)
- The Garden (2008)
- Artificial (2010)
- Covered Mirror Vol. 1: Smooth as Silk (2012)
- Seven Chambers (2023)

Live Albums

- One Night In Europe (2011)

Singles

- "There's a Place" (2005)
- "321" (2007)
