= No More Travelling Chess =

Studio album by Parallel or 90 Degrees
- Released: October 2001
- Recorded: 2001
- Genre: Progressive rock
- Label: Cyclops
- Producer: Andy Tillison

Professional ratings
Review scores
| Source | Rating |
|---|---|
| Allmusic | link |

No More Travelling Chess is an album created by Guy Manning and Andy Tillison whilst in band Gold Frankincense & Disk-drive. The album consisted of cover versions of pieces by Peter Hammill plus a couple of original pieces. The subsequent album was released as a Cassette version on private mail order before eventually being remastered and released in an extended CD format by Cyclops Records under the band name Parallel or 90 Degrees.

== Track listing ==
Van der Graaf Generator/Peter Hammill covers

1. Arrow
2. Roncevaux
3. Flight
4. Modern
5. In The Black Room (Track added to original Cassette version)

P090/GF&DD Compositions

1. Advance (Tillison)
2. Evolutionary Status Quo (Manning)

== Personnel ==
- Andy Tillison: drums, keyboards, vocals
- Guy Manning: guitars, keyboards, vocals
