= The Slow Rust of Forgotten Machinery =

Studio album by The Tangent
- Released: July 21, 2017
- Genre: Progressive rock
- Length: 74:32 (regular edition); 79:53 (special edition)
- Label: Inside Out
- Producer: Andy Tillison

The Tangent chronology
A Spark in the Aether (2017)	The Slow Rust of Forgotten Machinery (2017)	Hotel Cantaffordit (2018)

The Slow Rust of Forgotten Machinery, subtitled Or: Where Do We Draw The Line Now?, is the ninth studio album released by progressive rock group The Tangent. The special edition of the album contains a bonus track.

== Track listing ==
All songs by Andy Tillison, except where noted.

No.	Title	Lyrics	Length
1.	"Two Rope Swings"		6:32
2.	"Dr. Livingstone (I Presume)"	Luke Machin	11:58
3.	"Slow Rust"		22:31
4.	"The Sad Story of Lead and Astatine"		16:00
5.	"A Few Steps Down the Wrong Road"		17:31
6.	"Basildonxit (Bonus Track)"	Matt Farrow	5:21
Total length:			79:53

== Personnel ==
- Andy Tillison – keyboards, vocals and drums
- Jonas Reingold – bass guitar
- Theo Travis – saxophones and flutes
- Luke Machin – guitars and vocals
- Marie-Eve de Gaultier – keyboards and vocals

with:

- Boff Whalley – vocals (5)
- Matt Farrow – DJ (6)
