= The Tangent =

Progressive rock group

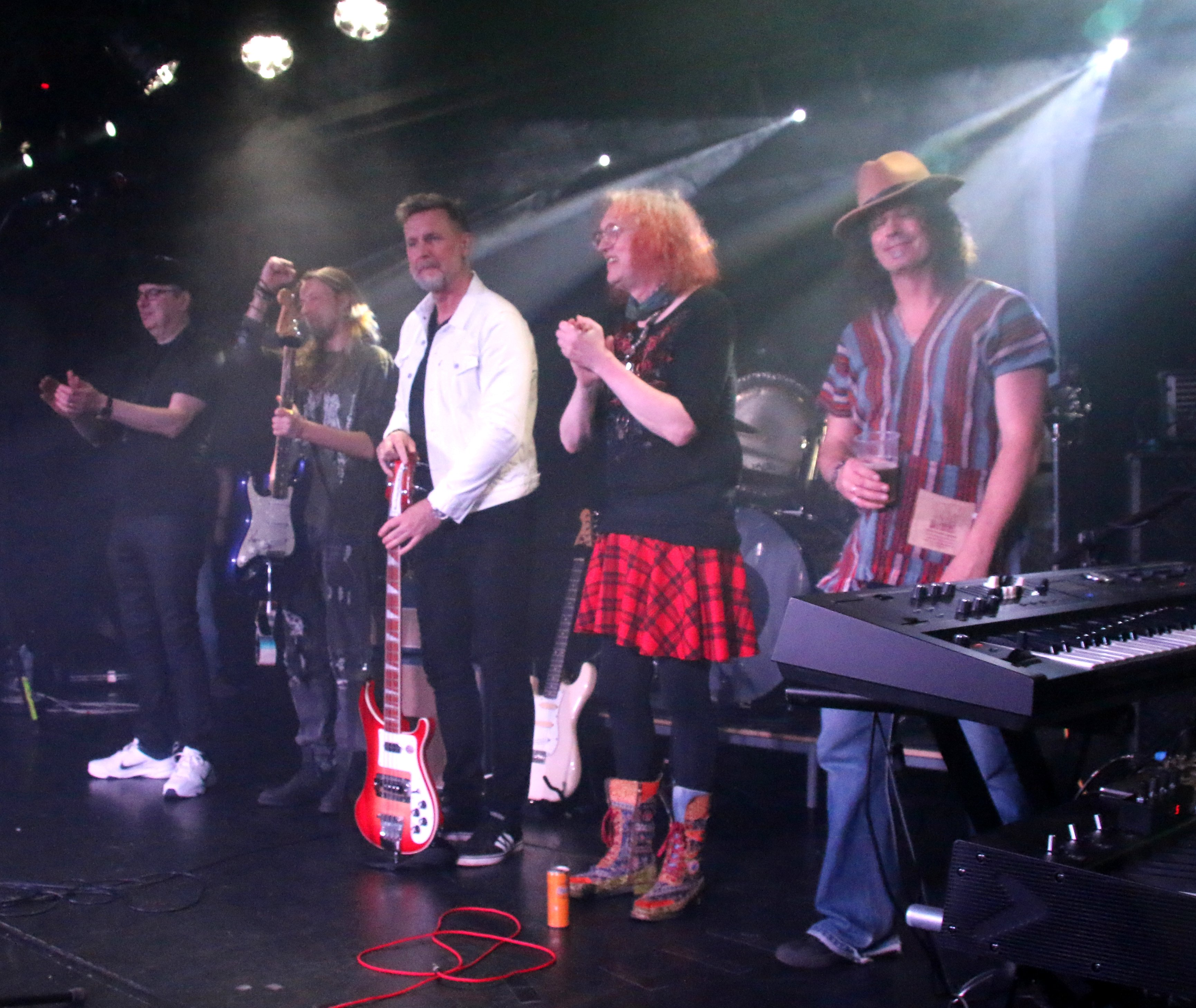
- The Tangent performing in 2023

Background information
- Genre: Progressive rock
- Years active: 2002–present
- Label: Inside Out Music
- Members: Andy Tillison
- Website: thetangent.org

The Tangent is a British progressive rock group formed in 2002, led by keyboardist and singer Andy Tillison.

== History ==
=== Formation ===
The band was formed in 2002 by Parallel or 90 Degrees keyboardists Andy Tillison and Sam Baine and multi-instrumentalist Guy Manning; The Flower Kings' guitarist Roine Stolt, bassist Jonas Reingold, and drummer Zoltan Csörsz; plus saxophonist David Jackson of Van der Graaf Generator. The band was scheduled only to be a "one-off" side project but has produced 13 studio albums and a number of live albums since.

The Tangent has had numerous changes in personnel resulting in Tillison being the only member to have been on all the recordings.

== Live performances ==
Since 2003 the band in its various forms has played concerts and festivals in the US, UK, Germany, The Netherlands, Sweden and France. Members of the band also occasionally appear as special guests on stage with other artists. On 13 February 2012 guitarist Luke Machin joined Pain of Salvation on stage at The Garage in London, England, playing on the song Kingdom of Loss. Andy Tillison also performs in a duo with Matt Stevens of The Fierce and the Dead.

== Cover art ==
The band had much of their cover art done by artist Ed Unitsky, who worked closely with the band when designing their album artwork. Ed has completed five album covers for The Tangent.

The outer cover artwork for the band’s 2020 ‘Auto Reconnaissance’ album was again provided by Unitsky while the inner sleeve art was created by newcomer Sara Mirabbasi.

Cover artwork for the album Not as Good as the Book (2008) was created by French artist Antoine Ettori, for Down and Out in Paris and London (2009) by mbl graphics.

== Personnel ==
=== Current members ===
Studio band from the latest release, Auto Reconnaissance in 2020:

- Andy Tillison (keyboards, lead vocals)
- Theo Travis (saxophone, flute, duduk)
- Luke Machin (guitar, vocals)
- John Jowitt (bass guitar)
- Steve Roberts (drums)

=== Former members ===
- Roine Stolt (guitars, vocals)
- Jakko Jakszyk (guitars, vocals)
- Göran Edman (vocals)
- Krister Jonsson (guitars)
- David Zackrisson (guitars)
- David Million (guitar)
- Dan Watts (guitar)
- Sam Baine (keyboards, piano, vocals)
- Rikard Sjöblom (keyboards, vocals)
- Lindsay Frost (keyboards)
- Lalle Larsson (keyboards)
- Marie-Eve de Gaultier (keyboards, vocals)
- Robert Hansen (bass guitar)
- Jonathan Barrett (bass guitar, vocals)
- Dan Mash (bass guitar, vocals)
- Simon Albone (bass guitar)
- Dave Albone (drums)
- Zoltan Csörsz (drums)
- Jaime Salazar (drums)
- Magnus Östgren (drums)
- Paul Burgess (drums)
- Michael Gilbourne (drums)
- Nick Rickwood (drums)
- Tony "Funkytoe" Latham (drums)
- Gavin Harrison (drums)
- Morgan Ågren (drums)
- David Jackson (saxophone, flute)
- Guy Manning (acoustic guitar, bouzouki, mandolin, keyboards, vocals)
- Julie King (vocals)
- David Longdon (vocals)
- Jonas Reingold (bass guitar, vocals)

== Discography ==
=== Studio albums ===
- The Music That Died Alone (2003)
- The World That We Drive Through (2004)
- A Place in the Queue (2006)
- Not as Good as the Book (2008)
- Down and Out in Paris and London (2009)
- COMM (2011)
- Le Sacre du Travail (2013)
- L'Etagère du Travail (2013) limited edition: material recorded for but not released on Le Sacre du Travail
- A Spark in the Aether (2015)
- The Slow Rust of Forgotten Machinery (2017)
- Proxy (2018)
- Auto Reconnaissance (2020)
- Songs from the Hard Shoulder (2022)
- To Follow Polaris (as The Tangent for One) (2024)
- Was (2026)

=== Live albums ===
- Pyramids and Stars (2005)
- Going Off on One (2007)
- Going Off on Two (2010)
- London or Paris, Berlin or Southend On Sea (2012)
- Hotel Cantaffordit (with Karmakanic as Tangekanic) (2018)

=== Compilation albums ===
- A Place on the Shelf - a special enthusiast's collection (2009)
