= Jakko Jakszyk =

British musician, record producer, and actor (born 1958)

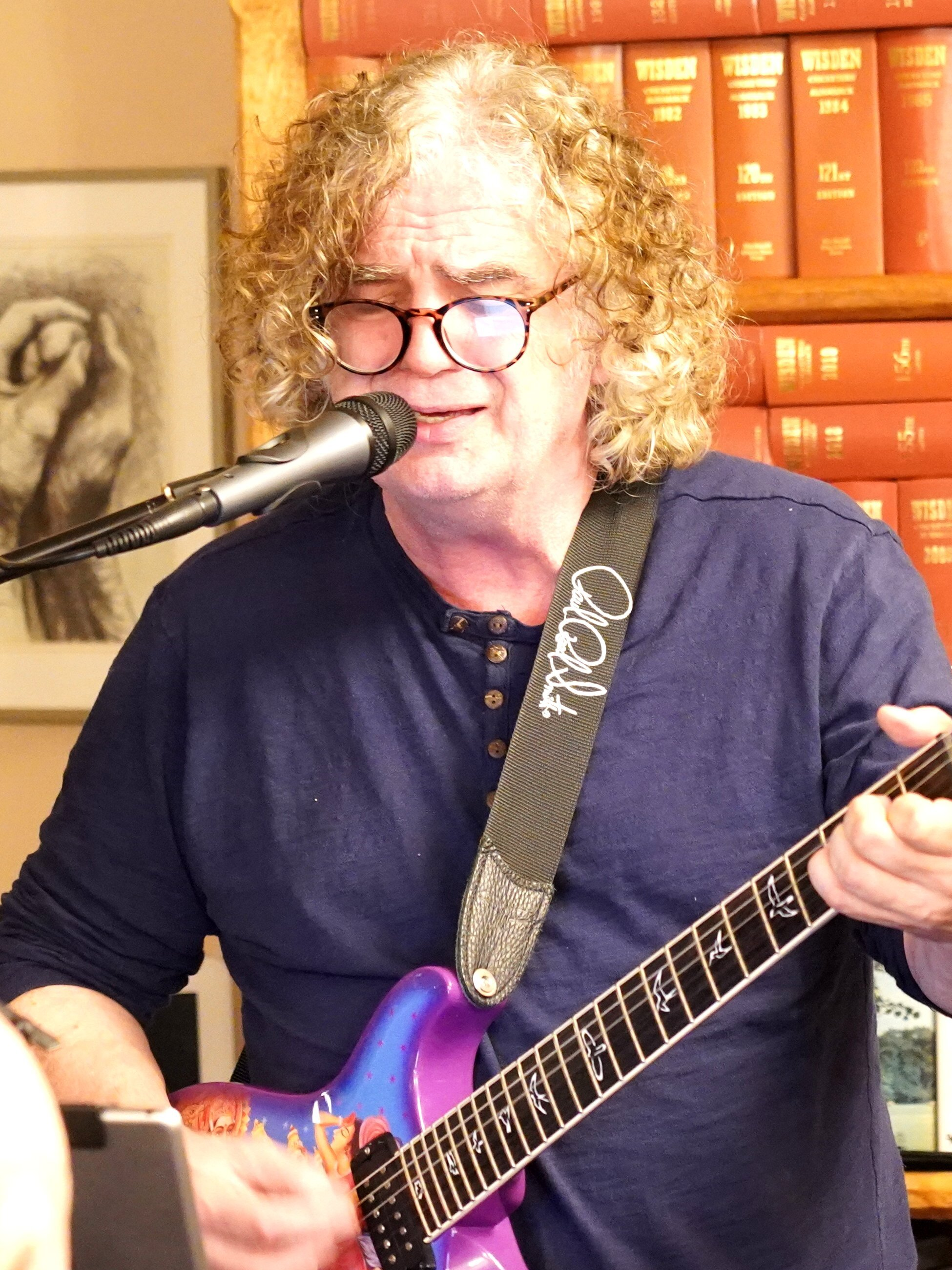
- Jakszyk in 2024

Background information
- Also known as: Jakko; Jakko M. Jakszyk
- Born: Michael Lee Curran; 8 June 1958 (age 68)
- Origin: Archway, London, England, United Kingdom
- Genres: Pop; rock; progressive rock; jazz-funk; Brit funk; jazz fusion
- Occupations: Singer-songwriter; musician; record producer; actor
- Instruments: Vocals; guitar; keyboards; flute
- Years active: 1976–present
- Labels: Chiswick; Stiff; MDM; Bam Caruso; Antilles; Island; Freshly Cut; Resurgence; Voiceprint; Ibis
- Formerly of: 64 Spoons; Level 42; 21st Century Schizoid Band; the Lodge; King Crimson

Michael "Jakko" Jakszyk (/ˈdʒæk.tʃɪk/ JAK-chik, born Michael Lee Curran, 8 June 1958) is an English musician, record producer, and actor. He has released several solo albums as a singer, songwriter, and multi-instrumentalist. He is best known as lead singer and second guitarist of King Crimson since 2013 succeeding Adrian Belew in the role. His work has been variously credited to "Jakko", "Jakko Jakszyk", and "Jakko M. Jakszyk".

Before joining King Crimson, he led bands for over thirty years, including 64 Spoons, Dizrhythmia, 21st Century Schizoid Band, Jakszyk Fripp Collins, and Rapid Eye Movement. He was a member of Level 42, the Lodge, and the Tangent and has collaborated with Tom Robinson, Peter Blegvad, Danny Thompson, Gavin Harrison, Warren Harry, Pandit Dinesh, and Dave Stewart. Jakszyk has also worked as a session musician and soundtrack producer.

== Biography ==
=== Roots and childhood (1958–1974) ===
Jakszyk was born at Whittington Hospital in Archway, London, the son of Irish singer Peggy Curran and an unknown American airman. At 18 months of age, he was adopted by two European refugees who had settled in England after World War II: Polish Norbert Jakszyk and his French wife, Camille. Jakszyk grew up in Croxley Green, Hertfordshire, and would later describe his childhood as unhappy; his adoptive parents' nationalities led to an unsettled home life. He explained, "There was a lot of confusion – English was [a] second language for both of them, so although I could understand them both, they often couldn't understand each other – it led to all sorts of daft misunderstandings and rows." Jakszyk was frequently in conflict with Norbert, although the two would reconcile later in life. In 1977, he tracked down his birth mother Peggy, who had settled in Arkansas; he and Peggy would eventually meet in 1984. Jakszyk would later reconstruct his complex family history in an extended radio piece, The Road to Ballina.

Originally aiming to become a professional footballer but, after failing to win a place with the Watford Boys football squad at the age of 15, Jakszyk switched his full attention to his other two obsessions, music and acting. As a developing musician, he was inspired equally by pop, progressive rock, and jazz fusion (with artists such as Allan Holdsworth, Henry Cow, King Crimson, and Hatfield and the North being particular favourites) and developed a high level of skill as both a guitarist and singer by his mid-teens. Having joined the National Youth Theatre at 14, he maintained his acting work in parallel to his musical efforts and would eventually gain his Equity card. In 1974, at the age of 16, he was kicked out of the Jakszyk family home by Norbert, and embarked on a struggling career as part-time actor and musician while working at a number of dead-end jobs to survive financially.

=== Early bands: Soon After, 64 Spoons, and Rapid Eye Movement (1975–1980) ===
By 1975, Jakszyk was leading an eccentric jazz-rock band called Soon After. His self-confessed "dictatorial tendencies" reduced a bigger line-up to a trio of "two screaming lead guitars and a trumpet" (the latter played by ex-National Youth Jazz Orchestra member Ted Emmett). The band reached the finals of the 1975 Melody Maker National Rock/Folk competition, finishing third. When Soon After split up, Jakszyk toured with "a strange little band" which supported Camel, Stackridge, and Judas Priest, then briefly joined a Tring-based band called Synthesis which played progressive rock in the Canterbury-scene vein.

Jakszyk's first significant band was 64 Spoons, which he joined as guitarist and lead singer in 1976, co-writing much of the band's material. Between 1976 and 1980, 64 Spoons wrote and performed a blend of pop, progressive rock, jazz, and comedy (typified by their single "Ladies Don't Have Willies"). Boosted by an exuberant and funny live show, 64 Spoons proved popular with audiences but failed to gain an effective record deal or media breakthrough and split up in 1980. Their only album, Landing on a Rat Column, was eventually released in 1992, many years after it was recorded. Jakszyk would describe them as "the wrong band at the wrong time".

64 Spoons's work did, however, lead to friendships with several of the musicians who had inspired the band, notably keyboard player Dave Stewart. Following the split of 64 Spoons, Jakszyk joined Stewart, Rick Biddulph, and Pip Pyle in the band Rapid Eye Movement. Jakszyk contributed several songs to the band's repertoire ("One More Time", "I'll Stand on My Own", "Ingmar Bergman on the Window Sill", "Straining Our Eyes", and "Dear Clare", the last of these a 64 Spoons song) and co-wrote material with Stewart ("This Is Not What I Want" and "'Allo Darlin' I Work on the Fair"). Between August 1980 and June 1981, Rapid Eye Movement toured Spain, France, and the UK and recorded material but split up due to Stewart's desire to concentrate on studio work (Jakszyk sang on the original version of Stewart's cover of "What Becomes of the Brokenhearted?", later a hit with a new vocal track by the Zombies' lead singer Colin Blunstone).

During this period, Jakszyk also contributed to sessions for the former Van der Graaf Generator saxophonist David Jackson's album The Long Hello Vol. 3 (eventually released in 1982).

=== Early solo career, Stewart/Gaskin, and the Lodge (1981–1987) ===
Signing a solo deal with Chiswick Records in 1981, Jakszyk began to record his debut solo album, Silesia, aided by Dave Stewart, David Jackson, and Amanda Parsons. During 1982, Chiswick released three singles ("The Night Has a Thousand Eyes", "Straining Our Eyes", and "Grab What You Can"), although none were hits. A full release of Silesia was shelved at the last minute while the album was at the manufacturing stage (although the album had a limited release in Germany). Strengthening his existing links to British art rock, Jakszyk began working with Peter Blegvad and would go on to play on the latter's first three solo albums (beginning with 1983's The Naked Shakespeare).

In 1983, Jakszyk signed a second solo recording contract with Stiff Records. Three further singles followed between 1983 and 1984 ("Dangerous Dreams", "I Can't Stand This Pressure", and "Who's Fooling Who") and recordings were made for a second solo album. Due for release in 1985, this album met the same fate as Silesia. It was shelved in 1985 when Stiff Records filed for bankruptcy.

It was so frustrating. The basic problem was the lack of a hit single, but there was a lot of A&R interference, which drove me mad. Nobody knew anything, but that didn't stop them showing up at the studio and asking for all sorts of pointless changes. It was particularly bad in America, where there was lots of drug-fuelled nonsense going on – executives coked out of their bonces making arbitrary decisions which they'd change the following day. Your whole career was in the hands of these people, and there was bugger-all you could do about it. (One company) employed a spirit medium. He was on the payroll – he'd even attend board meetings – and the boss insisted that all the new signings go to see him so he could predict their future.

— Jakszyk on the problems with his early solo career

Discouraged but not defeated, Jakszyk supplemented his income with acting work while continuing to pursue music. He continued his collaboration with Dave Stewart, contributing to his duo work with Barbara Gaskin and playing a prominent role on the Stewart-produced Neil's Heavy Concept Album (a 1984 spin-off from the Young Ones comedy series). During this time he also met an up-and-coming drummer named Gavin Harrison, who would become one of his most frequent collaborators. It was also during this time that he finally visited the United States to meet his birth mother.

Jakszyk's third attempt at recording a solo album, this time for MDM Records in 1986–87, was shelved when MDM's distributor, Virgin Records, dropped its support. Some of the "lost" material from this and the previously shelved albums resurfaced on Jakszyk's 1996 compilation album Are My Ears on Wrong?, while Jakszyk‘s ill-fated first album Silesia was briefly issued on CD in the late 1990s.

In 1987, Jakszyk joined Peter and Kristoffer Blegvad, John Greaves, and Anton Fier in the short-lived New York-based band the Lodge, with whom he recorded one album, The Smell of a Friend.

=== Session musician/producer, the Kings of Oblivion, and Dizrhythmia (1987–1989) ===
From 1987 onwards, Jakszyk consolidated his work as a pop session player and budding producer, and also signed a new and remunerative publishing deal. He worked with producer Larry Williams in Los Angeles, during which he wrote with, produced or played for Bill Myers, Shari Belafonte, and Tommy Funderburk's rock band What If. This period was also notable for a ludicrous footwear-related encounter with Michael Jackson and for Jakszyk's refusal to let Whitney Houston record one of his songs (either "Behave Yourself" and "Don't Blame Me", both of which were later recorded by the Nolans). Returning to the UK, he played with Swing Out Sister and Sam Brown, contributing to and co-arranging the latter's 1988 hit single "Stop", and toured with Italian singer Alice.

He formed the Kings of Oblivion with Gavin Harrison in order to record the album Big Fish Popcorn, which was released on the Bam Caruso label in 1987. The album was a pastiche project similar to XTC's the Dukes of Stratosphear that was later described as "inspiring" and "the absolute worst of Frank Zappa or Ween". Both musicians took on ridiculous pseudonyms for the project (Jakszyk as "Mario 'Fat Man' Vanzetti" and Harrison as "Helmo 'Hairdo' Hudson") and fictitious liner notes claimed that the recordings were the first and second sides of a "lost" 1967 double LP recorded in the back of an auto shop.

The Kings of Oblivion led into a more serious project when Jakszyk and Harrison teamed up with classical Indian singer/percussionist Pandit Dinesh and Danny Thompson on double bass. The quartet formed the world-fusion project Dizrhythmia, which mixed jazz, folk, art rock, and Indian classical music. Pandit Dinesh encouraged Sultan Khan to contribute to the album, while his three British colleagues brought in their own friends and colleagues from the art rock world: Dave Stewart, pedal steel guitarist B. J. Cole, and Lyndon Connah from 64 Spoons. Dizrhythmia's self-titled album was released in 1988 by Antilles Records.

=== Tom Robinson, Level 42, and the Kinks (1990–1994) ===
In 1988, Jakszyk began recording a duo album with Tom Robinson called We Never Had It So Good: it was released in 1990 and gained positive press attention. This brought Jakszyk to the attention of Jazz-funk band Level 42, who needed to replace their recently deceased guitarist Alan Murphy and Murphy's temporary substitute, Allan Holdsworth. Jakszyk's Holdsworthian guitar style, additional instrumental skills, and broad knowledge of pop music made him a natural choice.

Jakszyk went on to play on all of Level 42's tours and promotional appearances between 1991 and 1994. However, record company politics restricted his contributions: despite being pictured on the cover of 1991's Guaranteed, he never performed on a Level 42 studio album and was never a full member of the band. For similar reasons, material which he wrote and recorded with the band with the intention of release ended up shelved when Level 42 reunited with drummer and songwriter Phil Gould. Gould's second period with the band was short, and Jakszyk brought in Gavin Harrison as drummer to fulfil tour obligations. Jakszyk left Level 42 in 1994 when group leaders Mark King and Mike Lindup opted to split the band up. He would later play in one of the line-ups of King's solo bands.

During 1994, Jakszyk was very briefly a member of the Kinks. He performed with them on 1 January 1994 BBC Radio broadcast of The Johnnie Walker Show, substituting for estranged guitarist Dave Davies. The songs performed on the broadcast were "Phobia", "Over the Edge", "Wall of Fire" and "Till the End of the Day #2".

=== Solo artist, art rock journeyman, and radio documentarian (1994–1999) ===
Following Level 42's disbandment, Jakszyk joined three former members of Japan – Richard Barbieri, Mick Karn and Steve Jansen – who were considering forming another band following the disintegration of their post-Japan project Rain Tree Crow and the end of their work in the No-Man live band. The musical combination of the four players worked well and led to a lasting musical friendship, but did not result in a full-time band project. Instead, Jakszyk resumed his solo career. Signing a new record deal with the progressive/art rock label Resurgence, he released the Kingdom of Dust EP in 1994. All four of the EP tracks came from his work with Jansen, Barbieri, and Karn.

In 1995, Jakszyk released a solo album, Mustard Gas and Roses, on Resurgence, featuring a mixture of sharp, intelligent pop songs and progressive/art rock instrumentals. The album featured further contributions from Karn and Jansen, as well as from Sam Brown, BJ Cole and Jakko's Dizrhythmia colleagues Danny Thompson and Gavin Harrison. In 1996, Resurgence released a Jakszyk compilation album called Are My Ears on Wrong? – which compiled material from Jakszyk's second and third solo albums (the ones which had been shelved by Stiff and MDM during the mid -1980s).

Since 1991, Jakszyk had been sketching out plans for an autobiographical radio piece called The Road to Ballina, a mixed music-and-spoken word project exploring his own family history and his bittersweet search for his birth mother. In 1995 this went into production. In addition to Jakszyk's own account of growing up as an adoptee, the work included extensive contributions from both of his adoptive parents relating to their often harrowing wartime experience in Europe as refugees and conscripts and as people under occupation. Several of the recordings were conceptually arranged (including specially made recordings of Norbert Jakszyk recorded in Auschwitz-Birkenau) while the music tracks featured Gavin Harrison and two of Jakszyk's former Level 42 colleagues, Mark King and Gary Barnacle.

The Road to Ballina was broadcast on BBC Radio 3 in December 1996, and Resurgence released a shorter and compressed version on CD in early 1997. This was the first of Jakszyk's albums to be credited to "Jakko M. Jakszyk", and he would release all of his future solo work under that name.

In March 1999, BBC Radio 3 broadcast a second Jakszyk radio piece called The Church of Lanza, which used many of the same techniques as The Road to Ballina. The piece dealt with the nature of fame and celebrity, focussing on "the deification of stars who die young", and used the life of Mario Lanza as its focal point. The piece incurred the wrath of a number of outraged Mario Lanza fans and, unlike The Road to Ballina, was not released on album.

During this period, Jakszyk continued to work as a guest and collaborator. Between 1994 and 1999 he contributed to albums by Akiko Kobayashi (Under the Monkey Puzzle Tree), Peter Blegvad (Just Woke Up), Gavin Harrison (Sanity & Gravity), Pip Pyle (7 Year Itch), Saro Cosentino (Ones and Zeros), and Richard Barbieri (Indigo Falls).

A particularly notable Jakszyk guest effort was his contribution to Mick Karn's 1996 album The Tooth Mother. While providing guitar, keyboards and flute, he also played saxophone, shawm and the Indian bowed dilruba.

=== 21st Century Schizoid Band, The Bruised Romantic Glee Club, and the Tangent (2000–2009) ===
In 2002, Jakszyk was instrumental in the establishment of the 21st Century Schizoid Band, which specialised in performing the 1960s and 1970s repertoire of King Crimson and featured several ex-members/associates of the band – Ian McDonald, Mel Collins, Peter Giles and Michael Giles (the last later replaced by Ian Wallace). Jakszyk led the band, playing guitar and singing. Over a five-year period, the 21st Century Schizoid Band played occasional tours in the UK, North America and Japan. The band was well received by audiences, and released several live albums plus a concert DVD. Its work came to a halt in 2005 due to lack of funding and difficulties in finding worthwhile arrangements for tours: Wallace's death in 2007 finally put an end to the project.

By this point, Jakszyk had spent several years assembling another solo album, which was eventually released as The Bruised Romantic Glee Club in 2006. Hailed as his most accomplished work to date, the double album featured one disc of new Jakszyk songs and one disc of his reinterpretations of works by musicians who'd influenced him (including King Crimson, Soft Machine and Henry Cow). The album included a remarkable sweep of guest performers assembled from the full length of Jakszyk's career and associations. As well as contributions from long-standing allies Lyndon Connah, Gavin Harrison and Dave Stewart, the guests included Danny Thompson and Pandit Dinesh (from Dizrhythmia); Mark and Nathan King (from Level 42); and King Crimson members Robert Fripp, Mel Collins and Ian Wallace. Hugh Hopper (Soft Machine) and Clive Brooks (Egg) also made an appearance, playing on a Soft Machine cover version initially recorded for a compilation in 2000.

Despite some highly complimentary reviews, the original 2006 release of The Bruised Romantic Glee Club was blighted by bad luck and the collapse of the record company releasing it. Eventually, the album was re-released on the King Crimson-associated record label Panegyric in 2009 (alongside a companion album of material recorded at the same time called Waves Sweep the Sand).

In 2007, Jakszyk joined British progressive rock band the Tangent for their album Not as Good as the Book (released 2008). Following one guest appearance and one full live show at the Summers End festival in September 2008, he resigned from the band.

=== King Crimson (2010–present) ===
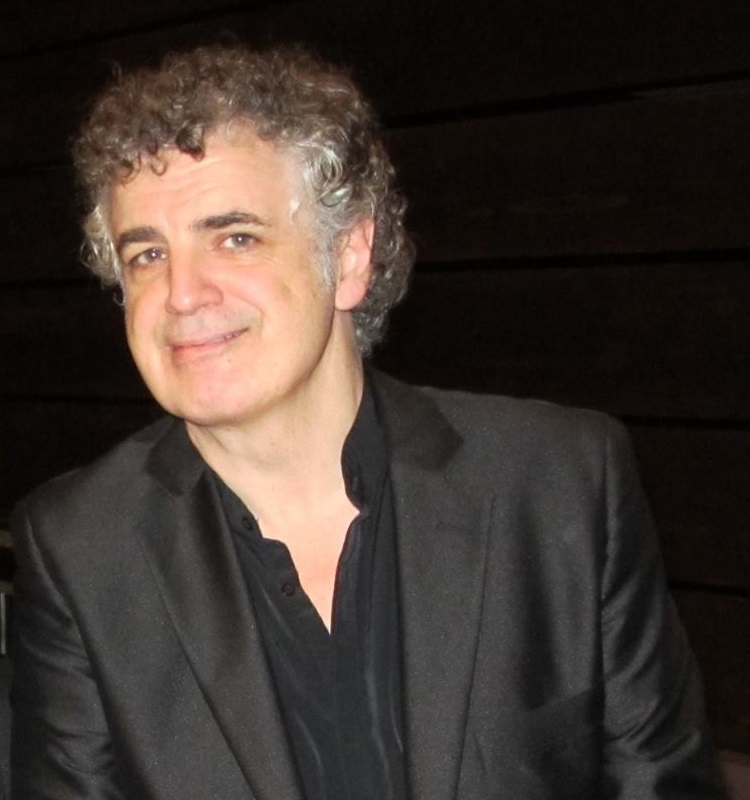
Jakszyk in 2014

Since 2002, Jakszyk's connections to the musicians in and around King Crimson had grown closer (via the 21st Century Schizoid Band, Gavin Harrison's recruitment into King Crimson in 2007, and Jakszyk's own developing friendship with Robert Fripp, which led to Jakszyk being invited to remix King Crimson's 1995 album Thrak for reissue) . In January 2010, Jakszyk and Fripp began recording ambient instrumental pieces on a casual basis: this eventually developed into a full song-based project involving Mel Collins. Gavin Harrison and King Crimson bass player Tony Levin were brought in to complete the recordings, which were released in May 2011 on the Panegyric label as an album called A Scarcity of Miracles credited to Jakszyk Fripp & Collins. At the time, King Crimson was in a "dormant" phase, but the involvement of three current band members, one former band member and a previously separate singer-songwriter in this new project led to speculation that King Crimson was about to reactivate and would recruit Jakszyk as a new frontman.

Initially Fripp downplayed these suggestions. In an online diary entry, he described the trio as an endeavour which "has the Crimson gene, but is not quite KC. It is a Crimson ProjeKct, although this was not the intention. Given the gene pool, I suppose this counts as evolution. If JFC were named as a ProjeKct, which would be legitimate IMO, then all manner of expectations, categorisations, limitations & dopey commentaries would be launched to deter the ears of innocent audients". Fripp went on to comment that the origin of the trio was in fact a proposed but abandoned ProjeKct Seven (featuring himself, Jakszyk, Collins, Levin, Harrison and possibly some other players) and described the forthcoming A Scarcity of Miracles as "one of my favouritist [sic] albums, of those where I am a determining element". A Scarcity of Miracles was met with a good critical response and a mixed welcome from the King Crimson fanbase. Due to Fripp's retirement from live performance, the release was not supported by a concert tour. Fripp's formal retirement from the music industry in 2012 stifled most of the remaining rumours.

On 24 September 2013, Fripp made the announcement that he was launching a new line-up of King Crimson, with its first tour planned for September 2014. Shortly afterwards the personnel list was announced, with Jakszyk confirmed as lead singer and second guitarist. The new King Crimson line-up continued and expanded the Scarcity of Miracles project personnel: other members besides Fripp and Jakszyk were Mel Collins, three members from the 2009 Crimson band (Gavin Harrison, Tony Levin and Pat Mastelotto) and another new recruit, American drummer/keyboard player Bill Rieflin (with a second drummer/keyboard player, Jeremy Stacey, also being added to the band in 2016). Jakko remained with King Crimson until the band's retirement in 2021 as a key part of the band's longest continual line-up.

In September Jakszyk was awarded the 'Chris Squire Virtuoso award' at the 2017 Progressive Music Awards at Shakespeare's Globe in London. It was presented to him by comedian and actor Ade Edmondson.

In 2023 and 2024 Jakszyk performed live in Italy with the new John Greaves Band along with Mel Collins, Annie Barbazza, Annie Whitehead and french drummer Régïs Boulard.

=== Secrets & Lies Album (2020) ===
On 14 August 2020 Jakszyk released an animated video for his single "The Trouble with Angels" directed by Iranian filmmaker, Sam Chegini. The song is taken from his latest album "Secrets & Lies", released on CD/DVD via InsideOut Music on 23 October 2020.

His album Son of Glen was ranked by Goldmine as one of the 11 top prog albums of 2025.

== Work in comedy and acting ==
Jakszyk has had a sideline in comedy work parallel to his solo career (ranging from radio programmes to character work on television) and has spent some time as a member of the actor's union Equity. His work as a character comedian has included playing the demented but fleet-fingered Italian guitarist Eduardo, a sidekick to comedy music duo Raw Sex (Simon Brint and Rowland Rivron). As Eduardo, Jakszyk appeared on the French & Saunders TV show in 1987, as well as being part of Raw Sex's subsequent theatre show at the Kings Head in Islington and three-week stint at the Edinburgh Fringe Festival. Jakszyk also impersonated Lindsey Buckingham in the French & Saunders TV parody of Fleetwood Mac.

In the BBC TV movie In Dreams (starring Lenny Henry and Bill Paterson), Jakszyk makes a cameo appearance as Michael Jackson's recording engineer. He has also appeared in the BBC sitcom Birds of a Feather.

Under the pseudonym of "Grand Master Jellytot", Jakszyk produced the novelty hip-hop single "The Stutter Rap" (performed by "Morris Minor and the Majors", who included future comic star Tony Hawks). This record reached Number 4 on the UK singles chart in January 1988.

In 2025, Jakszyk backed up Thomas Dolby toward the end of his US tour.

== Musical style ==
Jakszyk has followed a variety of musical approaches. He has become known – in his solo work in particular – for blending elements of pop with aspects of progressive rock. While known as a guitarist and singer, he also performs on a variety of keyboard, string and wind instruments from various cultures (and can write for even more), and his work has drawn on assorted elements of jazz, art rock, classical, Irish, Eastern European, Indian and Chinese music. His soundtrack work draws on a variety of sources as well, although he has commented that "very few (of the soundtracks) have a distinct Jakko stamp (whatever that may be)."

== Personal life ==
Jakszyk is divorced from model Amanda Giles, the daughter of King Crimson drummer and co-founder Michael Giles. They have two children who he currently lives with in Hertfordshire.

== Discography ==
=== Albums ===
Year	Performer	Title	Notes
1982	Jakko	Silesia	Chiswick (deleted prior to general release with some copies available in Europe; briefly available in 1990s as reissue; reissued as download in 2009)
1987	The Lodge	Smell of a Friend	Antilles, (reissued by Resurgence, 1997)
1987	The Kings of Oblivion	Big Fish Popcorn	Bam Caruso
1988	Dizrhythmia	Dizrhythmia	Antilles New Directions/Island (reissued by Resurgence, 1997)
1990	Tom Robinson/Jakko M. Jakszyk	We Never Had It So Good	Musidisc (later reissued with four extra tracks as Blood Brother, Castaway Northwest, 1997)
1991	64 Spoons	Landing on a Rat Column	Freshly Cut Records (recorded 1978–1980)
1994	Jakko	Mustard Gas and Roses	Resurgence
1995	Jakko	Are My Ears on Wrong?	Resurgence (compilation of tracks from two unreleased post-Silesia solo albums)
1997	Jakko M. Jakszyk	The Road to Ballina	Resurgence
2002	21st Century Schizoid Band	Official Bootleg V.1	self-released
2003	21st Century Schizoid Band	Live in Japan (CD & DVD)	Iceni
2003	21st Century Schizoid Band	Live in Italy	Arcàngelo
2006	21st Century Schizoid Band	Pictures of a City – Live in New York	Iceni
2006	Jakko M. Jakszyk	The Bruised Romantic Glee Club	Iceni, ICNCD (reissued on Panegyric, 2009)
2008	The Tangent	Not as Good as the Book	Inside Out Music
2009	Jakko M. Jakszyk	Waves Sweep the Sand	self-released
2011	Jakszyk, Fripp & Collins	A Scarcity of Miracles – A King Crimson ProjeKct	Panegyric
2014	King Crimson	The Elements of King Crimson 2014 Box	DGM
2015	King Crimson	Live at the Orpheum	DGM
2015	King Crimson	The Elements of King Crimson 2015 Box	DGM
2016	King Crimson	Live in Toronto November 2015	DGM
2016	King Crimson	Radical Action to Unseat the Hold of Monkey Mind	DGM
2016	King Crimson	The Elements of King Crimson 2016 Box	DGM
2016	Dizrhythmia	Dizrhythmia Too	Dizzy Rhythm
2017	King Crimson	The Elements of King Crimson 2017 Box	DGM
2017	King Crimson	Live in Chicago	DGM
2018	King Crimson	Live in Vienna	DGM
2018	King Crimson	The Elements of King Crimson 2018 Box	DGM
2018	King Crimson	Audio Diary 2014-2017	DGM
2018	King Crimson	Meltdown: Live in Mexico City	DGM
2019	King Crimson	KC50	DGM
2019	King Crimson	The Elements of King Crimson 2019 Box	DGM
2019	King Crimson	Audio Diary 2014-2018	DGM
2020	Jakko M. Jakszyk	Secrets & Lies	InsideOut Music
2025	Jakko M. Jakszyk	Son of Glen	InsideOut Music

=== Singles and EPs ===
Year	Performer	Title	Album
1982	Jakko	"The Night Has a Thousand Eyes" / "Something Tells Me" (with David Jackson)	Silesia
1982	Jakko	"Straining Our Eyes" / "Fall to Pieces" (with David Jackson)	Silesia
1982	Jakko	"Grab What You Can (Biez Co Mozesz)" / "Tell Me" / "Would I Be the Same" / "I'd Never Have Known" (with David Jackson) "Grab What You Can" / "I'd Never Have Known" (Chiswick)	Silesia
1983	Jakko	"Dangerous Dreams" / "Opening Doors" (with David Jackson, Stiff)	Are My Ears on Wrong?
1984	Jakko	"I Can't Stand This Pressure" / "Living on the Edge" (with David Jackson) "I Can't Stand This Pressure" / "Living on the Edge" / "Cover Up" (with David Jackson)	Are My Ears on Wrong?
1984	Jakko	"Who's Fooling Who" / "A Grown Man Immersed in Tin-Tin" (with David Jackson, Stiff)	
1986	Jakko	"Judy Get Down" / "This Old Man"	Are My Ears on Wrong?
1986	Jakko	"Learning to Cry"	Mustard Gas and Roses
1990	Tom Robinson/Jakko M. Jakszyk	"Blood Brother"	We Never Had It So Good
1994	Jakko M. Jakszyk	Kingdom of Dust	
2006	Jakko M. Jakszyk	"Highgate Hill"	The Bruised Romantic Glee Club
2011	Jakszyk, Fripp, and Collins	"A Scarcity of Miracles (Radio Edit)"	A Scarcity of Miracles
2015	King Crimson	Cyclops	
2017	King Crimson	Heroes	
2018	King Crimson	Uncertain Times	
2020	Jakko M. Jakszkyk	"The Trouble with Angels"	Secrets & Lies
2020	Jakko M. Jakszkyk	"It Would All Make Sense"	Secrets & Lies
2020	Jakko M. Jakszkyk	"Uncertain Times"	Secrets & Lies

=== As guest or sideman ===
- David Jackson: The Long Hello Vol. 3 (Butt Records, 1982) – guitars, bass guitar, synthesizer, vocals
- Peter Blegvad: The Naked Shakespeare (Virgin, 1983 – guitar
- Neil: Neil's Heavy Concept Album (WEA, 1984)
- Peter Blegvad: Knights Like These (Virgin, 1985) – guitar
- What If: What If (RCA, 1987) – guitar
- Swing Out Sister: It's Better to Travel (Mercury, 1987) – guitar
- Peter Blegvad: Downtime (Virgin, 1988) – guitar, backing vocals
- Sam Brown: Stop! (Mercury, 1988) – guitar
- John Greaves, David Cunningham: Greaves, Cunningham (Eva Records, 1991) (reissued on Piano 1997) – vocals
- Mica Paris: Whisper a Prayer (4th & Broadway, 1993) – guitar
- Holi (Akiko Kobayashi): Under the Monkey Puzzle Tree (Resurgence, 1994) – guitar, flute, backing vocals
- Peter Blegvad with John Greaves and Chris Cutler: Just Woke Up (ReR Megacorp, 1995) – guitars
- Mick Karn: The Tooth Mother (CMP, 1996) – guitars, shawm, dilruba, flute, tenor saxophone, keyboards, programming, sampler
- Indigo Falls: Indigo Falls (Medium Productions, 1997) – guitars and low whistle
- Saro Cosentino: Ones and Zeros (Consorzio Produttori Indipendenti/Mercury/Resurgence, 1997) – vocals
- Gavin Harrison: Sanity and Gravity (Resurgence, 1997) – keyboards, guitar, vocals, whistle
- Pip Pyle: 7 Year Itch (Voiceprint, 1998) – guitar, flute, production, lead vocals on three tracks
- Mark King: Mark King Group Live ... At The Jazz Café (Mark King Self-released, 1999) – guitar, backing vocals
- Steven Wilson: The Raven That Refused to Sing (And Other Stories) (Kscope, 2013) – vocals on "Luminol" and "The Watchmaker"
- Fjieri: "Words Are All We Have" (Emerald, 2015) – lead and backing vocals on 9 tracks, guitar
- Steve Hackett: "Genesis Revisited" (Inside Out Music, 2012) – lead vocals on "Entangled", guitar
- Level 42 : Live at London's Town and Country Club – Recorded in 1992 – (DVD, Wienerworld, 2013) – Guitar and backing vocals
- Louise Patricia Crane: "Deep Blue" (Peculiar Doll Records, 2020) – Guitar and backing vocals

=== Album remixes ===
Year	Band	Title
2014	Emerson, Lake & Palmer	Brain Salad Surgery (Deluxe Edition)
2015	Emerson, Lake & Palmer	Trilogy (Deluxe Edition)
2015	Jethro Tull	Minstrel in the Gallery (40th Anniversary La Grande Edition), Live at The Palais Des Sports, Paris, 5 July 1975
2015	King Crimson	Thrak (40th Anniversary Edition) & THRAK BOX
2018	Chris Squire	Fish Out of Water (Deluxe Edition)
2018	Jethro Tull	Heavy Horses (40th Anniversary New Shoes Edition), Live in Concert in Berne, Switzerland, May 1978

== TV and video ==
- Jo Brand's "Through the Cakehole"
- Chef (BBC – music for all series)
- Hard Cases (Central TV)
- Clive James's Postcard from... Bombay
- In Dreams (BBC TV movie)
- Birds of a Feather (BBC – music for one season and a Christmas special)
- CD-ROM games World War II and The War in the Pacific.
