= The Bruised Romantic Glee Club =

Studio album by Jakko M. Jakszyk
- Released: 2006
- Genre: Jazz-rock; progressive rock
- Length: 87:29
- Producer: Jakko M. Jakszyk

The Bruised Romantic Glee Club is the fifth solo album by English musician Jakko M. Jakszyk. it was his first release in 9 years since 1997s The Road to Ballina and first since the breakup of the 21st Century Schizoid Band, a band featuring former members of early lineups of the progressive rock band King Crimson. Jakszyk was the only member who previously hadn't been a member of the band though he did join the band when they reformed in 2013. Due to Jakszyk's membership of the Schizoid band, the album features members of the band.

== Overview ==
The Bruised Romantic Glee Club is a double album in which the first disc ("Now") consists of original songs by Jakszyk and the second disc ("Then") consists of cover versions of progressive rock/art rock songs (by artists including Soft Machine, King Crimson and Henry Cow) which served as influences on Jakszyk in his youth. Originally envisaged as "largely instrumental with a couple of songs thrown in," the writing and production of the album was subsequently interrupted by significant events in Jakszyk's life including the deaths of his adoptive parents and the ending of a relationship, meaning that he ended up exploring "some uncomfortable corners of the past" through song.

The album also features members of various prog rock and jazz rock bands from the 1970s until the present day, including Mark King, Nathan King, Gary Barnacle and Lyndon Connah of Level 42; Dave Stewart and Clive Brooks of Egg and Gavin Harrison and Suzanne Barbieri (Richard Barbieri's wife) of Porcupine Tree. The album also features contributions from King Crimson leader and guitarist Robert Fripp.

The Bruised Romantic Glee Club features a composition that had previously been performed by the 21st Century Schizoid Band on their 2003 and 2004 tours. Called Catley's Ashes, and instrumental composition that's recorded version features contributions Mel Collins of alto and tenor saxophones, Mark King on bass guitar and Gavin Harrison on drums, as well as Jakszyk on electric guitar and keyboards.

== Critical responses ==
In AllMusic, Dave Lynch observes that the album "well demonstrates Jakszyk's prog skills and makes it easy to hear why Robert Fripp would subsequently invite him to step into the KC vocalist role... But also consider that 2006's ...Bruised... is a bit of a, well, schizoid listening experience... As a result, the heartfelt original songs on the first disc stand at a fairly wide distance from the covers of '60s and '70s art rock classics on the rather short (35-plus-minute) second disc, vintage numbers from Crimson, Soft Machine, and Henry Cow performed with help from such cult figures as Dave Stewart, Hugh Hopper, Mel Collins, and Ian Wallace... For those listeners eager to hear updated versions of prog, avant-prog, and art rock numbers from decades ago, the second disc is likely to hit the CD player first... The first disc is not without its pleasures that would have fit nicely on the second, particularly the instrumental "Catley's Ashes," with its intricate arrangement of saxes and guitars over a cruising 7/8 rhythm... Ultimately, Henry Cow's "The Citizen King" and Jakszyk's "When We Go Home" really are from different musical universes. Nevertheless, while The Bruised Romantic Glee Club has a case of split-personality disorder, it's a fine showcase for the future King Crimson singer/guitarist (along with his stellar collaborators), and nicely set the stage for his higher-profile work to follow."

Reviewing The Bruised Romantic Glee Club in All About Jazz, critic John Kelman praised Jakszyk's "virtuosic" playing and commented on the album's "largely autobiographical songs whose complexity and diverse instrumentation place them firmly in the progressive camp, but with a refreshing pop sensibility and utter lack of pretension. Jakszyk's voice conveys deeply felt emotions without resorting to extravagance or melodrama. The arrangements are detailed, but not at the expense of a melodism that reflects Jakszyk's longstanding interest and occasional participation in the Canterbury scene... Despite its bevy of guests, Jakszyk's multilayered multi-instrumentalism keeps The Bruised Romantic Glee Club firmly focused. That we're the sum total of our experiences is a given, but by blending his own work with interpretations of seminal influences, Jakszyk demonstrates how he has reached where he is today, in the clearest of terms."

In Sea of Tranquillity, reviewer Kerry Leimer concluded that "the goal seems to be one of playing with a number of different forms - not unlike the rock to jazz to "classical" compositional palette of King Crimson - and finding a way to reconcile all and everyone with an overriding concern for good, solid music. And he comes pretty close to accomplishing this, but with a much softer edge than the influences of King Crimson might imply. While the title admits to a "romantic" orientation, things tend at times to get downright sentimental in both form and content... This double package represents an enormous amount of effort, especially given its intimate tone. Though it is at times uneven and perhaps overly sentimental it is equally expert in its performance. After all, Jakszyk is clearly working in a highly personal, even private way. The fact that so much space is given to that which so influenced him is an especially generous gesture and acknowledgment of all that comes before. What lacks is what some artists excel at - being both critical and more willing to self-edit. Still, given the strength of this outing, it's safe to assume that Jakszyk will develop that discipline as well."

In Musoscribe, Bill Kopp observed "while The Bruised Romantic Glee Club possesses a definite and unmistakable air of progressive rock, it’s firmly rooted in a pop sensibility, making it the sort of record that a prog fan can enjoy with his wife or girlfriend (but not both, of course). Things rarely stay rooted in the good old 4/4 on the set, but there’s enough repetition of unusual time signatures to give them something approaching toe-tapping vibe. Jakszyk seems intent on delivering up a wide array of styles within his chosen idiom: “When Peggy Came Home” sounds like a Gilmour-era Pink Floyd track, complete with soaring lead guitar, sustained keyboard pads and “found” voices. The Floyd style crops up again on “Srebrenica,” (see what I mean about weighty topics?) a track on which Jakszyk does everything. Jakszyk's voice naturally occupies a space close to that of Greg Lake, lending a warm and vaguely familiar feeling to songs; this is the case even when listeners are hearing them for the first time. The subject matter on The Bruised Romantic Glee Club is somber, serious and weighty; the songs concentrate on traumatic and jarring events in Jakszyk's life. The titles tell the story: “No One Left to Lie To,” “The Things We Throw Away.” Yet the heavy lyrical content is delivered with catchy, melodic (generally) midtempo music that sweetens it just enough to go down easy... An overall atmospheric endeavor, The Bruised Romantic Glee Club is a rewarding listen for those who enjoy expertly played and arranged midtempo songs deeply imbued with melancholy and lightly tinged with progressive elements."

In a review of the album for Contact Music, Mike Rea added "prog rock isn't just something The Mars Volta cited as a reference. The genre has never truly gone away, and on this double CD, Jakszyk stays spot in the centre of the bullseye. With an amazing collection of guests, such as saxophonist Mel Collins, guitarist Robert Fripp, and Dave Stewart, this has '70s supergroup written all over it... Prog's still very much alive in the old hands."

== Track listing ==
Disc 1

All tracks are written by Jakko Jakszyk (except noted).

| No. | Title | Writer(s) | Length |
|---|---|---|---|
| 1. | "The Bruised Romantic Glee Club" | | 7:34 |
| 2. | "Variations on a Theme by Holst" | | 1:16 |
| 3. | "Catley's Ashes" | | 6:15 |
| 4. | "When Peggy Came Home" | | 2:01 |
| 5. | "Highgate Hill" | | 6:23 |
| 6. | "Forgiving" | Jakko M. Jakszyk, Robert Fripp | 5:06 |
| 7. | "No One Left to Lie To" | | 4:56 |
| 8. | "The Things We Throw Away" | Lyndon Connah | 4:14 |
| 9. | "Doxy, Dali and Duchamp" | | 4:55 |
| 10. | "Srebrenica" | | 3:38 |
| 11. | "When We Go Home" | | 5:51 |
| Total length: | | | 52:09 |

Disc 2

| No. | Title | Writer(s) | Original artist | Length |
|---|---|---|---|---|
| 1. | "As Long As He Lies Perfectly Still" | Mike Ratledge, Robert Wyatt | Soft Machine | 3:03 |
| 2. | "That Still And Perfect Summer" | Jakko M. Jakszyk | | 0:56 |
| 3. | "Astral Projection In Pinner" | Dave Stewart | | 0:59 |
| 4. | "Pictures Of An Indian City" | Robert Fripp (music), Peter Sinfield (lyrics) | King Crimson | 8:08 |
| 5. | "Nirvana For Mice" | Fred Frith | Henry Cow | 4:31 |
| 6. | "Islands" | Robert Fripp (music), Peter Sinfield (lyrics) | King Crimson | 9:29 |
| 7. | "The Citizen King" | Tim Hodgkinson | Henry Cow | 6:26 |
| 8. | "Soon After" | Jakko M. Jakszyk | | 1:48 |
| Total length: | | | | 35:20 |

== Personnel ==
Per discogs

Musicians

- Jakko M. Jakszyk – vocals (1.1, 1.5–1.7, 1.9, 1.11, 2.1, 2.4, 2.6, 2.7), electric guitar (1.1, 1.2 1.5, 1.6, 2.5, 2.6, 2.7), acoustic guitar (1.1, 1.5, 1.8, 1.11, 2.5, 2.6), guitar (1.4, 1.7, 1.9, 1.10, 2.1), balalaika (1.1), bass guitar (1.1, 2.8), keyboards (1.1, 1.3, 1.4, 1.5, 1.6, 1.7, 1.10, 1.11, 2.4, 2.7, 2.8), additional keyboards (1.9, 2.5, 2.6), Mellotron 2.1), sitar guitar 2.4), programming (1.1, 1.5, 1.7, 1.10, 1.11, 2.4), fake bass clarinet (1.2), fake choir (1.4), Irish low whistle (1.4, 1.10), flute 2.7), strings (1.8), percussion (1.5, 1.10), stylophone (2.8)
- Robert Fripp – guitar & soundscapes (1.6, 1.11)
- Lyndon Connah – piano (1.8)
- Dave Stewart – piano (1.9, 2.1, 2.6), organ (2.1), arrangements (2.1), keyboards & programming (2.5, 2.7), harmonium & bassoon (2.6)
- Mel Collins – tenor & alto saxophone (1.1, 1.3, 1.7), flute (1.1), soprano saxophone (2.4, 2.6), bass flute (2.6)
- Ian McDonald – flute (1.2)
- Gary Barnacle – flutes & saxophone (2.1)
- Helen Kamminga – viola (1.2)
- Caroline Lavelle – cello (1.2)
- Mark King – bass (1.3)
- Nathan King – bass (1.5)
- John Giblin – acoustic & fretless basses (1.6)
- Danny Thompson – double bass (1.9, 2.6)
- Hugh Hopper – bass (2.1)
- Gavin Harrison – drums (1.1, 1.3, 1.5–1.7, 1.9, 2.4, 2.5, 2.7)
- Clive Brooks – drums (2.1)
- Ian Wallace – drums (2.6)
- Pandit Dinesh – tabla & vocals (2.4)
- Chris Baker – voice actor (1.4)
- Camille Jakszyk – voice actor (1.11)
- Django Jakszyk – voice actor (1.11)
- Suzanne Barbieri – backing vocals (1.11)

Production

- Jakko M. Jakszyk – production
- Gavin Harrison – drums engineering (1.1, 1.3, 1.5, 1.6, 1.9) drums recording (1.1, 1.3, 1.5, 1.6, 1.9, 2.4, 2.5, 2.7), bass engineering (1.9), bass recording (1.9, 2.6)
- Gerard Saunders – woodwind engineering (1.1, 1.3), woodwind recording (1.1, 1.3, 2.4)
- Ben Findley – strings engineering and recording
- Ben Darlow – additional engineering (1.3, 1.8, 2.6), final mix (1.5), piano recording and engineering (1.9)
- David Singleton – Robert Fripp guitars recording (1.6, 1.11)
- Chris Porter – woodwinds recording (1.7, 2.6)
- Lyndon Connah – piano recording (1.8)
- Simon Elmes – voice recording (1.11)
- Gary Barnacle – Horns and woodwind engineering (2.1)
- Ian Wallace – drums recording (2.6)
- Tom Kelly – grand piano recording (2.6)
