= Andy Tillison =

British keyboardist and singer (born 1959)

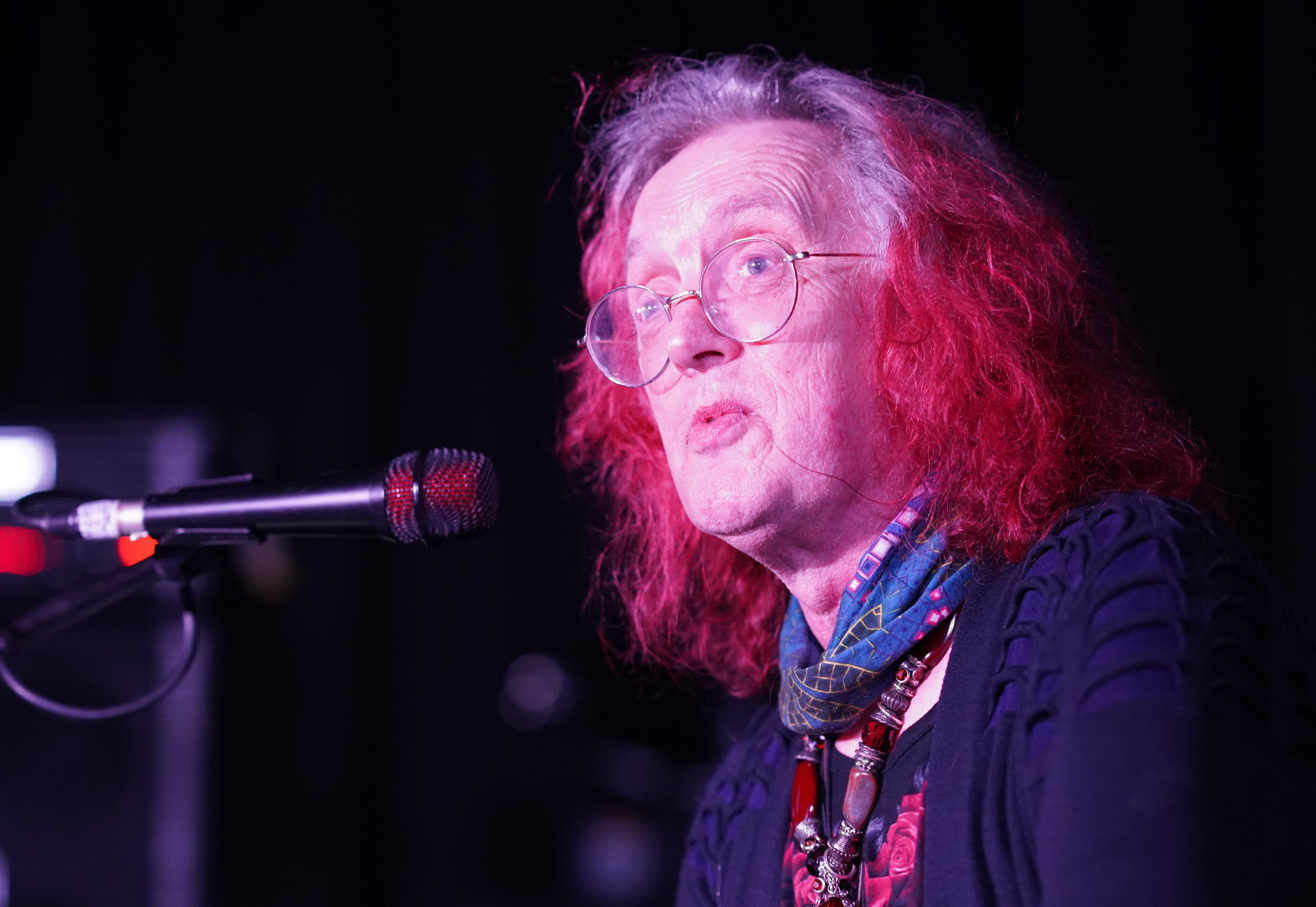
Tillison performing with The Tangent in 2023.

Andy Tillison (born 21 June 1959) is a British keyboardist and singer best known for his work in the progressive rock bands Parallel or 90 Degrees and The Tangent.

== Biography ==
Tillison and guitarist/vocalist Guy Manning had an early unsigned band called Gold Frankincense & Disk Drive. The band's final line-up also included Hugh Banton on organ and Dave Albone on drums. One piece by this line-up, "A Gap in the Night", was later included on Parallel or 90 Degrees' The Corner of My Room, followed by the archival release No More Travelling Chess.

Tillison and Manning then formed a new band, Parallel or 90 Degrees, with Sam Baine also on keyboards. With Manning temporarily unavailable, Tillison and Baine recorded The Corner of My Room, subsequently released as the band's second album.

A new line-up of Parallel or 90 Degrees signed with Cyclops Records with Tillison, Baine, Lee Duncan (drums), Jonathan Barrett (bass) and Graham Young (guitar). Young was later replaced by Gareth Harwood. The band released Afterlifecycle (1997) and The Time Capsule. With Alex King on drums and Ken Senior on bass, the band then released Unbranded. Harwood was replaced by Dan Watts for More Exotic Ways to Die. Following a break to work on other projects, 2009 saw PO90 return with the album "Jitters". King and Watts are currently working on a band called British Fiction.

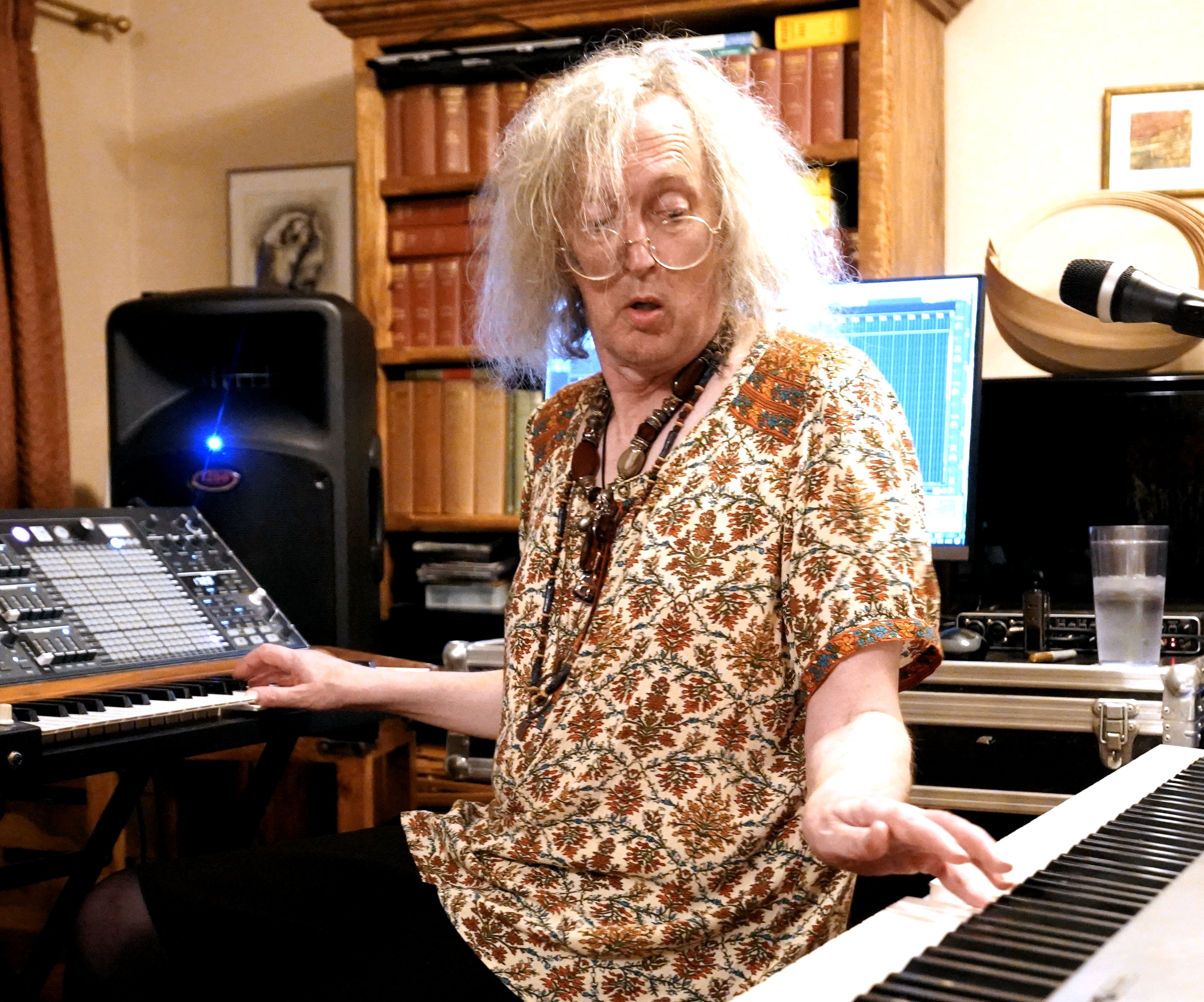
Tillison performing solo in 2022

Meanwhile, plans for a solo album by Tillison transformed into the first The Tangent release, The Music That Died Alone (2003). The line-up included Roine Stolt, Jonas Reingold and Zoltan Csorsz from The Flower Kings, David Jackson from Van der Graaf Generator and Guy Manning. See main article on The Tangent.

Andy Tillison also performs in a duo with Matt Stevens of The Fierce and the Dead.
