= Roine Stolt discography =

This is the complete discography of musician Roine Stolt.

== Studio albums ==
=== With Kaipa ===
- Kaipa (1975)
- Inget Nytt Under Solen (1976)
- Solo (1978)
- Notes from the Past (2002)
- Keyholder (2003)
- Mindrevolutions (2005)

=== Solo albums ===
- Fantasia (1979) (as Roine Stolt's Fantasia)
- Fantasia (1982) (as the band Fantasia)
- Behind the Walls (1985)
- The Lonely Heartbeat (1989)
- Utopia (1990) (EP)
- The Flower King (1994)
- Hydrophonia (1998)
- Wallstreet Voodoo (2005)
- Manifesto of an Alchemist (2018) (as Roine Stolt's the Flower King)

=== With The Flower Kings ===
- Back in the World of Adventures (1995)
- Retropolis (1996)
- Stardust We Are (1997)
- Scanning the Greenhouse (1998)
- Flower Power (1999)
- Alive on Planet Earth (2000)
- Space Revolver (2000)
- The Rainmaker (2001)
- Unfold the Future (2002)
- Meet the Flower Kings (2003)
- Adam & Eve (2004)
- Paradox Hotel (2006)
- Instant Delivery (2006)
- The Sum of No Evil (2007)
- The Road Back Home (2007)
- Tour Kaputt (2011)
- Banks of Eden (2012)
- Desolation Rose (2013)
- Waiting for Miracles (2019)
- Islands (2020)
- By Royal Decree (2022)
- Look at You Now (2023)
- Live in Europe 2023 (2024)
- Love (2025)

=== With Transatlantic ===
- SMPT:e (2000)
- Live in America (2001)
- Bridge Across Forever (2001)
- SMPTe: The Roine Stolt Mixes (2003)
- Live in Europe (2003)
- The Transatlantic Demos (2003)
- The Whirlwind (2009)
- Whirld Tour 2010: Live in London (2010)
- More Never Is Enough: Live In Manchester & Tilburg 2010 (2010)
- Kaleidoscope (2014)
- KaLIVEoscope (2014)
- The Absolute Universe (2021)
- The Final Flight: Live at L'Olympia (2023)
- Live at Morsefest 2022: The Absolute Whirlwind (2024)

=== With Kaipa Da Capo ===
- Dårskapens monotoni (2016)
- Live (2017)

=== With Bollenberg Experience ===
- If Only Stones Could Speak (2002)

=== With The Tangent ===
- The Music That Died Alone (2003)
- The World That We Drive Through (2004)
- Pyramids and Stars (2005)

=== With Karmakanic ===
- Entering the Spectra (2002)
- Wheel of Life (2004)
- Who's the Boss in the Factory (2008)

=== With Circus Brimstone ===
- BrimStoned in Europe (2005)

=== With Agents of Mercy ===
- The Fading Ghosts of Twilight (2009)
- Dramarama (2010)
- The Black Forest (2011)

=== With 3rd World Electric ===
- Kilimanjaro Secret Brew (2009)

=== With Jon Anderson ===
- Invention of Knowledge (2016)

=== With The Sea Within ===
- The Sea Within (2018)

=== With Supernal Endgame ===
- Touch the Sky – Volume I (2010)

== Other albums ==
=== With The Flower Kings ===
- Édition Limitée Québec (1998)
- Fan Club 2000 (2000)
- Live in New York – Official Bootleg (2002)
- Fan Club 2002 (2002)
- BetchaWannaDanceStoopid!!! (2004)
- Fan Club 2004 (2004)
- Fan Club 2005 / Harvest (2005)
- Carpe Diem – The Flower Kings Live in USA (2008)

=== Selected guest appearances ===
- Neal Morse – ? (2005)
- Steve Hackett – Genesis Revisited II (2012)
- The Prog World Orchestra – A Proggy Christmas (2012)
- Charlie Faege & Tricky Dogs – Long Away and Far Ago (2016) Charlie Faege & Tricky Dogs
- The Prog Collective – Songs We Were Taught (2022) Bandcamp
- Jonas Lindberg & The Other Side — Miles from Nowhere (2022)
