= The Road Back Home (The Flower Kings album) =

Compilation album by The Flower Kings
- Released: 26 June 2007
- Recorded: December 2006 – January 2007
- Genre: Progressive rock
- Length: 153:48
- Label: InsideOut Music
- Producer: Roine Stolt

The Flower Kings chronology
Instant Delivery (2006)	The Road Back Home (2007)	The Sum of No Evil (2007)

Professional ratings
Review scores
Source	Rating
Allmusic	3.5/5 stars

The Road Back Home is the second compilation album by the Swedish progressive rock band The Flower Kings. It is a double album with some of the group's shorter and more straightforward songs, rather than their usual long/complex epic songs. All of the songs have been remastered and most have been remixed. Some have even been reworked, with new guitar solos, or new lead vocals, or different backing vocals, etc.

Roine Stolt personally made all the remakes, between December 2006 and January 2007, and gives comments for each track in the album's booklet. The album includes a previously unreleased track from The Rainmaker sessions and a cover version of Genesis' famous song "The Cinema Show".

== Track listing ==
All songs by Roine Stolt except where noted.

=== Disc One ===
All tracks are written by Roine Stolt, except where noted.

No.	Title	Writer(s)	Original release	Length
1.	"My Cosmic Lover"		Back in the World of Adventures (1995)	6:14
2.	"A Kings Prayer"		Space Revolver (2000)	5:34
3.	"Stupid Girl"		Flower Power (1999)	4:41
4.	"Cosmic Circus"		Adam & Eve (2004)	3:12
5.	"Babylon"	Tomas Bodin	Adam & Eve (2004)	2:00
6.	"Paradox Hotel"	Bodin, Stolt	Paradox Hotel (2006)	5:40
7.	"World Without a Heart"		The Rainmaker (2001)	3:50
8.	"Church of Your Heart"		Stardust We Are (1997)	6:11
9.	"Vox Humana"		Unfold the Future (2002)	4:21
10.	"What If God Is Alone"		Paradox Hotel (2006)	6:42
11.	"Starlight Man"		Adam & Eve (2004)	3:28
12.	"Grand Old World"		Unfold the Future (2002)	5:02
13.	"The Road Back Home"		Retropolis (1996)	8:52
14.	"The Cinema Show" (Genesis cover; faded out at 7:02 on initial release, this is the full version.)	Tony Banks, Phil Collins, Peter Gabriel, Steve Hackett, Mike Rutherford	A Tribute to Genesis – The Fox Lies Down (1998)	11:56
Total length:				77:43

=== Disc Two ===
All tracks are written by Roine Stolt, except where noted.

No.	Title	Writer(s)	Original release	Length
1.	"Ghost of the Red Cloud"		Stardust We Are (1997)	4:41
2.	"Painter"		Flower Power (1999)	6:48
3.	"I Am the Sun, Part 2" (excerpt)		Space Revolver (2000)	4:22
4.	"Different People"		Stardust We Are (1997)	5:14
5.	"Little Deceiver"		outtake from The Rainmaker (2001)	3:56
6.	"Chicken Farmer Song"		Space Revolver (2000)	5:06
7.	"Rhythm of the Sea"		Retropolis (1996)	4:40
8.	"Touch My Heaven"	Bodin	Paradox Hotel (2006)	5:45
9.	"Life Will Kill You"	Hasse Fröberg	Paradox Hotel (2006)	6:36
10.	"Monkey Business"		Unfold the Future (2002)	4:21
11.	"Compassion"		Stardust We Are (1997)	4:44
12.	"The Flower King" (1998 re-recorded version)		Scanning the Greenhouse (1998)	10:54
13.	"Stardust We Are, Part 3" (1998 re-recorded version)		Scanning the Greenhouse (1998)	8:41
Total length:				75:48

== Personnel ==
The Flower Kings

- Roine Stolt: lead and backing vocals, guitars, keyboards, percussion (all); bass guitar (Space Revolver, "Paradox Hotel")
- Tomas Bodin: keyboards (all); backing vocal ("Touch My Heaven")
- Hasse Fröberg: lead and backing vocals, guitars (all, except "My Cosmic Lover", "The Road Back Home", "Rhythm of the Sea")
- Michael Stolt: bass guitar (1995–1999); vocal ("My Cosmic Lover")
- Jaime Salazar: drums, percussion (1995–2001)
- Jonas Reingold: bass guitar, vocals (2000–2006)
- Zoltan Csörsz: drums (2002–2004)
- Daniel Gildenlöw: vocals (2002)
- Marcus Liliequist: drums, vocals (2006)

Guests

- Ulf Wallander: soprano and tenor saxophones (1995–1997, 2000–2002)
- Hasse Bruniusson: percussion, voices (1996–2004)
- Håkan Almkvist: sitar, tabla (1997)
