= Adam & Eve (The Flower Kings album) =

Studio album by The Flower Kings
- Released: August 3, 2004
- Recorded: 2004
- Genre: Progressive rock
- Length: 78:43
- Label: InsideOut Music
- Producer: Roine Stolt

The Flower Kings chronology
Meet the Flower Kings (2003)	Adam & Eve (2004)	Paradox Hotel (2006)

Professional ratings
Review scores
Source	Rating
Scream Magazine	5/6 stars

Adam & Eve is the eighth studio album by the Swedish progressive rock band The Flower Kings. A Japanese edition contained an extra disc which includes the bonus tracks from The Rainmaker bonus disc (the first six tracks), as well as three songs recorded during the Space Revolver sessions.

The album has the only appearance of Pain of Salvation's Daniel Gildenlöw as a full-time band member; he appeared on both Unfold the Future and Meet the Flower Kings as a guest. It is also the last album with the drummer Zoltan Csörsz before his first departure (he later appeared on The Sum of No Evil).

== Track listing ==
All tracks are written by Roine Stolt, except where noted.

No.	Title	Writer(s)	Length
1.	"Love Supreme"		19:50
2.	"Cosmic Circus"		3:00
3.	"Babylon" (instrumental)	Tomas Bodin	2:41
4.	"A Vampire's View"		8:50
5.	"Days Gone By" (instrumental)	Bodin	1:10
6.	"Adam & Eve"		7:50
7.	"Starlight Man"		3:30
8.	"Timelines"	Jonas Reingold, Stolt	7:40
9.	"Driver's Seat"		18:22
10.	"The Blade of Cain"		5:00

Bonus disc (Japanese edition)
No.	Title	Length
1.	"Excerpt from Valkyrian"	3:14
2.	"Mr. Hope Goes to Salzburg"	0:50
3.	"One Whole Half"	5:16
4.	"Agent Supreme"	2:32
5.	"Violent Brat"	4:31
6.	"The Woman with No Shadow"	2:13
7.	"She Carved Me a Wooden Heart"	5:48
8.	"Space Revolver"	7:25
9.	"Jupiter Backwards"	6:20

== Personnel ==
- Tomas Bodin – keyboards
- Hasse Bruniusson – percussion
- Zoltan Csörsz – drums
- Hasse Fröberg – vocals, guitars
- Daniel Gildenlöw – vocals
- Jonas Reingold – bass guitar
- Roine Stolt – vocals, guitars, keyboards
