= Scanning the Greenhouse =

Scanning The Greenhouse

Compilation album by The Flower Kings
- Released: June 23, 1998
- Recorded: 1994–1998
- Genre: Progressive rock
- Length: 73:20
- Label: Outer Music, Avalon Records
- Producer: Roine Stolt, Don Azzaro

The Flower Kings chronology
| Stardust We Are (1997) | Scanning The Greenhouse (1998) | Flower Power (1999) |

Professional ratings
Review scores
| Source | Rating |
|---|---|
| Allmusic | 4/5 stars |

Scanning The Greenhouse is the first compilation album by the Swedish progressive rock band The Flower Kings.

This album contains songs from their first four studio albums (including Roine Stolt's solo album The Flower King) and focuses on long tracks, almost all of them with more than ten minutes. It was released when the band was visiting the United States for the first time.

The album was released in Japan through Avalon Records with a cover version of the Genesis song "The Cinema Show", the band's original contribution to the Genesis tribute album The Fox Lies Down, in place of the song "Compassion".

== Track listing ==
All songs by Roine Stolt except where noted.

| No. | Title | Writer(s) | Length |
|---|---|---|---|
| 1. | "In the Eyes of the World" | | 10:38 |
| 2. | "World of Adventures" | | 13:37 |
| 3. | "Pipes of Peace" | Tomas Bodin, Stolt | 1:19 |
| 4. | "The Flower King" | | 11:40 |
| 5. | "There Is More to This World" | | 10:15 |
| 6. | "Stardust We Are, Part 3 (1998 re-recorded version)" | | 9:56 |
| 7. | "Retropolis" | | 11:10 |
| 8. | "Compassion" | | 4:45 |

== Personnel ==
- Roine Stolt – vocals, guitars, bass guitar, keyboards, percussion
- Tomas Bodin – keyboards, vocals
- Hasse Fröberg – vocals, guitars
- Michael Stolt – bass guitar, vocals
- Jaime Salazar – drums
- Hasse Bruniusson – drums, percussion

Production

- Lilian Forsberg – photography
- Dexter Frank Jr. – engineer
- David Palermo – artwork
