= Carpe Diem – The Flower Kings Live in USA =

Carpe Diem

Live album by The Flower Kings
- Released: 2008
- Recorded: October 16, 2006
- Genre: Progressive rock
- Length: 67:56
- Label: Foxtrot Records
- Producer: Roine Stolt

The Flower Kings chronology
The Sum of No Evil (2007)	Carpe Diem (2008)	Tour Kaputt (2011)

Carpe Diem — The Flower Kings Live in USA is an official bootleg by the Swedish progressive rock band The Flower Kings. It is The Flower Kings' performance at Whittier in California on October 16, 2006, plus a bonus track from their show at Quebec City.

It was released through Roine Stolt's own label, Foxtrot Records.

== Track listing ==
All songs by Roine Stolt except where noted.

No.	Title	Writer(s)	Length
1.	"Paradox Hotel"	Tomas Bodin, Stolt	7:40
2.	"Psychedelic Postcard"		10:45
3.	"Hudson River Sirens Call 1998"		5:55
4.	"Fish Soup (drum and bass solo)"	Marcus Liliequist, Jonas Reingold	7:12
5.	"Pioneers of Aviation"		4:01
6.	"Just This Once"		13:40
7.	"World of Adventures"		8:50
8.	"A Vampire's View (Quebec City bonus track)"		9:53

== Personnel ==
- Roine Stolt – vocals, guitars
- Tomas Bodin – keyboards
- Hasse Fröberg – vocals, guitars
- Jonas Reingold – bass guitar, vocals
- Marcus Liliequist – drums
