= Opus Atlantica (album) =

Studio album by Opus Atlantica
- Released: 7 January 2003
- Genre: Power metal
- Length: 35:49
- Label: Regain Records

Opus Atlantica is the debut full-length album by the Swedish power metal band Opus Atlantica. It was released on 7 January 2003 by Regain Records.

== Track listing ==
1. "Line of Fire" – 3:58
2. "Judas Call" – 4:39
3. "Holy Graal" – 4:15
4. "Prince of Darkness" – 4:23
5. "Anthem" – 3:48
6. "Falling Angel" – 3:30
7. "Endless Slaughter" – 3:26
8. "Sleep with the Devil " – 4:02
9. "Edge of the World" – 3:44
10. "Upside Down (bonus track)" – 4:11

== Credits ==
- Pete Sandberg – vocals
- Johan Reinholdz – guitars
- Jonas Reingold – bass, keyboards
- Jaime Salazar – drums
- Robert Engstrand - keyboards
