= Islands (The Flower Kings album) =

Studio album by the Flower Kings
- Released: 30 October 2020
- Genre: Progressive rock
- Length: 95:51
- Label: Inside Out Music

The Flower Kings chronology
Waiting for Miracles (2019)	Islands (2020)	By Royal Decree (2022)

Islands is the fourteenth studio album by the progressive rock band the Flower Kings, released in 2020 through Inside Out Music.

== Track listing ==
Islands track listing
No.	Title	Length
1.	"Racing with Blinders On"	4:33
2.	"From the Ground"	4:10
3.	"Black Swan"	5:57
4.	"Morning News"	4:06
5.	"Broken"	6:48
6.	"Goodbye Outrage"	2:24
7.	"Journeyman"	1:49
8.	"Tangerine"	4:12
9.	"Solaris"	9:31
10.	"Heart of the Valley"	4:41
11.	"Man in a Two Piece Suit"	3:28
12.	"All I Need Is Love"	5:53
13.	"A New Species"	5:56
14.	"Northern Lights"	5:45
15.	"Hidden Angles"	0:52
16.	"Serpentine"	3:52
17.	"Looking for Answers"	4:47
18.	"Telescope"	4:52
19.	"Fool's Gold"	3:18
20.	"Between Hope & Fear"	4:42
21.	"Islands"	4:15
Total length:		95:51

== Personnel ==
The Flower Kings

- Roine Stolt – vocals, electric guitar, acoustic guitar, ukulele, keyboards
- Hasse Fröberg – vocals, acoustic guitar
- Jonas Reingold – bass, acoustic bass
- Mirko DeMaio – drums, tambourine, shaker, congas, bells, percussion
- Zach Kamins – piano, organ, synthesizer (MiniMoog), synthesizer, Mellotron, orchestrations

Guest musicians

- Rob Townsend – soprano saxophone

Additional credits

- Roger Dean – artwork
- Thomas Ewerhard – design
- Lilian Forsberg – photography
- Roine Stolt – mixing, mastering

== Charts ==
Chart performance for Islands
Chart (2020)	Peak position
Belgian Albums (Ultratop Wallonia)	109
German Albums (Offizielle Top 100)	48
Swiss Albums (Schweizer Hitparade)	92
