= Who's the Boss in the Factory? =

Studio album by Karmakanic
- Released: 18 November 2008
- Genre: Symphonic rock, neo-prog
- Length: 55:28
- Label: Inside Out
- Producer: Jonas Reingold

Karmakanic chronology
Wheel of Life (2004)	Who's the Boss in the Factory? (2008)	In a Perfect World (2011)

Professional ratings
Review scores
Source	Rating
AllMusic	3.5/5 stars

Who's the Boss in the Factory? is the third studio album by Swedish symphonic rock band Karmakanic. It was released through Inside Out Music on 18 November 2008.

== Track listing ==
All songs written by Jonas Reingold and Inger Ohlén Reingold, except where noted.

No.	Title	Lyrics	Length
1.	"Send a Message from the Heart"		19:28
2.	"Let in Hollywood"	Jonas Reingold	4:53
3.	"Who's the Boss in the Factory"		13:04
4.	"Two Blocks from the Edge"		9:51
5.	"Eternally Part I"		1:51
6.	"Eternally Part II"		6:21

== Personnel ==
=== Karmakanic ===
- Göran Edman – vocals
- Krister Jonsson – electric and acoustic guitars, keyboards, additional bass
- Lalle Larsson – keyboards
- Jonas Reingold – electric and fretless bass, additional keyboards
- Zoltan Csorsz – drums, percussion

=== Additional musicians ===
- Tomas Bodin – keyboards
- Johan Glössner, Krister Jonsson and Elias Kalvik – guitars
- Lelo Nika – accordion
- Rob Palmen – vocals
- Roine Stolt – twelve-string guitar, organ and percussion
- Andy Tillison – organ and synthesizer
- Theo Travis – saxophone

=== Production ===
- Produced By Jonas Reingold
- Recorded and engineered by Tomas Bodin, Jonas Reingold and Roine Stolt
- Mixed by Magnus Axelsson and Jonas Reingold
- Mastered by Magnus Axelsson
