= Waiting for Miracles =

Studio album by the Flower Kings
- Released: 8 November 2019
- Studio: RMV, Stockholm
- Genre: Progressive rock
- Length: 84:32
- Label: Inside Out Music; Sony Music

The Flower Kings chronology
Desolation Rose (2013)	Waiting for Miracles (2019)	Islands (2020)

Waiting for Miracles is the thirteenth studio album by the progressive rock band the Flower Kings, released on 2019.

== Track listing ==
Waiting for Miracles track listing
No.	Title	Writer(s)	Length
1.	"House of Cards"	Kamins	1:57
2.	"Black Flag"	Stolt	7:39
3.	"Miracles for America"	Stolt	9:56
4.	"Vertigo"	Stolt	9:59
5.	"The Bridge"	Stolt	5:32
6.	"Ascending to the Stars"	Kamins	5:40
7.	"Wicked Old Symphony"	Stolt	5:46
8.	"The Rebel Circus"	DeMaio, Stolt	5:49
9.	"Sleep with the Enemy"	Stolt	6:01
10.	"The Crowning of Greed"	Stolt	4:49
11.	"House of Cards Reprise"	Kamins	1:21
12.	"Spirals"	Reingold, DeMaio, Stolt, Kamins	5:06
13.	"Steampunk"	Stolt	6:30
14.	"We Were Always Here"	Stolt	7:35
15.	"Busking at Brobank"	Stolt	0:52
Total length:			84:32

== Personnel ==
The Flower Kings

- Roine Stolt – electric, 12-string (2, 13) and acoustic (5, 7, 9, 14, 15) guitars, keyboards, sequencer (4), Taurus Moog (8), strings and pipe organ (9), Mellotron and ukulele (10, 12), synth (14), lead vocals (3), co-producer
- Hasse Fröberg – lead vocals, backing vocals
- Jonas Reingold – acoustic (5), fretless (4) and electric basses
- Mirko DeMaio – drums, percussion, vibes (3), timpani (3, 6)
- Zach Kamins – Hammond, Mellotron, Minimoog, synths, Rhodes, piano, Wurlitzer (7), Yamaha GX-1 organ (8), glockenspiel and marimba (10, 12), guitar and orchestration (6), theremin and harmonium (15)

Guest musicians

- Michael Stolt – bass and Taurus Moog (1, 2, 7), backing vocals (3)
- Bradley Dujmovic – strings engineer
- John "Zach" Dellinger – viola (6)
- Paul Cartwright – violin (6)

Additional credits

- Kevin Sloan – artwork
- Carsten Drescher – layout
- Lilian Forsberg – photography
- KR – lacquer cut

== Charts ==
Chart performance for Waiting for Miracles
Chart (2019)	Peak position
Belgian Albums (Ultratop Wallonia)	84
German Albums (Offizielle Top 100)	59
Swiss Albums (Schweizer Hitparade)	67
