= Love (The Flower Kings album) =

Studio album by The Flower Kings
- Released: 2 May 2025
- Genre: Progressive rock
- Length: 70:49
- Label: Inside Out
- Producer: Roine Stolt

The Flower Kings chronology
Look at You Now (2023)	Love (2025)	Hope (2026)

Love is the seventeenth studio album by Swedish progressive rock band The Flower Kings. It was released on 2 May 2025, by Inside Out Music. The album features twelve songs with a total runtime of approximately seventy minutes.

== Reception ==
Professional ratings
Review scores
Source	Rating
Prog	4/5 stars
Spill	4.5/5 stars

Prog rated the album four stars and described it as "an album of fully realised ambition, even if the music occasionally moors too close to their British forebears." Spill assigned it a rating of four and a half out of five and stated, "With their new album, Love they have come up with a prog rock classic."

It was ranked by Goldmine as one of the 11 top prog albums of 2025.

== Track listing ==
All tracks are written by Roine Stolt, except ”World Spinning” (Lalle Larsson) and "Considerations" (lyrics written by Michael Stolt and Jannica Lund, music composed by Michael Stolt).

Love track listing
No.	Title	Length
1.	"We Claim the Moon"	6:34
2.	"The Elder"	11:09
3.	"How Can You Leave Us Now!?"	5:52
4.	"World Spinning"	2:04
5.	"Burning Both Edges"	7:43
6.	"The Rubble"	4:17
7.	"Kaiser Razor"	2:26
8.	"The Phoenix"	3:35
9.	"The Promise"	3:56
10.	"Love Is"	6:02
11.	"Walls of Shame"	6:57
12.	"Considerations"	10:14
Total length:		70:49

== Personnel ==
Credits adapted from Tidal.

=== The Flower Kings ===
- Mirko DeMaio – drums, percussion
- Hasse Fröberg – lead vocals, guitar
- Lalle Larsson – keyboards, Mellotron, organ, piano, synthesizer
- Michael Stolt – bass guitar, guitar, synthesizer, vocals
- Roine Stolt – lead vocals, guitar, keyboards, percussion, production, mastering, mixing, engineering

=== Additional contributors ===
- Lars Hallbäck – engineering
- Jannica Lund – vocals on "We Claim the Moon"
- Hasse Bruniusson – percussion on "Kaiser Razor"
- Aliaksandr Yasinski – accordion on "The Promise"
