= By Royal Decree =

Studio album by the Flower Kings
- Released: 4 March 2022
- Genre: Progressive rock
- Length: 93:57
- Labels: Inside Out Music, Sony Music

The Flower Kings chronology
Islands (2020)	By Royal Decree (2022)	Look at You Now (2023)

By Royal Decree is the fifteenth studio album by the progressive rock band the Flower Kings, released on 4 March 2022.

== Track listing ==
By Royal Decree track listing
No.	Title	Length
1.	"The Great Pretender"	6:58
2.	"World Gone Crazy"	5:06
3.	"Blinded"	7:52
4.	"A Million Stars"	7:19
5.	"The Soldier"	5:26
6.	"The Darkness in You"	5:17
7.	"We Can Make It Work"	2:52
8.	"Peacock on Parade"	5:22
9.	"Revolution"	6:02
10.	"Time the Great Healer"	6:16
11.	"Letter"	2:26
12.	"Evolution"	4:50
13.	"Silent Ways"	5:03
14.	"Moth"	4:41
15.	"The Big Funk"	4:43
16.	"Open Your Heart"	5:19
17.	"Shrine"	1:11
18.	"Funeral Pyres"	7:14
Total length:		93:57

== Personnel ==
The Flower Kings

- Roine Stolt – guitars (all tracks except 17), vocals (lead on 4-7, 14), additional keyboards (1), Clavinet (18), orchestration (14)
- Hasse Fröberg – vocals (lead on 1, 2, 13), 12-string acoustic guitar (4)
- Jonas Reingold – fretted bass, fretless bass (1, 3, 5, 7-8, 11-14, 16)
- Michael Stolt – bass, Moog Taurus pedalboard, backing vocals (2, 4-6, 10, 15)
- Mirko DeMaio – drums, percussion, additional orchestration (18)
- Zach Kamins – organ, piano, synthesizers, orchestrations

Guest musicians

- Aliaksandr Yasinski – accordion (11)
- Jannica Lund – backing vocals (2, 4-7, 10, 13, 15-16, 18)
- Jonas Lindberg – bass (9)
- Rob Townsend – saxophones (3)
- Hasse Bruniusson - acoustic and electronic percussion (2, 11)

Additional credits

- Kevin Sloan – artwork
- Lasse Hallbäck – engineer
- Thomas Ewerhard – layout
- Roine Stolt – mixing
- Lilian Forsberg, Patrick Marek – photography

== Charts ==
Chart performance for By Royal Decree
Chart (2022)	Peak position
Belgian Albums (Ultratop Flanders)	185
Belgian Albums (Ultratop Wallonia)	84
Dutch Albums (Album Top 100)	53
German Albums (Offizielle Top 100)	17
Swiss Albums (Schweizer Hitparade)	23
