= Wallstreet Voodoo =

Studio album by Roine Stolt
- Released: November 11, 2005
- Recorded: between January & September 2005 at Cosmic Lodge Studio, Uppsala, Sweden.
- Genre: Progressive blues
- Length: 115:10
- Label: InsideOut
- Producer: Roine Stolt

Roine Stolt chronology
Hydrophonia (1998)	Wallstreet Voodoo (2005)

Wallstreet Voodoo is a blues album made by Roine Stolt (The Flower Kings, Transatlantic, The Tangent, Kaipa, Fantasia). The album was released November 11, 2005.

== Track listing ==
All words & music by Roine Stolt except "Sex Kills" by Joni Mitchell.

=== Disc one ===
1. "The Observer" – 11:05
2. "Head Above Water" – 5:25
3. "Dirt" – 8:15
4. "Everyone Wants to Rule the World" – 4:05
5. "Spirit of the Rebel" – 6:10
6. "Unforgiven" – 3:00
7. "Dog with a Million Bones" – 8:10
8. "Sex Kills" (Joni Mitchell) – 7:20
9. "Outcast" – 7:50

=== Disc two ===
1. "The Unwanted" – 9:00
2. "Remember" – 6:55
3. "It's All About Money" – 8:05
4. "Everybody Is Trying to Sell You Something" – 6:55
5. "Hotrod (The Atomic Wrestler)" – 9:10
6. "Mercy" – 2:40
7. "People That Have the Power to Shape the Future" – 11:05

Sources: and

== Personnel ==
- Roine Stolt – lead vocal, electric guitars, acoustic guitars, percussion
- Neal Morse – Lead & background vocals on "Head Above Water", "Everyone Wants To Rule The World" & "Remember", background vocals on "The Observer" & "It's All About Money", Hammond Organ solo on "Head Above Water"
- Slim Pothead (pseudonym) – Wurlitzer piano, Minimoog, Hammond organ
- Victor Woof (pseudonym) – Fender bass
- Marcus Liliequist – drums
- Hasse Bruniusson – percussion
- Gonzo Geffen (pseudonym) – congas, percussion, loop treatments

Production

- Thomas Ewerhard – cover art and layout
- Roine Stolt – mixing and mastering

Sources: and
