= Alive on Planet Earth =

Live album by The Flower Kings
- Released: 15 February 2000
- Recorded: September 1998, March 1999
- Genre: Progressive rock
- Length: 114:54
- Label: Century Media
- Producer: Don Azzaro

The Flower Kings chronology
Flower Power (1999)	Alive on Planet Earth (2000)	Space Revolver (2000)

Professional ratings
Review scores
Source	Rating
Allmusic	3/5 stars

Alive on Planet Earth is the first live album by the progressive rock band The Flower Kings. It was released in double-CD format in 2000.

== Track listing ==
All songs by Roine Stolt except where noted.

=== Disc One ===
No.	Title	Writer(s)	Length
1.	"There Is More to This World"		11:31
2.	"Church of Your Heart"		9:41
3.	"The Judas Kiss"		15:43
4.	"Nothing New Under the Sun"		4:13
5.	"The Lamb Lies Down on Broadway" (Genesis cover)"	Tony Banks, Phil Collins, Peter Gabriel, Steve Hackett, Mike Rutherford	9:17

=== Disc Two ===
No.	Title	Writer(s)	Length
1.	"Big Puzzle"		18:28
2.	"The Sounds Of Violence"		6:38
3.	"Three Stories"	Tomas Bodin	6:05
4.	"In The Eyes Of The World"		12:07
5.	"The Flower King"		11:26
6.	"Stardust We Are, Pt. 3"		9:45

Disc one was recorded at ProgDay in Chapel Hill, North Carolina, USA, on 6 September 1998, and at D'Auteuil in Quebec City, Canada, on 11–12 September 1998, with Robert Engstrand on keyboards.
Disc two was recorded at On Air West in Tokyo, Japan, on 15–16 March 1999, and Club Quatro, Osaka, Japan, on 18 March 1999, with Tomas Bodin on keyboards.

== Personnel ==
- Tomas Bodin (Disc 2) – keyboards
- Robert Engstrand (Disc 1) – keyboards
- Hasse Fröberg – acoustic guitar, electric guitar, slide guitar, vocals
- Jaime Salazar – drums, snare drums, percussion, vocals
- Michael Stolt – bass guitar, synthesizer bass, vocals
- Roine Stolt – guitar, photography, vocals

Production

- Don Bridges – photography
- Florent Cuaz – photography
- Stephen Geysens – engineer
- Noriya Maekawa – engineer
- David Palermo – artwork
- Atsushi Sofuni – photography
