= Opus Atlantica =

- Origin: Sweden
- Genres: Power metal, Progressive metal
- Years active: 2001–present
- Labels: Regain Records
- Members: Pete Sandberg; Johan Reinholdz; Jonas Reingold; Jaime Salazar; Robert Engstrand

Opus Atlantica is a Swedish power metal band. It is a project of Pete Sandberg a prominent Swedish singer, who has participated in the creation of at least 20 full-length albums. Additionally, Jonas Reingold, a notable Swedish bassist who has also been involved with such bands as Time Requiem and The Flower Kings, is also a band member. The band claims influences from heavy metal, opera and traditional hard rock, resulting in its neo-classical sound.

== Line-up ==
- Pete Sandberg – vocals
- Johan Reinholdz – guitars
- Jonas Reingold –.bass, keyboards
- Jaime Salazar – drums
- Robert Engstrand – keyboards

== Discography ==
- Opus Atlantica (2002)
