= Zoltán Csörsz =

- Born: 4 July 1976 (age 50); Miskolc, Hungary
- Genres: Progressive rock; jazz; jazz fusion
- Occupation: Musician
- Instrument: Drums
- Years active: 1986–present
- Formerly of: The Flower Kings; Latin Flavor; The Family Tree; Tragedy; Bentzon Brothers; Karmakanic; The Tangent; Jan Lundgren Trio; The Minstrel's Ghost; Lifesigns
- Website: Zoltán Csörsz on Myspace

Zoltán Csörsz (born 4 July 1976) is a Hungarian drummer who is most well known as a former drummer of the Flower Kings and Lifesigns.

== Biography ==
Zoltan Csörsz was born on 4 July 1976 in Miskolc, Hungary. He began playing drums at age five, and won an international talent contest in Hungary at age nine. Csörsz went on to win numerous other awards in Hungary, and eventually moved on to formal music training in Hungary and eventually the Jazz Institute in Malmö, Sweden, where he played in a variety of different bands. In May 2001 when the Flower Kings' drummer, Jaime Salazar, left the band, keyboardist Tomas Bodin suggested Csörsz because he was impressed by the drummer's skill, as he had played with him in previous projects as well as seeing him in various bands around Sweden. Csörsz stayed with The Flower Kings before leaving the band in 2005. He then rejoined the band in 2007 to record their tenth album, The Sum of No Evil. He currently is in his own band, The Zoltan Csörsz Trio.

In 2011, Csörsz played drums on the Kee Marcello album Redux: Europe.

In 2012 Zoltan teamed up with Blake Carpenter (The Minstrel's Ghost), Marco Chiappini (Gandalf's Project), Troy James Martin (LeeAnne Savage) and Colin Tench (Corvus Stone and Bunchakeze) to record the album The Road To Avalon due out late 2012. This is Zoltan's first progressive rock album in many years and has already been touted as one of the best albums of the year.

Among the artists he has toured with are LaGaylia Frazier and Jan Lundgren, with whom, alongside Mattias Svensson (bass), Zoltan is a member of the Jan Lundgren Trio.

On June 12, 2020, Zoltan was announced as the new drummer in Lifesigns, replacing Frosty Beedle.

== Discography ==
=== With The Flower Kings ===
- Unfold the Future (2002)
- Meet the Flower Kings (2003)
- Adam & Eve (2004)
- The Sum of No Evil (2007)
- "Live in New York - Official Bootleg" (2003)

=== With Richard Andersson's Space Odyssey ===
- "Embrace the Galaxy" (2003)

=== With The Jan Lundgren Trio ===
- * European Standards (2008)
- I Love Jan Lundgren Trio (2013)
- Flowers of Sendai (2014)

=== With The Minstrel's Ghost ===
- "The Road To Avalon" (2012)

=== With Karmakanic ===
- "Entering The Spectra" (2002)
- "Wheel Of Life" (2004)
- "Who's The Boss In The Factory" (2008)
- "Live In The US" (2014)

=== With The Tangent ===
- "The Music That Died Alone" (2003)
- "The World That We Drive Through" (2004)
- "Pyramids & Stars (Live)" (2005)

=== With Tomas Bodin ===
- "Pinup Guru" (2002)
- "Sonic Boulevard" (2003)

=== With Lifesigns ===
- Altitude (2021)
