= Paradox Hotel =

Studio album by The Flower Kings
- Released: 4 April 2006
- Recorded: 18–24 November 2005
- Genre: Progressive rock
- Length: 136:00
- Label: InsideOut Music
- Producer: Roine Stolt

The Flower Kings chronology
| Adam & Eve (2004) | Paradox Hotel (2006) | Instant Delivery (2006) |

Professional ratings
Review scores
| Source | Rating |
|---|---|
| Allmusic | 3.5/5 stars |

Paradox Hotel is the ninth studio album by the progressive rock band The Flower Kings, released on 4 April 2006. It is also the band's fourth studio double-CD.

This is the band's only studio album with the drummer Marcus Liliequist (he is also on the live album Instant Delivery). While most of the band's other albums were mainly based on compositions by Roine Stolt and Tomas Bodin, this album shows more songwriting participation by other members.

== Track listing ==
All tracks are written by Roine Stolt, except where noted

=== Disc One – "Room 111" ===
| No. | Title | Writer(s) | Length |
|---|---|---|---|
| 1. | "Check In" (instrumental) | Tomas Bodin | 1:37 |
| 2. | "Monsters & Men": "I. Seasons of War"; "II. Prophets and Preachers"; "III. Silent River" | | 21:21 |
| 3. | "Jealousy" | | 3:22 |
| 4. | "Hit Me with a Hit" | | 5:32 |
| 5. | "Pioneers of Aviation" (instrumental) | | 7:49 |
| 6. | "Lucy Had a Dream" | Bodin, Stolt | 5:28 |
| 7. | "Bavarian Skies" | | 6:34 |
| 8. | "Self-Consuming Fire" | | 5:49 |
| 9. | "Mommy Leave the Light On" | | 4:38 |
| 10. | "End on a High Note" | | 10:43 |
| Total length: | | | 72:53 |

=== Disc Two – "Room 222" ===
| No. | Title | Music | Length |
|---|---|---|---|
| 1. | "Minor Giant Steps" | | 12:12 |
| 2. | "Touch My Heaven" | Bodin | 6:10 |
| 3. | "The Unorthodox Dancing Lesson" (instrumental) | | 5:24 |
| 4. | "Man of the World" | Bodin, Jonas Reingold, Stolt | 5:55 |
| 5. | "Life Will Kill You" | Hasse Fröberg | 7:05 |
| 6. | "The Way the Waters Are Moving" | Bodin, Stolt | 3:12 |
| 7. | "What If God Is Alone" | Fröberg, Reingold, Stolt | 6:58 |
| 8. | "Paradox Hotel" | Bodin, Stolt | 6:29 |
| 9. | "Blue Planet" | | 9:42 |
| Total length: | | | 63:05 |

== Personnel ==
- Tomas Bodin – keyboards, vocals
- Hasse Bruniusson – marimba, percussion
- Hasse Fröberg – vocals, guitars
- Marcus Liliequist – drums, percussion, vocals
- Jonas Reingold – bass guitar, vocals
- Roine Stolt – vocals, guitars

=== Additional personnel ===
- Andrés Valle – artwork
