= Magic Pie =

Magic Pie may refer to:

- "Magic Pie", a song by the Flower Kings from Flower Power, 1999
- "Magic Pie", a song by Kazaky, 2014
- "Magic Pie", a song by Oasis from Be Here Now, 1997
