= Invention of Knowledge =

Studio album by Anderson/Stolt
- Released: 24 June 2016
- Recorded: 2014–2016
- Studios: California, United States and Fenix Studios, Varnhem, Sweden
- Genres: Progressive rock, neo progressive rock
- Length: 65:04
- Label: InsideOutMusic
- Producer: Roine Stolt

Anderson/Stolt chronology
Better Late Than Never (2015)	Invention of Knowledge (2016)	1000 Hands: Chapter One (2019)

Invention of Knowledge is a studio album by Anderson/Stolt, a musical collaboration formed by singer-songwriters and musicians Jon Anderson and Roine Stolt. It was released on 24 June 2016 by InsideOutMusic. The project originated in 2014 after Anderson had performed with Stolt on a progressive rock-themed cruise, and the two decided to record an album. The recording process involved Anderson recording ideas in demo form in California and sending them online to Stolt in Sweden, who would develop music based on them. Invention of Knowledge was recorded in Sweden by several musicians, including Tom Brislin, Daniel Gildenlöw, and members of Stolt's band The Flower Kings.

Invention of Knowledge received some positive reviews from critics. It charted in several countries, and reached number 58 on the UK Albums Chart. Anderson and Stolt discussed the idea of performing the album live on tour, but no tour for the album was mounted. As of 2023, the collaboration between the two artists appears to have concluded and no further releases are planned.

== Background ==
Anderson is an English singer-songwriter and musician, formerly of the progressive rock band Yes, and Stolt is a Swedish guitarist and songwriter of The Flower Kings and Transatlantic. Stolt's record company owner, Thomas Waber of InsideOutMusic, a German independent record label, suggested that he work with Anderson roughly "four or five years ago", but it did not materialise. Stolt was a fan of Yes music, and Anderson had been one of his long time favourite musicians. The two first met in February 2014 when Anderson performed at Progressive Nation at Sea, a progressive rock-themed cruise voyage, with Stolt and members of Transatlantic as Anderson's backing band performing several Yes songs. The following day, Waber talked to Stolt and felt it was the right time to collaborate with Anderson. Said Stolt, "So it just went from there."

Around a month after the cruise, InsideOutMusic got in touch with Anderson with the proposal of a "progressive rock type of project" with Stolt and financed by the label. Both musicians then agreed to collaborate and record an album; Stolt recalled a formal contract was not ironed out until around "six or seven months" into the project when the two felt they had a substantial amount of good material. "After a couple of weeks, of months, you could see that this could actually be something", said Stolt, and signed, with Anderson, a two-album record deal.

== Writing and recording ==
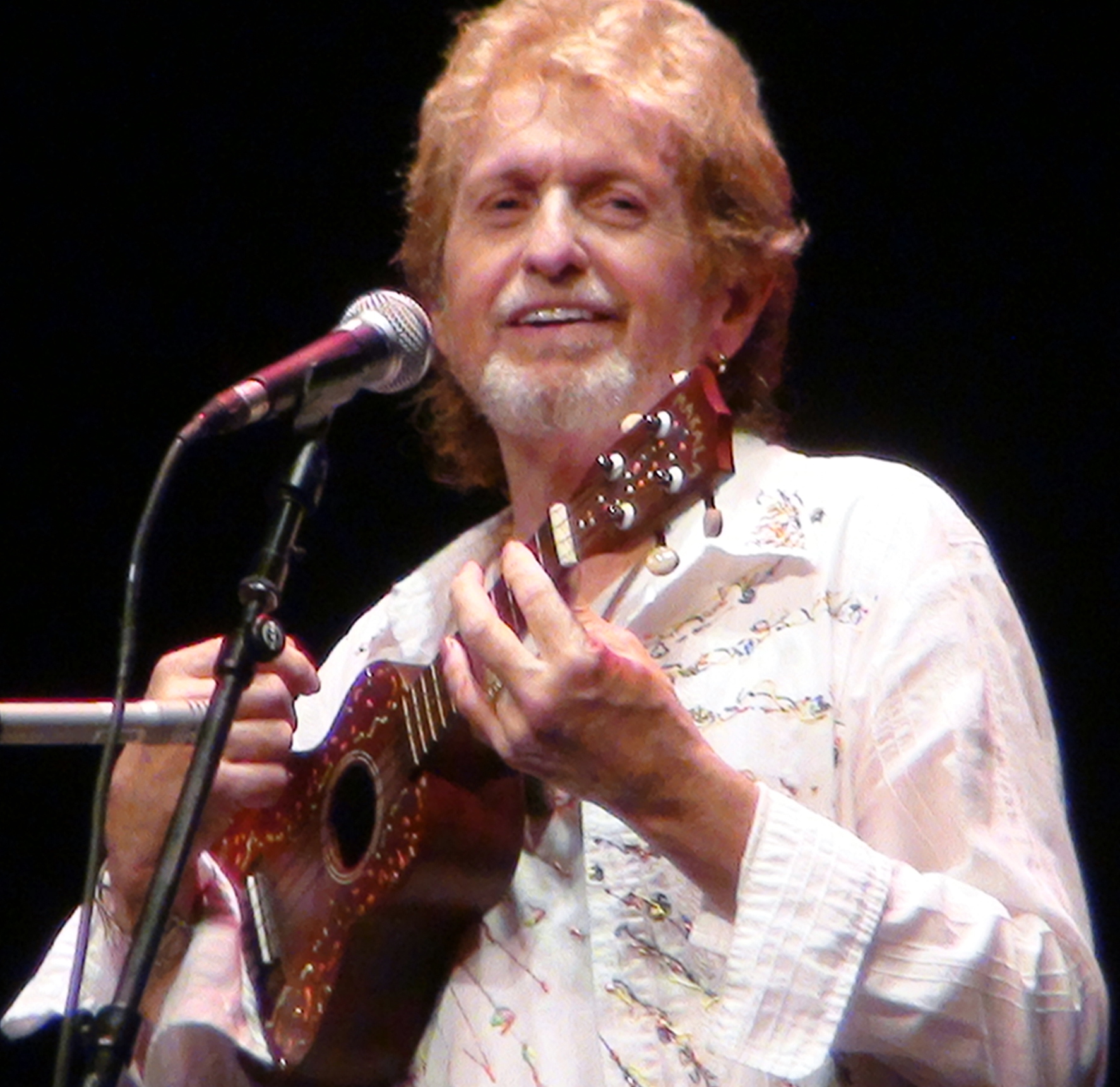
Anderson and Stolt.

In the summer of 2014, Anderson and Stolt began writing and recording Invention of Knowledge on an "off and on" basis, a process that lasted for around eighteen months. Both would take time away to work on other projects, and resume work on the album fresh. Following their initial meeting on the cruise, Anderson only met Stolt once more in Los Angeles for a promotional photo shoot for the album. He added: "We spoke over the phone a bit, but we knew what we wanted without speaking about it". Anderson had a particular interest to produce "long-form music" for the album, to take the listener on a musical "journey". He suggested to Stolt that they try and make "progressive music", a term that Stolt saw as music that did not sound like it was made in the 1970s, the peak of the progressive rock genre. He had plentiful amount of material written, some of it dating from a decade earlier, that he wished to use for an album, with "certain ones that stand together very well". Stolt wished the album to present music he described as "modern and classical, rock, tribal and orchestrated, grooving and floating ... leaning forward, surprising and also comforting with familiar run-arounds."

Much of the album's recording process involved Anderson recording a lyrical and music idea in demo form from his home in California and sending the music files online to Stolt in Sweden, who then "rejuvenated the music" with his contributions while keeping the idea behind each piece "intact". By the time Anderson sent his first set of ideas, around twenty minutes of music had been outlined. Anderson added: "It was the music that was in between the songs that captivated me because it gave me the chance to add more song lyrical, vocalising ideas". The two used Logic Pro to record their parts that were converted and worked on in the studio using Pro Tools. Stolt constructed the tracks using sequencers and programmed drums and "laying all the instruments" to form a demo version of the album that was more detailed than a usual demo recording. To him it sounded "almost" like a completed album, but it required musicians to play the already written material in real time within a studio. He intentionally left specific areas in the music open to allow the musicians to incorporate their own ideas into the arrangements. When Stolt had formed an outline of the bass, drums, keyboard and guitar parts, he sent the mix to Anderson, who could then mix some of the tracks on his computer, a process which at times lead to him writing new vocal melodies or lyrics and sending his changes back to Stolt.

After the writing process, Stolt hand picked ten additional musicians to record the additional parts at Fenix Studios in Varnhem, Sweden. American musician Tom Brislin, who played keyboards on Yes' 2001 tour, flew to Sweden from the United States to record his sections on piano, synthesiser, and Hammond organ. Swedish musicians, bassist Jonas Reingold, bassist Michael Stolt (Roine's brother) and drummer Felix Lehrmann are past or current members of Stolt's progressive rock band The Flower Kings. Swedish keyboardist Lalle Larsson plays the piano and synthesiser, and five people sing the backing vocals, recorded in March 2015: Daniel Gildenlöw, Nad Sylvan, Anja Obermayer, Maria Rerych and Kristina Westas. Stolt also contributed to some of the backing vocals. At the end of recording, Stolt prepared the album's final mix in February and March 2016. He summarised the recording experience as "a very interesting and rewarding time and the result is just insanely detailed."

Invention of Knowledge is formed of three extended suites: "Invention of Knowledge", "Knowing" and "Everybody Heals", and a single track, "Know...". The first part of "Invention of Knowledge", titled "Invention", was the first piece of music written exchanged between Anderson and Stolt for the project. It originated from Anderson, who had a piece featuring a string section, a "very sort of John Adams, rhythmic strings, cellos" idea, combined with several ideas by English musician Neil Campbell of the Bulbs, who Anderson befriended and also contributed to the writing of "Everybody Heals" and Golden Light".

The album's lyrics were penned by Anderson, who spoke of its general idea: "The invention of our understanding of the world around us". Several themes are addressed, such as ley lines.

== Release and reception ==
Professional ratings
Review scores
Source	Rating
AllMusic	4/5 stars
Progressive Music Planet	10/10
The prog report	very favourable

After its official announcement on 17 March 2016, Invention of Knowledge was first released for CD and digital download on 24 June. Its release for CD in North America followed on 8 July 2016.

Invention of Knowledge received several positive reviews from critics. In his positive review for AllMusic, Thom Jurek gave the album four stars out of five. He called the musicians involved a "prog dream team" and praised Anderson's and Stolt's use of their musical abilities and production. The interlocking pieces, he thought, are "brightly orchestrated and lushly illustrated with keyboards and choral vocals". In summary, he cited the album added to the "depth, dimension, and legacy" that Yes established, "but also make plain that the result is forward-thinking 21st century prog, free of overwrought nostalgia or self-indulgence". Chris Roberts reviewed the album for Prog magazine, a division of TeamRock. He thought the collaboration between Anderson and Stolt seemed to be "one of those inspired ideas which is almost so obviously bound to work that you fear there's going to be a catch". He nonetheless praised the record, "a beautiful album that's effectively the best of both worlds. There's no sense of cagey compromise or polite deference, and both artists extend themselves freely, exploring and expressing vast swathes of musical terrain". He compared the music to the 1970s era of Yes music with Anderson's first solo album, Olias of Sunhillow, "without mimicking them".

Anderson and Stolt discussed the idea of performing the album live on tour "many times" during its recording, though ultimately no such tour materialized.

Invention of Knowledge was nominated for a Progressive Music Award for Album of the Year at the 2016 awards.

About the album, Anderson stated:

Music is always the driving force in my life. Working with such a wonderful musician as Roine Stolt made the creation of this album very unique, we are very excited with the release of Invention Of Knowledge.

Stolt added:

It is not aiming at being new Yes music, just new music—modern and classical, rock, tribal and orchestrated, grooving and floating. Hopefully in the true spirit of progressive—leaning forward, surprising and also comforting with familiar run-arounds. We've been "inventing" as we go along—Jon is an endless source of new ideas. We've been bouncing ideas back and forth for months and as a result there are probably dozens of versions of these songs. It's been a very interesting and rewarding time and the result is just insanely detailed.

== Track listing ==
All lyrics by Jon Anderson.

"Invention of Knowledge" (22:52)
No.	Title	Writer(s)	Length
1.	"Invention"	Jon Anderson, Neil Campbell, Roine Stolt	9:41
2.	"We Are Truth"	Anderson, Dan Spollen	6:41
3.	"Knowledge"	Anderson, Campbell, Stolt	6:30

"Knowing" (17:48)
No.	Title	Writer(s)	Length
4.	"Knowing"	Anderson, Kristian Ducharme, Stolt	10:31
5.	"Chase and Harmony"	Anderson, Ducharme	7:17

"Everybody Heals" (13:09)
No.	Title	Writer(s)	Length
6.	"Everybody Heals"	Anderson, Stolt, Campbell, Joseph Cowell, Andy Maslivec, Marty Snape	7:36
7.	"Better by Far"	Anderson, Spollen	2:03
8.	"Golden Light"	Anderson, Stolt, Campbell, Cowell, Maslivec, Snape	3:30

"Know..." (11:13)
No.	Title	Writer(s)	Length
9.	"Know..."	Anderson, Ducharme, Stolt	11:10

== Personnel ==
Credits are adapted from the CD's liner notes.

Anderson/Stolt

- Jon Anderson – lead and backing vocals, synthesiser, percussion
- Roine Stolt – electric guitar, acoustic guitars, Dobro, Portuguese guitar, lap steel guitar, keyboards, percussion, backing vocals

Additional musicians

- Tom Brislin – Yamaha C7 grand piano, Fender Rhodes piano, Hammond B-3 organ, synthesizers
- Lalle Larsson – grand piano, synthesizer
- Jonas Reingold – bass guitar, backing vocals
- Michael Stolt – bass guitar, Moog bass
- Felix Lehrmann – drums
- Daniel Gildenlöw – backing vocals
- Nad Sylvan – backing vocals
- Anja Obermayer – backing vocals
- Maria Rerych – backing vocals
- Kristina Westas – backing vocals

Production

- Roine Stolt – production, mixing at Cosmic Lodge, February–March 2016
- Jon Anderson – co-production
- Lars Hallbäck – backing vocals recording
- Jonas Reingold – mastering
- Silas Toball – artwork
- Eva Toball – artwork assistant
- Johnny Taxen – photographs
- Per Kristianssen – photographs
- Lilian Westin – photographs
- Anders Olsson – photographs
- Hans Froberg – photographs
- Erik Edlund – photographs

== Charts ==
Chart (2016)	Peak position
Austrian Albums (Ö3 Austria)	61
Belgian Albums (Ultratop Flanders)	115
Dutch Albums (Album Top 100)	56
French Albums (SNEP)	183
German Albums (Offizielle Top 100)	18
Swiss Albums (Schweizer Hitparade)	26
UK Albums (Official Charts)	58
