= Desolation Rose =

Studio album by the Flower Kings
- Released: 29 October 2013
- Recorded: March–April 2013
- Genre: Progressive rock
- Length: 59:37
- Label: Inside Out Music

The Flower Kings chronology
Banks of Eden (2012)	Desolation Rose (2013)	Waiting for Miracles (2019)

Desolation Rose is the twelfth studio album by the progressive rock band the Flower Kings. The album was released on 29 October 2013. The album peaked at #35 in the 2013 Top Heatseekers chart.

== Track listing ==
=== Disc One ===
No.	Title	Writer(s)	Length
1.	"Tower One"	Roine Stolt	13:39
2.	"Sleeping Bones"	The Flower Kings	4:16
3.	"Desolation Road"	Stolt	4:00
4.	"White Tuxedos"	Stolt, Jonas Reingold	6:30
5.	"The Resurrected Judas"	The Flower Kings	8:24
6.	"Silent Masses"	Stolt	6:17
7.	"Last Carnivore"	Stolt	4:22
8.	"Dark Fascist Skies"	The Flower Kings	6:05
9.	"Blood of Eden"	Stolt	3:12
10.	"Silent Graveyards"	Stolt	2:52
Total length:			59:37

=== Bonus Disc ===
No.	Title	Length
1.	"Runaway Train"	4:41
2.	"Interstellar Visitations"	8:24
3.	"Lazy Monkey"	2:25
4.	"Psalm 2013"	2:10
5.	"The Wailing Wall"	3:18
6.	"Badbeats"	5:24
7.	"Burning Spears"	3:15
8.	"The Final Era"	2:57

== Personnel ==
- Roine Stolt – vocals, guitars
- Hasse Fröberg – vocals, guitars
- Jonas Reingold – bass guitar
- Tomas Bodin – keyboards
- Felix Lehrmann – drums

=== Guest musicians ===
- Michael Stolt – chorus vocals (10)
- Declan Burke – chorus vocals (10)
- Nad Sylvan – chorus vocals (10)
- Andy Tillison – chorus vocals (10)
- Edgel Groves, Sr. – chorus vocals (10)
- Edgel Groves, Jr. – chorus vocals (10)
- Daniel Gordon – chorus vocals (10)

== Charts ==
Chart (2013)	Peak position
Belgian Albums (Ultratop Flanders)	187
Belgian Albums (Ultratop Wallonia)	91
Dutch Albums (Album Top 100)	53
German Albums (Offizielle Top 100)	92
US Heatseekers Albums (Billboard)	35
