= The Road Back Home =

The Road Back Home may refer to:

- The Road Back Home (The Flower Kings album), 2007
- The Road Back Home (Loreena McKennitt album), 2024
