= Yesterdays (band) =

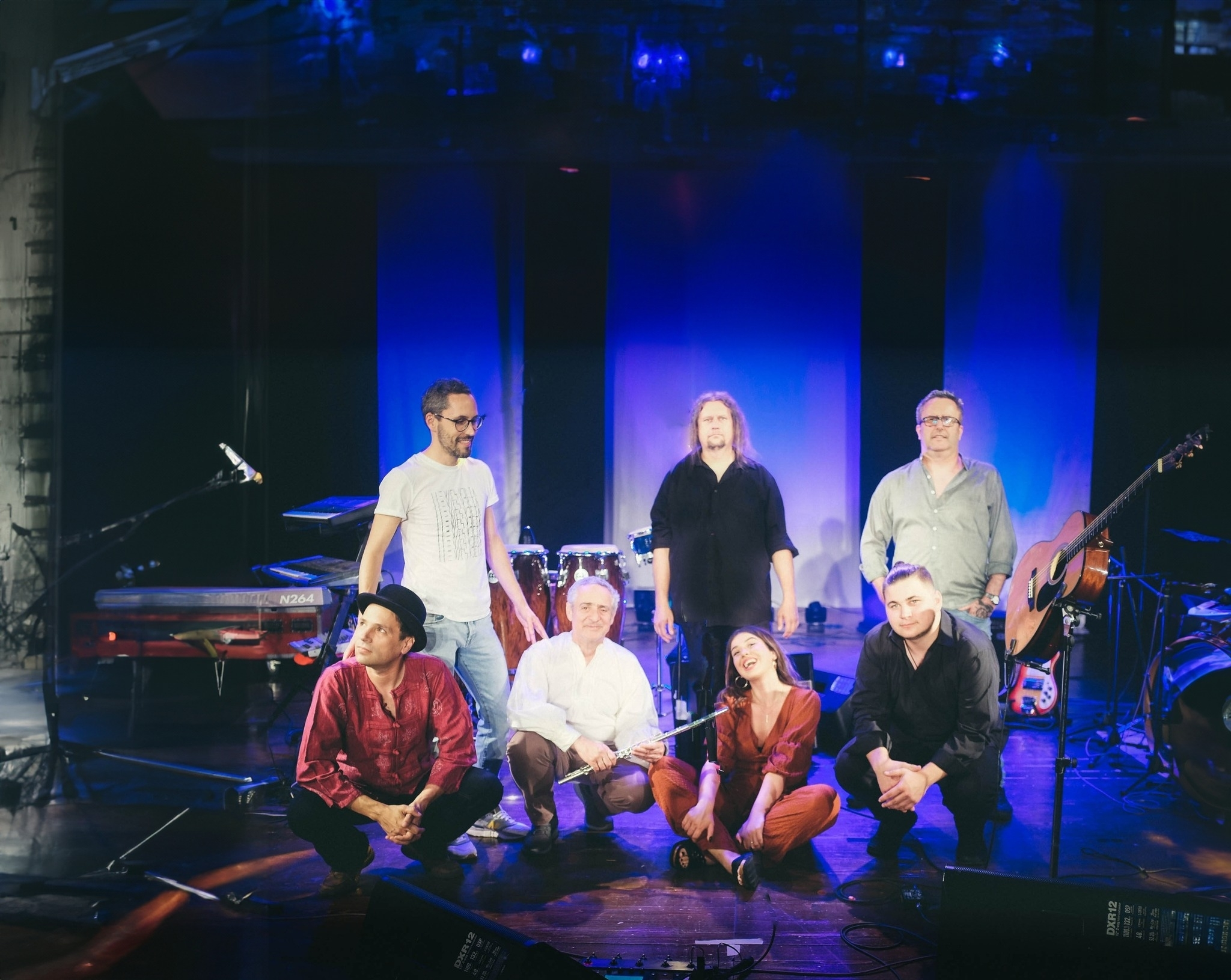
- Yesterdays in 2023

Background information
- Origin: Romania
- Genre: Progressive rock
- Years active: 2000-present
- Label: Seacrest Oy
- Members: Bogáti-Bokor Ákos; Csajkos Nándor; Kecskeméti Gábor; Kósa Dávid; Tóth Gábor; Zsigó László
- Website: www.yesterdaysband.eu

Yesterdays is a Hungarian symphonic progressive rock band based in Carei, Romania.

Its musical style has been compared by various reviewers to Yes , Quidam , Pat Metheny, Anna Maria Jopek , Eclipse (from Brazil) and Genesis.

== Biography ==
In 2004 the band won its first First Prize at the Félsziget Fesztivál's Talentum competition in Targu Mures (Romania).

In 2006 it released its album, Holdfénykert (Moonlit Garden) on a small Hungarian record label: Rockszerviz. This first edition was sold out in 6 months. The band played in the Netherlands at the ProgFarm Festival (4 November 2006, Bakkeveen, The Netherlands).

In February 2007, Yesterdays and Rockszerviz Records organized the first MiniProg Festival (Budapest, Ship A38) in Budapest with two other bands: Flamborough Head from the Netherlands and ex-Yes guitarist Peter Banks' Harmony In Diversity (U.K.).

After some member changes the band worked on some new songs, a 20 minutes long epic for the upcoming Colossus Magazine/Musea release The Spaghetti Epic III and on a 5 minutes progrock hit with Jonas Reingold, the bassist of The Flower Kings, for Dante's Inferno (a new Colossus/Musea project CD box).

In 2008, Holdfénykert was re-released by the famous French label, Musea Records. The CD came out as an "Enhanced and Remastered" edition, with some multimedia bonuses.

In July 2008 "It's So Divine" from the Holdfénykert album reached position 23 on "City FM 106,2" (Romanian Radio) National Top 30 Hit Chart.

Yesterdays' second album called Colours Caffé has been released by Hungarian label Rockszerviz in January 2011. The album features 11 new songs and a hidden track. It seems that Yesterdays had the chance to play with their Hungarian influences, like Tamás Mohai (ex. East, Faxni, RABB, etc.), Hungary's most wanted session drummer Gergely Borlai. The album's mastering was done by King's X guitarist Ty Tabor at the Alien Beans Studio. Not long after the album's debut it was released by DiskUnion in Japan as a double CD (enhanced with a bonus CD, including old demos, alternate versions and even brand new songs).

== Projects ==
  - The Spaghetti Epic III. was a project CD with 3 bands involved, each band had to write a 20 minutes long progressive rock epic inspired by Sergio Corbucci's famous tragic western movie called "The Great Silence"

This CD was released in January 2009 by Musea Records

  - Inferno was a 4CD project with 34 involved bands from all around the world and thematically it is based on Dante's Inferno, the first part of the Divine Comedy. Yesterdays did its contribution with two guest musicians: David Speight (current drummer of ex-Yes guitarist Peter Banks (U.K.) and bass guitar player of The Flower Kings: Jonas Reingold.

This CD was released in December 2008 by Musea Records

  - Purgatorio was a 4CD project too with 34 bands composing 34 songs based on the canto's of Dante. Purgatorio is the second part of the Divine Comedy. Yesterdays did a song based on Canto XXX.

This CD was released in October 2009 by Musea Records

  - Paradiso was the final chapter of Dante's Divine Comedy trilogy, a very exciting 4 CD box. Yesterdays covered Dante's Canto nr. XXXIII, the title of the song is "33".
  - Yesterdays paid their tribute to the Swedish progressive rock band The Flower Kings covering their song called My Cosmic Lover. The 4CD box was released by French label Musea Records
  - Senki madara was the 3rd full album release by Yesterdays. The concept was to bring ancient Hungarian traditional songs, music into progressive rock territory.

On 11 May 2020 Yesterdays keyboard player Zsolt Enyedi passed away.

== Personnel ==
=== Members ===
- Bogáti-Bokor Ákos - guitars, keyboards, vocals
- Csajkos Nándor - bass guitar
- Kecskeméti Gábor - flute
- Kósa Dávid - percussion
- Tóth Gábor - keyboards
- Zsigó László - drums

== Discography ==
- Official albums:

2006, Oct: Holdfénykert - (Rockszerviz Records rsz-001)
2008, May: Holdfénykert (Enhanced and Remastered) - (Musea Records FGBG 4748.AR)
2011, Jan: Colours Caffé (Author's Edition)
2014, Sept: Holdfénykert - Audiophile 3rd Edition (Seacrest Oy SCR1010)
2018, Oct: Senki madara - (Author's Edition)
2020, Oct: Colours Caffé 10th Anniversary Remixed and Limited Edition - (Author's Edition)
2022, Oct: Saint-Exupéry álma - (Author's Edition)
2023, Sept: A Moonlit Night in Budapest - (Live Album - Author's Edition)
2024, Jan: Senki madara 2nd edition - (Remaster - Author's Edition)
2024, Dec: Holdfénykert 4th edition - (Remaster + Bonus Tracks - Author's Edition)
2025, Jan: The Little Prince and Other Stories - Live - (Live Album - Author's Edition)

2026, Oct: Arlequin - (Author's Edition)

- EPs, Single CDs:

2004, May: Yesterdays' Dream is Now, A Whole Half (EP) (Author's Limited Edition)
2012, January: Winter (EP) (Author's Limited Edition)
2012, March: Almost Like Love (Single) (Author's Edition, Digital download)
2015, March: Find Another Light (Single) (Author's Edition, Digital download)
2016, October: Várj még (Single) (Author's Edition, Digital download)
2016, December: Indulok-érkezel (Single) (Author's Edition, Digital download)
2018, June: It's Not the End of the World (Single) (Author's Edition, Digital download)
2019, December: Cheesecake (Single) (Author's Edition, Digital download)
2020, May: Waltz for the Lost Deer (Single - in memoriam Enyedi Zsolt) (Author's Edition, Digital download)
2020, Nov: Never Knowing Why (Single) (Author's Edition, Digital download) 2024, Jan: Petőfi Felhő Projekt (EP) (Author's Edition, Digital download)

2026, Sept: Írj nekem egy dalt - (Single) (Author's Edition)

- Contributions, recordings on conceptual CDs, compilations:

2008, Nov: Various Artists - Dante's Divine Comedy - Part I - Inferno (Musea Records FGBG 4753)
2009, Jan: Various Artists - The Spaghetti Epic vol. III. - The Greatest Silence (Musea Records FGBG 4731)
2009, Apr: Various Artists - Tuonen Tytar II. A Tribute to Finnish Prog (Musea Records FGBG 4816)
2009, Oct: Various Artists - Dante's Divine Comedy - Part II - Purgatorio (Musea Records FGBG 4836)
2010, Oct: Various Artists - Dante's Divine Comedy - Part III - Paradiso (Musea Records FGBG 4861)
2011, Jun: Various Artists - A Flower Full Of Stars - A Tribute To The Flower Kings (Musea Records FGBG 4887)
2012, May: Various Artists - Tales From The Edge - A Tribute To Yes (Mellow Records MMP 519 A/B/C)
2018, May: From the Vault - Compilation of previously unreleased tracks (Author's Edition)

== Reviews ==
- www.progressive-area.com
- www.arlequins.it
- www.musearecords.com
- Dutch Progressive Rock Pages
- www.progressor.net
- Music In Belgium
- ProGGnosis
- BabyBlaue Seiten
