= Banks of Eden =

Studio album by the Flower Kings
- Released: 19 June 2012
- Genre: Progressive rock
- Length: 53:59
- Label: Inside Out Music
- Producer: Roine Stolt

The Flower Kings chronology
Tour Kaputt (2011)	Banks of Eden (2012)	Desolation Rose (2013)

Professional ratings
Review scores
Source	Rating
AllMusic	3.5/5 stars
Sputnikmusic	4/5 stars

Banks of Eden is the eleventh studio album by the progressive rock band the Flower Kings. The album was released on 19 June 2012. It is the first album with drummer Felix Lehrmann. The album reached #45 in the 2012 Top Heatseekers chart.

== Track listing ==
No.	Title	Writer(s)	Length
1.	"Numbers"	Roine Stolt	25:26
2.	"For the Love of Gold"	Stolt, Bodin	7:26
3.	"Pandemonium"	Stolt	6:09
4.	"For Those About to Drown"	Stolt	7:06
5.	"Rising the Imperial"	Jonas Reingold	7:52
Total length:			53:59

=== Bonus disc ===
No.	Title	Writer(s)	Length
1.	"Illuminati"	Stolt	5:56
2.	"Fireghosts"	Stolt	5:50
3.	"Going Up"	Reingold	5:10
4.	"LoLines"	Stolt	4:24
Total length:			21:20

Extra material:

No.	Title	Length
1.	"Video interview with the band in the studio"	20:00

== Personnel ==
- Roine Stolt – vocals, guitars
- Hasse Fröberg – vocals, guitars
- Jonas Reingold – vocals, bass guitar
- Tomas Bodin – organ, piano, mellotron and minimoogs
- Felix Lehrmann – drums

== Charts ==
Chart (2012)	Peak position
Belgian Albums (Ultratop Wallonia)	192
Dutch Albums (Album Top 100)	64
German Albums (Offizielle Top 100)	68
Swedish Albums (Sverigetopplistan)	27
US Heatseekers Albums (Billboard)	45

== Notes ==
1.Track length is rounded to the nearest multiple of 5 on the case.
