= Look at You Now (album) =

Studio album by the Flower Kings
- Released: 8 September 2023
- Genre: Progressive rock
- Length: 68:40
- Label: Inside Out Music, Sony Music

The Flower Kings chronology
By Royal Decree (2022)	Look at You Now (2023)	Love (2025)

Look at You Now is the sixteenth studio album by the progressive rock band the Flower Kings, released on 8 September 2023.

== Track listing ==
Look at You Now track listing
No.	Title	Length
1.	"Beginner's Eyes"	4:36
2.	"The Dream"	4:39
3.	"Hollow Man"	5:01
4.	"Dr. Ribedeaux"	3:04
5.	"Mother Earth"	4:17
6.	"The Queen"	5:27
7.	"The Light in Your Eyes"	5:47
8.	"Seasons End"	5:26
9.	"Scars"	5:28
10.	"Stronghold"	6:46
11.	"Father Sky"	3:08
12.	"Day for Peace"	3:13
13.	"Look at You Now"	11:48
Total length:		68:40

== Personnel ==
The Flower Kings

- Roine Stolt – vocals, guitars, keyboards, percussion
- Hasse Fröberg – vocals, guitar
- Michael Stolt – bass, vocals, keyboards (5, 11), guitar (2)
- Mirko DeMaio – drums and percussion, keyboard (12)

Guest musicians

- Jannica Lund – backing vocals (1–3, 5, 7, 11, 13)
- Hasse Bruniusson – percussion (3)
- Lalle Larsson – synthesizers (4, 9)
- Jörgen Sälde – nylon guitar (6)
- Marjana Semkina – vocals (12)

Additional credits

- Lars Hallbäck – engineer
- Thomas Ewerhard – layout
- Roine Stolt – producer, mixing

== Charts ==
Chart performance for Look at You Now
Chart (2023)	Peak position
German Albums (Offizielle Top 100)	49
Swiss Albums (Schweizer Hitparade)	27
