= The Flower King =

Studio album by Roine Stolt
- Released: 1994
- Genre: Progressive rock, symphonic rock
- Length: 70:31
- Label: Foxtrot Records
- Producer: Roine Stolt

Roine Stolt chronology
The Lonely Heartbeat (1989)	The Flower King (1994)	Hydrophonia (1998)

The Flower King is the third solo album by Roine Stolt. The original line-up for the album consisted of Stolt (vocals, electric guitar, bass guitar, keyboards), Jaime Salazar (drums), and Hasse Fröberg (vocals). They later formed the band The Flower Kings and released their debut album Back in the World of Adventures the following year.

== Track listing ==
All tracks are written by Roine Stolt

No.	Title	Length
1.	"The Flower King"	10:32
2.	"Dissonata"	10:02
3.	"The Magic Circus of Zeb"	7:06
4.	"Close Your Eyes"	3:12
5.	"The Pilgrims Inn"	9:20
6.	"The Sounds of Violence"	5:41
7.	"Humanizzimo a. "Twilight Flower" b. "The Messenger" c. "The Nail" d. "Only Human" e. "This Is The Night" f. "The Flower of Love""	20:53
8.	"Scanning The Greenhouse"	3:45

== Personnel ==
Musicians

- Roine Stolt – lead vocals (1-2,4,7-8), guitars, (all), bass guitar (1-3,5-8), keyboards (all), percussion (3-4,7-8)
- Hasse Fröberg – vocals (1,8)
- Ulf Wallander – soprano saxophone (5,7)
- Hasse Bruniusson – drums (3,5,7-8), percussion
- Jaime Salazar – drums (1,2,6), percussion (2,6)
- Dexter Frank Jr. (Roine Stolt) – keyboards, electronics
- Don Azzaro (Roine Stolt) – bass guitar, Moog Taurus

Other credits

- Dexter Frank Jr. (Roine Stolt) – engineer
