= Meet the Flower Kings =

Live album by The Flower Kings
- Released: November 4, 2003
- Recorded: February 10, 2003
- Genre: Progressive rock
- Length: 152:52
- Label: InsideOut Music
- Producer: Roine Stolt

The Flower Kings chronology
| Unfold the Future (2002) | Meet the Flower Kings (2003) | Adam & Eve (2004) |

Professional ratings
Review scores
| Source | Rating |
|---|---|
| Allmusic | 4.5/5 stars |

Meet the Flower Kings is the second live album by the progressive rock band The Flower Kings. It was released in 2003 as a double-CD, and also as a two-disc DVD concert video. A limited release book-case version of this includes both the 2-CD and 2-DVD sets together, along with a booklet.

The show was recorded at the Stadsteater in Uppsala, Sweden, on February 10, 2003.

== Track listing ==
All songs by Roine Stolt except where noted.

=== Disc One ===
| No. | Title | Length |
|---|---|---|
| 1. | "The Truth Will Set You Free" (Stolt) I. "Lonely Road" II. "Primal Instincts" III. "From The Source" IV. "Uphill" V. "The Sun The Stars The Moon") | 31:20 |
| 2. | ""Garden Of Dreams" Part 1" (Bodin, Stolt) I. "Dawn" II. "Simple Song" III. "Business Vamp" IV. "All You Can Save" V. "Mr. Hope Goes To Wall Street" VI. "Attack of the Monster Briefcase/Mr. Hope goes to Wall Street" VII. "Did I Tell You") | 27:07 |
| 3. | ""Garden Of Dreams" Part 2" (Bodin, Stolt) VIII. "Garden of Dreams" IX. "Don't Let The D'Evil In" X. "Love Is The Word" XI. "Gardens Revisited" XII. "Shadowland" XIII. "The Final Deal") | 17:20 |
| Total length: | | 75:47 |

=== Disc Two ===
| No. | Title | Length |
|---|---|---|
| 1. | ""Humanizzimo"" (Stolt) I. "Twilight Flower" II. "The Messenger" III. "The Nail" IV. "Only Human" V. "This Is The Night" VI. "The Flower Of Love") | 23:10 |
| 2. | "Circus Brimstone" (Bodin, Stolt) | 11:18 |
| 3. | "Silent Inferno" (Stolt) | 16:13 |
| 4. | "Stardust We Are" | 26:24 |
| Total length: | | 77:05 |

=== DVD version ===
==== Disc One ====
1. The Truth Will Set You Free
2. On Tour in USA
3. Garden of Dreams, Part 1
4. On Tour in Europe
5. Garden of Dreams, Part 2
6. Setting Up for the DVD

==== Disc Two ====
1. Humanizzimo
2. Oddballs of Rehearsing
3. Circus Brimstone
4. In Recording Studio 2002
5. Silent Inferno
6. On Tour in South America 2001
7. Stardust We Are

== Personnel ==
1. Roine Stolt – guitar, vocals
2. Tomas Bodin – keyboard
3. Hasse Fröberg – guitar, vocals
4. Daniel Gildenlöw – guitar, backing vocals, keyboard, percussion
5. Hasse Brunisson – percussion, voice
6. Jonas Reingold – bass guitar, bass pedals
7. Zoltan Czörsz – drums
8. Pontus Eklund – dancer, juggler, flamethrower
9. Hea Ekstam-Bruniusson – dancer
