= Tour Kaputt =

Live album by The Flower Kings
- Released: 2011
- Recorded: November 15, 2007
- Venues: Cultuurpodium Boerderij (Zoetermeer, Netherlands)
- Genre: Progressive rock
- Length: 139:59

The Flower Kings chronology
The Sum of No Evil (2007)	Tour Kaputt (2011)	Banks of Eden (2012)

Tour Kaputt is a 2011 live album by the progressive rock group The Flower Kings. The CD was recorded at Cultuurpodium Boerderij in Zoetermeer, Netherlands, in 2007, during the tour for The Sum Of No Evil for which the band enlisted as guest drummer Pat Mastelotto of King Crimson fame. The title of the album is a reference to one of the crew's comments after the group's tour bus struck an animal.

== Track listing ==
all tracks are written by Roine Stolt, except where noted.

=== Disc 1 ===
No.	Title	Length
1.	"Love Is the Only Answer"	27:24
2.	"There Is More to This World"	10:23
3.	"Retropolis"	13:11
4.	"Trading My Soul"	6:35
5.	"Hudson River Sirens Call"	8:39
6.	"I Am the Sun"	12:37
Total length:		78:49

=== Disc 2 ===
No.	Title	Writer(s)	Length
1.	"Life in Motion"		12:36
2.	"Brimstone Flight 999"	Tomas Bodin	5:45
3.	"Babylon"	Bodin	3:53
4.	"Stardust We Are"		4:59
5.	"What If God Is Alone"		8:27
6.	"Blade of Cain"		6:31
7.	"The Sum of No Reason"		18:59
Total length:			61:10
