= The Rainmaker (album) =

Studio album by The Flower Kings
- Released: 18 September 2001
- Recorded: February – May 2001
- Genre: Progressive rock
- Length: 76:52
- Label: InsideOut Music
- Producer: Don Azzaro

The Flower Kings chronology
Space Revolver (2000)	The Rainmaker (2001)	Unfold the Future (2002)

Professional ratings
Review scores
Source	Rating
Allmusic	2.5/5 stars

The Rainmaker is the sixth studio album by the progressive rock band The Flower Kings. It was their first to receive a more mixed response from critics compared to their previous albums.

== Track listing ==
All tracks are written by Roine Stolt.

No.	Title	Length
1.	"Last Minute on Earth"	11:40
2.	"World Without a Heart"	4:29
3.	"Road to Sanctuary"	13:50
4.	"The Rainmaker" (instrumental)	6:02
5.	"City of Angels"	12:04
6.	"Elaine"	4:55
7.	"Thru the Walls"	4:31
8.	"Sword of God"	6:00
9.	"Blessing of a Smile" (instrumental)	3:12
10.	"Red Alert" (instrumental)	1:10
11.	"Serious Dreamers"	8:59

== Personnel ==
- Roine Stolt – vocals, guitars, additional keyboards
- Tomas Bodin – keyboards
- Hasse Fröberg – vocals
- Jonas Reingold – bass guitar
- Jaime Salazar – drums

with

- Hasse Bruniusson – percussion
- Ulf Wallander – soprano saxophone
