= The Sum of No Evil =

Studio album by The Flower Kings
- Released: 25 September 2007
- Recorded: Spring 2007
- Genre: Progressive rock
- Length: 74:52
- Label: InsideOut Music
- Producer: Roine Stolt, Petrus Königson

The Flower Kings chronology
The Road Back Home (2007)	The Sum of No Evil (2007)	Carpe Diem – The Flower Kings Live in USA (2008)

Professional ratings
Review scores
Source	Rating
DPRP	5.0/5 stars

The Sum of No Evil is the tenth studio album by the progressive rock band The Flower Kings, with the return of the drummer Zoltan Csörsz. The limited edition is supplied in a digipak and with a bonus disc.

== Track listing ==
All tracks are written by Roine Stolt, except where noted.

No.	Title	Writer(s)	Length
1.	"One More Time"		13:04
2.	"Love Is the Only Answer"		24:28
3.	"Trading My Soul"		6:25
4.	"The Sum of No Reason"		13:25
5.	"Flight 999 (Brimstone Air)" (instrumental)	Tomas Bodin	5:00
6.	"Life in Motion"		12:34
Total length:			74:56

=== Bonus Disc ===
No.	Title	Length
1.	"The River"	5:43
2.	"Turn the Stone"	5:06
3.	"Regal Divers (Demo)"	6:01

== Personnel ==
- Roine Stolt – vocals, guitars, additional keyboards
- Tomas Bodin – piano, organ, synthesizers, mellotron
- Hasse Fröberg – vocals, guitars
- Jonas Reingold – bass guitar
- Zoltan Csörsz – drums

with

- Hasse Bruniusson – marimba, glockenspiel, percussion
- Ulf Wallander – soprano saxophone
- Ed Unitsky – album artwork
