= Unfold the Future =

Studio album by The Flower Kings
- Released: 5 November 2002
- Recorded: June – September 2002
- Genre: Progressive rock
- Length: 140:58
- Label: InsideOut Music
- Producer: Don Azzaro

The Flower Kings chronology
The Rainmaker (2001)	Unfold the Future (2002)	Meet the Flower Kings (2003)

Professional ratings
Review scores
Source	Rating
AllMusic	3/5 stars
Progressiveworld.net	5/5 stars

Unfold the Future is the seventh studio album by the progressive rock band The Flower Kings, which was released in 2002. It is also the band's third studio double-CD. A limited special edition of the album contained an instrumental bonus track.

This album is the first appearance of both drummer Zoltan Csörsz, replacing the original member Jaime Salazar, and Pain of Salvation's frontman Daniel Gildenlöw, the latter as a guest vocalist on several tracks.

The style of the album shows several influences of jazz music and experimentation, with the inclusion of two free-form jams (or three, counting the special edition bonus track), along with the band's traditional symphonic progressive rock style.

In 2017, the album was remixed and reissued on vinyl. The 2017 version was also included in the box set A Kingdom of Colours: The Complete Collection from 1995–2002.

== Track listing ==
=== Disc One ===
No.	Title	Music	Length
1.	"The Truth Will Set You Free": "I. Lonely Road"; "II. Primal Instincts"; "III. From the Source"; "IV. Uphill"; "V. The Stars the Sun the Moon"	Roine Stolt	31:01
2.	"Monkey Business"	Stolt	4:23
3.	"Black and White"	Tomas Bodin, Stolt	7:39
4.	"Christianopel" (instrumental)	Bodin, Zoltan Csörsz, Jonas Reingold, Stolt	8:16
5.	"Silent Inferno"	Stolt	14:21
6.	"The Navigator"	Bodin, Stolt	3:39
7.	"Vox Humana"	Stolt	4:44
Total length:			74:03

=== Disc Two ===
No.	Title	Music	Length
1.	"Genie in a Bottle"	Stolt	8:09
2.	"Fast Lane"	Bodin	6:33
3.	"Grand Old World"	Stolt	5:26
4.	"Soul Vortex" (instrumental)	Bodin, Csörsz, Reingold, Stolt	4:38
5.	"Rollin' the Dice"	Bodin	5:00
6.	"The Devil's Danceschool" (instrumental)	Reingold	5:08
7.	"Man Overboard"	Stolt	3:45
8.	"Solitary Shell"	Bodin, Stolt	2:50
9.	"Devil's Playground"	Bodin, Stolt	25:26
10.	"Too Late for Tomatoes" (bonus track)	Bodin, Csörsz, Reingold, Stolt	10:24
Total length:			77:09

Note: For the 2017 reissue, "Devil's Playground" has a reduced running time of 19:02, and the 2022 remaster does not feature the bonus track.

== Personnel ==
=== Main band ===
- Tomas Bodin – keyboards
- Hasse Bruniusson – marimba, glockenspiel, dulcimer, other percussion
- Zoltan Csörsz – drums
- Hasse Fröberg – vocals, guitars
- Jonas Reingold – bass guitar
- Roine Stolt – vocals, guitars, keyboards

=== Guest musicians ===
- Daniel Gildenlöw – backing vocals, lead vocals on "Fast Lane", "Rollin' the Dice" and parts of "Devil's Playground"
- Ulf Wallander – soprano saxophone
- Anders Bergcrantz – trumpet
