= The Sea Within =

International rock supergroup

- Genres: Neo-prog, symphonic rock
- Years active: 2017–present
- Label: Inside Out Records
- Members: Roine Stolt; Jonas Reingold; Marco Minnemann; Tom Brislin; Daniel Gildenlöw

The Sea Within are an international rock supergroup founded in 2017, formed by Swedish guitarist and singer-songwriter Roine Stolt, bassist Jonas Reingold and guitarist Daniel Gildenlöw, German drummer Marco Minnemann, and American keyboardist Tom Brislin. Their self-titled debut album was released on 22 June 2018.

== History ==
=== The beginning ===
The band's formation was first announced in December 2017. Stolt recalled that the German-based independent record label Inside Out Music first suggested the idea of establishing a new band with strong songwriters. By the time of their announcement, their debut album was nearing completion. The group had gathered in north London to record at Livingston Studios which marked the first time the five had been in the same room together. Stolt realised such a risk would affect the music, but the experience turned into a successful and productive one after almost two hours of music was developed collectively and recorded. Stolt said their direction includes elements of progressive and art rock combined with pop and cinematic music.

Their self-titled debut album, featuring guest performances from keyboardist Jordan Rudess, singers Jon Anderson and Casey McPherson, and saxophonist Rob Townsend was released on 22 June 2018. The release was followed by their debut live gig at the Night of the Prog XIII festival in Lorelei, Germany, on 14 July 2018 as well as two gigs on the 2019 Cruise To The Edge.

== Band members ==
=== Current members ===
- Roine Stolt – guitar, vocals, keyboards
- Jonas Reingold – bass
- Marco Minnemann – drums, percussion, vocals, guitar
- Tom Brislin – keyboards, vocals
- Daniel Gildenlöw – vocals, guitar

=== Guest members ===
- Casey McPherson – vocals, guitar
- Jordan Rudess - keyboards, piano

== Discography ==
List of studio albums, with year released and chart positions
Title	Year	Peak chart positions								
Title	Year	GER	US Heat	BEL (Vl)	BEL (Wa)	FRA	NLD	SCO	SWI	UK Rock
The Sea Within	2018	23	24	174	144	138	74	63	32	7
