= Space Revolver =

Studio album by The Flower Kings
- Released: 4 July 2000
- Recorded: January – March 2000
- Genre: Progressive rock
- Length: 76:24
- Label: Century Media
- Producer: Don & Gepetto Azzaro

The Flower Kings chronology
Alive on Planet Earth (2000)	Space Revolver (2000)	The Rainmaker (2001)

Professional ratings
Review scores
Source	Rating
Allmusic	4/5 stars

Space Revolver is the fifth studio album by the progressive rock band The Flower Kings, released on 4 July 2000.

== Track listing ==
All tracks are written by Roine Stolt, except where noted.

No.	Title	Writer(s)	Length
1.	"I Am the Sun - Part One"		15:03
2.	"Dream On Dreamer"	Tomas Bodin, Stolt	2:43
3.	"Rumble Fish Twist" (instrumental)	Bodin	8:06
4.	"Monster Within"		12:55
5.	"Chicken Farmer Song"		5:09
6.	"Underdog"		5:29
7.	"You Don't Know What You've Got"	Hasse Fröberg	2:39
8.	"Slave to Money"		7:30
9.	"A King's Prayer"		6:02
10.	"I Am the Sun - Part Two"		10:48

=== Japanese version ===
The Japanese release contains an additional disc:

No.	Title	Length
1.	"The Meadow"	3:12
2.	"A Good Heart" (Demo)	5:21
3.	"Dream On Dreamer" (Alternative take - Tomas lead vocal)	2:17
4.	"Venus Flytrap"	6:26
5.	"Last Exit"	9:17

== Personnel ==
- Roine Stolt – vocals, guitar, bass guitar
- Tomas Bodin – piano, organ, synthesizer, Mellotron
- Hasse Fröberg – vocals, acoustic guitar
- Jonas Reingold – bass guitar
- Jaime Salazar – drums

with

- Hasse Bruniusson – mallet percussion, vocals
- Ulf Wallander – soprano saxophone
