= Stardust We Are =

Studio album by The Flower Kings
- Released: 11 April 1997
- Recorded: December 1996 – early 1997
- Genre: Progressive rock
- Length: 130:14
- Label: Foxtrot Records
- Producer: Don Azzaro

The Flower Kings chronology
Retropolis (1996)	Stardust We Are (1997)	Scanning the Greenhouse (1998)

Professional ratings
Review scores
Source	Rating
AllMusic	4/5 stars

Stardust We Are is the third studio album by progressive rock band The Flower Kings. The album was released in 11 April 1997. It is the band's first double-CD studio album and includes the epic composition and title track, "Stardust We Are," which has since become one of the band's signature songs.

== Track listing ==
All songs written and composed by Roine Stolt, except where noted.

=== Disc One ===
No.	Title	Writer(s)	Length
1.	"In the Eyes of the World"		10:38
2.	"A Room with a View" (instrumental)	Tomas Bodin	1:26
3.	"Just This Once"		7:54
4.	"Church of Your Heart"		9:10
5.	"Poor Mr. Rain's Ordinary Guitar" (instrumental)		2:44
6.	"The Man Who Walked with Kings" (instrumental)		4:59
7.	"Circus Brimstone" (instrumental)	Bodin, Stolt	12:03
8.	"Crying Clown" (instrumental)	Bodin	0:58
9.	"Compassion" (Actual song length is 4:45; hidden instrumental track follows)		8:40
Total length:			58:32

=== Disc Two ===
No.	Title	Writer(s)	Length
1.	"Pipes of Peace" (instrumental)	Bodin, Stolt	1:19
2.	"The End of Innocence"		8:29
3.	"The Merrygoround"		8:17
4.	"Don of the Universe" (instrumental)		7:02
5.	"A Day at the Mall" (instrumental)	Bodin	0:45
6.	"Different People"		6:19
7.	"Kingdom of Lies"		5:47
8.	"If 28" (instrumental)	Bodin, Stolt	2:15
9.	"Ghost of the Red Cloud"		4:37
10.	"Hotel Nirvana" (instrumental)		1:49
11.	"Stardust We Are"		25:03
Total length:			71:42

== Credits ==
- Roine Stolt – electric & acoustic guitars, lead vocals, keyboards
- Tomas Bodin – Waldorf synthesizer, Hammond organ, Mellotron, piano, pipe organ, Rhodes piano, Optigan, accordion, effects
- Michael Stolt – bass guitar
- Jaime Salazar – drumkit
- Hasse Bruniusson – percussion
- Hasse Fröberg – lead and backing vocals

Guests

- Ulf Wallander – soprano saxophone
- Håkan Almkvist – sitar, tabla

Production

- Hippiefied Art – book
- Stefan Bodin – photography
- Lilian Forsberg – photography
- Dexter Frank Jr. – engineer, mixing
- Per Nordin – photography
- David Palermo – artwork, image design
