= Retropolis =

Studio album by The Flower Kings
- Released: 25 May 1996
- Recorded: December 1995 – March 1996
- Genre: Progressive rock
- Length: 69:16
- Label: Foxtrot Records
- Producer: Don Azzaro

The Flower Kings chronology
| Back in the World of Adventures (1995) | Retropolis (1996) | Stardust We Are (1997) |

Professional ratings
Review scores
| Source | Rating |
|---|---|
| AllMusic | 4/5 stars |
| Progressiveworld.net | link |

Retropolis, released in 1996, is the second studio album by Swedish progressive rock band The Flower Kings (not counting Roine Stolt's 1994 solo album). The album's art is inspired by the film Metropolis.

== Track listing ==
All tracks are written by Roine Stolt, except where noted.

| No. | Title | Writer(s) | Length |
|---|---|---|---|
| 1. | "Rhythm of Life" (instrumental) | Tomas Bodin | 0:32 |
| 2. | "Retropolis" (instrumental) | | 11:07 |
| 3. | "Rhythm of the Sea" | | 6:12 |
| 4. | "There Is More to This World" | | 10:15 |
| 5. | "Romancing the City" (instrumental) | Bodin | 0:57 |
| 6. | "The Melting Pot" (instrumental) | | 5:45 |
| 7. | "Silent Sorrow" | | 7:42 |
| 8. | "The Judas Kiss" | | 7:43 |
| 9. | "Retropolis by Night" (instrumental) | Bodin | 3:18 |
| 10. | "Flora Majora" (instrumental) | | 6:50 |
| 11. | "The Road Back Home" | | 8:55 |

== Credits ==
- Roine Stolt – lead vocals, guitars, additional keyboards
- Tomas Bodin – Hammond C3 organ, piano, Mellotron, synthesizers, effects
- Hasse Bruniusson – percussion, drumkit (10)
- Jaime Salazar – drumkit, percussion
- Michael Stolt – bass guitar

Guests

- Hasse Fröberg – vocals (4, 7)
- Ulf Wallander – soprano saxophone (6, 11)

Production

- Per Aleskog – cover art
- Hippiefied Art (i.e. Roine Stolt) – sleeve design assistant
- DCM – sleeve design assistant
- Lilian Forsberg – photography
- Dexter Frank Jr. (i.e. Roine Stolt) – engineer, mixing
- Tegelmann – photography
