= Hydrophonia =

Studio album by Roine Stolt
- Released: 1998
- Recorded: February – May 1998
- Genre: Progressive rock
- Length: 65:42
- Label: Foxtrot Records
- Producer: Don Azzaro

Roine Stolt chronology
The Flower King (1994)	Hydrophonia (1998)	Wallstreet Voodoo (2005)

Professional ratings
Review scores
Source	Rating
Allmusic	4.5/5 stars

Hydrophonia is an album by Swedish progressive rock guitarist Roine Stolt. The album was released 1998.

== Track listing ==
All songs composed by Roine Stolt.

1. "Cosmic Lodge" – 7:13
2. "Shipbuilding" – 5:51
3. "Little Cottage by the Sea" – 4:55
4. "Wreck of HMS Nemesis" – 11:55
5. "Bizarre Seahorse Sex Attack" – 6:00
6. "Oceanna Baby Dolphin" – 3:26
7. "Nuclear Nemo" – 6:27
8. "Hydrophonia" – 6:11
9. "Lobsterland Groove" – 6:19
10. "Seafood Kitchen Thing" – 9:25

Sources: and

== Personnel ==
- Jaime Salazar – drums, percussion
- Roine Stolt – bass, guitar, keyboards, percussion
- Ulf Wallander – soprano sax

Production

- Don Azzaro – mixing, producer
- Ingemar Bergman, Stefan Bodin, Lilian Forsberg – photography
- Per Nordin – artwork
- Dexter Frank Jr. – engineer

Sources: and
