= Back in the World of Adventures =

Studio album by The Flower Kings
- Released: 25 October 1995
- Recorded: December 1994 – early 1995
- Genre: Progressive rock
- Length: 71:28
- Label: Foxtrot Records
- Producer: Roine Stolt, Don Azzaro

The Flower Kings chronology
Back in the World of Adventures (1995)	Retropolis (1996)

Professional ratings
Review scores
Source	Rating
AllMusic	4/5 stars

Back in the World of Adventures is the first studio album by Swedish progressive rock band The Flower Kings.

== Track listing ==
All tracks are written by Roine Stolt.

No.	Title	Length
1.	"World of Adventures"	13:39
2.	"Atomic Prince/Kaleidoscope" (instrumental)	7:51
3.	"Go West Judas"	7:49
4.	"Train to Nowhere"	3:51
5.	"Oblivion Road" (instrumental)	3:49
6.	"Theme for a Hero" (instrumental)	8:34
7.	"Temple of the Snakes" (instrumental)	1:25
8.	"My Cosmic Lover"	6:48
9.	"The Wonder Wheel" (instrumental)	4:19
10.	"Big Puzzle"	13:34

== Personnel ==
- Roine Stolt – guitars, vocals, keyboards
- Tomas Bodin – Hammond organ, Mellotron, synthesizers, piano, flute
- Michael Stolt – bass
- Jaime Salazar – drums (1–8)
- Hasse Bruniusson – percussion, drums (10)

Guest

- Ulf Wallander – soprano saxophone

== Production ==
- Produced by Roine Stolt and Don Azzaro
- Recorded and engineered by Dexter Frank Jr.
- Mixed by Tomas Bodin and Dexter Frank Jr.
