= Flower Power (The Flower Kings album) =

Studio album by the Flower Kings
- Released: 16 November 1999
- Recorded: June–November 1998
- Studio: Foxtrot Mobile
- Genre: Progressive rock, electronic rock
- Length: 140:40
- Label: Foxtrot Records
- Producer: Don Azzaro

The Flower Kings chronology
Scanning the Greenhouse (1998)	Flower Power (1999)	Alive on Planet Earth (2000)

Professional ratings
Review scores
Source	Rating
Allmusic	3/5 stars

Flower Power is the fourth studio album by the progressive rock band the Flower Kings, which was released in 1999. It is also their second double-CD and includes the nearly one-hour-long epic composition, "Garden of Dreams".

A Japanese edition was released that contained some bonus tracks at the end of each disc.

The album received a 3 out of 5 review from Allmusic, but a positive review from All About Jazz, whose reviewer stated: "If you are a fan of progressive music... no scratch that... if you are a fan of ANY MUSIC, go buy Flower Power right now – it represents the best of positive and intelligent modern music available today".

== Track listing ==
=== Disc One ===
No.	Title	Writer(s)	Length
1.	"Garden of Dreams": I. "Dawn" (instrumental); II. "Simple Song"; III. "Business Vamp"; IV. "All You Can Save"; V. "Attack of the Monster Briefcase" (instrumental); VI. "Mr. Hope Goes to Wall Street" (instrumental); VII. "Did I Tell You?"; VIII. "Garden of Dreams"; IX. "Don't Let the d'Evil In"; X. "Love Is the Word"; XI. "There's No Such Night"; XII. "The Mean Machine" (instrumental); XIII. "Dungeon of the Deep" (instrumental); XIV. "Indian Summer"; XV. "Sunny Lane" (instrumental); XVI. "Gardens Revisited" (instrumental); XVII. "Shadowland" (instrumental); XVIII. "The Final Deal; "	Tomas Bodin, Roine Stolt Bodin Bodin, Stolt Bodin, Stolt Bodin, Stolt Stolt, Bodin Bodin Stolt, Bodin Bodin, Stolt Stolt Stolt, Bodin Stolt, Bodin Bodin, Stolt Bodin Bodin, Stolt Stolt, Bodin Stolt, Bodin Stolt Stolt	59:16 1:33 1:48 5:02 5:02 3:04 1:47 3:46 2:39 3:11 2:49 2:43 2:41 4:24 4:13 5:25 2:56 2:03 4:13
2.	"Captain Capstan" (instrumental)	Stolt	0:45
3.	"IKEA by Night" (instrumental)	Jaime Salazar	0:04
4.	"Astral Dog" (instrumental)	Salazar, Stolt	8:03
5.	"Regal Dinners" (bonus track)	Stolt	3:14
6.	"Papercup Angels" (bonus track)	Stolt	1:50
7.	"Butterfly Queen" (bonus track)	Stolt	1:25
Total length:			74:37

=== Disc Two ===
All tracks are written by Roine Stolt, except where noted.

No.	Title	Writer(s)	Length
1.	"Deaf, Numb & Blind"		11:10
2.	"Stupid Girl"		6:49
3.	"Corruption"		5:54
4.	"Power of Kindness" (instrumental)	Bodin	4:23
5.	"Psychedelic Postcard"		8:42
6.	"Hudson River Sirens Call 1998" (instrumental)		4:47
7.	"Magic Pie"	Hasse Fröberg	8:19
8.	"Painter"		6:45
9.	"Calling Home"		11:19
10.	"Afterlife" (instrumental)	Bodin, Stolt	4:34
11.	"End of a Century" (bonus track)		2:01
Total length:			74:43

== Credits ==
- Roine Stolt – guitars, lead vocals, keyboards
- Tomas Bodin – keyboards
- Hasse Fröberg – vocals
- Michael Stolt – bass guitar
- Jaime Salazar – drumkit & percussion
- Hasse Bruniusson – percussion & odd voices

Production

- Stefan Bodin – photography
- Tomas Bodin – assistant engineer, mixing assistant
- Tomas Eriksson – pre-mastering engineer
- Lilian Forsberg – photography
- Dexter Frank Jr. (i.e. Roine Stolt) – engineer
- Per Nordin – photography
- Roine Stolt – photography
