= Karmakanic =

Swedish rock band

- Origin: Malmö, Sweden
- Genres: Progressive rock; symphonic rock; neo-prog
- Years active: 2002−present
- Labels: Inside Out
- Members: Göran Edman; Jonas Reingold; Krister Jonsson; Lalle Larsson; Morgan Ågren; Nils Erikson
- Website: jonasreingold.se

Karmakanic is a Swedish progressive rock group founded in Malmö in 2002 by bassist and keyboardist Jonas Reingold. They are signed to Inside Out Music.

== Band members ==
- Göran Edman – vocals
- Nils Erikson – vocals, keyboards
- Krister Jonsson – guitars
- Jonas Reingold – bass
- Lalle Larsson – keyboards
- Morgan Ågren – drums

== Discography ==
Studio albums

- Entering the Spectra (2002)
- Wheel of Life (2004)
- Who's the Boss in the Factory? (2008)
- In a Perfect World (2011)
- Dot (2016)
- Transmutation (2025)

Live albums

- Karmakanic & the Agents of Mercy – The Power of Two (2010)
- Live in the US (2014)
