= The Flower Kings =

Swedish progressive rock band

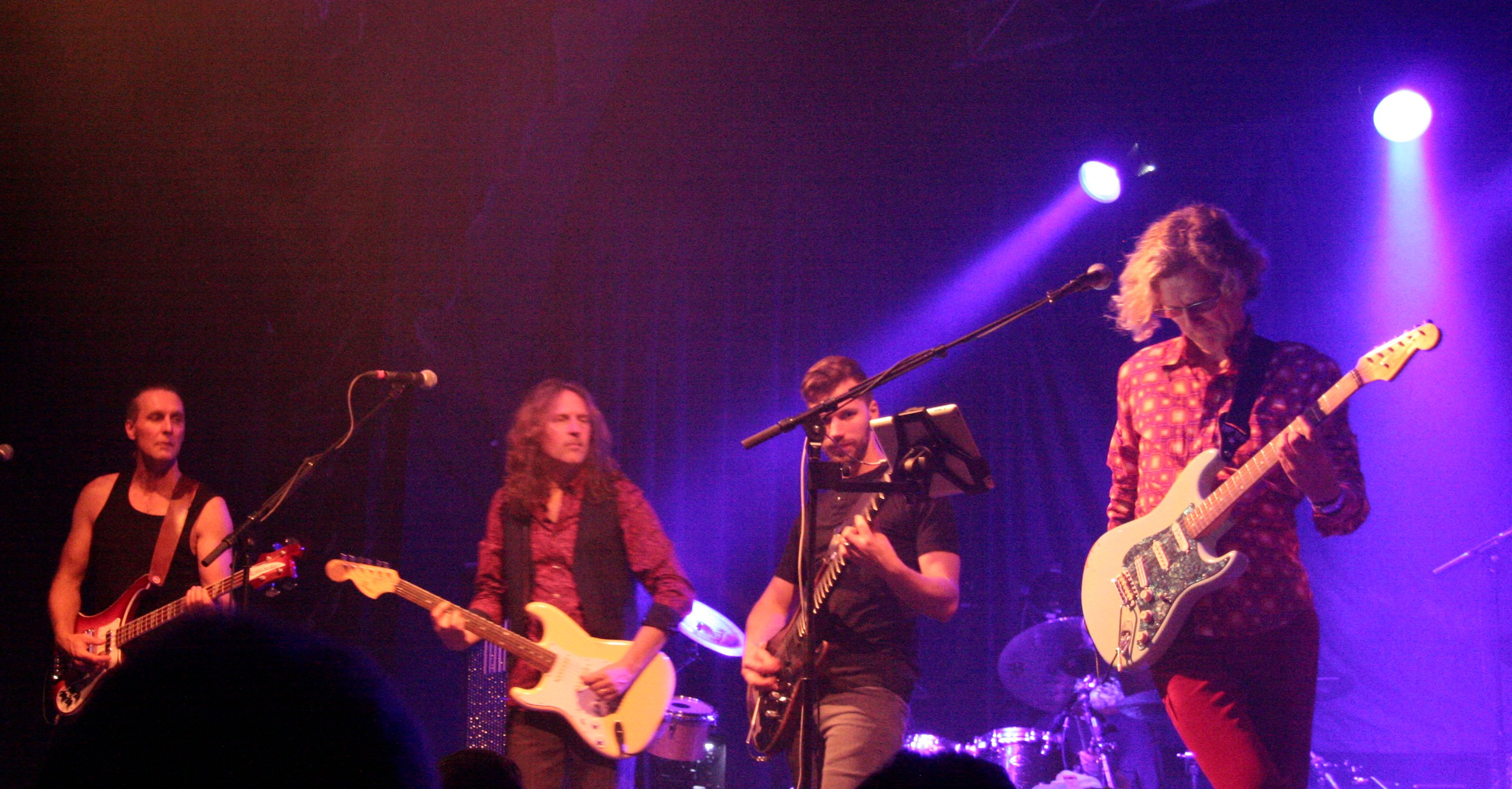
- The Flower Kings performing in 2014

Background information
- Origin: Sweden
- Genre: Progressive rock
- Years active: 1994–2008, 2011–2015, 2018–present
- Labels: Foxtrot; Century Media; Inside Out
- Members: Roine Stolt; Hasse Fröberg; Michael Stolt; Lalle Larsson; Mirko DeMaio
- Past members: Jaime Salazar; Zoltán Csörsz; Daniel Gildenlöw; Marcus Liliequist; Ola Heden; Erik Hammarström; Tomas Bodin; Felix Lehrmann; Jonas Reingold; Zach Kamins
- Website: www.flowerkings.se

The Flower Kings are a Swedish progressive rock band formed in 1994 by guitarist and singer-songwriter Roine Stolt. The group began as Stolt's touring band to support his third solo album The Flower King. They continued performing after the tour and have gone on to become one of the most prolific studio recording units in progressive rock, having released over twenty hours of music spread across eighteen studio albums. Their music is similar to early symphonic progressive rock groups such as Yes, marked by sharp dynamic changes, polyrhythms, heavy bass, vocal harmonies, abstract lyrics, and extended song lengths.

== History ==
=== Formation ===
In early 1993, guitarist and singer Roine Stolt had written material for his third solo album The Flower King and sought musicians to perform it. He had wanted to release a progressive rock-style album for a while and felt the time was right to pursue the project. The album features Stolt on vocals, guitar, bass and keyboards; Jaime Salazar on drums; and Hasse Fröberg on vocals. It was recorded in Sweden between May 1993 and January 1994.

In preparation for Stolt's concert tour to support the album's release, Stolt, Salazar, and Fröberg were joined by Stolt's brother Michael on bass and Tomas Bodin on keyboards. The five performed their first gig on 20 August 1994 at an outdoor festival in Uppsala, Stolt's hometown and the city where The Flower King was recorded. After they decided to become a full-time band, they officially adopted the name The Flower Kings, named after Stolt's album. Stolt had produced a list of potential titles for the record, one of which was "The Flower King", and chose it because of its positive meaning and its reference to the hippie era of the 1960s.

=== Activity ===
After performing a series of concerts through 1994, the band entered the studio in December 1994 to record their debut album, Back in the World of Adventures. The recording process was gradual, finishing in October 1995.

In 2000, Michael Stolt was replaced by Jonas Reingold. Two years later, Salazar was replaced by Zoltán Csörsz. Daniel Gildenlöw of Pain of Salvation joined the band the same year as a multi-instrumentalist and vocalist.

Other contributors have included Hasse Bruniusson (percussion) and Ulf Wallander (saxophone).

Stolt has written the vast majority of the material the band has recorded, with Bodin contributing most of the rest. The music is best described as symphonic progressive rock, bearing a strong resemblance to the music of Yes, King Crimson, Gentle Giant, and early Genesis, with jazz fusion and blues influences. The band's lyrics are almost uniformly positive and uplifting, affirming such values as love, peace, and spirituality, and furthering their association with Yes.

Their 1999 album Flower Power contains the eighteen-section, almost 60-minute "Garden of Dreams".

In June 2007, they released The Road Back Home, a compilation of remixed songs from 1994 to 2006, plus "Little Deceiver" (a previously unreleased track) and the full version of their cover of "The Cinema Show" by Genesis.

Zoltan Csörsz was replaced by new drummer Marcus Liliequist for one album, but returned for the 2007 album, The Sum of No Evil. He was subsequently replaced by Erik Hammarström in 2008.

In 2008, Ola Heden, previously of Reingold's side project Karmakanic, joined on guitar, vocals and keyboards.

In November 2008, the band were the opening act at the Ecco Prog Fest in Moscow.

After touring in 2008, The Flower Kings were inactive for four years. Stolt felt the band had varied levels of focus in their direction and had started to feel lost. They reunited in 2011 to work on new material after Stolt felt it was the right time and sensed eagerness from the other members to work together. This marked the arrival of German drummer Felix Lehrmann. Banks of Eden, the group's eleventh album, was released in June 2012 and was recorded with analogue recording techniques and styles reminiscent of the height of vinyl records. This was followed by Desolation Rose in October 2013.

The lineup of Stolt, Bodin, Reingold, Fröberg and Lehrmann played together for the last time in 2015. 2016 and 2017 saw the band members busy with other engagements.

In December 2017, the first part of a career-spanning box set titled A Kingdom of Colours was released. This first box, with 10 discs, covers the period from 1995 to 2002 and includes the studio albums from Back in the World of Adventures to Unfold the Future. The second box set, titled A Kingdom of Colours 2 and covering the albums Adam and Eve through to Desolation Rose, was released in June 2018.

In September 2018, Stolt announced a new album named Manifesto of an Alchemist. The album did not feature long-time keyboardist Tomas Bodin, and as such, it is credited to "Roine Stolt's The Flower King" rather than "The Flower Kings".

In August of the same year, Roine Stolt presented a new band called "Roine Stolt and friends play The Flower Kings". The band featured Stolt, Fröberg and Reingold with new keyboard player Zach Kamins and new drummer Mirko DeMaio. Roine Stolt stated that he was done being in a group and wanted to tour as a solo artist like Roger Waters or Steven Wilson. Tomas Bodin was not a part of this group and made his displeasure quite public. The band toured with Spock's Beard in November and December 2018 and continued to do shows in 2019, this time under the name "The Flower Kings Revisited".

In July 2019, "Revisited" was removed from the band name, making it clear that this lineup was now "The Flower Kings". The band went on to release the double albums Waiting for Miracles in 2019 and Islands in 2020, the latter having been recorded entirely remotely during the COVID-19 pandemic.

On 24 March 2021, Roine Stolt announced two big projects. The Flower Kings are working on a brand new album "in the same innocence" of Stardust We Are. By the end of 2021, Stolt explained that Jonas Reingold could no longer participate in the touring line-up due to his commitments with Steve Hackett's band, but Reingold still plays some of the songs in the studio.

On January 7, 2022, the band announced their 15th studio album By Royal Decree would be released on 4 March 2022, while also announcing that founding member Michael Stolt returned after more than two decades to contribute bass and vocals, splitting duties with current bassist Jonas Reingold.

During 2022 and 2023, the band's first nine albums all got re-released in remastered and slightly remixed versions, up to and including the album Paradox Hotel.

The 16th studio album, Look at You Now, was announced for an 8 September 2023 release, alongside a European tour about to take place in October 2023. In April 2023, Zach Kamins revealed he left the group due to complicating touring logistics and Daniel Lantz joined for the summer shows. In July, the group mentioned that Lalle Larsson will play for the rest of the upcoming European dates.

The 17th studio album, Love, was released in May 2025.

== Personnel ==
Current members

- Roine Stolt – vocals, guitar, keyboards, bass guitar (1994–present)
- Hasse Fröberg – vocals, guitar, acoustic guitar, tambourine (1994–present)
- Michael Stolt – bass guitar (1994–1999, 2021–present)
- Mirko DeMaio – drums (2018–present)
- Lalle Larsson – keyboards (2023–present)

Former members

- Jaime Salazar – drums (1994–2001)
- Tomas Bodin – keyboards (1994–2015)
- Jonas Reingold – bass (1999–2021)
- Felix Lehrmann – drums (2011–2015)
- Zoltán Csörsz – drums (2002–2004, 2007–2008)
- Daniel Gildenlöw – vocals, guitars, keyboards (2002–2004)
- Marcus Liliequist – drums (2005–2006)
- Zach Kamins – keyboards (2018–2023)

Guest musicians

- Hasse Bruniusson – percussion (1995–present)
- Ulf Wallander – saxophone (1995–present)
- Håkan Almqvist – sitar (1997)
- Pat Mastelotto – drums (2007)
- Erik Hammarström – drums (2008)
- Ola Heden – vocals, keyboards, guitar (2008)
- Aliaksandr Yasinski – accordion (2022)
- Marjana Semkina – vocal (2023)
- Daniel Lantz – keyboards (2023)

== Discography ==
=== Studio albums ===
List of studio albums, with selected chart positions and sales figures
Title	Album details	Peak chart positions						
Title	Album details	SWE	GER	NLD	BEL (WA)	BEL (FL)	SWI	US Heat.
Back in the World of Adventures	Released: 25 October 1995; Label: Foxtrot; Formats: CD, LP	—	—	—	—	—	—	—
Retropolis	Released: 25 May 1996; Label: Foxtrot; Formats: CD	—	—	—	—	—	—	—
Stardust We Are	Released: 11 April 1997; Label: Foxtrot; Formats: CD, LP	—	—	—	—	—	—	—
Flower Power	Released: 16 November 1999; Label: Foxtrot, Inside Out Music; Formats: CD	—	—	—	—	—	—	—
Space Revolver	Released: 4 July 2000; Label: Inside Out Music; Formats: CD	—	—	—	—	—	—	—
The Rainmaker	Released: 18 September 2001; Label: Inside Out Music; Formats: CD	—	—	—	—	—	—	—
Unfold the Future	Released: 5 November 2002; Label: Inside Out Music; Formats: CD, LP	—	—	—	—	—	—	—
Adam & Eve	Released: 3 August 2004; Label: Inside Out Music; Formats: CD	—	—	—	—	—	—	—
Paradox Hotel	Released: 4 April 2006; Label: Inside Out Music; Formats: CD	—	—	—	—	—	—	—
The Sum of No Evil	Released: 25 September 2007; Label: Inside Out Music; Formats: CD	—	—	—	—	—	—	—
Banks of Eden	Released: 19 June 2012; Label: Inside Out Music; Formats: CD, LP, DD	27	68	64	192	—	—	45
Desolation Rose	Released: 29 October 2013; Label: Inside Out Music; Formats: CD, LP, DD	—	92	53	91	187	—	35
Waiting for Miracles	Released: 8 November 2019; Label: Inside Out Music; Formats: CD, LP, DD	—	59	—	84	—	67	—
Islands	Released: 30 October 2020; Label: Inside Out Music; Formats: CD, LP, DD	—	48	—	109	—	92	—
By Royal Decree	Released: 4 March 2022; Label: Inside Out Music; Formats: CD, LP, DD	—	17	53	84	185	23	—
Look at You Now	Released: 8 September 2023; Label: Inside Out Music; Formats: CD, LP, DD	—	49	—	—	—	27	—
Love	Released: 2 May 2025; Label: Inside Out Music; Formats: CD, LP, DD	—	—	—	—	—	57	—
Hope	Released: 23 October 2026; Label: Inside Out Music; Formats: CD, LP, DD	—	—	—	166	—	43	—
"—" denotes a recording that did not chart or was not released in that territory.

Live albums

- Alive on Planet Earth (2000)
- Meet the Flower Kings (2003)
- Instant DeLIVEry (2006)
- Tour Kaputt (2011)
- Live in Europe 2023 (2024)

Official bootlegs

- Édition Limitée Québec (1998)
- Live in New York – Official Bootleg (2002)
- BetchaWannaDanceStoopid!!! (2004)
- Carpe Diem – The Flower Kings Live in USA (2008)

Fan Club albums

- Fan Club 2000 (2000)
- Fan Club 2002 (2002)
- Fan Club 2004 (2004)
- Fan Club 2005 / Harvest (2005)

Compilations

- Scanning the Greenhouse (1998)
- The Road Back Home (2007)

Box sets

- A Kingdom of Colours: The Complete Collection From 1995 to 2002 (2017)
- A Kingdom of Colours II: The Complete Collection From 2004 to 2013 (2018)
