= Jaime Salazar =

Mexican footballer (1931-2011)

Personal information
- Full name: Jaime Salazar Gutiérrez
- Date of birth: 6 February 1931 (age 95)
- Place of birth: Mexico City, Mexico
- Date of death: 14 Mar 2011
- Place of death: Cuernavaca, Morelos, Mexico
- Position: Midfielder

Senior career*
Years	Team	Apps	(Gls)
- Club Necaxa

International career
1956–1957	Mexico	8	(0)
- * Club domestic league appearances and goals

Jaime Salazar Gutiérrez (6 February 1931 – 14 March 2011) was a Mexican professional footballer who played as a midfielder for Mexico in the 1958 FIFA World Cup. He also played for Club Necaxa.
