= Hasse Fröberg =

Swedish rock musician

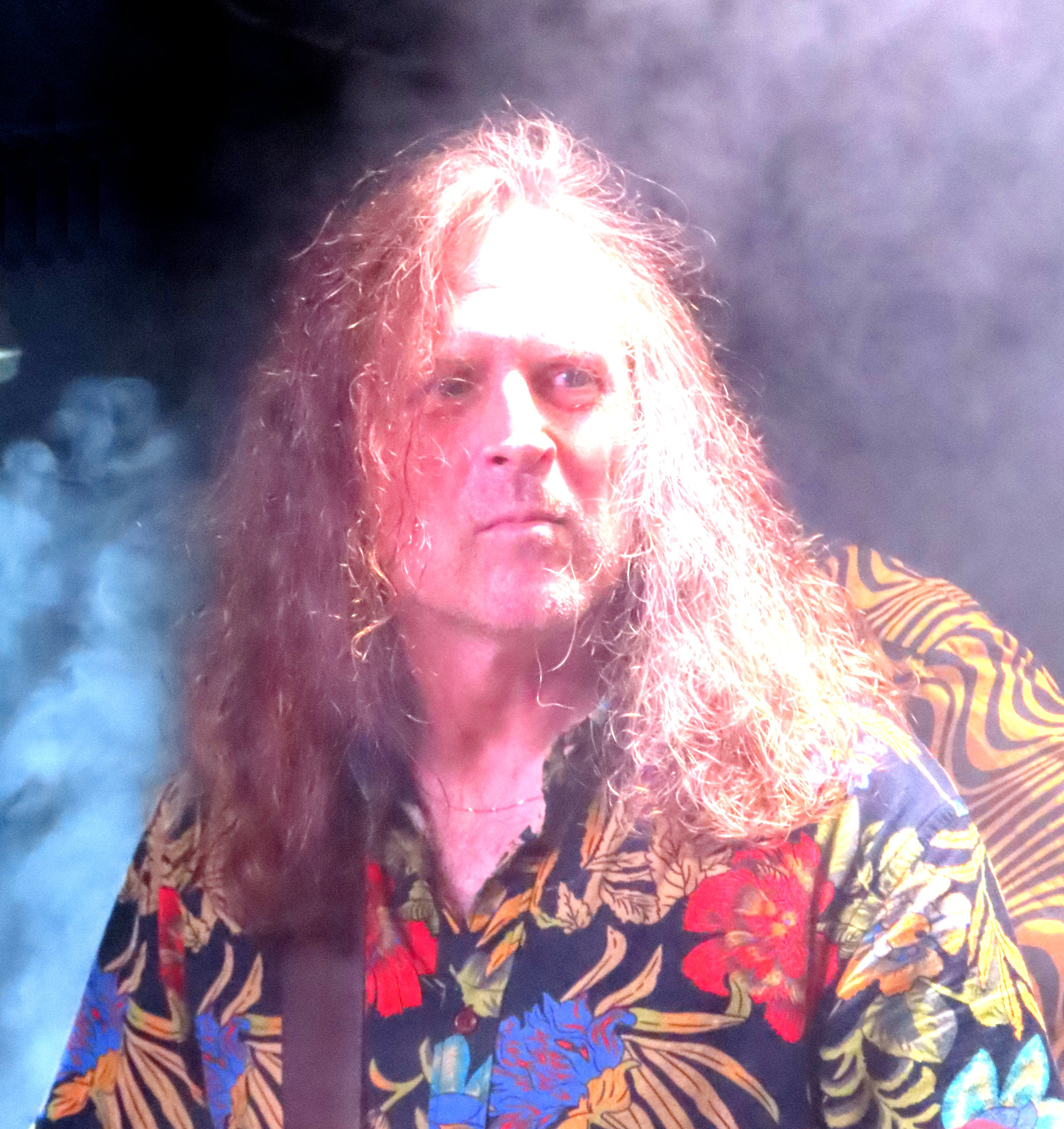
- Fröberg in 2023

Background information
- Born: 4 January 1964 (age 62)
- Genres: Progressive rock, hard rock
- Occupations: Musician, songwriter
- Instruments: Vocals, guitar
- Member of: The Flower Kings, Hasse Fröberg & Musical Companion
- Formerly of: Barrelhouse, Spellbound, Highway Stars, Solid Blue,
- Website: hfmcband.com

Hasse Fröberg (born 4 January 1964) is a Swedish vocalist, guitarist and composer, currently one of the vocalists and guitarists of The Flower Kings. He fronted a handful of hard rock bands before joining them and currently has his own solo project, Hasse Fröberg & Musical Companion.

== Biography ==
Hasse entered the world of music early on with guitar and drum lessons as a child. He formed his first group at the age of 10: a trio in ELP style, at least when it comes to the line-up. It was named HPP3 and it included Fröberg on vocals and guitar, Patric Pettersson on drums and Patric Cohen on keyboards. He began playing in local pop and rock bands at the age of 15.

In 1983 Hasse started the heavy rock band Spellbound. Later on he wrote much of the material together with Guitar player JJ Marsh. They recorded 2 albums "Breaking The Spell" in December 1984 and "Rocking Reckless" in December 1985. The band also recorded material that wasn't released until later as the album "Hidden Treasures" for the Japanese market.

Spellbound disbanded in 1988, and Hasse toured with 1970s comic rockers "Highway Stars" before starting his own group Solid Blue, that toured heavily in Sweden between 1993 and 1995. Foxtrot Records released their CD with the title Volume 3 in October 1994 on which Hasse did most of the writing and sang lead. Hasse is also involved as lead singer and composer in Barrelhouse, a group that follows the hard road of the Zeppelin tradition.

Hasse's involvement in The Flower Kings started in 1994 when he was invited by Roine Stolt to sing a couple of tracks on the album The Flower King that was actually released as a Roine Stolt solo project. After that he guested on the first Flower Kings 'proper' album Back in the World of Adventures in 1995. In the same year during the recording of the double CD Stardust We Are Hasse was invited to be a permanent member of the band. He joined the band on stage for the first time in May 1997, providing back vocals, occasional lead vocals, acoustic guitar, electric guitar, and some percussion. He gradually took a more prominent role in the band and the 1999 album Flower Power included one of his songs, "Magic Pie."

In October 2008, with The Flower Kings taking a break, Hasse decided it was time to form a new band. In his words,"Old fashioned as I am, I don't want it to be like a project, I want a band with a certain sound. The key to that I believe, is to find enthusiastic musicians who love to play my music and are willing to rehearse and to create a unit that really works well together." Thus, Hasse Fröberg & Musical Companion came to be. Members include Kjell Haraldsson (keyboards), Ola Strandberg (drums), Anton Lindsjö (lead guitar) and Thomsson (bass) apart from Fröberg himself on vocals and rhythm guitar. Their first album, Future Past, was released in spring 2010, with the follow-up album, Powerplay being released in 2012. The third release, HFMC, came in 2015.

== Discography ==
=== With Spellbound ===
- Breaking the Spell (1984)
- Rockin Reckless (1985)
- Hidden Treasures

=== With Solid Blue ===
- Volume 3 (1994)

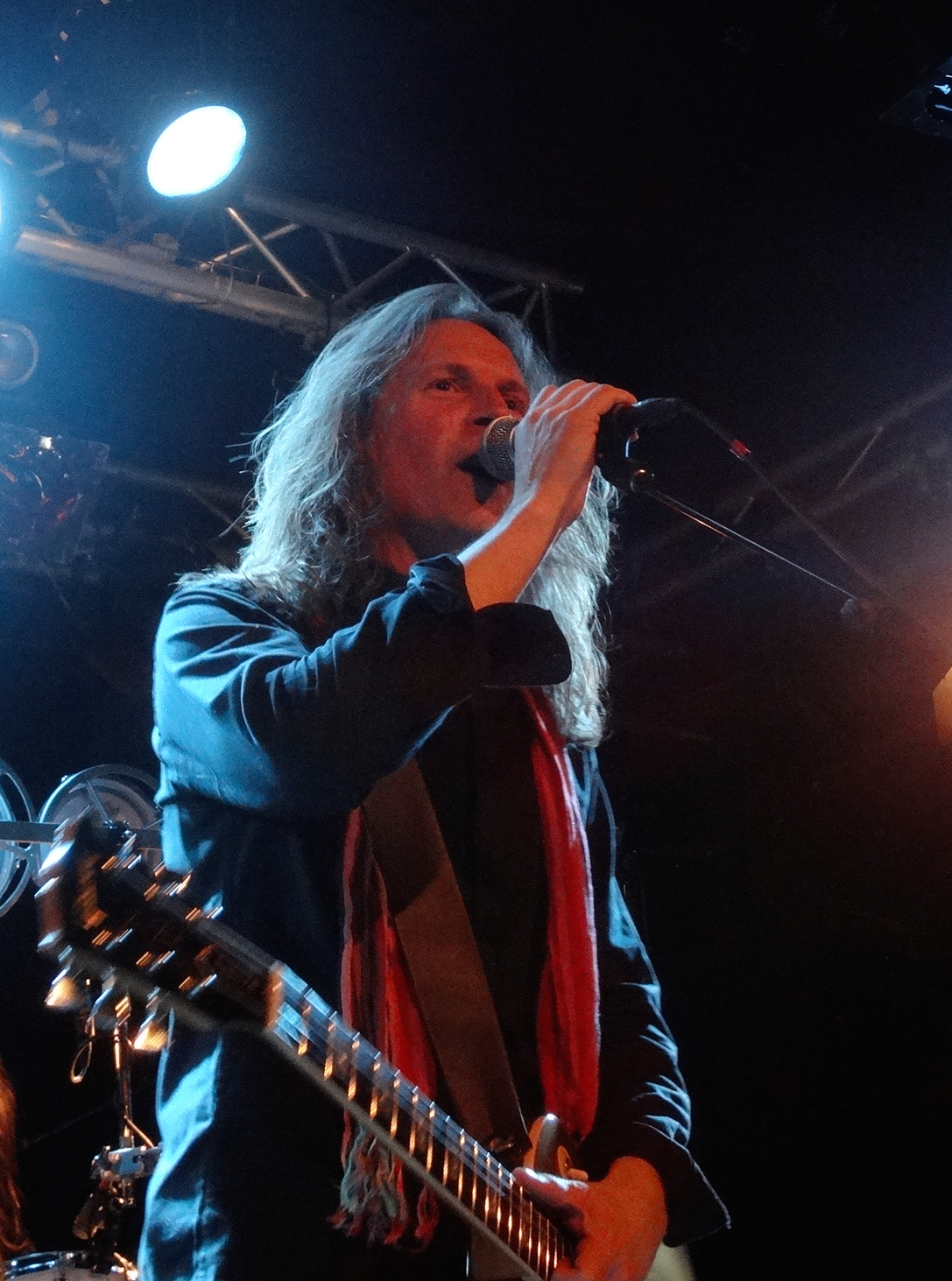
Fröberg in 2015

=== With The Flower Kings ===
- Retropolis (1996)
- Stardust We Are (1997)
- Flower Power (1999)
- Space Revolver (2000)
- The Rainmaker (2001)
- Unfold the Future (2002)
- Adam & Eve (2004)
- Paradox Hotel (2006)
- The Sum of No Evil (2007)
- Banks of Eden (2012)
- Desolation Rose (2013)
- Waiting for Miracles (2019)
- Islands (2020)
- By Royal Decree (2022)
- Look At You Now (2023)
- Love (2025)

=== With Hasse Fröberg & Musical Companion ===
- FuturePast (2010)
- PowerPlay (2012)
- HFMC (2015)
- No Place Like Home - The Concert (2017)
- Parallel Life (2019)
- We Are The Truth (2021)
- Eternal Snapshots (2024)
