= Samla Mammas Manna =

Swedish progressive rock band

- Also known as: SMM, Zamla Mammaz Manna
- Origin: Uppsala, Sweden
- Genres: Progressive rock; Rock in Opposition; avant-prog
- Years active: 1969–1980, 1990–2008
- Label: Silence
- Past members: Lars Hollmer; Lars Krantz; Hasse Bruniusson; Coste Apetrea; Tatsuya Yoshida; Henrik Öberg "Bebben"; Eino Haapala; Vilgot Hansson

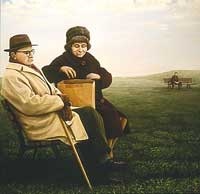
The sleeve to the record Måltid

Samla Mammas Manna (also known as Zamla Mammaz Manna) was a Swedish progressive rock band often characterized by virtuosic musicianship, circus references and silly humour, similar in many ways to the song-writing style of Frank Zappa. They were one of the founding members of the Rock in Opposition (RIO) movement in the late 1970s. In 1979 they were Fred Frith's backing band on his solo album, Gravity (1980). Musically, they bore a resemblance to the Canterbury scene.

The original line-up was Lars Hollmer (keyboards), Hasse Bruniusson (drums), Lars Krantz (bass) and Henrik Öberg (percussion). For Måltid, guitarist Coste Apetrea joined the group.

They were on the fringe of the Swedish political "progg" movement, although their lyrics were humorous and not explicitly political. The title of the album Klossa Knapitatet is a play on the Swedish phrase krossa kapitalet, a common slogan in the 1970s that means "crush the capital", and also the title of a seminal progg song by Blå Tåget, called "Staten och Kapitalet (Den ena handen vet vad den andra gör)". Some more serious elements of the progg movement were not amused by this frivolous attitude.

They spent a significant part of the 70s touring in Sweden, but also in other European countries.

The band underwent line-up and name changes over the years, reinventing their sound each time. In 1977, Apetrea was replaced by guitarist Eino Haapala, and the band changed their name to Zamla Mammaz Manna. The band split in 1980, but Hollmer and Haapala continued as part of a spin-off group under the name von Zamla. In 1999, the band reformed under their original name for a one-off release entitled Kaka. In 2002 they reunited again, this time with Japanese musician Tatsuya Yoshida on drums, for some performances and their final album Dear Mamma. The band played their first concerts in the US in August 2003, in Chicago at Schuba's, and at the annual Progday festival in North Carolina.

In 2005 the band opened the international progressive rock festival that took place in Moscow, Russia, InProg 2005.

Hollmer died in December 2008.

== Musical style ==
The musical style of Samla Mammas Manna has been described as a fusion of progressive rock and various national folk styles. This being the result of complex rhythms using instruments not commonly used in the rock genre including the marimba, bouzouki, veena, and accordion.

Having no direct political stand, being neither "a traditional Swedish folk group" nor, "a leftist folk-rock band" as stated by Andrew Jones in his book Plunderphonics, Pataphysics & Pop Mechanics: An Introduction to Musique Actuelle, they freely weaved in and out of the styles of both groups creating their own unique sound.

== Members ==
- Lars Hollmer – keyboards, accordion, vocals (1969–1980, 1990–2008)
- Lars Krantz – bass, vocals (1969–1980, 1990–2008)
- Hasse Bruniusson – drums, percussion, vocals (1969–1980, 1990–1999)
- Henrik "Bebben" Öberg – percussion (1969–1971)
- Coste Apetrea – guitar, vocals (1972–1976, 1990–2008)
- Eino Haapala – guitar, vocals (1972–1980)
- Vilgot Hansson – drums (1980)
- Tatsuya Yoshida – drums (2002–2008)

== Discography ==
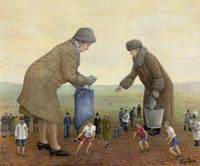
The sleeve to the record Dear Mamma

as Samla Mammas Manna

- Samla Mammas Manna (1971)
- Måltid (1973)
- Klossa Knapitatet (1974)
- Snorungarnas symfoni (1976) (with Greg FitzPatrick)
- Kaka (1999)
- Dear Mamma (live) (2002)

as Zamla Mammaz Manna

- För äldre nybegynnare (1977)
- Schlagerns mystik (1978)
- Familjesprickor (1980)

as von Zamla

- Zamlaranamma (1982)
- No Make Up! (1984)
- ... 1983 (live) (1999)

== See also ==
- Romantic Warriors II: A Progressive Music Saga About Rock in Opposition
