= Jonas Reingold =

Swedish bassist (born 1969)

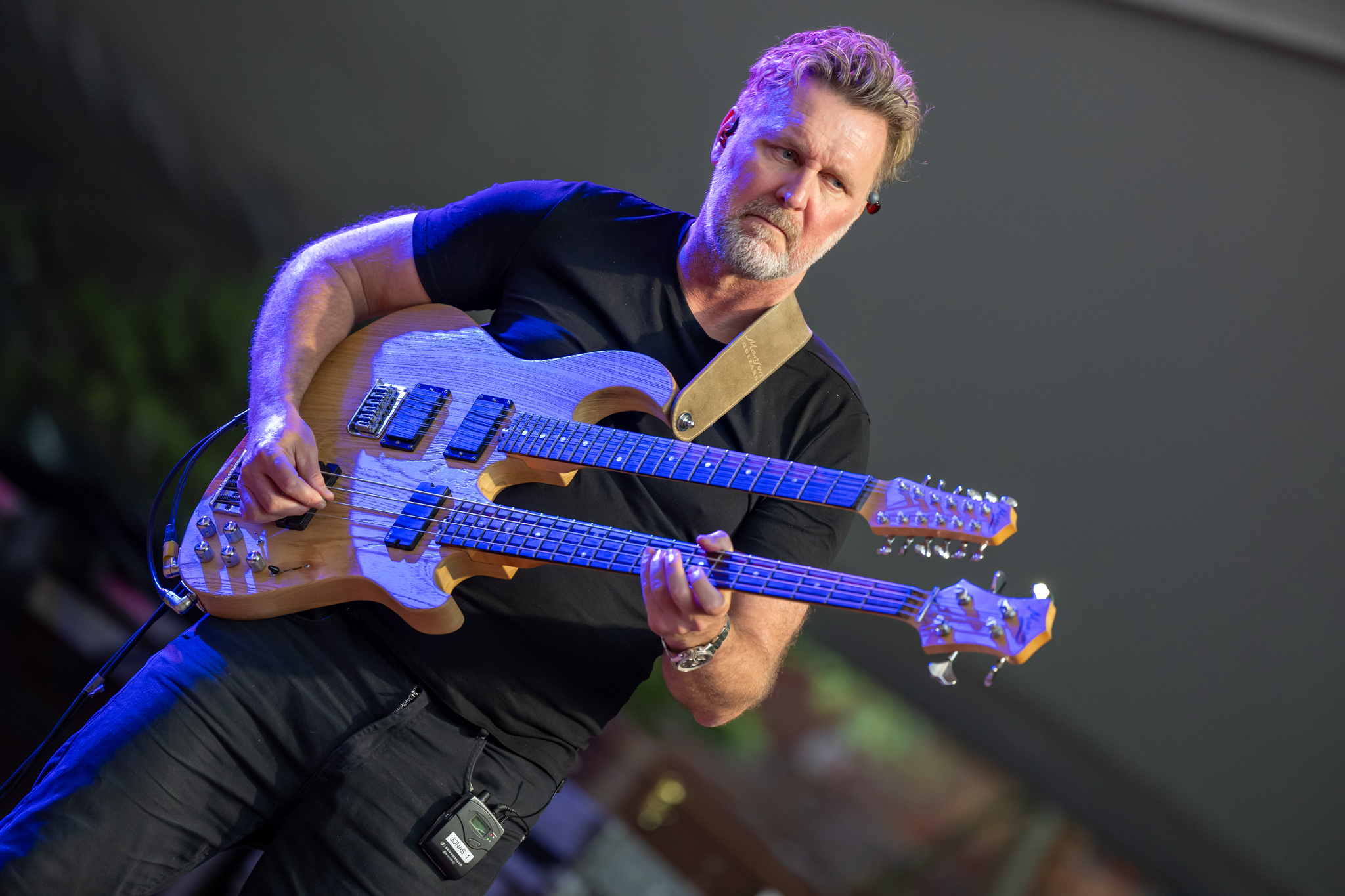
- Reingold performing with Steve Hackett in 2024

Background information
- Born: 22 April 1969 (age 56)
- Genres: Heavy metal, progressive rock
- Occupations: Musician, producer
- Instrument: Bass
- Years active: 1986–present
- Member of: Kaipa, The Sea Within, The Tangent, Steve Hackett Band, Karmakanic, The Fringe, Opus Atlantica
- Formerly of: The Flower Kings, Agents of Mercy, Time Requiem
- Website: jonasreingold.se

Jonas Reingold (born 22 April 1969) is a Swedish bass guitarist from Malmö.

== Biography ==
Reingold started to play bass in 1986 when he subbed for a friend in the locally-famous act WIRE. The band was happy with his performance and offered him the spot. From 1988 until 1994, he studied music and achieved a master's degree of fine arts in 1994.

Busy working as a session player between 1994 and 1996 he finally released his debut album as a band leader in 1995, which was called Sweden Bass Orchestra. It was a bass big band consisting of 5 bass players and a drummer. They also had a guest performance by Niels-Henning Ørsted Pedersen on the disc. Between 1996 and 1999, Reingold was busy recording with various artists and different projects, such as Midnight Sun, Reingold, Sand and Gold, and others.

Reingold has also contributed to songwriting for the Swedish metal group The Poodles. He has been credited for one song on each of their albums, (except for Sweet Trade for which he co-wrote three tracks). He has co-written: "Metal Will Stand Tall", "Streets of Fire", "Seven Seas", "Reach the Sky", "I Rule the Night" and "Father to a Son". His contributions have become some of the most recognized songs by the band.

In 1999 he started to work with The Flower Kings, replacing Michael Stolt who moved on to other projects; he has remained a permanent member in the group. In 2000, Reingold joined Stolt's other band, Kaipa, where he also went on to become a permanent member.

In 2002, Reingold founded his own band, Karmakanic. He also joined Opus Atlantica for the release their self-titled debut album; he later the same year played with Time Requiem.

In 2003, Reingold became a member of the progressive rock band, The Tangent.

Reingold played bass as special guest on the Musea/Colossus release: Dante's Inferno with Hungarian progressive rock band Yesterdays. This concept CD was released in December 2008.

Reingold also played bass on An Endless Sporadic's self-titled full-length album An Endless Sporadic which was produced by long-time collaborator Roine Stolt of The Flower Kings and Transatlantic.

In 2009, Reingold was recruited yet again by fellow Flower King member, Roine Stolt, to join a new band, Agents of Mercy where he played bass on three albums.

Also in 2009, Reingold founded his own record label, Reingold Records, under which he has released albums from a number of his various projects.

In 2015, Reingold played bass on Nad Sylvan's solo album, Courting the Widow. This working relationship would continue through Sylvan's next three solo albums.

In 2016, Reingold joined up with drummer Nick D'Virgilio and vocalist/guitarist, Randy McStine, to form a rock trio, The Fringe. They released a self-titled debut album.

In 2017, Reingold co-formed the supergroup The Sea Within and released a self-titled debut album in June 2018.

In 2020, Nick D'Virgilio asked Jonas to play bass on his new solo album, Invisible.

Reingold has been touring with acclaimed guitarist Steve Hackett since 2019 on his UK, European and North American tours and is featured on the ensuing live albums.
