= Roine Stolt =

Swedish musician (born 1956)

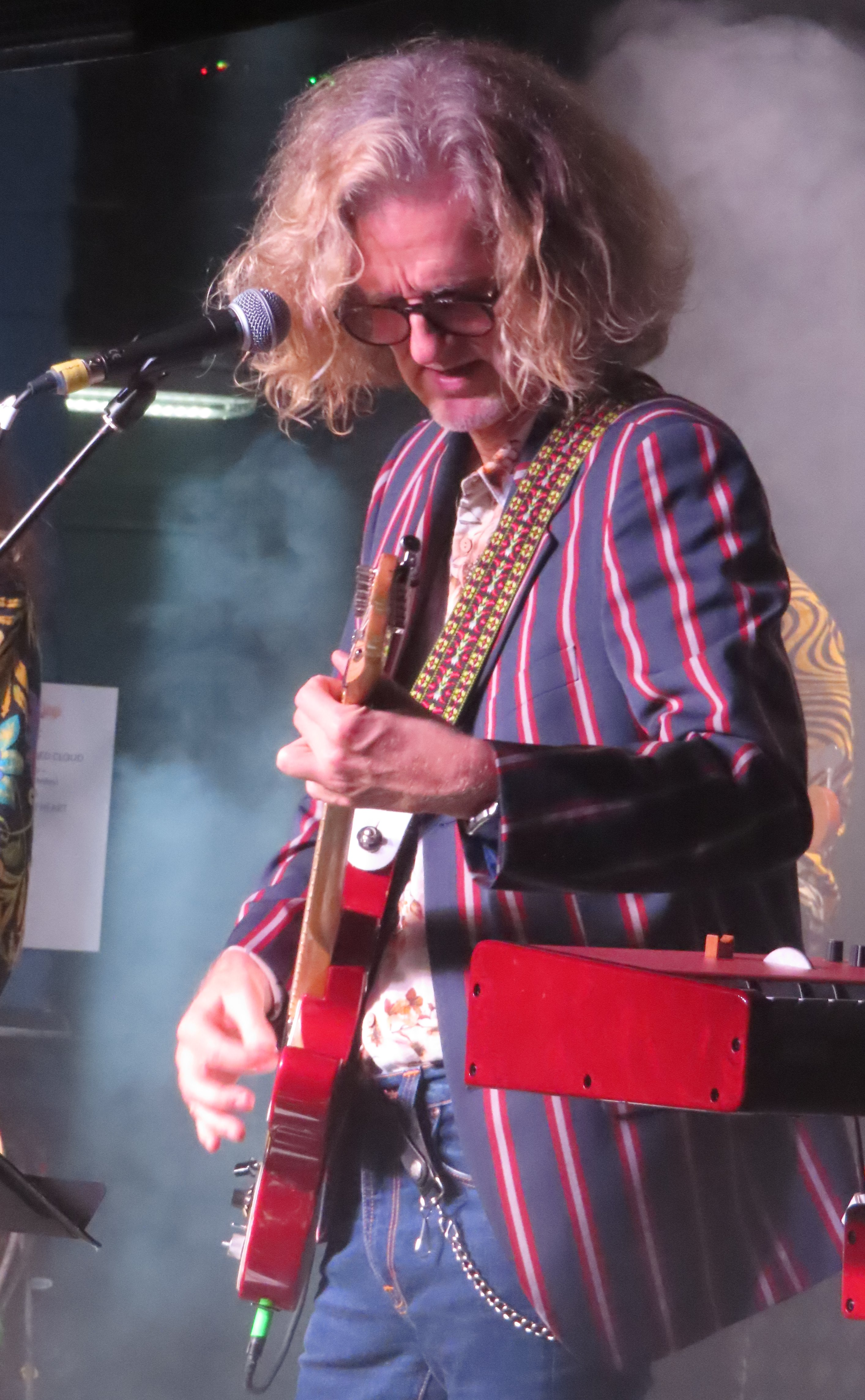
- Stolt in 2023

Background information
- Also known as: Don Azzaro
- Born: 5 September 1956 (age 68); Uppsala, Sweden
- Genres: Progressive rock, jazz rock
- Occupations: Musician; singer; composer; producer
- Instruments: Vocals; guitar; bass; keyboards
- Years active: 1973–present
- Labels: Foxtrot Music
- Member of: The Flower Kings; Transatlantic; Agents of Mercy; The Sea Within
- Formerly of: Kaipa; The Tangent; 3rd World Electric; Anderson/Stolt; Steve Hackett band
- Website: flowerkings.se

Roine Stolt (born 5 September 1956) is a Swedish guitarist, vocalist and composer. A major figure in Sweden's rock history, Stolt led two of his country's most successful progressive rock bands: Kaipa in the 1970s and The Flower Kings in the 1990s onward. In the same vein as frequent collaborator Steven Wilson, Stolt has regularly collaborated with other progressive rock musicians; he has made a guest appearance on several modern progressive rock albums, and multiple progressive rock supergroups include him as a member.

== Biography ==
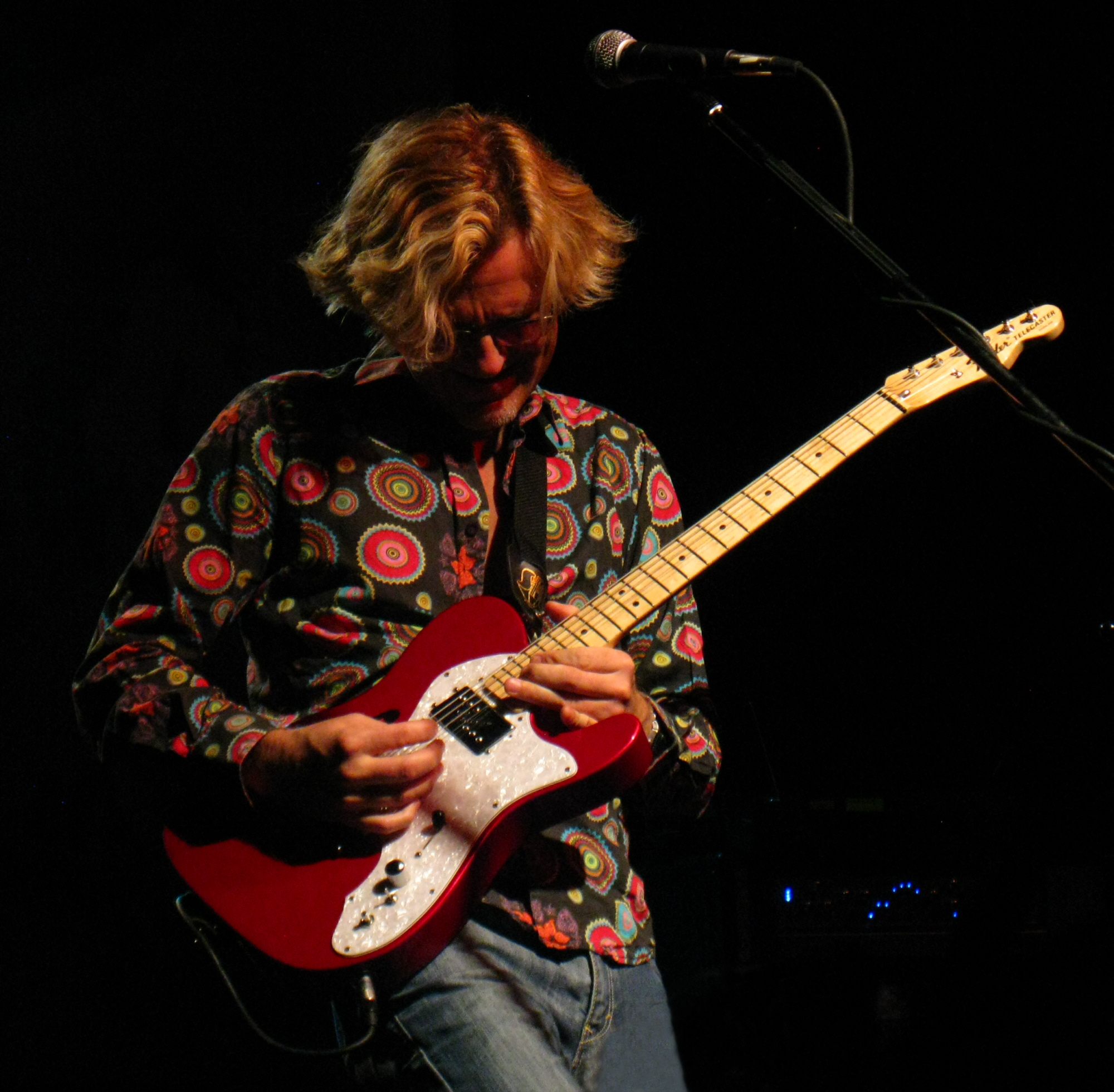
Stolt on tour with Transatlantic (2010)

Stolt started his career in the late 1960s playing bass guitar in local rock bands. He switched to guitar in 1973 in his brief sojourn with Allman Brothers-influenced Orexis. In 1974 he became the guitarist in Kaipa, a professional progressive rock band. He was 17 years old at that time. The group made three successful albums and toured more than 100 gigs a year, including national TV and radio performances in Scandinavia.

In 1979 he left Kaipa to form his own group Fantasia and made two albums. The group split up in 1983, and Stolt started working as a solo and session musician, arranger and producer.

It was at this point I felt I had really learned to master the guitar that my career as singer started on the 1985 album "Behind The Walls", which was a melodic and romantic album more in the style of Jackson Browne or Hall & Oates.

— Roine Stolt on The Flower Kings website

In the late 80s he started his own publishing and recording label called Foxtrot Music. He was also involved in various projects including live performances and recording sessions with other artists, in styles ranging from symphonic rock towards more traditional rock, funk, pop, folk, blues and jazz. Under the "Stolt" project he released "The Lonely Heartbeat" in 1989: the sound is a mix of pop and complex rock.

Witnessing the progressive rock revival of the 1990s, a movement that partly originated from Sweden with bands like Landberk and Änglagård, Roine Stolt was quick to come back to his early love. Recruiting ex-Jonas Hellborg drummer Jaime Salazar and ex-Samla Mammas Manna percussionist Hasse Bruniusson, he released The Flower King in mid-August 1994. Stimulated by the warm response, he enlisted brother Michael Stolt (bass, vocals) and longtime friend Tomas Bodin (keyboards) and formed the Flower Kings, which would remain his principal musical project for years to come.

It was an album that tried to unleash the forces of good in the negative, violent, aggressive, competitive music business of today. Reinstate the old hippie ideals, lyrically and musically.

— Roine Stolt on The Flower King, from The Flower Kings website

In 1998 he released his second solo album Hydrophonia. This reveals major influences by early progressive musicians such as Frank Zappa and Steve Howe.

In the year, 2000 Stolt worked in two different projects: the supergroup Transatlantic, and the re-launch of Kaipa, where he was involved in three albums from 2002–2005. He re-entered the studio with Transatlantic in 2009, for an album release later in the year.

In 2013, Stolt and The Flower Kings joined Neal Morse for a co-headlining tour. The members of both bands collaborated for an encore consisting of Transatlantic songs, as 3 of the 4 members of Transatlantic were present (Roine Stolt, Neal Morse, and Mike Portnoy).

In 2015 Stolt joined Steve Hackett's touring band as bassist and guitarist for Hackett's Acolyte to Wolflight with Genesis Revisited Tour.

On 24 June 2016, the duo Stolt and Jon Anderson had formed released their debut studio album entitled Invention of Knowledge.

In 2017, Stolt co-formed the supergroup The Sea Within.

== Family ==
Stolt and his wife Lilian have two sons, Johan Sebastian and Peter Gabriel, named after two of his all-time musical idols.
