= Per Nilsson (guitarist) =

Swedish guitarist and producer

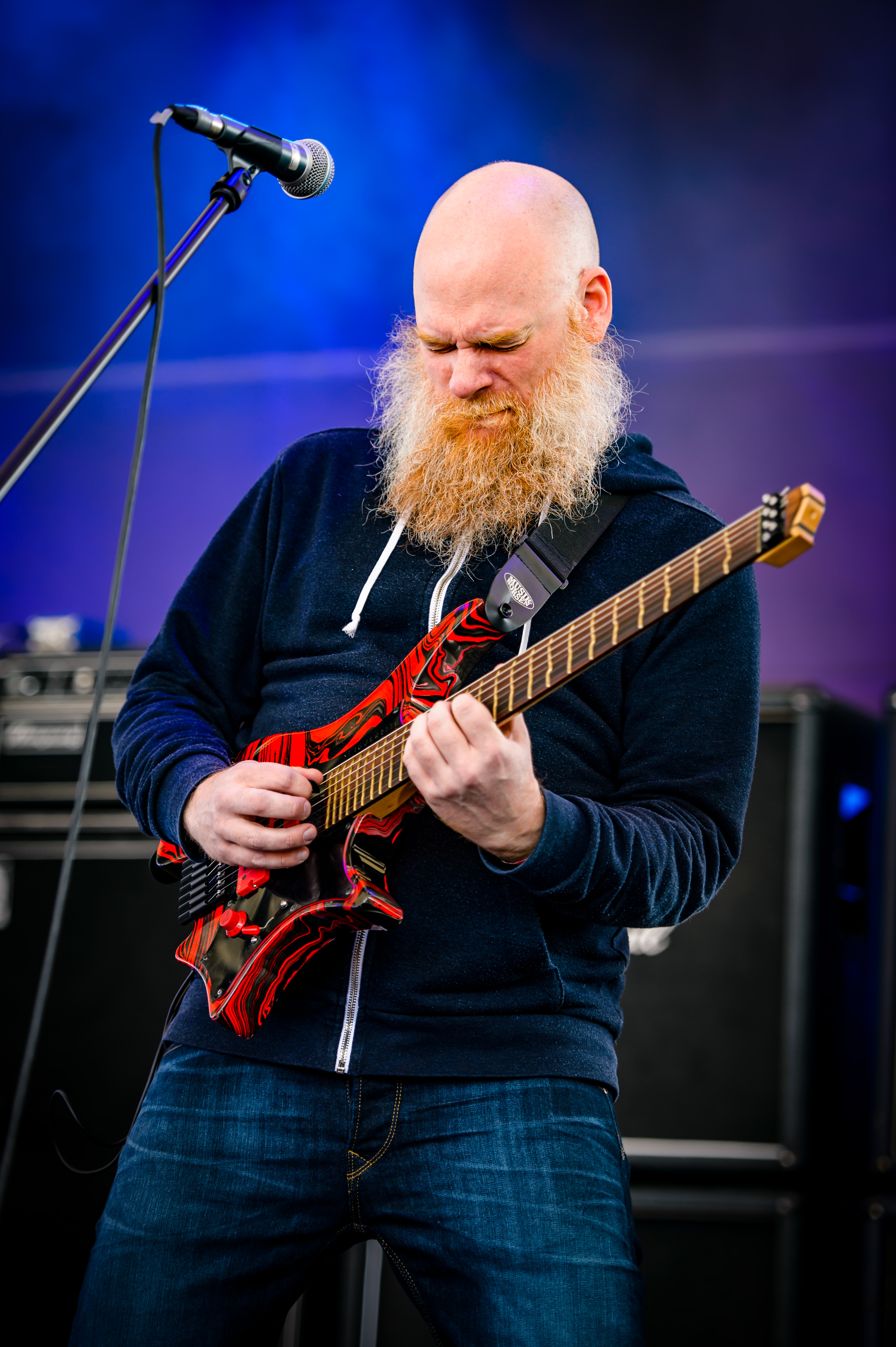
- Nilsson with Nocturnal Rites in 2018

Background information
- Origin: Sweden
- Genres: Melodic death metal, death metal, thrash metal, progressive metal, progressive rock, neoclassical metal, groove metal, power metal,
- Occupations: Musician, producer
- Instruments: Guitar, keyboard, vocals
- Website: www.facebook.com/scarguitar

Per Nilsson (born 5 March 1974) is a Swedish guitarist and record producer. He is best known as one of the founding members of the melodic death metal band Scar Symmetry and for being the touring lead guitarist for Meshuggah during Fredrik Thordendal's 2017-2021 hiatus. He is also the guitarist for Swedish progressive rock group Kaipa and since 2017 he is the lead guitarist for Swedish power metal band Nocturnal Rites.

In January 2013, Guitar Messenger released a guitar instructional DVD with Nilsson called Scar Guitar.

Until 2013, he was endorsed by Ibanez Guitars. He is now endorsed by Strandberg Guitars, who in collaboration with him has created the Strandberg Singularity, his first signature guitar. The first version of the Singularity - a seven string guitar with a red and black swirl finish - was released in 2014. In 2021, a new updated Singularity was released in both seven and eight string versions, with the swirl finish abandoned in favor of a sandblasted ash top with a red and black (seven string version) or blue and black (eight string version) color scheme.

Nilsson primarily plays extended range guitars, though he has often used an Ibanez JEM 6 string to record his solos in the past.

Nilsson is a member of the high IQ society Mensa International, his IQ being "135 or higher" on the Wechsler scale (which translates to 156 or higher on the Cattell scale).

== Discography ==
=== Per Nilsson (solo project) ===
- Blast Radius single (2024)
- Always single (2025)

=== Scar Symmetry ===
- Symmetric in Design (2005)
- Pitch Black Progress (2006)
- Holographic Universe (2008)
- Dark Matter Dimensions (2009)
- The Unseen Empire (2011)
- The Singularity (Phase I – Neohumanity) (2014)
- The Singularity (Phase II – Xenotaph) (2023)

=== Nocturnal Rites ===
- Phoenix (2017)

=== Kaipa ===
- Angling Feelings (2007)
- In the Wake of Evolution (2010)
- Vittjar (2012)
- Sattyg (2014)
- Children of the Sounds (2017)
- Urskog (2022)
- Sommargryningsljus (2024)

=== Nicklas Brännström ===
- Circle of Silence (2020)

=== Zierler ===
- ESC (2015)

=== Hagen ===
- Corridors Of Time (2001)

=== Altered Aeon ===
- Dispiritism (2004)

=== World Below ===
- Maelstrom (2005)

=== The Absence ===
- Oceans (digital single) (2013)

=== Guitar Messenger ===
- Per Nilsson's SCAR GUITAR instructional DVD (2013)

=== As a producer and/or mixing engineer ===
- Zonaria – "Infamy and the Breed" (2007) - as producer
- Zonaria – "Arrival of the Red Sun" (2012) – guitars production
- Sonic Syndicate – "Burn This City" (2009) – vocals production
- Royal Jester – "Night Is Young" (2010) – as producer
- Propane Headrush – "Ignite" (2011) – as producer
- Propane Headrush – "Three" (2014) – as producer, mixing and mastering engineer
- Christian Muenzner – "Beyond the Wall of Sleep" (2014) – as co-producer, mixing and mastering engineer
- Scar Symmetry – "Dark Matter Dimensions" (2009) – as co-producer
- Scar Symmetry – "The Unseen Empire" (2011) – as co-producer
- Scar Symmetry – "The Singularity (Phase I – Neohumanity)" (2014) – as producer, mixing and mastering engineer
- Scar Symmetry – "The Singularity (Phase II – Xenotaph)" (2023) – as producer, mixing and mastering engineer
- Terminal Function – "Clockwork Sky" (2015) – as mixing and mastering engineer
- Eternity's End – "The Fire Within" (2016) – as co-producer, mixing and mastering engineer
- Danny Tunker – "Bare Trap" (2016) – as mixing and mastering engineer
- Beyond the Katakomb – "Beyond the Katakomb" (2018) – as songwriter, producer, mixing and mastering engineer
- Apocalypse Orchestra – "The End is Nigh" (2017) – as mixing and mastering engineer
- Disdained – "Dark Passenger" (2017) – as co-producer, mixing and mastering engineer
- Bloodshot Dawn – "Reanimation" (2017) – as co-producer, mixing and mastering engineer
- Nicklas Brännström – "Circle of Silence" (2020) as co-producer, mixing and mastering engineer

=== As a guest musician ===
On lead guitar, if nothing else's stated

- Tales of a Holy Quest (The Storyteller) – "Seed of Lies" (2003)
- De Fluff (Bootcut) – "Soul P.D." (2006)
- Warnaments (Torchbearer) – all songs (2006) – keyboards
- Riders of the Plague (The Absence) – "The Murder" (2007)
- By Honour (Ereb Altor) – "By Honour" (2008)
- Silent Ruins (Isole) – "Dark Clouds" (2009)
- Reveal No Secrets (Loch Vostok) – "Thirty Years" (2009)
- Off the Face of the Earth (Fuelblooded) – "The Cult of Ego" (2009)
- Timewarp (Christian Muenzner) – "Wastelands" (2011)
- New World Order single (Threat Signal) – "New World Order" (2011)
- State of the Art (XorigiN) - "Matters of the Heart" (2011)
- Equilibrium (God Forbid) – "Awakening" (2012)
- Furor Incarnatus (Feared) – "Breathing Failure" (2013)
- Dark Legacy (The Storyteller) – "Uninvited Guest" (2013)
- Everything Beautiful (Akeldama) – "Everything Beautiful" (2013)
- Bilo 3.0 (David Maxim Micic) – "Wrinkle Maze" (2013)
- Fire Meets Ice (Ereb Altor) – "Helheimsfärd" (2013)
- Shred Alliance (Wayne Calford) – "Return to Tabernacle" (2014)
- The Radial Covenant (Hannes Grossmann) – "The Radial Covenant" (2014)
- Cult of Indifference (System Divide) – "The Tribulation of Man" (2014)
- Transcendence (Fred Brum) – "Wanderer" (2014)
- Demons (Bloodshot Dawn) – "The Image Faded" (2014)
- Dead Man's Town (Harvest Sun) – "Follow Your Destiny" and "Tall Rider" (2014) – electric guitar and lap steel
- Beyond the Wall of Sleep (Christian Muenzner) – several tracks (2014) – keyboards
- When All Else Fails EP (Carnal Forge) – "Bleed For Me" (2014)
- Burning Heart single (Eshtadur) – "Burning Heart" (2014)
- Our Dying Sun (The Francesco Artusato Project) – "Omega" (2014)
- Destroy the Light (Thorns of Sin) – "The Truth Awakening" (2015)
- Journey to the Stars (Widek) - "Canis Majoris" (2015)
- Ghost Ship Octavius (Ghost Ship Octavius) – "Sea Storm" (2015)
- The Human Affliction (Paul Wardingham) – "Burning Chrome" (2015)
- Plagued (Works of Flesh) – "Hex of Departure" (2015)
- Music Kit for Counter-Strike: Global Offensive (Skog) – "II - headshot" (2015)
- Clockwork Sky (Terminal Function) – "Inside The Quadrant" (2015) - choir vocals
- Trinidad Scorpion Hallucinations (Jeff Hughell) – "The Other Side" (2016)
- Fenris (Khasm) – "Nightwatch" (2016)
- The Fire Within (Eternity's End) – several songs (2016) - backing vocals, synth solo, additional keyboards
- Bare Trap single (Danny Tunker) – "Bare Trap" (2016) - keyboards
- The Crypts of Sleep (Hannes Grossmann) - "The Crypts of Sleep" (2016)
- Nautilus EP (The Silence) - "Spectre" (2016)
- Origins (Mutiny Within) - "Silent Weapons" (2017)
- Dark Passenger single (Disdained) – "Dark Passenger" (2017) - keyboards, backing vocals
- In a World of Fear (Scale the Summit) – "Goddess Gate" (2017)
- Vengeance and The Misery single (Unveil the Strength) – "Vengeance and The Misery" (2017)
- All of Creation (Al Joseph) – "Ocean Levels" (2017)
- En Välsignad Man (Simon Ådahl) – "Mera Rock'n'Roll" (2017)
- Observables (ANYWHEREDOOR) – "TechTrip" (2021) – guitars, keyboards, vocals
