= Morgan Ågren =

Swedish drummer (born 1967)

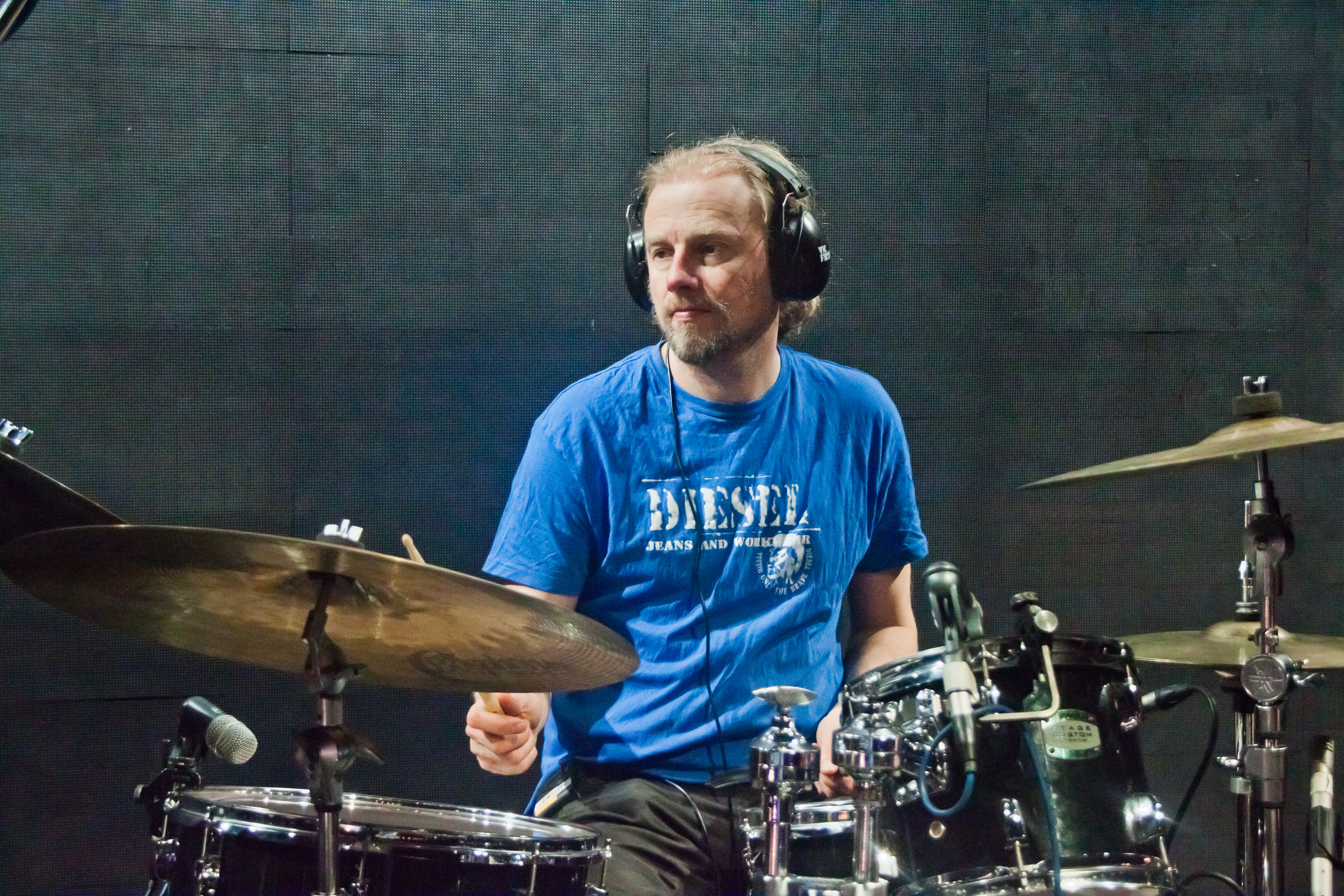
- Ågren in 2017

Background information
- Born: 13 July 1967 (age 59); Umeå, Sweden
- Genres: Progressive rock; progressive metal; jazz fusion
- Occupation: Drummer
- Years active: 1974–present
- Formerly of: Kaipa

Morgan Ågren (born 1967) is a Swedish drummer, and a former member of the progressive rock band Kaipa.

== Biography ==
A native of Umeå, Västerbotten, Ågren began playing drums at a young age, eventually joining forces with Mats Öberg in 1981. Together they formed "Zappsteetoot" in 1984, a band known for performing Frank Zappa's music. Ågren later shared the drummer's seat with Terry Bozzio on Dweezil and Ahmet Zappa's band AZ/DZ's album Shampoohorn.

In 1996, Ågren toured throughout Europe as a member of Glenn Hughes's band, and later to Japan in 1997. 1996 also saw the formation of Morgan Ågren's own record label, Ultimate Audio Entertainment, dedicated to the release of "new" music.

Ågren has recorded several albums as a member of Fleshquartet (Swedish: Fläskkvartetten), among them What's Your Pleasure? and the Grammy Award-winning Goodbye Sweden in addition to his international performances with Zappa's Universe and with Mats Öberg in Mats/Morgan Band.

Ågren was also the drummer in the Swedish prog band Kaipa since 2002, having recorded several albums with the band.

In May 1997, Ågren was featured in a unique project of the Swedish Film Institute, making his debut in movie theaters and at several international film festivals. Described as a sound experience, the 4-minute 35 mm short-film Lullaby for Lost Souls showcases him in "a free-form Stereo Dolby drum explosion".

Ågren is also highly recognized by fans of extreme and heavy music for his studio performance on Fredrik Thordendal's solo album, Sol Niger Within, released in 1997.

He is the subject of a 2013 two-hour documentary directed by Carl King a.k.a. Sir Millard Mulch, called Morgan Ågren's Conundrum: A Percussive Misadventure. It also features Devin Townsend, Dweezil Zappa, and Brendon Small, creator of Metalocalypse.

Ågren was also featured on the eponymous album by Casualties of Cool.

== Discography ==
=== Solo ===
- 2015 – Batterie Deluxe
- 2016 – Through the Eyes of a Morgchestra

=== Mats/Morgan Band ===
- 1996 – Trends and Other Diseases
- 1997 – The Music or the Money
- 1998 – Radio DaDa
- 1998 – The Teenage Tapes
- 2001 – Live
- 2002 – On Air with Guests
- 2005 – Thanks for Flying with Us
- 2008 – Heat Beats Live (+ Tourbook 1991–2007) (DVD+CD)
- 2014 – Schack Tati
- 2016 – 35th Anniversary Collection
- 2018 – Live with Norrlandsoperan Symphony Orchestra

=== Kaipa ===
- Notes from the Past (2002)
- Keyholder (2003)
- Mindrevolutions (2005)
- Angling Feelings (2007)
- In the Wake of Evolution (2010)
- Vittjar (2012)
- Sattyg (2014)
- Children of the Sounds (2017)

=== With other artists ===
- 1987 – Chinese Garden — Cabazz
- 1990 – Far Away — Cabazz
- 1988 – What's Your Pleasure? – Fläskkvartetten
- 1990 – Goodbye Sweden — Fläskkvartetten
- 1993 – Open Your Eyes — Agamon
- 1993 – Zappa's Universe — various artists
- 1993 – Flow — Fläskkvartetten
- 1994 – Shampoohorn — Dweezil & Ahmet Zappa
- 1995 – The Zombie Hunter (APM) — Simon Steensland
- 1996 – The Music of Captain Beefheart – Live — various artists
- 1997 – Spare Parts — Denny Walley
- 1997 – Sol Niger Within — Fredrik Thordendal's Special Defects
- 1999 – Led Circus — Simon Steensland
- 2000 – Automatic — Dweezil Zappa
- 2001 – Glass Finger Ghost — Jimmy Ågren
- 2003 – Close Enough for Jazz — Jimmy Ågren
- 2011 – BLIXT — Morgan Ågren, Raoul Björkenheim & Bill Laswell
- 2012 – Live in the US - Karmakanic
- 2013 – Freak Guitar: The Smorgasbord – Mattias IA Eklundh
- 2013 – Into the Void of Fear – Octopus
- 2014 – Casualties of Cool – Devin Townsend
- 2016 – DOT - Karmakanic
- 2019 – Empath – Devin Townsend
- 2019 – Zëss – Magma
- 2019 – Requiem – Evan Marien & Fredrik Thordendal
- 2020 – Of the Sky – Hassan Iqbal
- 2023 – Layers – Anatole Muster (feat. Hadrien Feraud & Morgan Ågren)
- 2026 – Rosendals Garden – Yelena Eckemoff feat. Svante Henryson
