= The Decca Years (Kaipa album) =

Compilation album by Kaipa
- Released: 2005
- Recorded: 1975–1978
- Label: Decca

The Decca Years is a compilation of the three first albums from the Swedish group Kaipa, released under the Decca label during the years of 1975 to 1978. It also includes two previously unreleased albums.

== Containing albums ==
- Kaipa (1975)
- Inget Nytt Under Solen (1976)
- Solo (1978)
- Live (Previously Unreleased)
- 1974 Unedited Master Demo Recording (Previously Unreleased)
