= Jonas Kjellgren =

Swedish musician

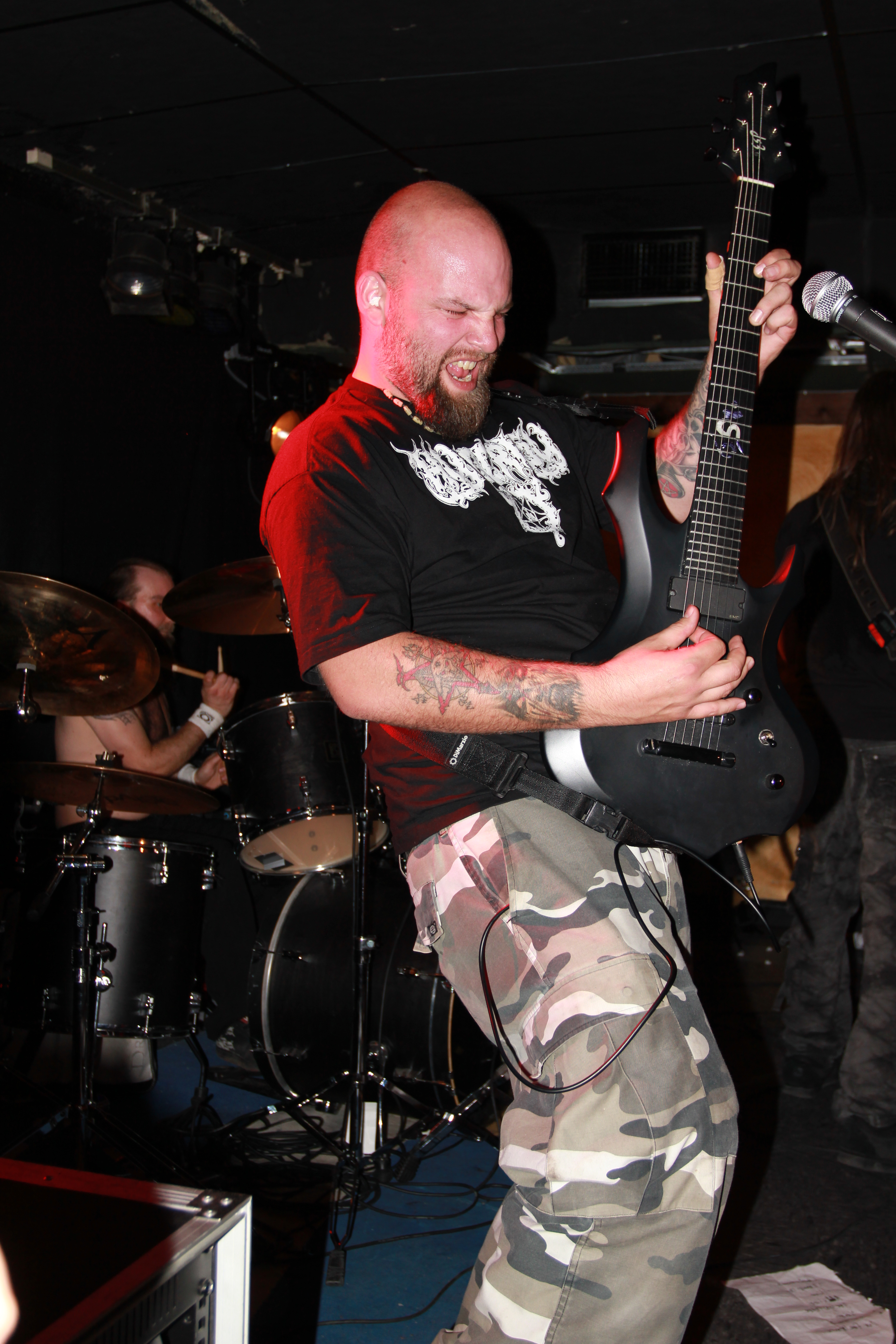
- Kjellgren in 2011

Background information
- Born: Per Jonas Kjellgren; 4 July 1977 (age 49); Sweden
- Genres: Melodic death metal, death metal, thrash metal, industrial metal, power metal, country, country rock
- Occupations: Musician, record producer
- Instruments: Guitar, bass, vocals

Jonas Kjellgren (born 4 July 1977) is a Swedish musician and producer, now residing in Grangärde. He has been lead vocalist for Carnal Forge and Dellamorte, played guitar for Centinex, and played bass for October Tide. He is most famous for being the former co-founder and guitarist of Scar Symmetry, founded in 2005. As a producer, he has worked with bands such as Sonic Syndicate, Zonaria, Steel Attack, 21Lucifers, Darzamat and The Absence. He owns and operates Black Lounge Studios, which many Swedish metal bands use to record, mix and master their albums, although most of his own production efforts are done at The Abyss, which is owned by Peter Tägtgren. Kjellgren is known for playing seven-string guitars.

== Bands ==
Current

- Raubtier – bass
- Bourbon Boys – guitar, backing vocals
- Roadhouse Diet – vocals, guitar
- Ironmaster – guitar, bass
- Nekrodawn – vocales, guitar

Former

- Scar Symmetry – guitars, keyboards
- Carnal Forge – vocals
- Dellamorte – vocals, guitar, harmonica, percussion

== Discography ==
With The Absence

- Riders of the Plague (2007)

With Carnal Forge

- Sweet Bride demo (1997)
- Who's Gonna Burn (1998)
- Firedemon (2000)
- Please... Die! (2001)
- The More You Suffer (2003)
- Aren't You Dead Yet? (2004)

With Darzamat

- Solfernus' Path (2009)

With Scar Symmetry

- Seeds of Rebellion demo (2004)
- Symmetric in Design (2005)
- Pitch Black Progress (2006)
- Holographic Universe (2008)
- Dark Matter Dimensions (2009)
- The Unseen Empire (2011)

With Sonic Syndicate

- Only Inhuman (2007)
- Love and Other Disasters (2008)

With Steel Attack

- Diabolic Symphony (2006)

With Immortal

- All Shall Fall (2009)

With Katatonia

- Tonight's Music (2001)
  - The Black Sessions (Tonight's Music, disc 1 & 2) (2005)

With Zonaria

- Arrival of the Red Sun (2012)

With 21Lucifers

- In the Name of... (2006)
