= Dark Matter Dimensions =

Studio album by Scar Symmetry
- Released: 2 October 2009
- Genre: Melodic death metal
- Length: 53:21
- Label: Nuclear Blast
- Producer: Jonas Kjellgren

Scar Symmetry chronology
Holographic Universe (2008)	Dark Matter Dimensions (2009)	The Unseen Empire (2011)

Singles from Dark Matter Dimensions
- 1. "The Consciousness Eaters" Released: 16 August 2009; 2. "Noumenon and Phenomenon" Released: 19 September 2009; 3. "Ascension Chamber" Released: 1 December 2009; 4. "The Iconoclast" Released: 6 May 2010

Professional ratings
Review scores
Source	Rating
Allmusic	4/5 stars
Sputnikmusic	3.5/4 stars

Dark Matter Dimensions is the fourth studio album by Swedish melodic death metal band Scar Symmetry. It is the first album to feature new vocalists Roberth Karlsson and Lars Palmqvist after Christian Älvestam's departure. It was released on 2 October 2009 in Europe and on 20 October 2009 in North America.

According to drummer and lyricist Henrik Ohlsson, the title Dark Matter Dimensions refers to the "appreciation and acknowledgement of the unseen worlds and dimensions, because without the existence of these unseen forces our physical universe would never be able to exist".

Critics noted that while newcomers Karlsson and Palmqvist's vocals could not quite match the ability of Älvestam's, they did not detract from the album's quality; with BBC Music commenting that they had the "ability to overlap", adding "further depth to the complex, aggressive melodies that Scar Symmetry fans have come to expect". Music videos were created for "Noumenon and Phenomenon", "Ascension Chamber" and "The Iconoclast".

== Track listing ==
All lyrics are written by Henrik Ohlsson; all music is composed by Jonas Kjellgren and Per Nilsson.

No.	Title	Length
1.	"The Iconoclast"	5:07
2.	"The Consciousness Eaters"	4:42
3.	"Noumenon and Phenomenon"	4:13
4.	"Ascension Chamber"	3:48
5.	"Mechanical Soul Cybernetics"	3:27
6.	"Nonhuman Era"	4:45
7.	"Dark Matter Dimensions"	4:12
8.	"Sculptor Void"	5:23
9.	"A Parenthesis in Eternity"	4:43
10.	"Frequencyshifter"	3:15
11.	"Radiant Strain"	4:15

Limited edition; Digipak bonus track
No.	Title	Length
12.	"Pariah"	5:22

Japanese bonus track
No.	Title	Length
13.	"The Consciousness Eaters" (Edit version)	3:58
Total length:		53:21

== Music videos ==
In early September 2009 a video was filmed for the song "Noumenon & Phenomenon" with director Maurice Swinkels (of the Dutch metal band Legion of the Damned). Swinkels had previously produced the band's music video for "The Illusionist". Drummer Henrik Ohlsson stated that the video for "Noumenon & Phenomenon" was shot in Sweden; both in a photo studio and also an abandoned mental hospital.

In December 2009 a music video was released for "Ascension Chamber". Regarding the song, guitarist Per Nilsson states "a spiritual entity that originates from the sun travels through the solar system, destination: the earth. That's the basic concept of the song 'Ascension Chamber'. So when we decided to do a video for it, we knew we had to set it in space!". The video was shot on 25 October 2009, with director Ronny Hemlin, before the band went on the Neckbreakers Ball tour, where the song was played on all nights of the tour.

On 5 May 2010 Scar Symmetry released a music video for "The Iconoclast". The video, which was directed by French photographer Denis Goria, includes appearances by Peter Tägtgren (of Hypocrisy and the musical project Pain) and Martin Stahl (of Silent Lane). Goria had previously performed work on Hypocrisy's music video for "Weed Out the Weak" and Pain's "Monkey Business".

== Personnel ==
Scar Symmetry

- Roberth Karlsson – growl vocals
- Lars Palmqvist – clean vocals
- Jonas Kjellgren – guitar, keyboards
- Per Nilsson – guitar
- Kenneth Seil – bass guitar
- Henrik Ohlsson – drums

== Release history ==
Country	Release date
Europe	2 October 2009
North America	20 October 2009
