= The Final Demand =

Studio album by Asperity
- Released: 15 March 2004
- Genre: Melodic power metal
- Length: 45:58
- Label: Arise Records

The Final Demand is the first and only album released by Swedish melodic power metal band Asperity. It came out in 2004 on Arise Records.

== The band ==
Asperity was formed by Petri Kuusisto and Stefan Westerberg of Carnal Forge and In Thy Dreams. The new band signed with Arise Records. Lars Lindén, also of Carnal Forge and In Thy Dreams, created the artwork for The Final Demand.

== Reception ==
Norway's Scream Magazine gave a mediocre 3 out of 6 rating, reasoning that Asperity "absolutely were not able" to create something new within their genre. Fans of melodic power metal would like The Final Demand, but there were "a couple of dozen releases that are better than this one", and Asperity "do not seem to have worked particularly hard in coming up with something that has not been done a thousand times before".

Vampster opined that Asperity "feature driving, sometimes slightly intricate guitar riffs that are catchy and perfectly acceptable for a debut album". The choruses were on the other hand "overly catchy", "often venture into hard rock-like territory" and caused "schmaltz" to "drip from the speakers". The reviewer hoped for this "schmaltz" to be reduced on the next album. Powermetal.de commended the singer's "very good voice" as well as the "really solid" musical performance "with minimal keyboards, but plenty of guitars, powerful drums, anad no melody rip-offs from Hellovarius". At the same time, there was average songwriting, with Asperity "slavishly" following a similar mid-tempo formula throughout. Except for three tracks, the songs therefore "sink into mediocrity". All in all, Asperity was a "superfluous side project" that "nobody needs".

== Track listing ==
1. "Will They Come" – 4:47
2. "Pleasure and Pain" – 4:45
3. "The Pray" – 5:05
4. "Soul Collector" – 4:22
5. "I'll Never Understand" – 4:24
6. "Final Demand" – 4:34
7. "The Man with 1,000 Faces" – 4:14
8. "Past Life" – 4:24
9. "Rebellion" – 5:19
10. "My Sad Eyes" – 4:04

== Personnel ==
- Peter Kronberg – vocals, bass
- Johan Jalonen Penn – guitars
- Petri Kuusisto – guitars
- Stefan Westerberg – drums
