= Notes from the Past =

Notes from the Past may refer to:

- Notes from the Past a compilation by Taking Back Sunday, 2007
- Notes from the Past (Kaipa album), 2002
