= Terminal Function =

Terminal Function was a Swedish technical death metal band, also called djent.

The band was founded in Sandviken in 1998.

Their debut album Measuring the Abstract came out on Willowtip Records in November 2008. Metal.de got an "extremely positive" first impression. The music was "highly creative, playful, and above all: incredibly diverse". It was however very demanding of the listener, requiring at least "ten listens to grasp the idea behind the song". Therefore, listeners who were not used to this genre were advised to "try something a little simpler". The score was 7 out of 10. Similarly, Vampster commended "their ability to blend diverse elements, levels of heaviness, and guitar solos is nonetheless breathtaking". Measuring the Abstract was "definitely" a good fit for "fans of intricate, experimental music". Rock Hard only gave it 6 out of 10, whereas Scream Magazine gave it 4 out of 6. The reviewer recommended to lessen the use of melodic synth, adding that the band also needed a "real killer tune".

The synth was less used in the production of Terminal Function's second album, Clockwork Sky issued on Willowtip Records on 18 September 2015. It was mixed by Per Nilsson of Scar Symmetry. This time, Scream's reviewer was somewhat impressed by the "most progressive and head-over-heels" song parts. Still, the result was "a tad too chaotic, simply too much of a good thing". The score was again 4 out of 6.

Terminal Function's third album was 2024's The Symbiont.

Guitarist Stefan Aronsson also played in Baron Bane.
