= Holmgang =

Duel practiced by early medieval Scandinavians

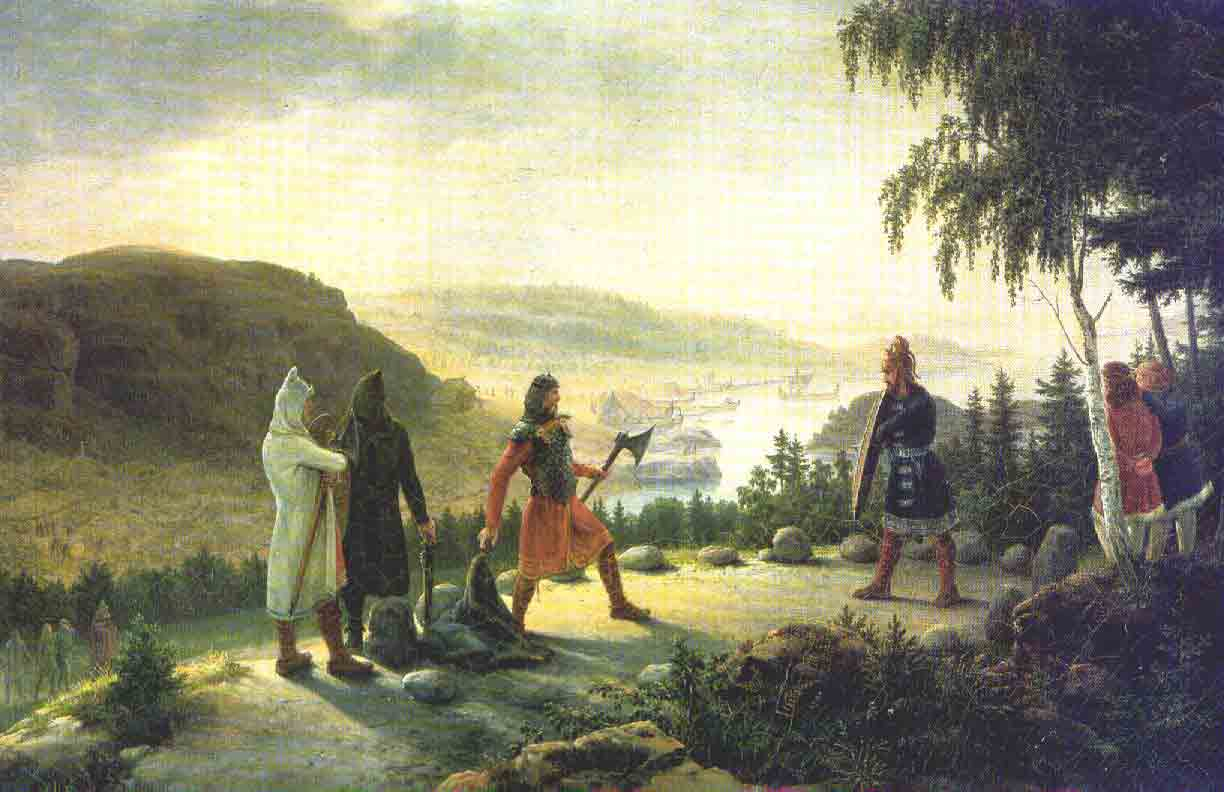
Egill Skallagrímsson engaging in holmgang with Berg-Önundr, painting by Johannes Flintoe

Holmgang (Old Norse: holmganga, Icelandic: hólmganga, Danish and Norwegian: holmgang, Swedish: holmgång) is a duel practiced by early medieval Scandinavians. It was a legally recognized way to settle disputes.

The name holmgang (literally "holm-going") may derive from the combatants' dueling on a small island, or holm, as they do in the saga of Egill Skallagrímsson, alternatively figuratively in reference to an arena.

At least in theory, anyone offended could challenge the other party to holmgang regardless of their differences in social status. This could be a matter of honor, ownership or property, demand of restitution or debt, legal disagreement or intention to help a wife or relative or avenge a friend.

Holmgangs were fought 3–7 days after the challenge. If the person challenged did not turn up for the holmgang, the other man was considered just in his challenge. If the offended party did not turn up for the holmgang, they were deemed niðingr, and could have been sentenced to outlawry. In effect, if someone was unwilling or unable to defend their claim, they had no honor. Sometimes a capable warrior volunteered to fight in the place of a clearly outclassed friend.

Holmgangs do not seem to have been limited to one-on-one duels, but instead could feature many combatants on each side, as long as the numbers were equal.

The 13th-century Västgötalagen (Westrogothic law), is a fragment from an unknown late Viking Age law document from Västergötland, Sweden, which stipulates the conditions for a type of judicial duel, either referring to holmgang or einvigi (trial by combat):

If someone speaks insults to another man ("You're not the like of a man, and not a man in your chest!" – "I'm a man like you!"), they shall meet where three roads meet. If he who has spoken comes and not the insulted one, then he shall be as he's been called: no right to swear oaths, no right to bear witness, may it concern man or woman.

If the insulted one comes and not he who has spoken, then he shall cry "Niðingr!" three times and make a mark in the ground, and he is worse who spoke what he dared not keep.

Now both meet fully armed: if the insulted one falls, the compensation is half a weregild; if he who has spoken falls, insults are the worst, the tongue the head's bane, he shall lie in a field of no compensation.

Exact rules varied from place to place and changed over time, but before each challenge the duelists agreed on the rules. The duel was fought either on a pre-specified plot or at a traditional place which was regularly used for this purpose. The challenger recited the rules, traditional or those agreed upon, before the duel. Rules determined the allowed weapons, who was eligible to strike first, what constituted a defeat or forfeiture, and what the winner received; in Norway, the winner could claim everything the loser owned. Egils saga Skallagrímssonar 1975 (as cited in the Viking Lady Answer Page) recounted:

If a man challenged another in any matter and the one who had issued the challenge won the victory, then his due as victor was whatever the challenge had been made for. If he were defeated, he was obliged to ransom himself by an agreed sum. But if he fell in the duel, the fight lost him all his possessions, and the one who had killed him in the duel inherited from him.

How many times the challenged actually gave in beforehand is unrecorded.

First holmgangs probably ended on the death or incapacitation of one combatant. Killing an opponent did not constitute a murder and therefore did not lead to outlawry or payment of weregeld. Later rules moved holmgang in a more ritualistic direction.

Kormakssaga states that the holmgang was fought on an ox hide or cloak with sides that were 3 metres (9.8 ft) long. It was staked on the ground with stakes used just for that purpose and placed in a specific manner now unknown. After that the area was marked by drawing three borders around the square hide, each about 1 foot (0.30 m) from the previous one. Corners of the outermost border were marked with hazel staves. Combatants had to fight inside these borders. Stepping out of borders meant forfeiture, running away meant cowardice.

There is a hint in Kormakssaga about the sacrifice of a bull before a holmgang, whose hide was stretched and affixed to the ground on which the fight was to take place; but there are many references about the sacrifice the winner made after the victory. Combatants were permitted a specific number of shields (usually three) they could use – the opponent's strikes could break a shield. The challenged would strike first and then the combatants would hit each other in turn. The combat would normally end on the first blood and the winner would receive three marks of silver. This represents mainly the later Icelandic version of holmgang, which was intended to avoid unnecessary loss of life and excessive profiteering; unless the dispute was about a specific property, the most the winner could receive was the three marks of silver.

Professional duelists used holmgangs as a form of legalized robbery; they could claim rights to land, women, or property, and then prove their claims in the duel at the expense of the legitimate owner. Many sagas describe berserks who abused holmgang in this way. In large part due to such practices, holmgangs were outlawed in Iceland in 1006, as a result of the duel between Gunnlaugr Ormstunga and Hrafn Önundarson, and in Norway in 1014.

== In popular culture ==
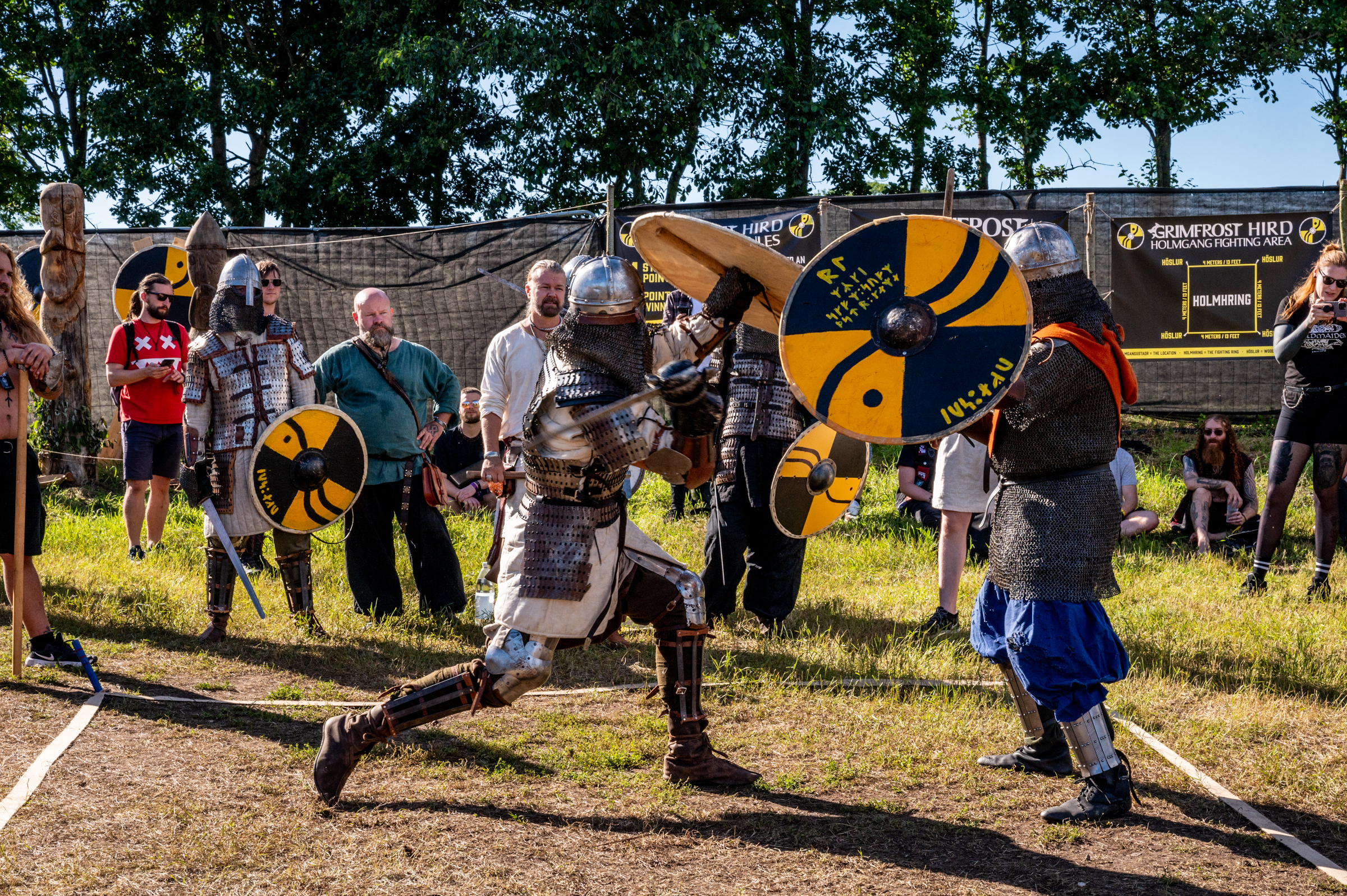
Historical reenactors recreating a holmgang

In 1957, Poul Anderson, a Danish-American who frequently used Viking themes in his writings, published the science fiction story "Holmgang" (collected in the 1982 anthology Cold Victory). The story's two protagonists, feuding spacemen of the future who are of distant Scandinavian origin and one of whom (the villain) is historically conscious, decide to revive this Viking tradition, resorting to a deadly holmgang on a lonely asteroid instead of a sea island, in order to settle their irreconcilable differences over a tangled issue involving crime, politics, and a woman's love. Anderson's protagonist in "The Man Who Came Early", set in 10th-century Iceland, is also forced into a holmgang.

Holmgang is the name of a Norwegian TV-debate program that aired on the commercial Norwegian station TV 2 from 1992 to 2008.

In the 2001 novel Kushiel's Dart by Jacqueline Carey, the fictional Skaldic people observe the holmgang and other Norse and Teutonic traditions. One Skaldic character challenges Joscelin Verreuil to holmgang.

The film The 13th Warrior (1999) includes a holmgang process, complete with insult, shields and weregild. The book the film is based on, Eaters of the Dead, contains the same scene with more detailed explanation of both the ritual and the significance of how it is carried out.

In the 2013 MMORPG Final Fantasy XIV: A Realm Reborn, the character class Marauder and its upgraded form Warrior has the ability Holmgang, which creates a chain that binds the user and their target together. They are immobile for the duration and must attack each other, in reference to how a real Holmgang would be conducted.

The Norwegian television series Norsemen featured a holmgang in the Season 1, Episode 1 of the series (between Arvid and Olvar), and again in the second season.

The 2020 video game Assassin's Creed Valhalla features several holmgangs throughout its story campaign.

In 2021, Pär Hulkoff (solo Swedish metal singer-songwriter) released a single, "Holmgång", for his upcoming album Ragnarök. The song, melodic and aggressive, ties the ancient Northern practice into modern military context.

In the 2022 film The Northman, Amleth and Fjölnir engage in a holmgang at the top of the volcano Hekla.

== See also ==
- Trial by combat
- Duel
