= Keyholder =

A key holder or keyholder may refer to:

- A person who has access control
- A keychain
- A store manager
- An individual or organisation with access to a cryptographic key

== Music ==
- Keyholder (album), a 2003 album by Kaipa
- "Keyholder," a song by Benea Reach
