= The Decca Years =

The Decca Years may refer to:

- The Decca Years (The Kingston Trio album)
- The Decca Years (Kaipa album)
