= Hand of Doom (disambiguation) =

"Hand of Doom" is a song by Black Sabbath.

Hand of Doom may also refer to:

- "Hand of Doom", a song by Carnal Forge from Please... Die!
- "Hand of Doom", a song by Manowar from Warriors of the World
- Hand of Doom, a Black Sabbath tribute band fronted by Melissa Auf der Maur

== See also ==
- "The Hands of Doom (Skit)", a song by MF Doom from Operation: Doomsday
- Red Hand of Doom, an adventure for the role-playing game Dungeons & Dragons
- Hellboy: The Right Hand of Doom, a trade-paperback collection in the Hellboy comics series
