= Händer =

Studio album by Kaipa
- Released: 1980
- Recorded: 1979; Polar Music Studio, Stockholm
- Genre: Progressive rock
- Length: 40:56

Kaipa chronology
Solo (1978)	Händer (1980)	Nattdjurstid (1982)

Händer is the fourth full-length album by progressive rock band Kaipa.

Prog described it as "the weakest Kaipa album by some margin."

== Track listing ==
Händer track listing
No.	Title	Length
1.	"Äntligen"	5:25
2.	"Händer"	6:12
3.	"Regn"	5:42
4.	"Staden Lever"	4:14
5.	"Elgrandi"	2:38
6.	"Krig"	5:05
7.	"Älska Med Mig Igen"	6:45
8.	"Med Trasiga Segel"	4:55
Total length:		40:56

== Personnel ==
- Mats Löfgren - vocals
- Max Åhman - guitars
- Hans Lundin - synthesizer, vocals, piano
- Mats Lindberg - bass
- Ingemar Bergman - drums, vocals
