= Testify for My Victims =

Studio album by Carnal Forge
- Released: 22 May 2007
- Recorded: December 2006 – January 2007
- Genre: Melodic death metal; thrash metal
- Length: 48:13
- Label: Candlelight

Carnal Forge chronology
Aren't You Dead Yet? (2004)	Testify for My Victims (2007)	Gun to Mouth Salvation (2019)

Professional ratings
Review scores
Source	Rating
AllMusic	3.5/5 stars

Testify for My Victims is sixth full-length album by the Swedish band Carnal Forge, released in 2007.

== Track listing ==
1. "Testify for My Victims" - 4:03
2. "Burning Eden" - 4:15
3. "Numb (The Dead)" - 2:52
4. "Godsend Gods End" - 4:53
5. "End Game" - 4:13
6. "Questions Pertaining the Ownership of My Mind" - 4:14
7. "Freedom by Mutilation" - 3:48
8. "Subhuman" - 3:49
9. "No Longer Bleeding" - 4:17
10. "Biological Waste Matter" - 3:35
11. "Lost Legion" - 3:01
12. "Ante Mori" - 5:13

== Personnel ==
- Jens C. Mortensen – vocals
- Stefan Westerberg – drums
- Jari Kuusisto – guitar
- Petri Kuusisto – guitar
- Lars Lindén – bass
