= The Singularity (Phase II – Xenotaph) =

Studio album by Scar Symmetry
- Released: 9 June 2023
- Genres: Melodic death metal; progressive metal; power metal
- Length: 58:08
- Label: Nuclear Blast
- Producer: Per Nilsson

Scar Symmetry chronology
The Singularity (Phase I – Neohumanity) (2014)	The Singularity (Phase II – Xenotaph) (2023)

Singles from The Singularity (Phase II – Xenotaph)
- 1. "Scorched Quadrant" Released: 31 March 2023; 2. "Chrononautilus" Released: 4 May 2023

The Singularity (Phase II – Xenotaph) is the seventh studio album by Swedish melodic death metal band Scar Symmetry. The album was released on 9 June 2023 through Nuclear Blast and was produced by Per Nilsson, the band's lead guitarist. This is also the band's last album featuring founding member and drummer Henrik Ohlsson as well as guitarist Benjamin Ellis.

== Background and promotion ==
On 20 March 2023, Scar Symmetry announced that recording sessions have wrapped for the album and revealed the record's title. On 31 March, the band released the first single "Scorched Quadrant" and its corresponding music video. At the same time, they officially published the release date, album cover and track list.

On 4 May, one month before the album release, the band released the second single "Chrononautilus" along with an accompanying music video. The music video for "Overworld" was released on 9 June 2023, coinciding with the album release. On 19 July, the music video for the title track premiered on Nuclear Blast's YouTube channel.

== Critical reception ==
Professional ratings
Review scores
Source	Rating
Blabbermouth.net	8.5/10
Distorted Sound	8/10
Ghost Cult	8/10
Metal Injection	8/10
Metal Storm	7.3/10
Rock 'N' Load	8/10

The album received generally positive reviews from critics. Dom Lawson from Blabbermouth.net gave the album 8.5 out of 10 and said: "Scar Symmetry's holistic melo-death explorations continue to dazzle with refinement and melodic audacity, but this one will smash your face in too. It's what the future sounds like. Get used to it." Tim Bolitho-Jones of Distorted Sound scored the album 8 out of 10 and said: "That being said, choosing which songs to cut is beyond us and there are no glaring weak points. The middle part of a trilogy is usually the least satisfying, but despite being a bit unwieldy and overlong, Xenotaph is hugely entertaining. You can tell there's been a remarkable amount of effort put into creating this album and long-time Scar Symmetry fans will welcome this with wide open arms. And we haven't even mentioned the killer closing duo of 'Soulscanner' and the title track. It's good to have you back guys. Also, there are aliens this time." Ghost Cult gave the album 8 out of 10 and stated: "Scary Symmetry have always been one of those bands who have never quite received the plaudits they deserve and Xenotaph is both further evidence of this and a flag in the ground for what they are capable of. Very few melodic Death Metal bands can emphasise the melodicism and the aggression so excellently and vividly whilst arming it with such adventurousness in songwriting."

Metal Injection rated the album 8 out of 10 and stated, "The Singularity (Phase II − Xenotaph) doesn't match Neohumanity's freshness, unity, and variety, but it's far from a major letdown. Really, it's just a noticeably more monotonous and less striving extension of the same musical and conceptual formulas. Either way, it's still a damn fine album and a testament to Scar Symmetry's dedicated and characteristic chemistry." Rock 'N' Load praised the album saying, "Whether you are a fan of Extreme Metal, Prog or Melodic there is something in this 11-track, 58-minute album and most importantly – that something you will find is something you are likely to want to keep listening it over and over. For a band that has had so long away and some drastic changes in line up – The Singularity Phase II – Xenotaph is a great way to return."

== Track listing ==
All lyrics are written by Henrik Ohlsson; all music is composed by Per Nilsson.

The Singularity (Phase II – Xenotaph) track listing
No.	Title	Length
1.	"Chrononautilus"	5:04
2.	"Scorched Quadrant"	5:05
3.	"Overworld"	3:51
4.	"Altergeist"	6:12
5.	"Reichsfall"	5:15
6.	"Digiphrenia Dawn"	5:32
7.	"Hyperborean Plains"	5:07
8.	"Gridworm"	5:06
9.	"A Voyage with Tailed Meteors"	4:55
10.	"Soulscanner"	4:07
11.	"Xenotaph" (feat. The Ultraterrestrial Choir)	7:51
Total length:		58:08

== Personnel ==
Scar Symmetry

- Roberth Karlsson – harsh vocals
- Lars Palmqvist – clean vocals
- Per Nilsson – lead guitar, keyboards, bass, backing and clean vocals, production, mixing, mastering
- Benjamin Ellis – rhythm guitar, backing and clean vocals
- Henrik Ohlsson – drums

Additional personnel

- William Blackmon – drum engineering
- Pierre-Alain Durand – artwork, layout
- Mattias Sulander – photography
