= The Unseen Empire =

Studio album by Scar Symmetry
- Released: 15 April 2011
- Recorded: November 2010 – January 2011
- Studios: Black Lounge and Abyss Studios
- Genres: Melodic death metal; pop metal
- Length: 43:07
- Label: Nuclear Blast
- Producers: Per Nilsson; Jonas Kjellgren

Scar Symmetry chronology
Dark Matter Dimensions (2009)	The Unseen Empire (2011)	The Singularity (Phase I – Neohumanity) (2014)

Professional ratings
Review scores
Source	Rating
AllMusic	3.5/5 stars
Metalholic	8.8/10
Rockfreaks.net	7/10 stars
Thrash Hits	5.5/6 stars

The Unseen Empire is the fifth studio album by Swedish melodic death metal band Scar Symmetry. It was released on 15 April 2011 in Europe, and on 17 May 2011 in North America. The album sold around 1,500 copies in the United States in its first week of release, and landed at position number 11 on the Top New Artist Albums (Heatseekers) chart. This is the last album to feature contributions from guitarist Jonas Kjellgren, who left the band in 2013 due to other commitments.

Drummer Henrik Ohlsson said that the album "seeks to expose the hidden hand of the elite that pull the strings of mankind in order to fulfill their agenda of global domination."

== Track listing ==
All lyrics are written by Henrik Ohlsson; all music is composed by Jonas Kjellgren and Per Nilsson.

No.	Title	Length
1.	"The Anomaly"	3:50
2.	"Illuminoid Dream Sequence"	5:01
3.	"Extinction Mantra"	5:31
4.	"Seers of the Eschaton"	5:51
5.	"Domination Agenda"	4:00
6.	"Astronomicon"	4:03
7.	"Rise of the Reptilian Regime"	4:24
8.	"The Draconian Arrival"	5:25
9.	"Alpha and Omega"	5:02
Total length:		43:07

== Personnel ==
- Roberth Karlsson – lead growl vocals, backing clean vocals
- Lars Palmqvist – lead clean vocals, backing growl vocals
- Per Nilsson – lead guitar, rhythm guitar, keyboards
- Jonas Kjellgren – rhythm guitar, lead guitar, keyboards
- Kenneth Seil – bass
- Henrik Ohlsson – drums

== Release history ==
Date	Region
15 April 2011	Europe
17 May 2011	North America
