= Firedemon =

Studio album by Carnal Forge
- Released: April 14, 2000
- Recorded: 1999
- Genre: Melodic death metal
- Length: 34:49
- Label: Century Media

Carnal Forge chronology
Who's Gonna Burn (1998)	Firedemon (2000)	Please... Die! (2001)

Professional ratings
Review scores
Source	Rating
Allmusic	2.5/5 stars

Firedemon is the second full-length album by the death metal band, Carnal Forge. It was released in 2000.

== Track listing ==
1. "Too Much Hell Ain't Enough for Me" - 2:20
2. "Covered with Fire (I'm Hell)" - 4:09
3. "I Smell Like Death (Son of a Bastard)" - 2:59
4. "Chained" - 2:51
5. "Defacer" - 3:05
6. "Pull the Trigger" - 2:30
7. "Uncontrollable" - 3:16
8. "Firedemon" - 2:26
9. "Cure of Blasphemy" - 2:56
10. "Headfucker" - 3:29
11. "The Torture Will Never Stop" - 2:03
12. "A Revel in Violence" - 2:45

Tracks 5 and 11 composed by Kjellgren. All other tracks composed by Kjellgren, Kuusisto, Magnusson and Westerberg.

== Personnel ==
- Jonas Kjellgren - Vocals
- Jari Kuusisto - Guitars
- Johan Magnusson - Guitars
- Stefan Westerberg - Drums
- Petri Kuusisto - Bass
