= Aren't You Dead Yet? =

Studio album by Carnal Forge
- Released: June 21, 2004
- Recorded: 1 January–4 March 2004
- Genres: Melodic death metal Thrash metal
- Length: 39:12
- Label: Century Media
- Producer: Carnal Forge

Carnal Forge chronology
| The More You Suffer (2003) | Aren't You Dead Yet? (2004) | Testify for My Victims (2007) |

Professional ratings
Review scores
| Source | Rating |
|---|---|
| AllMusic | 3.5/5 stars |

Aren't You Dead Yet? is the fifth album by Swedish metal band Carnal Forge. It is the final Carnal Forge release with Jonas Kjellgren.

== Track listing ==
1. "Decades of Despair" - 3:02
2. "My Suicide" - 3:54
3. "Burn Them Alive" - 4:26
4. "Waiting for Sundown" - 3:14
5. "Exploding Veins" - 4:08
6. "Sacred Flame" - 2:33
7. "Inhuman" - 3:28
8. "Final Hour in Hell" - 3:07
9. "Totally Worthless" - 4:23
10. "The Strength of Misery" - 3:25
11. "Ruler of Your Blood" (Japanese bonus track) - 3:32

=== B-sides ===
1. "God's Enemy #1"

== Line up ==
Jonas Kjellgren - Vocals
Stefan Westerberg - Drums
Jari Kuusisto - Guitar
Petri Kuusisto - Guitar
Lars Lindén - Bass
