= Nattdjurstid =

Studio album by Kaipa
- Released: 1982
- Recorded: 1982; Eugen Petrén’s Studio, Uppsala, Sweden
- Genre: Progressive rock
- Length: 38:22
- Label: Piglet Records
- Producer: Kaipa

Kaipa chronology
Händer (1980)	Nattdjurstid (1982)

Nattdjurstid is the fifth full-length album by progressive rock band Kaipa.

== Track listing ==
1. "Galen" - 2:45
2. "Nattdjurstid" - 5:52
3. "Timmar av glas" - 2:12
4. "Zepapo" - 3:23
5. "Identitetskris" - 4:37
6. "Inom oss" - 3:28
7. "Speglarna" - 5:45
8. "Närmare" - 4:40
9. "Väntar en storm" - 5:40

== Personnel ==
- Max Åhman - electric guitar, backing vocals
- Hans Lundin - synthesizer, lead and backing vocals
- Mats Lindberg - bass, backing vocals
- Pelle Andersson - drums, backing vocals
- Adam Bracci - windchimes, cymbals
