= Fleshquartet =

Swedish band

Fleshquartet (Swedish: Fläskkvartetten) is a Swedish band. Despite the band's name, Fläskkvartetten is in reality a quintet consisting of an electrical string quartet plus a percussionist. The band often collaborates with vocalists who comprise a veritable Who's Who of Swedish alternative music. The musical style ranges from classical string music to experimental rock.

Three of the members, Örjan Högberg, Jonas Lindgren and Mattias Helldén, met at Royal College of Music in Stockholm in the 1970s. They were joined by Sebastian Öberg and Johan Söderberg before the band released their first album.

Fläskkvartetten won a Grammis award for the best instrumental album for Goodbye Sweden in 1990 and another Grammis for best album with their 1993 album "Flow". They received the Spelmannen award from Expressen in 2002.

The name is inspired by classical ensemble Freskkvartetten, but was modified to "Fläskkvartetten" after Joakim Thåström shouted "Fläska på" (Get moving/Hurry up) to the members whilst recording a new song.

Fläskkvartetten has provided incidental music for the Swedish television series Wallander.

== Members ==
- Mattias Helldén, cello
- Örjan Högberg, viola
- Sebastian Öberg, cello
- Jonas Lindgren, violin
- Christian Olsson, drums, programming and samples

== Former members ==
- Freddie Wadling Vocals. Member or "frequent guest"?
- Jean-Louis Huhta
- Morgan Ågren

== Discography ==
- Meat Beat (1987)
- What's Your Pleasure? (1988)
- Goodbye Sweden (1990)
- Fläskkvartetten (1992)
- Flow (1993)
- Pärlor från svin (1995)
- Fire Fire (1996)
- Jag gör vad som helst för lite solsken (1998)
- Love Go (2000)
- Pärlor från svin 2 (2002)
- Vita Droppar (2003)
- Voices of Eden (2007)
