= Mindrevolutions =

Studio album by Kaipa
- Released: May 30, 2005
- Recorded: November 2004 – March 2005; HGL Studio, Uppsala, Sweden
- Genre: Progressive rock, symphonic rock
- Length: 79:11
- Label: InsideOut Music
- Producer: Hans Lundin, Roine Stolt

Kaipa chronology
Keyholder (2003)	Mindrevolutions (2005)	Angling Feelings (2007)

Mindrevolutions is the eighth studio album by Swedish progressive rock band Kaipa. It is the band's last album to feature Roine Stolt on guitar. This album also contains Kaipa's longest composition, the title track, clocking in at almost 26 minutes.

== Track listing ==
All songs by Hans Lundin. All lyrics by Hans Lundin and Roine Stolt except where noted.

No.	Title	Lyrics	Length
1.	"The Dodger"		8:09
2.	"Electric Leaves"		4:13
3.	"Shadow of Time"	Lundin	6:50
4.	"A Pair of Sunbeams"		5:19
5.	"Mindrevolutions"		25:47
6.	"Flowing Free"		3:53
7.	"Last Free Indian"	Stolt	7:27
8.	"Our Deepest Inner Shore"		4:59
9.	"Timebomb"		4:32
10.	"Remains of the Day"	Stolt	8:02
Total length:			79:11

== Personnel ==
- Hans Lundin - keyboards, vocals
- Roine Stolt - guitars
- Morgan Ågren - drums
- Aleena Gibson - vocals
- Patrik Lundström - vocals
- Jonas Reingold - bass guitar
