= Holographic Universe (album) =

Studio album by Scar Symmetry
- Released: 20 June 2008
- Recorded: 3 December 2007 – 3 February 2008
- Studio: Black Lounge Studios, Avesta, Sweden
- Genre: Melodic death metal; progressive metal
- Length: 58:40
- Label: Nuclear Blast
- Producer: Jonas Kjellgren

Scar Symmetry chronology
Pitch Black Progress (2006)	Holographic Universe (2008)	Dark Matter Dimensions (2009)

Singles from Holographic Universe
- 1. "Morphogenesis" Released: 17 September 2008

Holographic Universe is the third studio album by Swedish melodic death metal band Scar Symmetry. It was released on 20 June 2008 in Europe and on 7 July 2008 in North America. It is the last album to feature vocalist Christian Älvestam, who parted ways with the band shortly after the album's completion. Holographic Universe peaked on the charts at 37 in Finland and 65 in Austria. A music video for the song "Morphogenesis" premiered on 18 September.

== Background ==
- The album is rumoured to be loosely based on Michael Talbot's book The Holographic Universe.
- It is the only album where all the members of the band share equal credit on writing and composition.
- "The Three Dimensional Shadow" was the first Scar Symmetry song to feature the use of an eight-string guitar.
- A thirteenth track, "Disintegrate the Hourglass", was written and recorded for the album, but was not included on the album.

== Reception ==
Professional ratings
Review scores
Source	Rating
Sputnikmusic	4/5 stars
Allmusic	3.5/5 stars
PiercingMetal	4/5 stars
Blabbermouth.net	8/10 stars

Upon release, the science and mysticism themed Holographic Universe was considered Scar Symmetry's most commercially focused album, with critics drawing comparisons with progressive metal band Dream Theater. AllMusic comments that the band "appears more serious than ever about contrasting super melodic choruses, guitar harmonies, and even intermittent synths, against aesthetic evil twins like furious death metal growls, aggressive riffing, and torrential drumming". Blabbermouth.net argues that the album does not dramatically expand on previous releases, but is a "well-planned and structured album that comes across as accessible and heavy at the same time".

== Track listing ==
All music and lyrics by Scar Symmetry.

No.	Title	Length
1.	"Morphogenesis"	3:56
2.	"Timewave Zero"	5:13
3.	"Quantumleaper"	4:09
4.	"Artificial Sun Projection"	3:58
5.	"The Missing Coordinates"	4:37
6.	"Ghost Prototype I – Measurement of Thought"	4:35
7.	"Fear Catalyst"	5:03
8.	"Trapezoid"	4:17
9.	"Prism and Gate"	3:46
10.	"Holographic Universe"	9:05
11.	"The Three-Dimensional Shadow"	3:57
12.	"Ghost Prototype II – Deus Ex Machina"	6:02
Total length:		58:40

== Credits ==
Scar Symmetry

- Christian Älvestam − vocals
- Jonas Kjellgren − guitar
- Per Nilsson − guitar
- Kenneth Seil − bass guitar
- Henrik Ohlsson − drums

== Release history ==
Country	Release date
Europe	20 June 2008
United States	7 July 2008

== See also ==
- Holographic principle
