= Angling Feelings =

Studio album by Kaipa
- Released: May 18, 2007
- Recorded: 2005–2007; HGL Studio, Uppsala, Sweden
- Genre: Progressive rock, symphonic rock
- Length: 64:24
- Label: InsideOut Music
- Producer: Hans Lundin

Kaipa chronology
Mindrevolutions (2005)	Angling Feelings (2007)	In the Wake of Evolution (2010)

Angling Feelings is an album by the band Kaipa.

== Track listing ==
1. "Angling Feelings" – 6:43
2. "The Glorious Silence Within – 7:16
3. "The Fleeting Existence of Time" – 12:34
4. "Pulsation" – 4:02
5. "Liquid Holes in the Sky" – 4:42
6. "Solitary Pathway" – 4:06
7. "Broken Chords" – 6:24
8. "Path of Humbleness" – 9:30
9. "Where's the Captain?" – 4:25
10. "This Ship of Life" – 4:40

All songs written by Hans Lundin

== Personnel ==
Kaipa:

- Hans Lundin: Electric, acoustic and virtual keyboards, vocals
- Per Nilsson: Electric guitars
- Morgan Ågren: Drums
- Jonas Reingold: Electric basses
- Patrik Lundström: Vocals
- Aleena Gibson: Vocals

With Fredrik Lindqvist: Recorders & whistles (Track 1, 2, 8, 9 & 10)
