= Kaipa =

Swedish progressive rock group

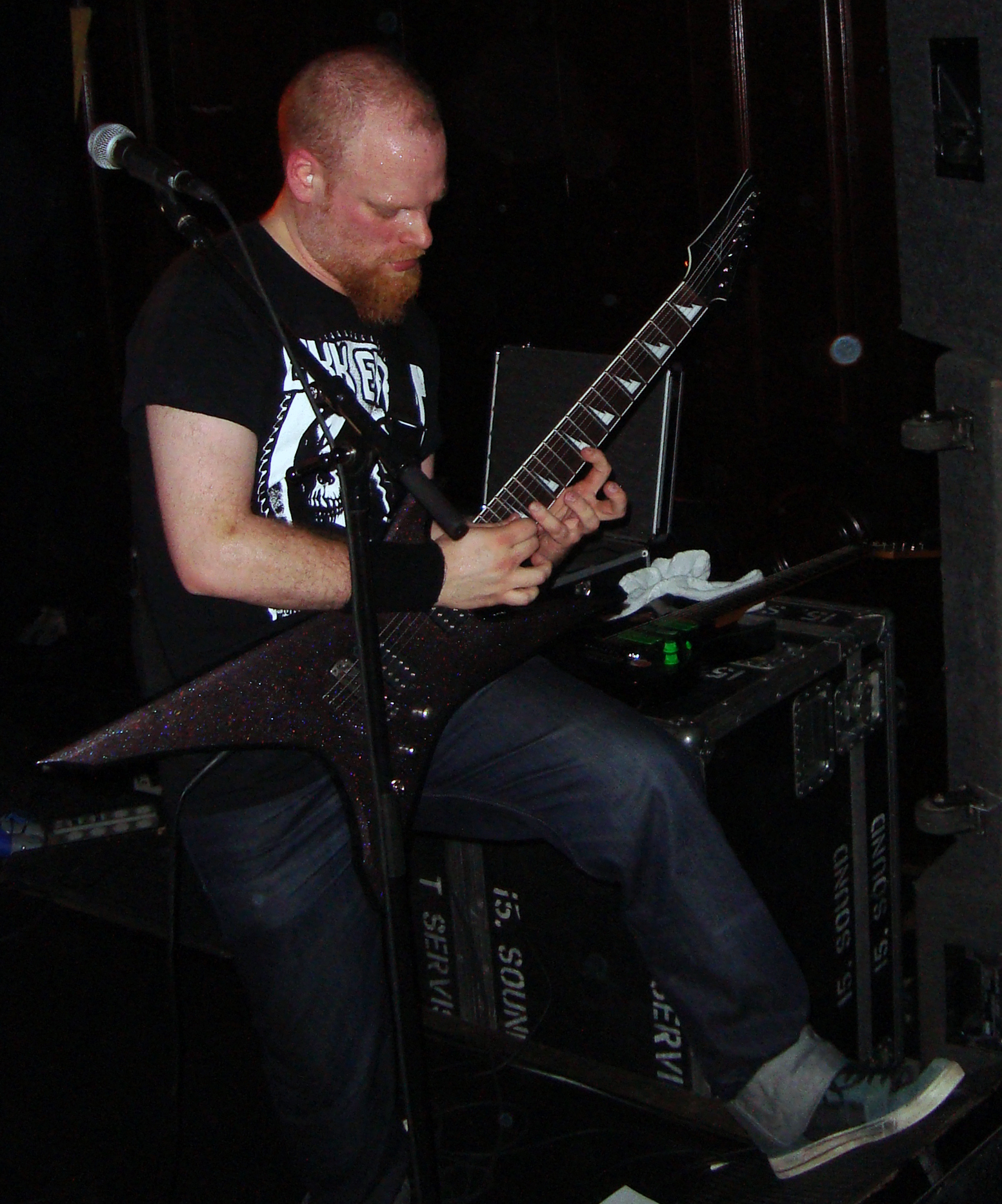
- Per Nilsson performing in April 2010

Background information
- Also known as: Ura Kaipa (1973–74)
- Origin: Sweden
- Genres: Progressive rock
- Years active: 1973–present
- Labels: Decca, Inside Out, Musea
- Members: Hans Lundin; Patrik Lundström; Aleena Gibson; Jonas Reingold; Per Nilsson; Darby Todd
- Past members: Tomas Eriksson; Roine Stolt; Ingemar Bergman; Mats Lindberg; Mats Löfgren; Max Åhman; Mats "Microben" Lindberg; Per "Pelle" Andersson; Morgan Ågren

Kaipa is a Swedish progressive rock band.

== History ==
The band was formed as Ura Kaipa by Hans Lundin (keyboards) and Tomas Eriksson (bass) from San Michael's. Roine Stolt joined Kaipa as guitarist when he was 17. In 1974, shortly after they had cut the "Ura" from the name of the band, they released their self-titled debut album. Stolt, who later founded The Flower Kings, left the group in 1979, after the album Solo.

In 2014, original members Roine Stolt, Ingemar Bergman, and Tomas Eriksson re-grouped under the name Kaipa DaCapo to play the old music from the first three albums as well as brand new music. New members of the band are Mikael Stolt, brother of Roine, on vocals and guitar, and renowned Swedish musician Max Lorentz on keyboards. A new album was released in 2016, followed by a live album recorded in 2017.

== Members ==
Current

- Hans Lundin – keyboards, backing vocals (1973–1982, 2000–present), lead vocals (1973–1977, 1980-1982)
- Patrik Lundström – vocals (2000–present)
- Aleena Gibson – vocals (2000–present)
- Jonas Reingold – bass (2000–present)
- Per Nilsson – guitars (2006–present)
- Darby Todd – drums (2021–present)

Former

- Tomas Eriksson – bass (1973–1977)
- Roine Stolt – guitars, backing vocals (1974–1979, 2000–2005)
- Ingemar Bergman – drums (1974–1981)
- Mats Lindberg – bass (1977–1980)
- Mats Löfgren – vocals (1977–1980) (d. 2016)
- Max Åhman – guitars (1979–1982)
- Mats "Microben" Lindberg – bass (1981–1982)
- Per "Pelle" Andersson – drums (1982)
- Morgan Ågren – drums (2000–2021)

== Discography ==
=== Studio albums ===
- Kaipa (1975)
- Inget nytt under solen (1976)
- Solo (1978)
- Händer (1980)
- Nattdjurstid (1982)
- Stockholm Symphonie (1993)
- Notes from the Past (2002)
- Keyholder (2003)
- Mindrevolutions (2005)
- Angling Feelings (2007)
- In the Wake of Evolution (2010)
- Vittjar (2012)
- Sattyg (2014)
- Children of the Sounds (2017)
- Urskog (2022)
- Sommargryningsljus (2024)

=== Compilations ===
- The Decca Years 1975–1978 (2005)

== See also ==
- The Flower Kings
