= The Singularity (Phase I – Neohumanity) =

Studio album by Scar Symmetry
- Released: 3 October 2014
- Recorded: December 2013 − August 2014
- Studio: Studio Overlook and Studio Kabyss
- Genre: Melodic death metal; progressive metal; power metal
- Length: 43:22
- Label: Nuclear Blast
- Producer: Per Nilsson

Scar Symmetry chronology
The Unseen Empire (2011)	The Singularity (Phase I – Neohumanity) (2014)	The Singularity (Phase II – Xenotaph) (2023)

The Singularity (Phase I – Neohumanity) is the sixth studio album by Swedish melodic death metal band Scar Symmetry, released by Nuclear Blast on 3 October 2014 (EU). This is the first album of the Singularity trilogy, and the first Scar Symmetry album to be composed, produced, mixed and mastered entirely by guitarist Per Nilsson, and is the last album with Kenneth Seil on bass.

The Singularity (Phase I – Neohumanity) sold 1,500 units in the United States in its first week and debuted at No. 199 on the Billboard 200.

== Album information ==
The first phase of the trilogy is centered on the rise of "artilects (artificial intellects) with mental capacities far above the human level of thought" and that "by the year 2030, one of the world's biggest industries will be 'artificial brains,' used to control artilects that will be genuinely intelligent and useful." The lyrical content focuses on the divide between "those who embrace the new technology and those who oppose it" due to the social issues caused by the rise of artificial intelligence and the emergence of transhumanists who add artilect technology to their own bodies.

== Critical reception ==
Professional ratings
Review scores
Source	Rating
All About The Rock	8.5/10 stars

Writing for All About The Rock Anthony Biello scored the album 8.5 out of 10 and said "I wasn't expecting such a well written record from a band I discarded years ago. If you are a fan of Power, Progressive or Death Metal, then check this out. Scar Symmetry blends all of those genres together unlike any other band I've ever heard before. Supposedly this is the first concept album of a trilogy, and if the next 2 are even close to The Singularity (Phase I – Neohumanity), I would consider it a success."

== Track listing ==
All lyrics are written by Henrik Ohlsson; all music is composed by Per Nilsson.

No.	Title	Length
1.	"The Shape of Things to Come"	0:52
2.	"Neohuman"	8:43
3.	"Limits to Infinity"	4:57
4.	"Cryonic Harvest"	6:12
5.	"The Spiral Timeshift"	4:50
6.	"Children of the Integrated Circuit" (instrumental)	2:25
7.	"Neuromancers"	5:11
8.	"Technocalyptic Cybergeddon"	10:12
Total length:		43:22

== Personnel ==
- Lars Palmqvist – clean vocals, backing vocals
- Roberth Karlsson – harsh vocals, backing vocals (tracks 2 and 3)
- Per Nilsson – guitars, keyboards, backing vocals, clean vocals (tracks 1, 2, 5 and 8)
- Kenneth Seil – bass
- Henrik Ohlsson – drums

== Release history ==
Region	Release date
Europe	3 October 2014
United Kingdom/France	13 October 2014
North America	14 October 2014
