= Raubtier =

Swedish industrial metal band

- Origin: Haparanda, Sweden
- Genre: Industrial metal
- Years active: 2008–present
- Label: Dezpotz Records
- Members: Pär Hulkoff; Mattias "Buffeln" Lind; Jonas Kjellgren
- Past members: Aron Tideström; Thorbjörn Englund; Hussni Mörsare; Gustaf Jorde; Waylon
- Website: www.raubtier.se

Raubtier (German for "predator") is a Swedish industrial metal band from Haparanda. They released their debut album, Det finns bara krig ("There is only war" in English), in 2009. Their first single, Kamphund ("Attack Dog"), had already become a hit on the Swedish radio station Bandit Rock 106,3. The band's second album, titled Skriet från Vildmarken ("The Call of the Wild"), was released in 2010.

Raubtier toured with Sabaton during Sabaton's "World War Tour" in December 2010 which saw them visit several countries in Scandinavia.

Raubtier released a new single in November 2013 called Qaqortoq which was later included in the upcoming album Pansargryning which was released in May 2014.

A further single, titled Den Sista Kulan ("The Last Bullet") was released at the end of August 2015, again as a teaser for the upcoming album Bärsärkagång, which was later released on 19 February 2016. This album also came in a special edition with commentary from Hulkoff, where he talks about his inspirations and each song's meaning.

Their lyrics are mainly in Swedish, with occasional exceptions, such as Dragunov (English), Preludium: Praeparatus Supervivet (Latin), and Tropaion (partly in Afrikaans).

== Members ==
=== Current members ===
- Pär Hulkoff (Atomkraft, Bourbon Boys, Scythikon, ex-Viperine) – vocals, guitar, keyboard
- Jonas Kjellgren – bass
- Mattias "Buffeln" Lind – drums

=== Previous members ===
- Aron Tideström – djembe
- Waylon – bass
- Hussni Mörsare – bass
- Thorbjörn Englund – bass
- Gustaf Jorde – bass (Defleshed)

== Discography ==
=== Albums ===
Year	Album	Peak	Certification
Year	Album	SWE	Certification
2009	Det finns bara krig	17	
2010	Skriet från Vildmarken	14	
2012	Från Norrland till Helvetets Port	4	
2014	Pansargryning	5	
2016	Bärsärkagång	3	
2019	Överlevare	10	

=== Track lists ===
==== Det Finns Bara Krig (2009) ====
("There Is Only War"; released on 25 March 2009)

Original Swedish title	Duration	Translation
Det Finns Bara Krig	(02:58)	There Is Only War
Kamphund	(02:27)	Attack Dog
Achtung Panzer	(03:35)	Attention, Tank (German)
Dieseldöden	(03:14)	The Diesel Death
Dobermann	(03:35)	Doberman
Änglar	(03:33)	Angels
Legoknekt	(03:08)	Mercenary
En Starkare Art	(03:45)	A Stronger Species
Hjärteblod	(03:45)	Heartblood
Terror	(02:36)	Terror
Inget Hopp	(05:37)	No Hope
Götterdämmerung	(03:01)	Twilight of the Gods (German)
Dragunov (bonus track)	(03:00)	Dragunov

==== Skriet Från Vildmarken (2010) ====
("Scream from the Wilderness"; released on 22 September 2010; the album title is also the Swedish translation of the title of Jack London's The Call of the Wild)

Original Swedish title	Duration	Translation
Praedator	(03:11)	Predator (Latin)
Himmelsfärdskommando	(03:39)	Heaven-bound Commando
Skriet Från Vildmarken	(03:32)	Call of the Wild
Världsherravälde	(03:58)	World Domination
Lebensgefahr	(03:42)	Mortal Danger (German)
Hulkovius Rex	(03:49)	King Hulkoff (Latin)
Mordbrandsrök	(04:04)	Smoke of Arson
Lennart	(03:05)	Lennart (inspired by a real person)
Ingenting Är Glömt	(03:20)	Nothing Is Forgotten
Polarvargen	(03:56)	The Polar Wolf
Armageddon	(02:41)	Armageddon
En Hjältes Väg	(04:24)	Path of a Hero

==== Från Norrland Till Helvetets Port (2012) ====
("From Norrland to the Gates of Hell"; released 25 April 2012)

Original Swedish title	Duration	Translation
Sveriges Elit	(03:55)	Sweden's Elite
Apokalyps	(02:43)	Apocalypse
Besten I Mig	(03:21)	The Beast Within Me
Låt Napalmen Regna	(03:24)	Let the Napalm Rain
Allt Förlorat	(03:38)	Everything Lost
Kamouflage	(04:15)	Camouflage
Fafnesbane	(03:01)	Bane of Fafnir
Vittring	(03:28)	Scent
Dit Vinden Bär	(04:19)	Where the Wind Carries
Rebeller	(03:14)	Rebels
Vapenbröder	(03:06)	Brothers in Arms
Förgätmigej	(04:01)	Forget-Me-Not

==== Pansargryning (2014) ====
("Panzer Dawn"; released 5 February 2014)

Original Swedish title	Duration	Translation
Dieselrök	(03:17)	Diesel Smoke
Jaga Hårt	(03:15)	Hunt Hard
Panzarmarsch	(03:31)	Panzer March
Från Min Kalla Döda Hand	(03:26)	From My Cold Dead Hand
Raptor	(03:05)	Raptor
Flugornas Herre	(03:17)	Lord of the Flies
Leviatan	(03:48)	Leviathan
Qaqortoq	(03:52)	Qaqortoq
Bränder	(03:12)	Fires
Opus Magni	(03:31)	Great Work (Latin)
Skjut, Gräv, Tig	(02:46)	Shoot, Shovel, Shut up
Innan Löven Faller	(04:08)	Before the Leaves Fall

==== Bärsärkagång (2016) ====
("Going Berserk"; released 19 February 2016)

Original Swedish title	Duration	Translation
Bärsärkagång	(03:57)	Going Berserk
Bothniablod	(04:30)	Bothnia Blood
Den Sista Kulan	(03:57)	The Last Bullet
Levande Död	(03:13)	Living Dead
Tropaion	(03:16)	Tropaion
Brännmärkt	(03:02)	Branded
Hymn	(03:16)	Hymn
Förvildad	(03:55)	Feral
Praetorian	(03:02)	Praetorian
Genom Allt	(04:04)	Through It All
Röd Snö	(03:40)	Red Snow
Lejonhjärta	(05:44)	Lion Heart

==== Överlevare (2019) ====
("Survivor"; released 20 September 2019)

Original Swedish title	Duration	Translation
Preludium: Praeparatus Supervivet	(01:44)	Prelude: The Prepared Survives (Latin)
Högt, Fritt och Blött	(04:29)	High, Free and Wet
Ovtjarka	(02:52)	Caucasian Shepherd Dog
A. I	(05:00)	AI (Artificial Intelligence)
Kommando X	(03:42)	Commando X
Bunkern	(03:49)	The Bunker
Huvudjägarsång	(03:34)	Head Hunter's Song
Serum	(03:54)	Serum
Dystopi	(04:45)	Dystopia
Neodymium	(04:21)	Neodymium

=== Singles ===
Each single contains only its title track.

- Kamphund (2008)
- Achtung Panzer (2009)
- Världsherravälde (2010)
- Lebensgefahr (2010)
- K3 (2010) (digital download)
- Låt Napalmen Regna (2012)
- Sveriges Elit (2012)
- Besten i Mig (2012)
- Qaqortoq (2013)
- Skjut, Gräv, Tig (2013)
- Innan Löven Faller (2014)
- Panzarmarsch (2014)
- Den Sista Kulan (2015)
- Bothniablod (2015)
- Brännmärkt (2015)
- Ovtjarka (2019)
- Bunkern (2019)
