= Please... Die! =

Please ... Die!

Studio album by Carnal Forge
- Released: January 22, 2002
- Recorded: June – July 2001
- Genre: Melodic death metal
- Length: 37:09
- Label: Century Media

Carnal Forge chronology
| Firedemon (2000) | Please ... Die! (2002) | The More You Suffer (2003) |

Professional ratings
Review scores
| Source | Rating |
|---|---|
| AllMusic | 3/5 stars |

Please ... Die! is the third full-length album by the death metal band, Carnal Forge, released in 2002.

== Track listing ==
1. "Butchered, Slaughtered, Strangled, Hanged" – 2:28
2. "Hand of Doom" – 3:48
3. "Fuel for Fire" – 2:00
4. "Totalitarian Torture" – 3:01
5. "Everything Dies" – 2:56
6. "Slaves" – 2:15
7. "Welcome to Your Funeral" – 3:34
8. "Please... Die! (Aren't You Dead Yet?)" – 2:20
9. "Becoming Dust" – 3:18
10. "No Resurrection" – 2:37
11. "A World All Soaked in Blood" – 3:07
12. "A Higher Level of Pain" – 5:30

== Personnel ==
- Stefan Westerberg – drums
- Jari Kuusisto – guitar
- Jonas Kjellgren – vocals
- Petri Kuusisto – guitar
- Lars Lindén – bass
