= Pitch Black Progress =

Studio album by Scar Symmetry
- Released: 21 April 2006
- Recorded: 2005
- Studio: Black Lounge Studios, Avesta, Sweden
- Genre: Melodic death metal
- Length: 48:27; 59:23 (with bonus tracks)
- Label: Nuclear Blast, Dream On
- Producer: Jonas Kjellgren

Scar Symmetry chronology
Symmetric in Design (2005)	Pitch Black Progress (2006)	Holographic Universe (2008)

Singles from Pitch Black Progress
- 1. "The Illusionist" Released: 2006; 2. "The Illusionist (re-release)" Released: 2007

Professional ratings
Review scores
Source	Rating
AllMusic	4.5/5 stars
Blabbermouth	7.5/10

Pitch Black Progress is the second studio album by Swedish melodic death metal band Scar Symmetry. The album was released in Europe on 21 April 2006 and in North America on 2 May 2006 through Nuclear Blast.

The album's artwork and layout was created by Anthony Clarkson. Allmusic praised the album's "uncompromisingly extreme hard-soft dynamics and accompanying, remarkably accessible sing-and-grunt-along choruses".

The track "The Illusionist" was promoted with two different music videos; the second version used as the official video by releasing label Nuclear Blast. The original version is available at the band's own YouTube site.

== Track listing ==
All lyrics are written by Henrik Ohlsson.

Standard edition
No.	Title	Music	Length
1.	"The Illusionist"	Per Nilsson	4:31
2.	"Slaves to the Subliminal"	Jonas Kjellgren; Christian Älvestam	5:04
3.	"Mind Machine"	Nilsson; Älvestam	3:54
4.	"Pitch Black Progress"	Kjellgren	3:26
5.	"Calculate the Apocalypse"	Nilsson	4:01
6.	"Dreaming 24/7"	Nilsson; Älvestam	4:11
7.	"Abstracted"	Kjellgren	3:25
8.	"The Kaleidoscopic God"	Kjellgren; Nilsson; Älvestam	7:09
9.	"Retaliator"	Kjellgren; Älvestam	4:13
10.	"Oscillation Point"	Kjellgren; Älvestam	4:04
11.	"The Path of Least Resistance"	Kjellgren; Älvestam	4:29

Special edition bonus tracks
No.	Title	Music	Length
12.	"Carved in Stone"	Kjellgren; Älvestam	5:29
13.	"Deviate from the Form"	Nilsson	5:27

== Credits ==
Scar Symmetry

- Christian Älvestam – vocals
- Jonas Kjellgren – guitar, keyboards, engineering, mixing, production, mastering
- Per Nilsson – guitar, keyboards
- Kenneth Seil – bass guitar
- Henrik Ohlsson – drums, lyrics

== Release history ==
Country	Release date
Europe	21 April 2006
United States	2 May 2006
South Korea	15 May 2006
