= The More You Suffer =

Studio album by Carnal Forge
- Released: 22 April 2003
- Recorded: 16 September – 27 October 2002
- Genre: Melodic death metal; thrash metal
- Length: 44:32
- Label: Century Media
- Producer: Carnal Forge

Carnal Forge chronology
Please... Die! (2001)	The More You Suffer (2003)	Aren't You Dead Yet? (2004)

Professional ratings
Review scores
Source	Rating
AllMusic	4/5 stars

The More You Suffer is the fourth full-length album by the Swedish metal band Carnal Forge.

== Track listing ==
1. "H.B.F. Suicide" – 3:23
2. "Deathblow" – 3:46
3. "Ripped & Torn" – 3:43
4. "Destroy Life" – 3:35
5. "Cursed" – 3:17
6. "Divine Killing Breed Machine" – 3:56
7. "Deep Rivers of Blood" – 4:37
8. "Breaking Boundaries" – 3:37
9. "Into Oblivion" – 4:01
10. "My Bloody Rampage" – 3:53
11. "Baptized in Fire" – 3:19
12. "Let Me Bleed" – 3:25

=== Japanese version bonus tracks ===
13. "Hits You Like a Hammer"
14. "Bulletproof God Material"
