= Keyholder (album) =

Studio album by Kaipa
- Released: August 28, 2003
- Recorded: 2003
- Genre: Progressive rock, symphonic rock
- Length: 78:25
- Label: InsideOut Music
- Producer: Hans Lundin

Kaipa chronology
Notes from the Past (2002)	Keyholder (2003)	Mindrevolutions (2005)

Professional ratings
Review scores
Source	Rating
AllMusic	4/5 stars

Keyholder is the seventh studio album by Swedish progressive rock band Kaipa. It is the second album of the reformed Kaipa line-up.

== Track listing ==
All songs by Hans Lundin and Roine Stolt except where noted.

No.	Title	Music	Length
1.	"Lifetime of a Journey"		8:14
2.	"A Complex Work of Art"		11:57
3.	"The Weed of All Mankind"		9:29
4.	"Sonic Pearls"	Fickling, Lundin	6:06
5.	"End of the Rope"		13:59
6.	"Across the Big Uncertain"		8:31
7.	"Distant Voices"		13:00
8.	"Otherworldly Brights"		7:09
Total length:			78:25

== Personnel ==
- Hans Lundin - Hammond organ, synthesizers, mellotron, pianos, vocals
- Roine Stolt - electric and acoustic guitars, percussion, vocals
- Morgan Ågren - drums
- Aleena Gibson - lead and backing vocals
- Patrik Lundström - lead and backing vocals
- Jonas Reingold - bass guitar
