= Kaipa (album) =

Studio album by Kaipa
- Released: 1975
- Recorded: February, July 1975
- Studio: Marcus Music Studios (Stockholm)
- Genre: Progressive rock, symphonic rock
- Length: 47:55
- Label: Decca

Kaipa chronology
Kaipa (1975)	Inget Nytt Under Solen (1976)

Kaipa is the first album by Swedish progressive rock band Kaipa, released in 1975, two years after the band formed.

== Track listing ==
1. "Musiken är ljuset (English: The Music Is the Light)" (Hans Lundin, Roine Stolt) – 7:04
2. "Saker har två sidor (English: Things Have Two Sides)" (Hans Lundin) – 4:34
3. "Ankaret (English: The Anchor)" (Hans Lundin) – 8:40
4. "Skogspromenad (English: Forest Walk)" (Hans Lundin) – 3:40
5. "Allting har en början (English: Everything Has a Beginning)" (Hans Lundin) – 3:12
6. "Se var morgon gry (English: See Every Morning Dawn)" (Hans Lundin) – 8:53
7. "Förlorad i Istanbul (English: Lost in Istanbul) " (Roine Stolt) – 2:24
8. "Oceaner föder liv (English: Oceans Give Birth to Life) " (Roine Stolt) – 9:28

=== Bonus Tracks Included On "The Decca Years" ===
9. "Från det ena till det andra (English: From One to Another)" (Roine Stolt) - 2:49
10. "Karavan (English: Caravan)" (Roine Stolt) - 2:54

== Personnel ==
- Roine Stolt - electric and acoustic guitars, backing vocals
- Hans Lundin - Hammond organ, lead vocals, Fender Rhodes and grand pianos, Yamaha SY1 synthesizer, harpsichord, Logan string-machine, glockenspiel
- Tomas Eriksson - bass, backing vocals
- Ingemar Bergman - drums, backing vocals, percussion

Recording Personnel

- Marcus Österdahl: Engineer
