= Inget nytt under solen =

Album by Kaipa

Studio album by Kaipa
- Released: 1976
- Recorded: June–August 1976; Marcus Music Studios Solna
- Genre: Progressive rock
- Length: 39:57
- Label: Decca
- Producer: Kaipa, Leif Mases

Kaipa chronology
| Kaipa (1975) | Inget nytt under solen (1976) | Solo (1978) |

Inget nytt under solen is the second album by Swedish Progressive rock band Kaipa, released in 1976. The album title translates to Nothing New Under the Sun.

Comparing the album with the band's 1975 self-titled debut album, Prog described Inget nytt under solen as "a considerable improvement."

== Track listing ==
| No. | Title | Music | English translation | Length |
|---|---|---|---|---|
| 1. | "Skenet bedrar": Uppvaknande; Bitterheten; Hoppfullheten; Överheten; Vilseledd" | Hans Lundin | Appearances Are Deceptive: Awakening; Bitterness; Hopefulness; Powerful; Misled | 21:41: 2:43; 3:10; 4:44; 8:12; 2:52 |
| 2. | "Ömson sken" | Ingemar Bergman, Roine Stolt | Sometimes Right | 3:17 |
| 3. | "Korståg" | Roine Stolt | Crusade | 5:19 |
| 4. | "Stengrodornas parad" | Stolt | The Parade of the Stonefrogs | 0:56 |
| 5. | "Dagens port" | Lundin | Today Door | 2:34 |
| 6. | "Inget nytt under solen" | Stolt | Nothing New Under the Sun | 6:10 |
| Total length: | | | | 39:57 |

== Personnel ==
- Ingemar Bergman: Drums, Temple Blocks, Rattle & Vocals
- Tomas Eriksson: Bass, Synth-Bass & Voice Of The Almighty
- Hans Lundin: Hammond Organ, Grand Piano, Fender Rhodes Electric Piano, Mellotron, Yamaha & Korg Synthesizers, Logan String Machine, Hohner Clavinet, Vibes, Marimba, Prepared Piano & Lead Vocal
- Roine Stolt: Electric Guitar, 6 and 12-String Acoustic Guitar & Rattle
- Lars Hoflund: Lead Vocal on Tracks 7, 9 & 10
- Kevin Fickling: Interpretation to English tracks 7–10

=== Bonus Tracks Included On "The Decca Years" ===
Vocals recorded at "Bastun Studio" Stockholm in October 1977

7. "Awakening/Bitterness" (Kevin Fickling, Hans Lundin) - 6:10
8. "How Might I Say Out Clearly" (Kevin Fickling, Ingemar Bergman, Roine Stolt) - 3:38
9. "The Gate of Day" (Kevin Fickling, Hans Lundin) - 2:26
10. "Blow Hard All Tradewinds" (Kevin Fickling, Roine Stolt) - 6:18

=== Bonus Tracks on the Musea release ===
Same as above plus

11. "Skenet bedrar" (Live) - 14:08
12. "Fran det ena till det andra" - 2:47
