= Hulkoff =

Swedish musician

- Born: Kurt Pär Einar Hulkoff; 25 August 1980 (age 45); Karungi, Sweden
- Genres: Power metal, folk metal, heavy metal, industrial metal
- Occupation: Musician
- Instruments: Vocals, guitar
- Years active: 2009–present
- Member of: Raubtier, Atomkraft, Bourbon Boys, Scythikon, Hulkoff

Pär Hulkoff (born 25 August 1980), known by his stage name Hulkoff, is a Swedish musician. His first releases were as the lead singer and guitarist for the industrial metal band Raubtier in 2009, and then country rock group Bourbon Boys.

Since 2017, he has been active as a solo artist, making Nordic folk influenced power metal and later folk metal under the name Hulkoff. Hulkoff's solo sound has been compared to that of fellow power metal band Sabaton. In fact he featured their lead singer, Joakim Brodén, on his 2017 album Kven.

== Works and style ==
Hulkoff's original band was Raubtier. They released their first album, Det finns bara krig, in 2009. He released his first country-rock album with Bourbon Boys, Shotguns, Trucks & Cattle, in 2013. The album was praised for its 'fast and catchy' tunes with 'whisky-soaked vocals'.

Hulkoff's first solo record Kven was released in 2017. It received more mixed reviews, with some critics praising its 'formidable force' as 'true warrior metal'. However, others noted the fairly conventional song structure and 'genre-typical melodies' in some parts. That same year, Hulkoff also contributed a country-rock song, entitled These Guns, to the soundtrack of the flight simulator video game Flying Tigers: Shadows Over China.

In early 2020 he released a new solo single, Ingvar, which he revealed was from an upcoming album entitled Pansarfolk. The album will be released in two editions, one with the lyrics sung in English and the other in Swedish. Pansarfolk was released on 25 September and sold out of all physical copies on pre-order alone. It hit number one on the Swedish heavy metal album charts during the first week of release. Anders Johannsson, former drummer with HammerFall and now ManOWar, features on most tracks on the album. It also includes more traditional Nordic instrumentation than previous Hulkoff albums, including the Talharpa and the Nyckelharpa.

Early reviewers called Pansarfolk "fighting folk metal, full of fervour and a primal passion that comes from the woods of northern Sweden" and "like The Devil Went Down to Georgia on power metal steroids"

== Personal life ==
Hulkoff started his interest in music around age nine, and he can sing fluently in both his native Swedish and English. In his life outside of music, Hulkoff is a keen hunter and outdoorsman.
