= Notes from the Past (Kaipa album) =

Notes From The Past

Studio album by Kaipa
- Released: April 25, 2002
- Genre: Progressive rock
- Length: 79:07
- Label: InsideOut Music
- Producer: Hans Lundin

Kaipa chronology
Stockholm Symphonie (1993)	Notes From The Past (2002)	Keyholder (2003)

Professional ratings
Review scores
Source	Rating
Allmusic	2.5/5 stars

Notes from the Past is the sixth studio album by Swedish progressive rock band Kaipa. It is also the band's first release in twenty years, this time with a renewed lineup and with the return of guitarist Roine Stolt.

== Track listing ==
All songs by Hans Lundin except where noted.

No.	Title	Music	Length
1.	"Notes from the Past, Part 1"		3:09
2.	"Night-Bike-Ride (On Lilac Street)"		3:28
3.	"Mirrors of Yesterday"		6:17
4.	"Leaving the Horizon"		14:10
5.	"In the Space of a Twinkle"	Amat	3:27
6.	"Folke's Final Decision"		4:03
7.	"The Name Belongs to You"		13:46
8.	"Second Journey Inside the Green Glass"		5:55
9.	"A Road in My Mind"		7:17
10.	"Morganism"		10:33
11.	"Notes from the Past, Part 2"		6:58
Total length:			79:07

== Personnel ==
- Hans Lundin - keyboards
- Roine Stolt - guitars, vocals
- Morgan Ågren - drums
- Patrik Lundström - lead vocals
- Jonas Reingold - bass guitar
- Aleena Gibson - additional vocals
- Tove Thörn Lundin - additional vocals
