= Scar Symmetry =

Swedish melodic death metal band

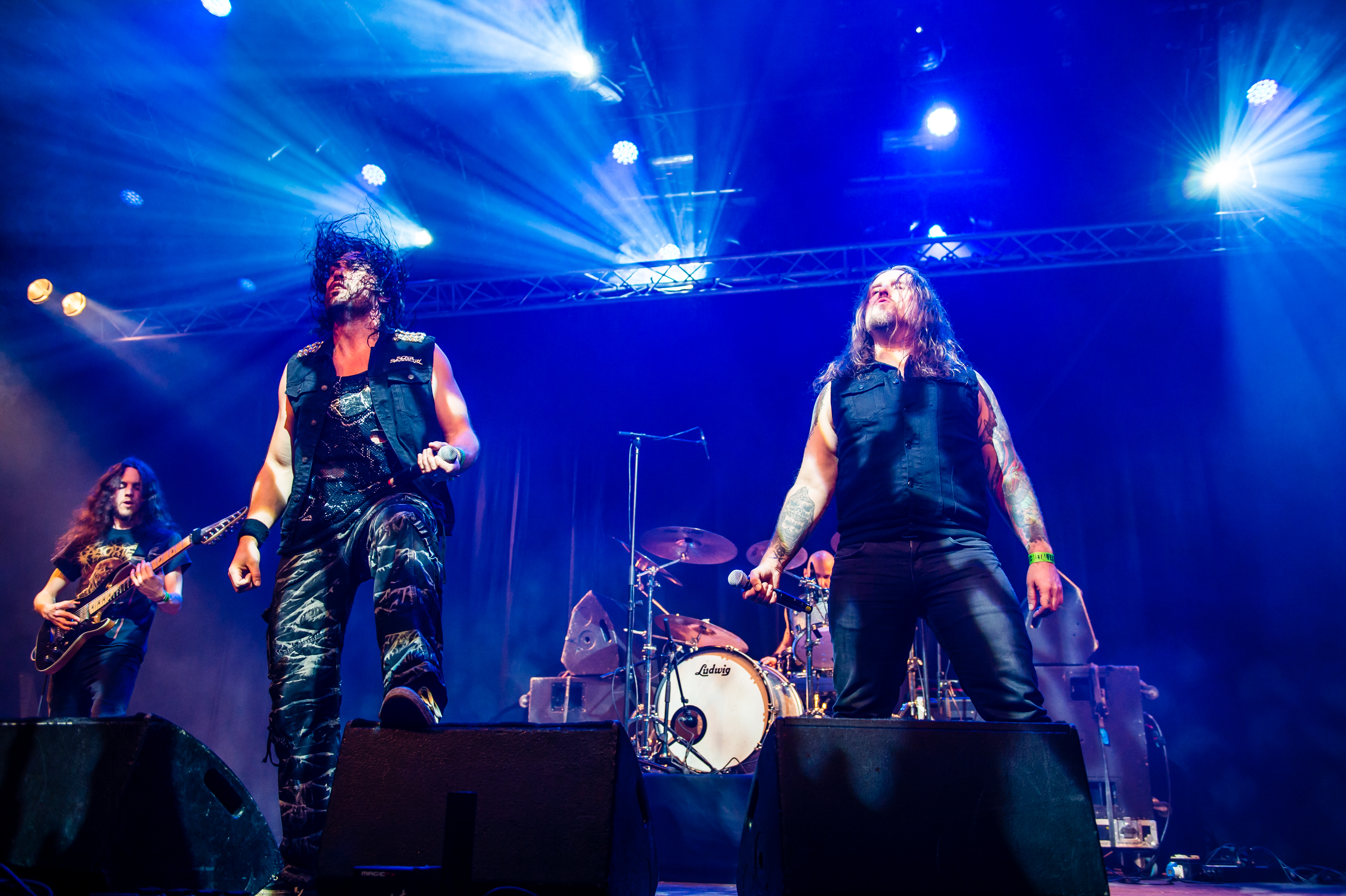
- Scar Symmetry at the Epic Metal Fest in Eindhoven, 2015

Background information
- Origin: Avesta, Sweden
- Genres: Melodic death metal; progressive metal; power metal
- Years active: 2004−present
- Labels: Nuclear Blast, Metal Blade
- Members: Per Nilsson; Roberth Karlsson; Lars Palmqvist; Lawrence Dinamarca; Stephen Platt
- Past members: Henrik Ohlsson; Benjamin Ellis; Jonas Kjellgren; Christian Älvestam; Kenneth Seil; Andreas Holma
- Website: Scar Symmetry on Facebook

Scar Symmetry is a Swedish melodic death metal band from Avesta, formed in 2004. The band has released seven albums, with seven released singles. They are signed to Nuclear Blast Records.

== History ==
=== Formation and Symmetric in Design (2004−2005) ===
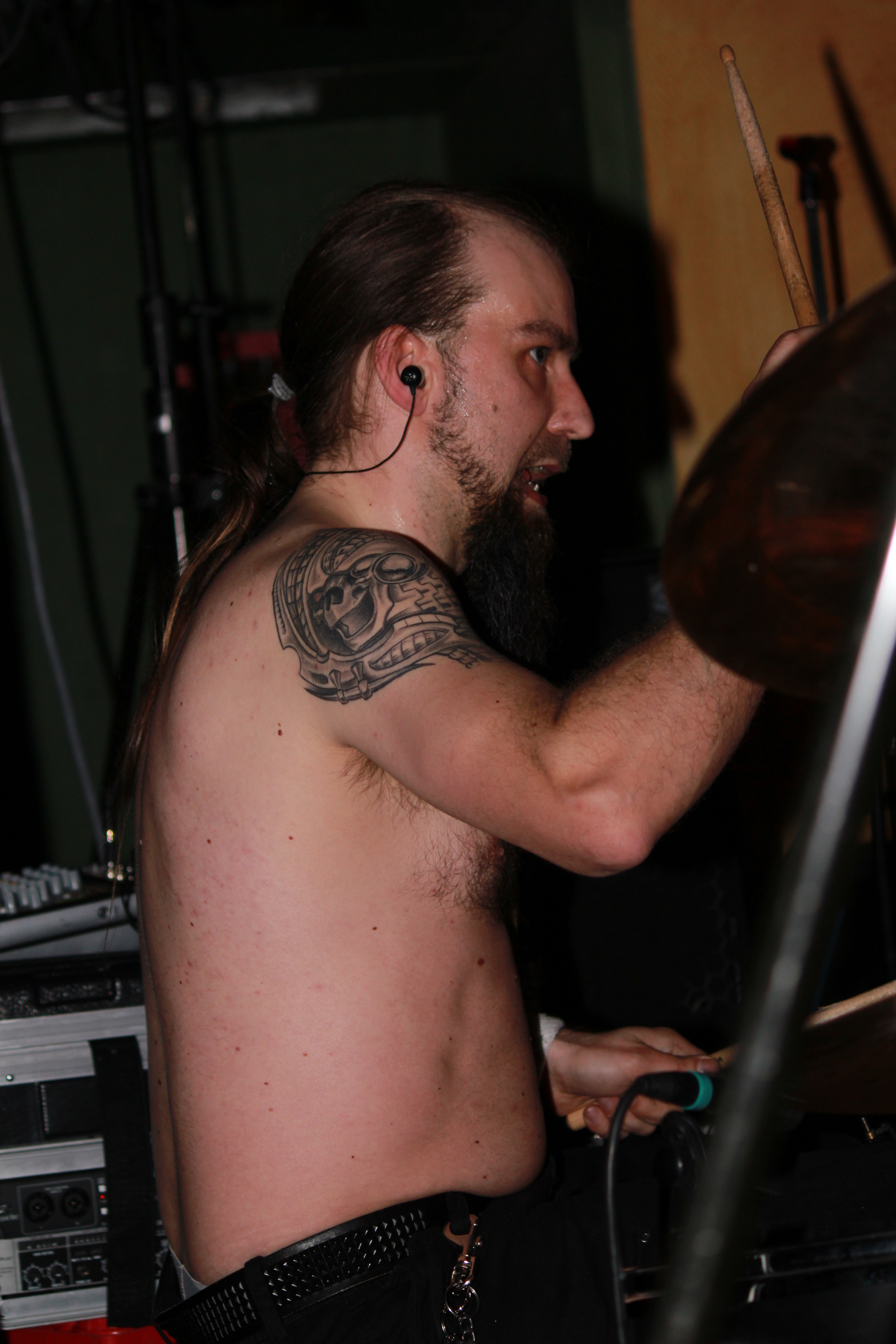
Drummer Henrik Ohlsson was the band's main lyricist until his departure in 2024.

Formed in April 2004, Scar Symmetry came together during the band Altered Aeon's recording session at Jonas Kjellgren's Black Lounge Studios by guitarists Jonas Kjellgren, Per Nilsson and drummer Henrik Ohlsson. That same month, vocalist Christian Älvestam and bassist Kenneth Seil joined the band, which then recorded a demo for the song "Seeds of Rebellion" which helped the band get a recording contract with Cold Records (a subsidiary of Metal Blade Records).

In July 2004, the band entered Black Lounge Studios to begin recording its debut album, Symmetric in Design. It followed it up by playing festivals in Europe, as well as touring with Soilwork, Hypocrisy, and One Man Army.

=== Pitch Black Progress (2006−2007) ===
In June 2006, the band signed a new record deal with Nuclear Blast records. Eight months after the release of Symmetric in Design the band started recording its follow-up, Pitch Black Progress. The band again followed up its recording by touring, this time with Communic for the Waves of Pitch Black Decay Tour 2006 throughout Europe, and they toured North America with melodic death metal pioneers Dark Tranquillity and The Haunted. The song "The Illusionist" began receiving air-play on MTV2's Headbangers Ball. In September 2007, the band embarked on another North American tour with headliners Katatonia, Insomnium, and Swallow the Sun, the "Live Consternation Tour".

=== Holographic Universe and new vocalists (2008−2009) ===
The band's third album, Holographic Universe, was released on 20 June 2008. Following the release, despite an outpouring of good reviews and press for the album as well as the success of the single for "Morphogenesis", Scar Symmetry did not embark on tours. The band released a statement on 11 September 2008 announcing that they had fired vocalist Christian Älvestam, due to touring conflicts, creative and personal differences. On 6 October, they announced the replacements for Älvestam; they would continue with two singers, Roberth Karlsson (growls and clean backing vocals) and Lars Palmqvist (clean vocals and backing growls), and began touring in support of the new album in December.

=== Dark Matter Dimensions (2009−2010) ===
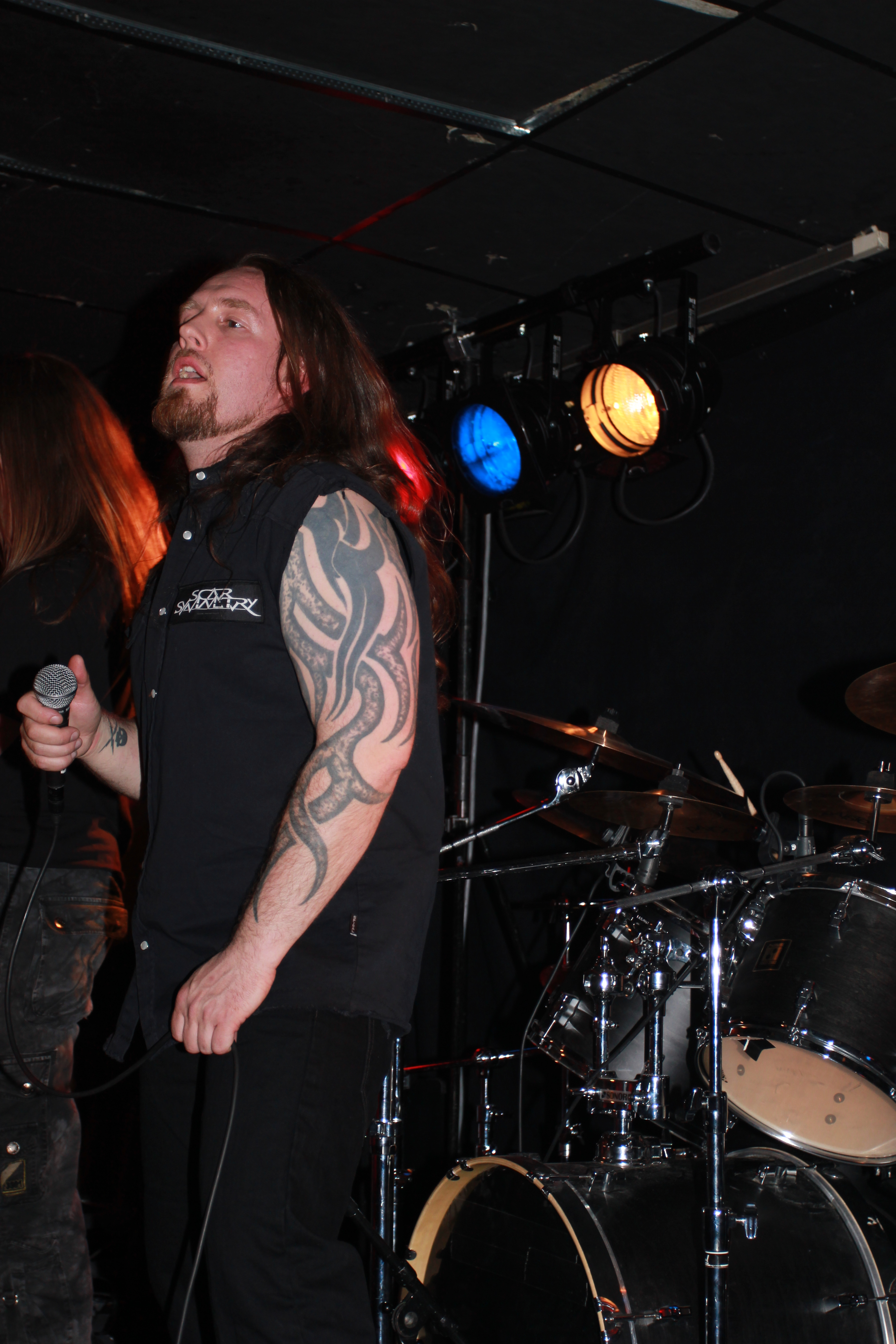
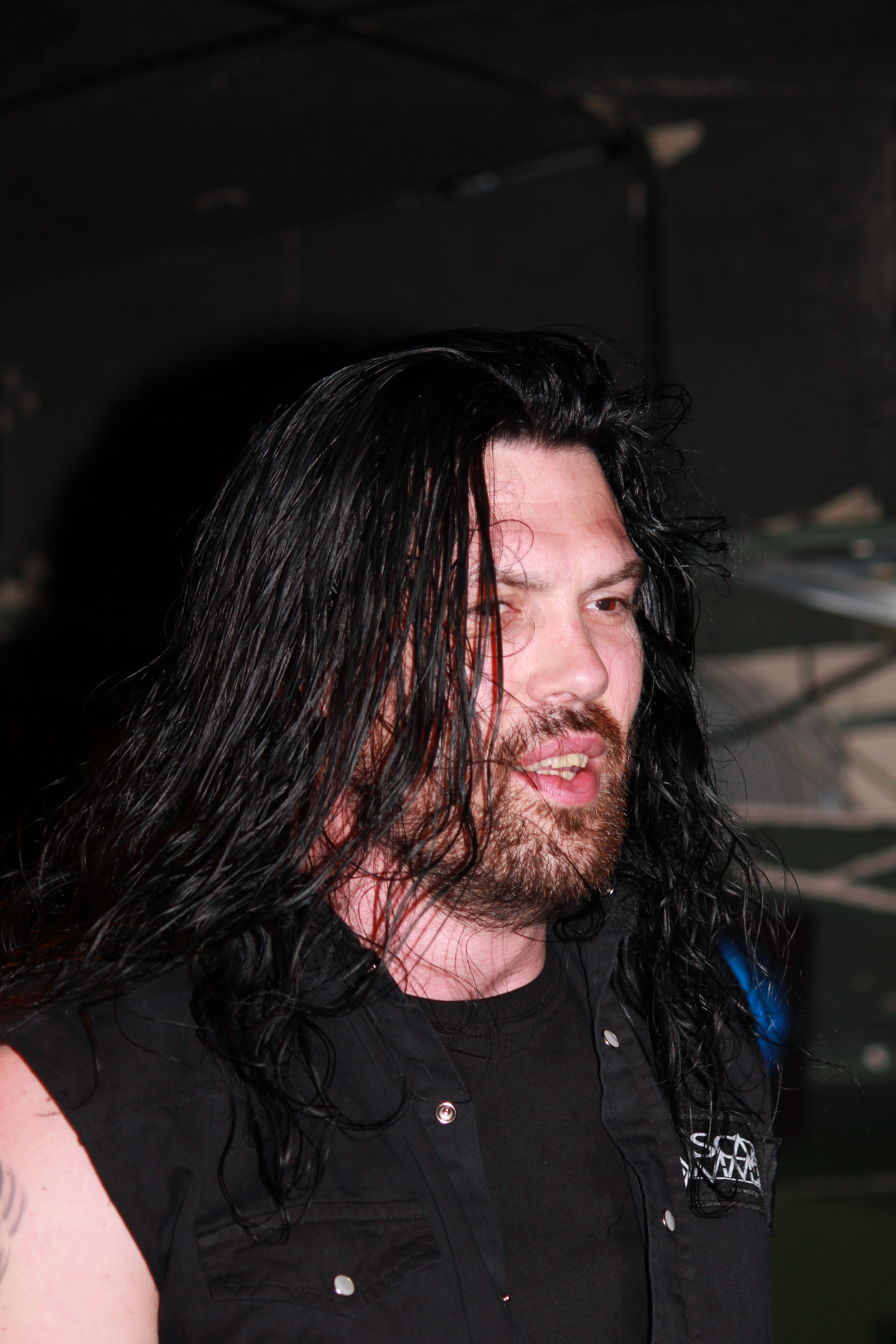
Vocalists Roberth Karlsson and Lars Palmqvist joined the band in 2008 after the departure of Christian Älvestam.

The band's fourth album, Dark Matter Dimensions, was released on 2 October 2009 in Europe, and on 20 October 2009 in the US. It is the band's first album to feature new vocalists Karlsson and Palmqvist. Despite the replacement of previous singer, the album received generally positive reviews upon its release. A music video was filmed for the songs "Noumenon & Phenomenon", "Ascension Chamber" and "The Iconoclast".

From late October 2009, Scar Symmetry took part in the Neckbreakers Ball Tour alongside Behemoth, DevilDriver and Arsis. In February 2010, Scar Symmetry announced that they were to support head-liners Hypocrisy at the "A Taste of Extreme Divinity" tour. Towards the end of 2010, they toured with Epica in the United States and Canada, starting in West Springfield, Virginia, on 16 November, and finishing in Raleigh, North Carolina, on 18 December.

=== The Unseen Empire (2011−2013) ===
Scar Symmetry's fifth album, titled The Unseen Empire, was released in Europe on 18 April 2011. Drummer Henrik Ohlsson states that the title of the album "seeks to expose the hidden hand of the elite that pull the strings of mankind in order to fulfill their agenda of global domination". The album is the band's best-selling yet in the United States in terms of first-week sales. It sold 1,500 copies, landing it at number 11 on the Billboard Heatseekers Chart. The band unofficially started to write their next record. In August 2013, the band announced that guitarist Jonas Kjellgren had left the band due to scheduling conflicts with his studio work and his other bands Raubtier and Bourbon Boys. Kjellgren has not been replaced officially, but his place is occasionally taken by session guitarists for live shows.

=== The Singularity trilogy (2014−present) ===
On 20 January 2014, the band announced that they were working on a trilogy of albums, all revolving around the theme of transhumanism. The artwork for the first in the series of albums, The Singularity (Phase I – Neohumanity) was revealed on the same day, along with a short clip of a pre-production demo for the new album. This album marks the first Scar Symmetry album to be produced, mixed and mastered entirely by Per Nilsson.

==== Phase I − Neohumanity ====
The band explained that the first part of the trilogy would be centred on the rise of "artilects (artificial intellects) with mental capacities far above the human level of thought" and that "by the year 2030, one of the world's biggest industries will be 'artificial brains,' used to control artilects that will be genuinely intelligent and useful." As well as this, the lyrical content will focus on the divide between "those who embrace the new technology and those who oppose it" due to the social issues caused by the rise of artificial intelligence and the emergence of transhumanists adding artilect technology to their own bodies.

==== Phase II − Xenotaph ====
On 9 January 2015, Scar Symmetry announced that vocalist Roberth Karlsson had a child on the way, so the band would not do any touring until the fall of 2015, at the earliest. In the meantime, throughout 2015, Per Nilsson and Henrik Ohlsson would be writing Phase II of the planned album trilogy. Jokingly, they stated that the album would be entitled, Phase II: The Force Awakens, but then later clarified that the actual album title would be "much cooler", and did not want to risk a lawsuit over naming their album after the new Disney owned Star Wars film. On 16 November, announcements were made to enter the studio and record Phase II after finishing the tour the week after. On 7 December, Phase II has just started being recorded. In February 2017, via their Facebook page, Scar Symmetry announced that album will be released in 2017. On 29 October 2018, the band announced full title of the seventh album as The Singularity (Phase II – Xenotaph).

On 12 March 2019, Scar Symmetry announced that bassist Andreas Holma had resigned from the band, due to a touring dispute.

The first single promoting the album, "Scorched Quadrant" was released on 30 March 2023, with an accompanying music video released the day after. Along with the single, the band announced the release of the album for 9 June 2023.

On 28 March 2024, Scar Symmetry announced that founding member and drummer Henrik Olsson as well as guitarist Benjamin Ellis had both departed from the band. At the same time they also announced that Lawrence Dinamarca and Stephen Platt would be taking over on drums and guitar respectively. Dinamarca had been touring with the band since 2022 as the band's live drummer after Olsson was unable to return to touring due to "family reasons".

== Band members ==
=== Current ===
- Per Nilsson – lead guitar, keyboards, backing and clean vocals, bass (2004–present)
- Roberth Karlsson – harsh vocals (2008–present)
- Lars Palmqvist – clean vocals (2008–present)
- Stephen Platt – rhythm guitar (2024–present)
- Lawrence Dinamarca – drums (2024–present)

=== Former ===
- Henrik Ohlsson – drums (2004–2024)
- Jonas Kjellgren – rhythm guitar, keyboards, backing vocals (2004–2013)
- Kenneth Seil – bass (2004–2015)
- Christian Älvestam – lead vocals (2004–2008)
- Benjamin Ellis – rhythm guitar, backing and clean vocals (2016–2024)
- Andreas Holma – bass, backing and clean vocals (2016–2019)

=== Session ===
- Andreas Silén – bass (2015)
- Fredrik Groth – rhythm guitar, bass (2012–2014)

== Discography ==
=== Demos ===
- Seeds of Rebellion (2004)

=== Studio albums ===
- Symmetric in Design (2005)
- Pitch Black Progress (2006)
- Holographic Universe (2008)
- Dark Matter Dimensions (2009)
- The Unseen Empire (2011)
- The Singularity (Phase I – Neohumanity) (2014)
- The Singularity (Phase II – Xenotaph) (2023)
