= Solo (Kaipa album) =

Studio album by Kaipa
- Released: 1978
- Recorded: December 1977
- Studio: Europa Film Studios, Stockholm
- Genre: Progressive rock
- Length: 50:13
- Label: Decca
- Producer: Kaipa, Olle Ramm

Kaipa chronology
Inget Nytt Under Solen (1976)	Solo (1978)	Händer (1980)

Solo is the third studio album by the Swedish progressive rock band Kaipa. It was released in 1978 by Decca Records.

== Track listing ==
1994 remastered edition

1. "Den skrattande grevinnan" (Roine Stolt) – 4:46
2. "Sen repris" (Mats Löfgren, Roine Stolt) – 3:22
3. "Flytet" (Roine Stolt) – 2:46
4. "Anar dig" (Mats Löfgren, Roine Stolt) – 4:05
5. "Frog Funk" (Roine Stolt) – 3:35
6. "Visan i sommaren" (Hans Lundin) – 3:35
7. "Tajgan" (Hans Lundin) – 3:25
8. "Respektera min värld" (Mats Löfgren, Hans Lundin, Ingemar Bergman) – 6:16
9. "En igelkotts död" (Hans Lundin) – 3:40
10. "Total förvirring" (Mats Löfgren, Roine Stolt) – 7:25
11. "Sist på plan" (Mats Löfgren, Roine Stolt) – 7:38
12. "Visan i sommaren (Live) (Bonus Track on Musea) - 3:31
13. "En igelkotts dod/Omsom sken (Medley) (Live) (Bonus Track on Musea) - 4:40
14. "Live in an Elevator (Bonus Track on Musea) - 10:34

== Personnel ==
Adapted from the album's liner notes.

- Ingemar Bergman: Drums, Percussion & Laughing
- Mats Lindberg: Bass, Moog Taurus Pedals & Percussion
- Hans Lundin: Hammond Organ, Fender Rhodes Electric Piano, Grand Piano, Mellotron, Mini and Polymoog Synths, Korg String 2000, Hohner Clavinet & Vocal
- Roine Stolt: 6 and 12-String Electric Guitars, Acoustic Guitars, guitar-Synthesizer, Percussion & Vocal
- Mats Löfgren: Lead Vocal & Percussion
- Engineered By Olle Ramm
