= Ad Perpetuam Memoriam =

Swedish independent record label

Ad Perpetuam Memoriam (APM) was an independent record label based in Borlänge, Sweden.

The label releases a mixture of musical styles, in the area of progressive rock and symphonic rock Artists on APM include Death Organ, Höyry-kone, Catweazle.

== Discography ==
APM9201 Kultivator: Barndomens stigar (Swe)
APM9302 Myrbein: Myrornas krig (Swe)
APM9403 AT Ensemble Nimbus: Key Figures (Swe)
APM9404 Jasun Martz: The Pillory (USA)
APM9405/SYMPHILIS1 Zaragon: No Return (Den)
APM9506 AT/Ad INFERNOS1 Death Organ: 9 to 5 (Swe)
APM9507/SYMPHILIS2 Akasha: Akasha (Nor)
APM9508/SYMPHILIS3 Atlas: Blå Vardag (Swe)
APM9509 AT Simon Steensland: The Zombie Hunter (Swe)
APM9510 AT Höyry-Kone: Hyönteisiä Voi Rakastaa
APM9511 Eskaton: 4 Visions (Fra)
APM9612 AT/SYMPHILIS4 Catweazle: Ars Moriendi (Swe)
APM9613 AT/SYMPHILIS5 In The Labyrinth: The Garden Of Mysteries (Swe)
APM9614 AT/SYMPHILIS6 Zello: Zello (Swe)
APM9715 Tömrerclaus: Same (Den)
APM9616 AT Evidence: Heart's Grave (Fra)
APM9717 /SYMPHILIS7 Blåkulla: Blåkulla (Swe)
APM9718 AT/AD INFERNOS2 Death Organ: Universal Stripsearch (Swe)
APM9720 AT Höyry-Kone: Huono Parturi (Fin)

Due to limited finances APM9719 was never released.

== See also ==
- List of record labels
