= In the Wake of Evolution =

Studio album by Kaipa
- Released: March 15, 2010 (Europe); March 16, 2010 (US)
- Recorded: 2008–2009; HGL Studio, Uppsala, Sweden
- Genre: Progressive rock
- Length: 70:03
- Label: Inside Out Music
- Producer: Hans Lundin

Kaipa chronology
Angling Feelings (2007)	In the Wake of Evolution (2010)	Vittjar (2012)

In the Wake of Evolution is the tenth full-length album by progressive rock band Kaipa.

== Track listing ==
1. "In the Wake of Evolution" - 10:57
2. "In the Heart of Her Own Magic Field" - 5:12
3. "Electric Power Water Notes" - 17:51
4. "Folkia's First Decision" - 2:33
5. "The Words Are Like Leaves" - 5:36
6. "Arcs of Sound" - 8:22
7. "Smoke from a Secret Source" - 9:24
8. "The Seven Oceans of Our Mind" - 10:08

== Personnel ==
- Patrik Lundström - vocals
- Aleena Gibson - vocals
- Per Nilsson - electric and acoustic guitars
- Morgan Ågren - drums
- Hans Lundin - electric and acoustic keyboards, vocals
- Jonas Reingold - electric basses
- Fredrik Lindqvist - recorders (tracks 2, 3, 4, 5, & 8)
- Elin Rubinsztein - violin (tracks 1, 4, 5, & 7)
