= Sattyg =

Studio album by Kaipa
- Released: November 10, 2014
- Recorded: 2013–2014; HGL Studio, Uppsala, Sweden
- Genre: Progressive rock
- Length: 68:58
- Label: Inside Out Music
- Producer: Hans Lundin

Kaipa chronology
Vittjar (2012)	Sattyg (2014)

Sattyg is the twelfth full-length album by progressive rock band Kaipa.

== Track listing ==
1. "A Map of Your Secret World" - 15:02
2. "World of the Void" - 7:49
3. "Screwed-Upness" - 13:06
4. "Sattyg" - 3:13
5. "A Sky Full of Painters" - 14:42
6. "Unique When We Fall" - 5:17
7. "Without Time - Beyond Time" - 9:49

== Personnel ==
- Patrik Lundström - vocals
- Aleena Gibson - vocals
- Per Nilsson - electric and acoustic guitars
- Morgan Ågren - drums
- Hans Lundin - keyboards and vocals
- Jonas Reingold - electric basses
- Fredrik Lindqvist - recorders and whistles (tracks 1, 3, 4, & 6)
- Elin Rubinsztein - violin (tracks 3, 4, & 5)
