= Symmetric in Design =

Symmetric In Design

Studio album by Scar Symmetry
- Released: 7 February 2005
- Recorded: July – September 2004
- Studio: Black Lounge Studios, Avesta, Sweden
- Genre: Melodic death metal
- Length: 48:36
- Label: Cold/Metal Blade (Europe); Nuclear Blast (U.S.); Soundholic (Japan)

Scar Symmetry chronology
Symmetric In Design (2005)	Pitch Black Progress (2006)

Singles from Symmetric in Design
- 1. "Seeds of Rebellion" Released: 2004

Alternative cover
- Japanese release

Professional ratings
Review scores
Source	Rating
Allmusic	3/5 stars

Symmetric in Design is the debut studio album by Swedish melodic death metal band Scar Symmetry. Symmetric in Design was recorded during July through September 2004 at Black Lounge Studios, Avesta, Sweden. Symmetric in Design was released on 7 February 2005 in Europe, 6 September 2005 in the United States and 25 April 2005 in Japan.

== Track listing ==
All lyrics written by Henrik Ohlsson.

No.	Title	Music	Length
1.	"Chaosweaver"	Jonas Kjellgren	3:40
2.	"2012 – The Demise of the 5th Sun"	Per Nilsson	3:51
3.	"Dominion"	Per Nilsson	3:26
4.	"Underneath the Surface"	Jonas Kjellgren	3:50
5.	"Reborn"	Per Nilsson	3:58
6.	"Veil of Illusions"	Jonas Kjellgren	5:06
7.	"Obscure Alliance"	Jonas Kjellgren	3:42
8.	"Hybrid Cult"	Jonas Kjellgren; Christian Älvestam	5:00
9.	"Orchestrate the Infinite"	Per Nilsson	4:07
10.	"Detach from the Outcome"	Per Nilsson	3:25
11.	"Seeds of Rebellion"	Jonas Kjellgren	3:12
12.	"The Eleventh Sphere"	Jonas Kjellgren	5:19
Total length:			48:36

== Credits ==
=== Scar Symmetry ===
- Christian Älvestam – vocals
- Jonas Kjellgren – rhythm guitar, keyboards, mixing, engineering
- Per Nilsson – lead guitar, keyboards, engineering
- Henrik Ohlsson – drums
- Kenneth Seil – bass guitar

=== Other personnel ===
- Thomas Johansson – mastering
- Pär Johansson – artwork, layout, logo
- John Allan – photography

== Release history ==
Country	Release date
Europe	7 February 2005
Japan	25 April 2005
United States	6 September 2005
