= Carnal Forge =

Swedish thrash metal band

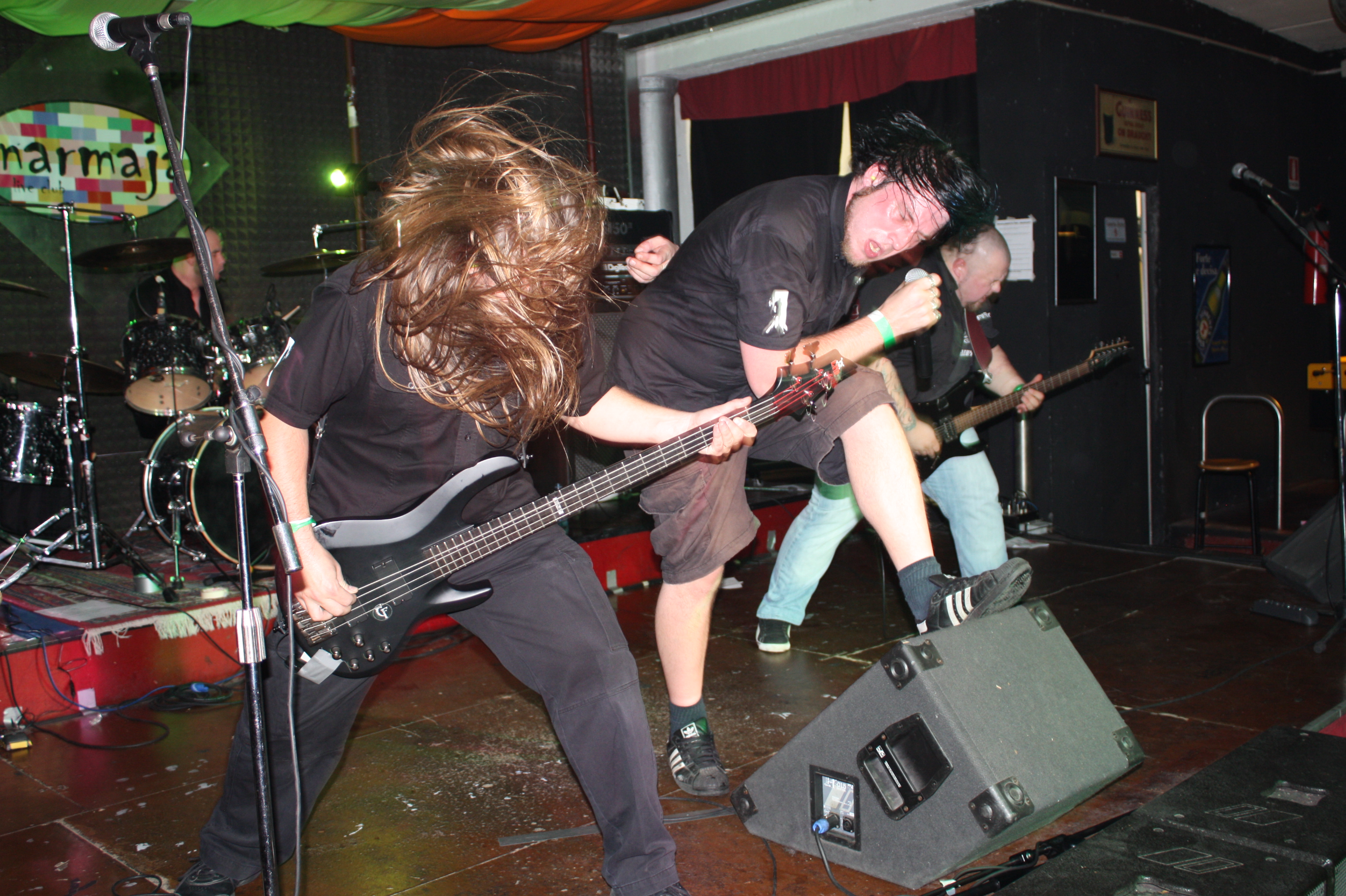
- Carnal Forge in 2009

Background information
- Origin: Sala, Sweden
- Genres: Melodic death metal; thrash metal
- Years active: 1997–2010, 2013–present
- Labels: WAR Music, Relapse, Century Media, Candlelight
- Members: Petri Kuusisto; Lars Lindén; Lawrence Dinamarca; Tommie Wahlberg
- Past members: Stefan Westerberg; Jari Kuusisto; Jonas Kjellgren; Johan Magnusson; Dennis Vestman; Jens C. Mortensen; Peter Tuthill; Dino Medanhodzic; Chris Barkensjö
- Website: carnalforge.com

Carnal Forge are a Swedish band, best classified as thrash metal with some melodic death metal influences. Their name originates from a song on Carcass's album Heartwork.

== History ==
Carnal Forge was founded in Sala in 1997 by Jari Kuusisto and Stefan Westerberg as a side project to their band In Thy Dreams. They released their debut album Who's Gonna Burn (War Music) in 1998, then signed with Century Media Records in 2000 and recorded Firedemon (2000) and Please... Die! (2001).

In 2000, guitarist Johan Magnusson left and bassist Petri Kuusisto took his place. Lars Lindén replaced Petri on bass and made his debut at the 2000 Decibel Festival in Bengtsfors, Sweden and at the Wacken Open Air Festival in Wacken, Germany. Around this time, the band went on tour across Europe with The Haunted and Nile. The releases of The More You Suffer (2003) and Aren't You Dead Yet? (2004) came just prior to the departure of vocalist Jonas Kjellgren just prior to the band's European tour with Pro-Pain. Jens C. Mortensen was chosen as their new vocalist in a matter of days.

In addition to Europe, the band also toured the USA and Japan and played a number of festivals, including the Sweden Rock Festival, Metal Meltdown (USA), Fury Fest, Pressure Festival (Germany), Kaltenbach Open Air (Austria) Summer Breeze Open Air, and Fuck the Commerce (Germany). They released a 2004 DVD "Destroy Live" of concerts in New York City, Kraków, and Tokyo. In January 2007, the band signed to Candlelight Records and released the album Testify for My Victims later that year. Owe Lingvall, who the band had worked with before on previous music videos, directed the videos for "Burning Eden" and "Numb (The Dead)," both of which were filmed in Umeå, Sweden.

In November 2007, Mortensen and Jari left the band because they were "fed up with the music industry;" other Carnal Forge members were grappling with personal problems too. Dino Medanhodzic (guitar) of Construcdead and Peter Tuthill (vocals) of Soulbreach were brought in to replace them. In September 2009, they released their next album's first single, "Blood War," and filmed the music video the next month. It was edited by Tuthill and mixed by Medanhodzic, then released the following summer. Not long after, in January 2010, Westerberg left the band and was replaced by Chris Barkensjö. In 2011, Lindén announced the band would be taking an indefinite hiatus for personal reasons and because they "weren't having much fun anymore." They reunited in 2013; Mortensen and Jari returned and Lawrence Dinamarca joined on drums. They released a single, "When All Else Fails," in 2014. Mortensen became a father and withdrew from the band again in 2015 while recording their next album. He was replaced by Tommie Wahlberg. In 2018, after a 12-year hiatus, Carnal Forge released Gun to Mouth Salvation, its seventh album, with ViciSolum Production. Jari departed again in January 2022.

== Band members ==
=== Current members ===
- Petri Kuusisto – lead guitar (2000–2010, 2013–present); rhythm guitar (2022–present), bass (2000, 2025–present)
- Tommie Wahlberg – vocals (2018–present)

=== Former members ===
- Stefan Westerberg – drums (1997–2010)
- Jari Kuusisto – rhythm guitar (1997–2008, 2013–2022)
- Jonas Kjellgren – vocals (1997–2004)
- Johan Magnusson – guitars (1997–2000)
- Dennis Vestman – bass (1997–2000)
- Lars Lindén – bass (2001–2010, 2013–2025; his death)
- Jens C. Mortensen – vocals (2004–2007, 2013–2018)
- Peter Tuthill – vocals (2008–2010)
- Dino Medanhodzic – guitar (2008–2010)
- Chris Barkensjö – drums (2010)
- Lawrence Dinamarca – drums (2013–2023)

== Discography ==
Title	Release date	Label
Sweet Bride	1997	Demo
Who's Gonna Burn	22 September 1998	WAR Music/Relapse Records
Firedemon	14 April 2000	Century Media
Please... Die!	22 October 2001	Century Media
The More You Suffer	22 April 2003	Century Media
Aren't You Dead Yet?	21 June 2004	Century Media
Testify for My Victims	21 May 2007	Candlelight Records
Gun to Mouth Salvation	25 January 2019	ViciSolum Productions

=== Videography ===
Title	Release date	Label
Destroy Live	2004	Metal Mind Productions
