= Vittjar =

Studio album by Kaipa
- Released: August 28, 2012
- Recorded: 2011–2012; HGL Studio, Uppsala, Sweden
- Genre: Progressive rock
- Length: 68:39
- Label: Inside Out Music
- Producer: Hans Lundin

Kaipa chronology
In the Wake of Evolution (2010)	Vittjar (2012)	Sattyg (2014)

Vittjar is the eleventh full-length album by progressive rock band Kaipa.

== Track listing ==
No.	Title	Length
1.	"First Distraction"	3:00
2.	"Lightblue and Green"	11:59
3.	"Our Silent Ballroom Band"	22:08
4.	"Vittjar"	3:47
5.	"Treasure-House"	7:32
6.	"A Universe of Tinynes"	7:22
7.	"The Crowned Hillsides"	10:31
8.	"Second Distraction"	2:20
Total length:		68:39

== Reception ==
Louder rated the album 3.5 stars out of 5, calling it a "superb piece of folky, symphonic prog". Writing for Allmusic, Eduardo Rivadavia described it as "a rich, often Dali-esque musical canvas", and noted its stylistic diversity, labelling it as "compelling".

== Personnel ==
- Patrik Lundström - vocals
- Aleena Gibson - vocals
- Per Nilsson - electric and acoustic guitars
- Morgan Ågren - drums
- Hans Lundin - electric and acoustic keyboards, vocals
- Jonas Reingold - electric basses
- Fredrik Lindqvist - recorders and whistles (tracks 1, 2, 3, & 7)
- Elin Rubinsztein - violin (tracks 2, 4, 6, & 7)
