= Sonic Syndicate discography =

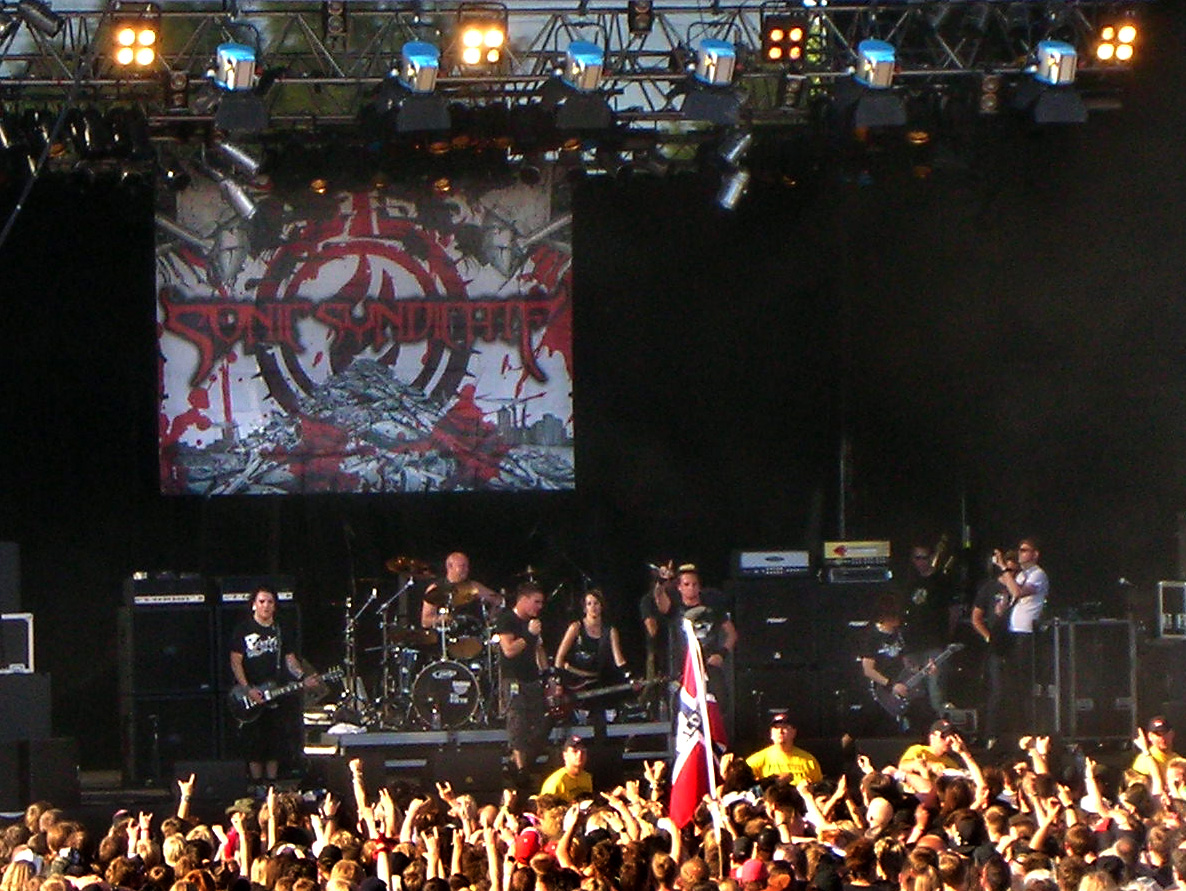
- Sonic Syndicate performing at 2008's Sweden Rock Festival.
- Studio albums: 6
- Extended plays: 1
- Live albums: 1
- Singles: 14
- Music videos: 20
- Demos: 4

Sonic Syndicate is a Swedish heavy metal band.

== Studio albums ==
Title	Release date	Label
Eden Fire	September 13, 2005	Pivotal Rockordings
Only Inhuman	May 22, 2007	Nuclear Blast
Love and Other Disasters	October 14, 2008	Nuclear Blast
We Rule the Night	August 27, 2010	Nuclear Blast
Sonic Syndicate	July 4, 2014	Nuclear Blast
Confessions	October 14, 2016	Despotz Records

== Extended plays ==
Title	Release date	Label
Burn This City	November 6, 2009	Nuclear Blast

== Live releases ==
Title	Release date	Label
Live Inhuman (Only Inhuman: Tour Edition DVD)	May 6, 2008	Nuclear Blast

== Singles ==
Year	Title	Album	Notes
2007	Psychic Suicide / Denied	Only Inhuman	
2007	Enclave / Flashback	Only Inhuman	
2008	Jack of Diamonds	Love and Other Disasters	
2008	My Escape	Love and Other Disasters	
2009	Burn This City	Burn This City	
2010	Revolution, Baby	We Rule the Night	
2010	My Own Life	We Rule the Night	
2010	Turn It Up	We Rule the Night	
2016	Start a War	Confessions	
2016	Confessions	Confessions	
2016	Start a War (Zardonic Remix)	Confessions	
2017	Still Believe	Confessions	
2017	Fire		PVRIS cover
2017	Treat You Better		Shawn Mendes cover

== Music videos ==
Year	Title	Album	Director
2006	Jailbreak	Eden Fire	Pivotal Rockordings
2006	Soulstone Splinter	Eden Fire	Pivotal Rockordings
2007	Denied	Only Inhuman	Patric Ullaeus
2007	Enclave	Only Inhuman	Patric Ullaeus
2008	Jack of Diamonds	Love and Other Disasters	Patric Ullaeus
2008	My Escape	Love and Other Disasters	Patric Ullaeus
2009	Power Shift	Love and Other Disasters	Marius Böttcher
2009	Contradiction	Love and Other Disasters	Marius Böttcher
2009	Burn This City	Burn This City	Patric Ullaeus
2010	Revolution, Baby	We Rule the Night	Patric Ullaeus
2010	My Own Life	We Rule the Night	Patric Ullaeus
2010	Turn It Up	We Rule the Night	Anders Rune
2014	Before You Finally Break	Sonic Syndicate	Patric Ullaeus
2014	Catching Fire	Sonic Syndicate	Sonic Syndicate
2015	Diabolical Work of Art	Sonic Syndicate	Sixteenbyninefilms
2015	Black Hole Halo	Sonic Syndicate	
2016	Confessions	Confessions	Rob F. Blom
2017	Start a War	Confessions	–
2017	Russian Roulette	Confessions	Alex Gilbert
2018	Falling	Confessions	Sascha Geadert and Wolfram Kampffmeyer

== Demos ==
Title	Release date	Label
Fall from Heaven	May 23, 2003	Independent
Black Lotus	October 3, 2003	Independent
Extinction	June 11, 2004	Independent
Sonic Syndicate	Summer 2006	Independent

== Unreleased albums ==
Title	Release date	Label	Recorded
Live at Summer Breeze	N/A	Nuclear Blast	At Summer Breeze 2008

== Unreleased songs ==
Title	Recording session
Freeman	Love and Other Disasters
Heart of Eve	We Rule the Night
Phoenix Down (Later re-recorded by The Unguided)	Burn This City
Assassination of a Martyr (Later renamed "Icehart Fragment" and re-recorded by The Unguided)	Burn This City
Burnout	Burn This City
Waiting for You to Wake	Burn This City
