= Stigmata (disambiguation) =

Stigmata, bodily marks, sores, or sensations of pain in locations corresponding to the crucifixion wounds of Jesus

Stigmata may also refer to:

== Music ==
- Stigmata (Russian band), a Russian metalcore band
- Stigmata (Sri Lankan band), a Sri Lankan heavy metal band
- Stigmata (record label), a German record label
- Stigmata, the former name of the Swedish band The Blinded
- Stigmata (Arch Enemy album), a 1998 album by Swedish melodic death metal band Arch Enemy
- Stigmata, a 2009 album by the American musician Martin Rev
- "Stigmata" (song), a single by industrial metal band Ministry from the 1988 album The Land of Rape and Honey
- "Stigmata", a song by the Finnish goth rock band The 69 Eyes
- "Stigmata", a song by the Japanese band Rentrer en Soi
- "Stigmata", a song by the American band Varials
- "Stigmata", a song by the American rapper Ab-Soul from the 2014 album These Days...
- "Stigmata", a song by the English band Loathe from the 2017 album The Cold Sun
- "Stigmata", a 2022 single by American metalcore band Convictions

== Other uses ==
- Stigmata (medicine, chiefly in the plural stigmata), visible signs or characteristics of a medical condition.
- Stigmata (short story) a 1963 short story by Joyce Carol Oates
- Stigmata (film), a 1999 movie produced by Frank Mancuso Jr.
- The Three Stigmata of Palmer Eldritch, a 1965 novel by Philip K. Dick
- Stigmata of the liver, a symptom of chronic liver disease
- Spiracle (arthropods), entrances to the respiratory system of some insects
- Stigmata, structures in the pharynx of a tunicate (animal)

== See also ==
- Stigma (disambiguation)
- Stigmatines
