= Stigma =

Stigma or (pl.: stigmata or stigmas) may refer to:

- Social stigma, the disapproval of a person based on physical or behavioral characteristics that distinguish them from others

== Symbolism ==
- Stigmata, bodily marks or wounds resembling the crucifixion wounds of Christ
- A badge of shame, or stigma, an insignia, badge, brand, or designator of infamy or disgrace

== Biology ==
- Stigma (anatomy), a small spot, mark, scar, or minute hole
- Stigma (botany), part of the female reproductive part of a flower
- Pterostigma, a cell in the outer wing of insects
- Eyespot apparatus, or stigma, a light-detecting organelle in cells

== Writing ==
- Stigma (ligature), a ligature of the Greek letters sigma and tau (Ϛ), also used as Ϛʹ as the Greek numeral 6

== Arts, entertainment and media ==
=== Books ===
- Stigma: Notes on the Management of Spoiled Identity, a 1963 book written by Erving Goffman
- Stigma (manga), a manga series by Kazuya Minekura

=== Film and television ===
- Stigma (1972 film), a film featuring Philip Michael Thomas
- Stigma (1977 film), originally broadcast as part of the BBC's Ghost Story for Christmas series
- Stigma (2013 film), a Nigerian drama film
- "Stigma" (Star Trek: Enterprise), a 2003 second-season episode of Star Trek: Enterprise

=== Music ===
- Stigma (Italian band), a former Italian metal band
- Stigma (EMF album), 1992
- Stigma (Mind Assault album), 2008
- Stigma (Wage War album), 2024
- Stigma, a 2005 album by Yōsei Teikoku
- Stigma, a 2015 album by Neurotech
- "Stigma", a 2010 song from the album Split the Atom by Noisia
- "Stigma", a 2016 song from the album Wings by Korean band BTS

== Sports ==
- Stigma (wrestler), American professional wrestler
- Stigma (luchador), Mexican professional wrestler

== See also ==
- Stigmata (disambiguation)
