= The Unguided =

Swedish metal band

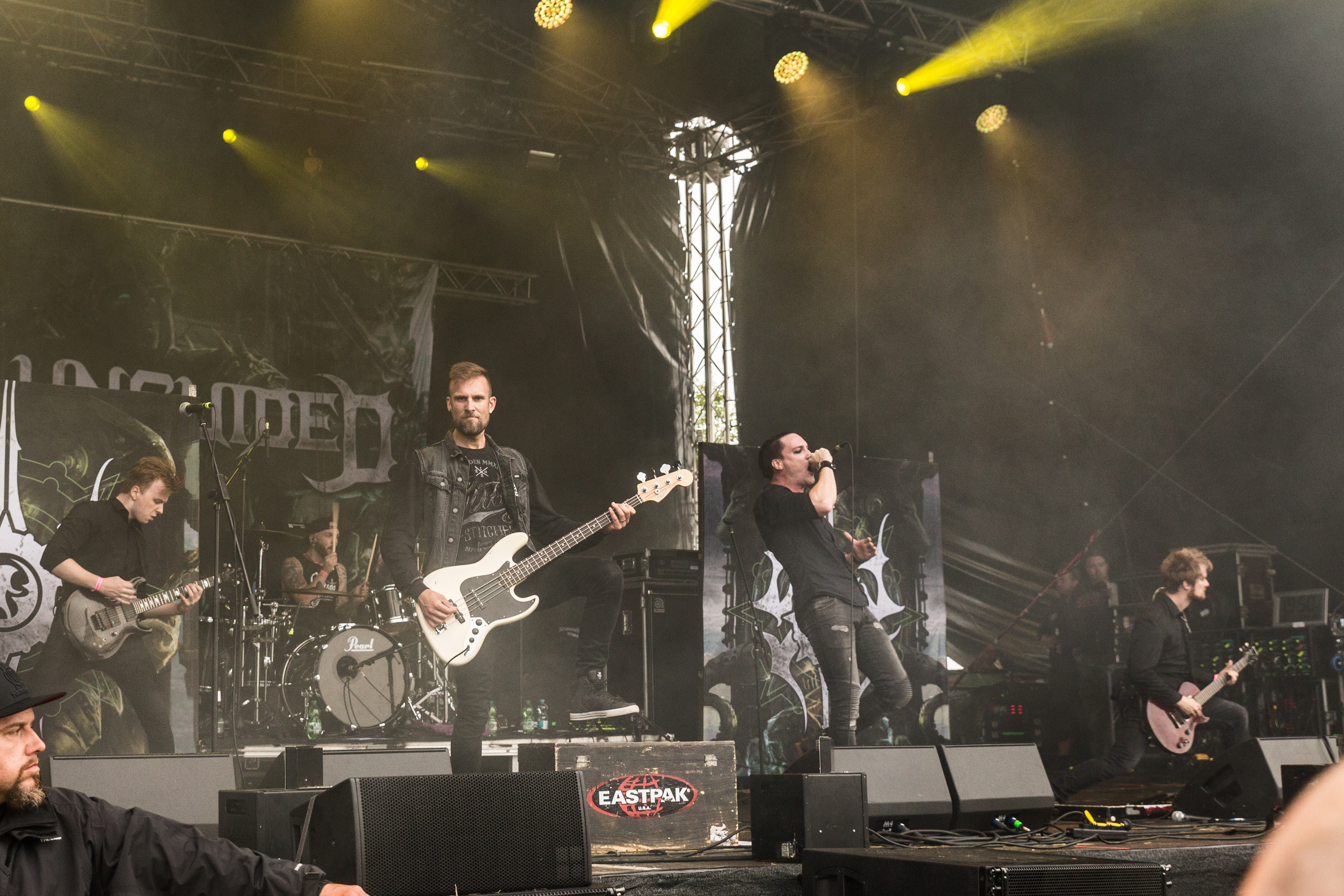
- The Unguided at Metal Frenzy 2017 in Germany

Background information
- Origin: Falkenberg, Sweden
- Genres: Melodic death metal, melodic metalcore, power metal, alternative metal
- Years active: 2010–present
- Labels: Despotz, Napalm
- Members: Richard Sjunnesson; Roger Sjunnesson; Richard Schill; Jonathan Thorpenberg; Fredrik Holmlund
- Past members: John Bengtsson; Roland Johansson; Henric Liljesand
- Website: the-unguided.com

The Unguided is a Swedish melodic death metal band, formed by Richard Sjunnesson, Roger Sjunnesson, Roland Johansson and John Bengtsson, all of whom are former members of Sonic Syndicate. Later, they were joined by Cipher System bassist Henric Liljesand. Bengtsson was replaced by Richard Schill in late 2012 and Johansson was replaced by Jonathan Thorpenberg in 2016.

== History ==
=== Formation (2009–2010) ===
Before The Unguided was formed, all of the core members played in the Swedish metal band Sonic Syndicate. Vocalist Roland Johansson left in 2009 due to issues with extensive touring. In October 2010, it was announced that vocalist Richard Sjunneson would not take part of the rest of the We Rule the Night tour to spend more time with his family, but a couple of days after he announced the break was permanent, that he left Sonic Syndicate due to creative differences. Richard went on to form the new band, The Unguided, together with Roland Johansson and Roger Sjunnesson.

=== Nightmareland (2010–2011) ===
On 22 December 2010, Richard revealed on his blog that the band would be releasing two brand-new songs in January. On 9 January 2011 the band revealed the artwork and title for their upcoming EP, Nightmareland. The artwork was done by Kuang Hong. The layout and booklet design was made by Gustavo Sazes, the same person who made the artwork for the Sonic Syndicate EP Burn This City. An alternative version of the artwork for later re-issues of the EP was made by Jose A. Aranguren, the same person who made the artwork for the Sonic Syndicate album Eden Fire. On the same day, it was also announced that the release date of Nightmareland would be delayed until February due to the band re-recording it in a professional studio and not in Richard's home studio. On 18 January 2011, the band announced the title of the two new songs for the Nightmareland EP: "Green Eyed Demon" and "Pathfinder". On the same day, it was revealed that the recording took place in The Abyss studio (same studio Sonic Syndicate recorded Only Inhuman, Love and Other Disasters and Burn This City) in Pärlby, Sweden with producer Jonas Kjellgren (same producer Sonic Syndicate used for Only Inhuman, Love and Other Disasters and Burn This City).

On 6 February 2011, the band announced that their first concert would be as a part of the set-list for the 2011 Getaway Rock Festival. Richard also revealed that he had joined the Swedish metal band Faithful Darkness.

On 16 February 2011, the band released a video on their YouTube page including a preview of two tracks of the upcoming EP. On 18 February 2011, the band announced that the recording, mixing and mastering of Nightmareland was done. They also announced that the band had signed with the Swedish record label Despotz Records, on which Nightmareland would be released. 7 March 2011 the band announced that Nightmareland would be released on 1 April 2011 through Despotz Records. They also announced that the band would be re-recording songs they wrote when they still were in Fallen Angels. On the release day of Nightmareland, "Pathfinder" premiered on the Swedish radio station Bandit Rock.

=== Hell Frost (2011–2012) ===
On 28 April 2011, the band announced that pre-production of their debut album had officially begun. They also revealed that Jonas Kjellgren also would be producing the album and that The Unguided had signed a deal with Despotz Records to release and distribute it. On 6 June 2011 it was revealed that the second The Unguided concert would be on 26 July 2011 at the annual Grand Rock event at their hometown Falkenberg, Sweden.

On 16 June 2011, without any official announcement, The Unguided released their debut single "Betrayer of the Code". "Betrayer of the Code" was originally written by Roger and Richard when they still played in Fallen Angels. The artwork for the single was made by Jose A. Aranguren, the same person who made the artwork for the Sonic Syndicate album Eden Fire and the alternative version of Nightmareland. With the release of the first single, The Unguided had officially begun recording their debut album. Although the recording session had already been going on for a while, it wasn't announced until 16 June.

On 25 June 2011, Richard announced that The Unguided would not be able to perform any songs from Sonic Syndicate due to contractual reasons. After Johansson departed the band in 2009 he signed a contract which prohibits him from playing Sonic Syndicate material (signing this contract was mistakenly assumed mandatory). A counter-contract signed by the other band members was required to lift the restriction but Robin Sjunnesson (cousin of Richard & Roger) refused to sign it, removing the possibility for The Unguided to play Sonic Syndicate material.

Richard Sjunnesson included the following statement about the situation on his blog:

I know this comes as a disappointment to a lot of you who were looking forward to hearing Sonic Syndicate songs with the original singer setup but it's totally out of our hands. Until we get that last signature there's really nothing we can do. We in The Unguided don't see this hindrance as a major obstacle, however. We see it as a great challenge since we immediately have to banish ourselves to the writing board, finish up, and rehearse a lot of new material. Keep in mind, we're NOT Sonic Syndicate. We're The Unguided with all the properties that comes of that. Thus The Unguided's upcoming live appearances will consist of entirely our own material.

On 3 October, the artwork and title of their debut album Hell Frost was revealed at 616. The artwork was done by Kuang Hong, the same person who made the artwork for Nightmareland. The layout and booklet design was made by Gustavo Sazes. On the same day Despotz Records announced that the recording, mixing and mastering of Hell Frost. was completed and that it would be released on 30 November 2011.

Richard had already announced on his blog that the album would include a cover song; on 8 October, it was revealed to be "Tankens Mirakel" by the Swedish EBM duo Spark. The song has been translated into English and will appear on the album with the title "The Miracle of Mind". It will be the JakeBox exclusive bonus track for Hell Frost. On 11 October the Swedish radio station Bandit Rock premiered the song "Inherit the Earth", a preview of the song had been played the day before as well.

On 25 October, it was announced that "Inherit the Earth" would be the lead single. "Phoenix Down" was originally intended as the lead single. The single was eventually released on 26 October 2011. The artwork for the single was made by Jose A. Aranguren. On 13 January 2012 the band released their second single "Phoenix Down" and its music video, directed by Patric Ullaeus who has worked with all the members of the band on several occasions. The single was released as a 4-track single. The artwork for the single was made by Jose A. Aranguren.

=== InvaZion and Fragile Immortality (2012–2015) ===
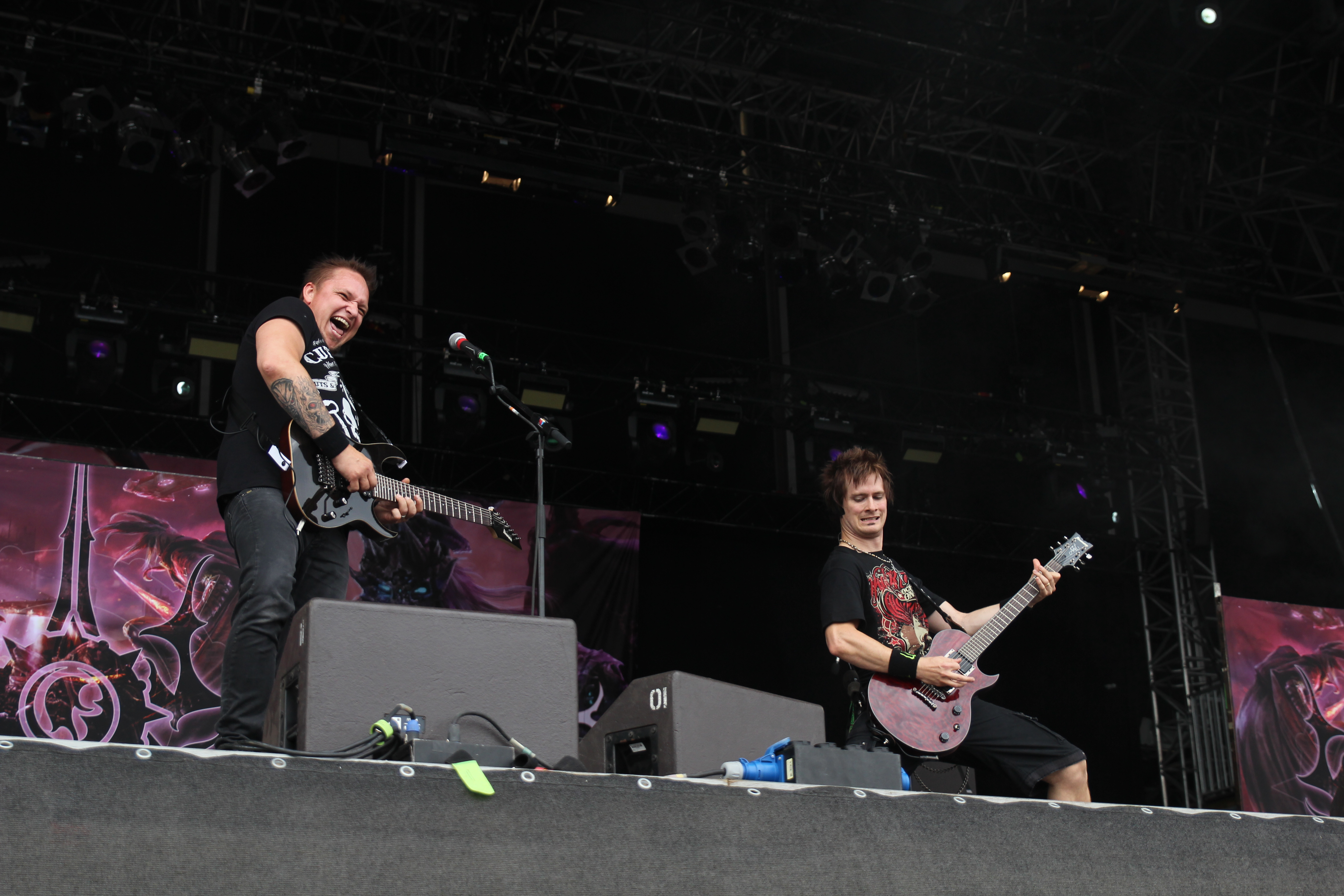
The Unguided at With Full Force 2014

On 21 December 2012, The Unguided independently released the two-track EP InvaZion, featuring the tracks "Singularity" and "Eye of the Thylacine.". The release dates for Fragile Immortality were announced on 21 November 2013: 31 January 2014 in Germany, Austria, Switzerland, Finland, and Benelux; 5 February in Spain, Sweden, and Norway; 3 February for the "rest of Europe"; and 11 February for the U.S. and Canada. The new album was announced to be recorded with Napalm Records.

Fragile Immortality takes on old Sonic Syndicate lyrical themes, such as the tracks "Unguided Entity" and "Only Human."

=== Lust and Loathing; Roland Johansson's departure and new member (2015–present) ===
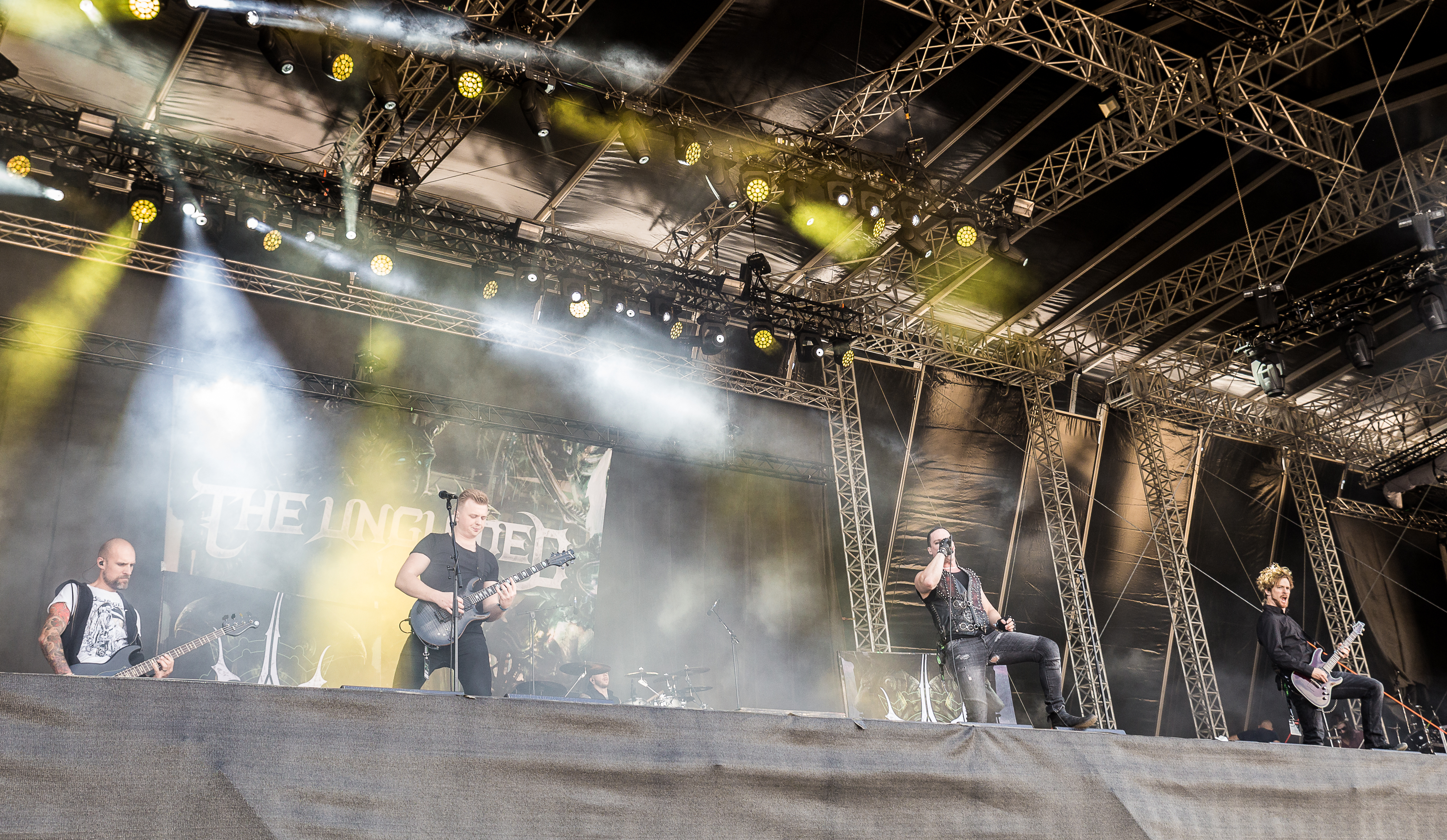
The Unguided at Rockharz Open Air 2019 in Germany

Between 30 October 2015 and 27 November 2015, The Unguided posted a three-part series of studio vlogs detailing the band's work on an upcoming album. On 3 December 2015, The Unguided officially announced the details of their upcoming album, which is to be titled "Lust and Loathing." The release date is scheduled for 26 February 2016 via Napalm Records, and pre-orders will be shipped out on week 8 of year 2016. Multiple pre-order bundles for Europe include combinations of the album, T-shirt, sleeved shirt, poster, guitar pick, and 2016 calendar. Two available pre-orders for U.S. are either the Digipack Limited Edition CD or the T-shirt – no bundles are available. After announcing the album, Richard Sjunnesson, the band's harsh vocalist, commented: "Sitting on the new songs, for what felt like a lifetime, and finally get to shed some light on what's to come from camp; The Unguided, is a sensation on its own. This is the last part of an album trilogy, that's been in the making for 6 years, and what a climax it is indeed. Expect the unexpected! We poured everything and more into this one." An article on BraveWords website reports that tour dates to support the new album will be announced soon.

Following recent shows without co-frontman and guitarist Roland Johansson, the band posted a new music video on YouTube titled Nighttaker which briefly showed Johansson but also a new vocalist, Jonathan Thorpenberg. The following day on 10 December 2016, the band released an official statement on Social media, announcing the departure of Roland Johansson who had been a member since the band's formation six years ago. He left because of increasingly growing commitments to touring and recording, which were having a negative impact on his personal life.

== Band members ==
Current members

- Richard Sjunnesson – unclean vocals (2010–present)
- Roger Sjunnesson – rhythm guitar, keyboards (2010–present)
- Richard Schill – drums (2012–present)
- Jonathan Thorpenberg – lead guitar, clean vocals (2016–present)
- Fredrik Holmlund – bass (2023–present)

Former members

- Roland Johansson – lead guitar, clean vocals (2010–2016)
- Henric Liljesand – bass (2011–2020)
- John Bengtsson – drums (2011–2012)

Session musicians

- Pontus Hjelm – keyboard production (2011-present)
- Christoffer Andersson – live guest vocals (2011)
- Jonas Kjellgren – bass on "Hell Frost" (2011)
- Per Qvarnström – live drums (2011)
- Peter Tägtgren – guest vocals on "Hell Frost" (2011)
- Hansi Kürsch – guest vocals on "Fragile Immortality" (2014)
- Jonas Vilander – live bass through the "Lust and Loathing Tour" (2016)

== Discography ==
=== Studio albums ===
| Title | Release date | Label |
|---|---|---|
| Hell Frost | 30 November 2011 | Despotz Records |
| Fragile Immortality | 5 February 2014 | Napalm Records |
| Lust and Loathing | 26 February 2016 | Napalm Records |
| And the Battle Royale | 10 November 2017 | Napalm Records |
| Father Shadow | 9 October 2020 | Napalm Records |
| Hellven | 7 March 2025 | SixOneSix AB |

=== Compilations ===
| Title | Release date | Label |
|---|---|---|
| Hell Frost: The Ultimate Collection | 20 September 2012 | Despotz Records |

=== Extended plays ===
| Title | Release date | Label |
|---|---|---|
| Phoenix Down | 29 March 2012 | Despotz Records |
| 616 | 21 October 2022 | Napalm Records |

=== Singles ===
| Title | Release date | Label |
|---|---|---|
| "Nightmareland" | 1 April 2011 | Despotz Records |
| "Betrayer of the Code" | 16 June 2011 | Despotz Records |
| "Inherit the Earth" | 26 October 2011 | Despotz Records |
| "The Miracle of Mind" | 20 November 2011 | Despotz Records |
| "Phoenix Down" | 13 January 2012 | Despotz Records |
| "Deathwalker" | 19 September 2012 | Despotz Records |
| "invaZion" | 21 December 2012 | Independent |
| "Inception" | 13 December 2013 | Napalm Records |
| "Fallen Angels" | 22 December 2014 | Napalm Records |
| "The Worst Day (Revisited)" | 19 December 2015 | Napalm Records |
| "Enraged" | 29 January 2016 | Napalm Records |
| "Brotherhood" | 23 December 2016 | Napalm Records |
| "Legendary" | 15 September 2017 | Napalm Records |
| "The Heartbleed Bug" | 13 October 2017 | Napalm Records |
| "Royalgatory" | 21 June 2019 | Napalm Records |
| "Crown Prince Syndrome" | 12 August 2020 | Napalm Records |
| "Never Yield" | 10 September 2020 | Napalm Records |
| "Stand Alone Complex" | 08 October 2020 | Napalm Records |
| "Hell" | 18 October 2024 | SixOneSix AB |
| "Red Alert" | 15 November 2024 | SixOneSix AB |

=== Music videos ===
| Title | Year | Album | Director |
|---|---|---|---|
| "Phoenix Down" | 2011 | Hell Frost | Patric Ullaeus |
| "Betrayer of the Code" | 2012 | Hell Frost | 11 FRAMES PRODUCTIONS |
| "Inception" | 2013 | Fragile Immortality | 11 FRAMES PRODUCTIONS |
| "Eye of the Thylacine" | 2014 | Fragile Immortality | 11 FRAMES PRODUCTIONS |
| "Enraged" | 2016 | Lust and Loathing | Patric Ullaeus |
| "Operation: E.A.E" | 2016 | Lust and Loathing | 11 FRAMES PRODUCTIONS |
| "Heartseeker" | 2016 | Lust and Loathing | 11 FRAMES PRODUCTIONS |
| "Nighttaker" | 2016 | Brotherhood | 11 FRAMES PRODUCTIONS |
| "The Heartbleed Bug" | 2017 | And the Battle Royale | Carl Thorén Productions |
| "A Link to the Past" | 2018 | And the Battle Royale | Maluha Media |
| "Seth" | 2019 | Royalgatory | Maluha Media |
| "Crown Prince Syndrome" | 2020 | Father Shadow | Patric Ullaeus |
| "Where Love Comes to Die" | 2021 | Father Shadow | Patric Ullaeus |
| "Iceheart Fragment & Unguided Entity (Re-Imagined)" | 2022 | 616 | – |
| "Hell" | 2024 | Hellven | Linda Florin |
| "Red Alert" | 2024 | Hellven | – |
