= Infamy and the Breed =

Studio album by Zonaria
- Released: 3 September 2007
- Recorded: November 2006 – March 2007 at Black Lounge studios, Avesta, Sweden
- Genre: Melodic death metal
- Length: 46:31
- Label: Pivotal Rockordings
- Producer: Per Nilsson

Zonaria chronology
Rendered in Vain (2006)	Infamy and the Breed (2007)	The Cancer Empire (2008)

Infamy and the Breed is the debut album by Swedish melodic death metal band, Zonaria. This album was recorded at Black Lounge studios, Avesta, Sweden with Per Nilson and Jonas Kjellgren of Scar Symmetry.

== Track listing ==
1. "Infamy" - 1:39
2. "The Last Endeavor" - 3:27
3. "Pandemic Assault" - 3:48
4. "The Armageddon Anthem" - 3:43
5. "Rendered in Vain" - 4:16
6. "Image of Myself" - 4:20
7. "Evolution Overdose" - 4:03
8. "Attending Annihilation" feat. Christian Älvestam of Scar Symmetry - 3:34
9. "Descend into Chaos" - 3:43
10. "Ravage the Breed" - 4:25
11. "The Black Omen" - 4:54
12. "Everything Is Wasteland" - 4:46
13. "Misery Dive (Japanese Bonus Track)"

== Credits ==
- Jonas Kjellgren - Mixing/Mastering
- Per Nilson - Producer
- Christian Älvestam - guest vocals
- Simon Berglund – vocals, lead guitar
- Emil Nyström – guitar
- Jerry Ekman – bass
- Emanuel Isaksson – drums
- Artwork by Seth (Rotting Christ, Vader, Decapitated)

== Release history ==
Country	Date
United Kingdom	3 September 2007
United States	4 September 2007
Europe	7 September 2007
Japan	7 September 2007
