= Confessions (Sonic Syndicate album) =

Studio album by Sonic Syndicate
- Released: October 14, 2016
- Recorded: June 2016
- Studio: Purple Skull Music
- Genre: Pop rock, electronica, progressive house
- Length: 43:43
- Label: Despotz Records
- Producer: Kristoffer Folin

Sonic Syndicate chronology
Sonic Syndicate (2014)	Confessions (2016)

Singles from Confessions
- 1. "Confessions" Released: October 12, 2016

Professional ratings
Review scores
Source	Rating
Distorted Sound	6/10
Louder Sound	1/5 stars

Confessions is the sixth studio album by Swedish rock band Sonic Syndicate, released on October 14, 2016, and their last album before their hiatus since 2018. The album was released via Despotz Records. It is the first album by the band to not feature longtime bassist Karin Axelsson, nor longtime drummer John "Runken" Bengtsson since their 2005 debut Eden Fire. They were replaced by Michel Bärzén and Peter Wallenäs, respectively. On October 12, 2016, the band released the album's title track as its first single. The music video to the song was released on October 21, 2016, one week after the album's release.

== Track listing ==
All tracks are written by Sonic Syndicate.

No.	Title	Length
1.	"Confessions"	3:46
2.	"It's a Shame"	3:55
3.	"Start a War"	3:48
4.	"Falling"	3:34
5.	"I Like It Rough"	3:20
6.	"Still Believe" (featuring Madyx)	3:37
7.	"Crystalize"	4:02
8.	"Burn to Live"	3:24
9.	"Life is Not a Map"	3:44
10.	"Russian Roulette"	3:10
11.	"Closure"	3:43
12.	"Halfway Down the Road"	3:40
Total length:		43:43

== Personnel ==
Band members

- Nathan J. Biggs - lead vocals
- Robin Sjunnesson - guitar
- Michel Bärzén - bass
- Peter Wallenäs - drums, percussion

Additional musicians

- Michelle "Madyx" Blanchard - guest vocals (6)
