= Fredrik Holmlund =

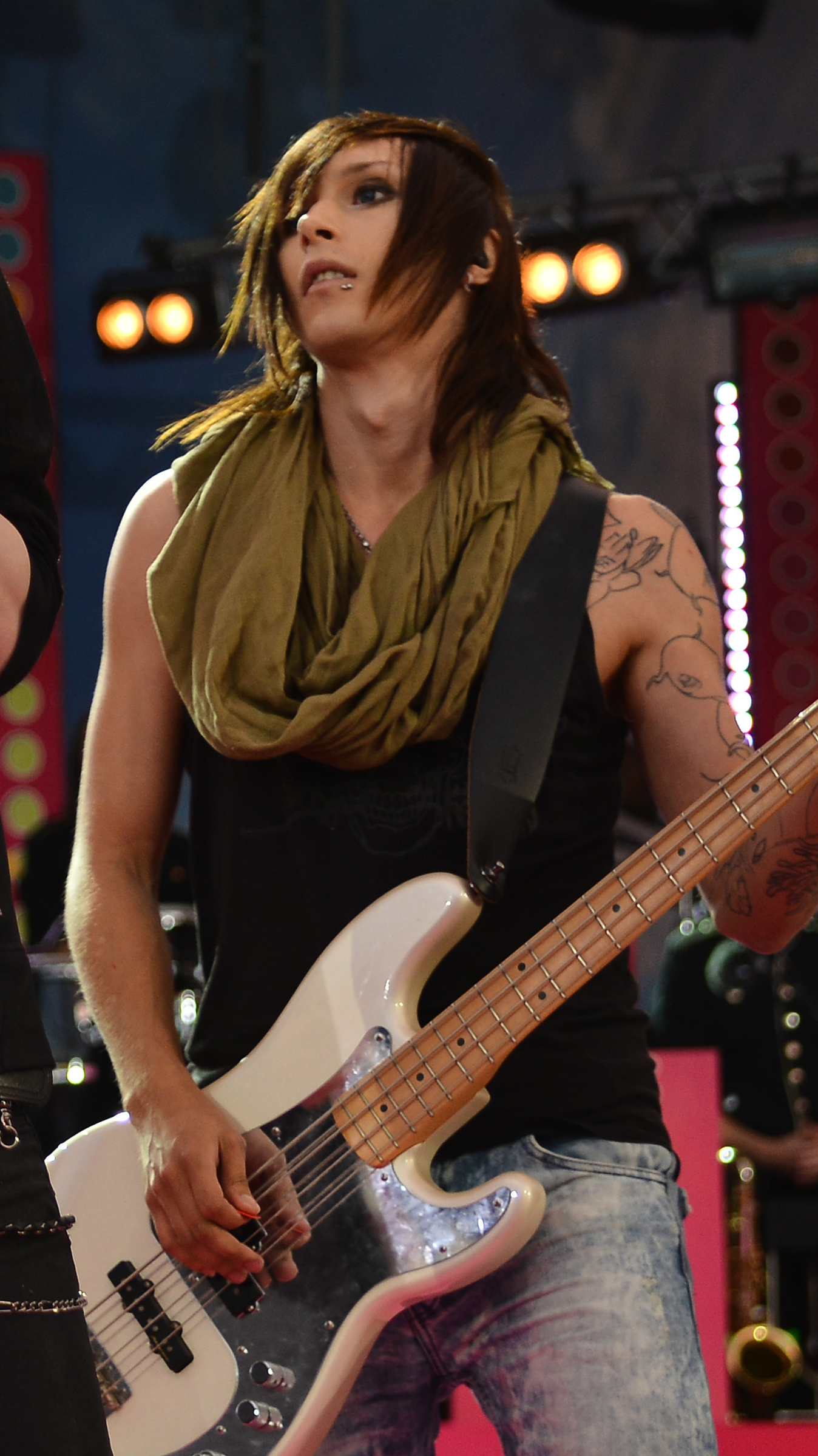
- Holmlund performing with Yohio in 2013.

Background information
- Also known as: Lazsarus
- Born: Fredrik Sebastian Holmlund; 7 August 1989 (age 37); Södertälje, Sweden
- Genres: Heavy metal, rock, pop
- Instruments: Vocals, guitar, bass, piano, drums
- Years active: 2010–
- Labels: Keios Entertainment (Sverige); Universal Music Sverige (Sverige)
- Website: www.lazsarus.com

Fredrik Holmlund (born 7 August 1989) is a Swedish musician, artist and singer-songwriter. He is best known for his work as the bass player for the Swedish singer Yohio

== Biography and career ==
Holmlund was born in Södertälje, Sweden. He grew up in Södertälje and started singing and playing guitar in several Stockholm-based Rock- and punk bands.

In 2011 Holmlund started the hybrid-metal band DESAIHA and decided to switch the guitar for the bass since they didn't find anyone who was "good enough".

One year later he quit his job to focus on Desaiha. Shortly after they released their first demo "Wisteria" the band announced that they signed a management-deal with Yohio.

Holmlund was the bassist of Yohio in Melodifestivalen 2013.Heartbreak Hotel went straight to the final in the first round in Telenor Arena in Karlskrona februari 2, 2013. In the final, the song finished in second place with 133 points. The year continued with a tour with Yohio which ended in Stockholm where Gackt was a guest artist.

In 2014 he performed with Yohio again in Melodifestivalen with the song "To the End" which, yet again went straight to the final. The finale of Melodifestivalen 2014 was held in Friends Arena, where they finished in 6th place with 82 points.

In August 2014, Desaiha released their first, and only single "Castiel", which debuted at number one on the Swedish iTunes list. The single is the record label, KEIOS Entertainment's, first released song.

Desaiha split in early 2015 and Holmlund joined the band Marsh where he plays guitar and sings.

In March 2016, Yohio announced that he would move to Japan. On 18 June of that year Holmlund made his last gig with Yohio in Sweden.

Holmlund announced in April the same year via his website that during the summer he would record songs for his solo project Lazsarus.

On 4 September 2016, the Swedish rock band Kerbera announced via its Facebook page that Holmlund was the band's new bass player and that his first gig with the band would be at AniMaCo in Berlin

Holmlund announced via social media in November the same year that he was sponsored by Schecter Guitars

On 16 June 2017, Holmlund released his first song with Kerbera which also came in first on the iTunes list and was the 12th most downloaded song in Sweden. In conjunction with the release, fans were given the opportunity to unlock the associated music video by listening to the song. A feature that Holmlund coded.

In the fall of 2017 Holmlund together with Kerbera released the single "Love Like a Loaded Gun" with accompanying video. The song came from Kerbera's debut album People Like You .

In early January 2018 a new single named "Circus" was announced which became Holmlund's fourth release with Kerbera. At the same time, Kerbera announced that they would be supporting Falling in Reverse in Russia and that the band will release the first tour dates for 2018.

On 20 March 2018, Kerbera released the single "Howl" for charity and Holmlund announced via social media that it was the first song he wrote for Kerbera. All proceeds went in full to the organization "The Man that Rescues Dogs" and the band went on a three-week tour in Thailand. Howl also took home first place on the iTunes list. In August of that year, Holmlund announced that he would leave Kerbera. In September he joined the band on stage for a farewell concert where he sang the songs. Holmlund released his first single "Rise" under the pseudonym "Lazsarus" on 18 September 2018.

In early June 2019, Södertälje Stadsscen announced that a tribute concert for the game franchise Silent Hill would be held during the autumn. Holmlund plays guitar and since the franchise celebrates 20 years the composer Akira Yamaoka will be joining the band on stage. In October 2021 the concert was released for free on Youtube.

In 2023, Holmlund received a call from Richard Sjunnesson, inviting him to audition as the live-session bassist for The Unguided on their tour with Hypocrisy. As the tour progressed, Holmlund's connection with the band deepened, describing the experience as a moment of camaraderie and shared passion. Following the tour, Holmlund was invited to join The Unguided as a full-time member to contribute to their upcoming sixth album.

On 18 October 2024, The Unguided released their first single with Holmlund, titled "Hell," and announced the release of their new album Hellven on the same day.

== Band and projects ==
- 2010 Vanity
- 2011–2015 Desaiha
- 2013– Yohio
- 2015 Marsh
- 2016–2018 Kerbera
- 2016– Lazsarus
- 2019 Silent Hill: The Music
- 2024 The Unguided

== Discography ==
Year	Artist	Album
2010	Vanity	The Vision (EP)
2012	Desaiha	Wisteria (single)
2013	Yohio	Break the Border
2013	Yohio	Break the Border tour final (Live-DVD)
2014	Desaiha	Castiel (single)
2017	Kerbera	Heathens (single)
2017	Kerbera	Love Like a Loaded Gun (single)
2017	Kerbera	People Like You (album)
2018	Kerbera	Circus (single) Howl(single)
2018	Lazsarus	Rise (single)
2024	The Unguided	Hell (single)

== Filmography ==
Year	Title
2013	Melodifestivalen 2013 – Deltävling 1: Karlskrona
2013	Yohio – Documentary
2013	Melodifestivalen 2013 – Final: Stockholm
2013	Allsång på Skansen
2013	Moraeus med mera
2013	Sommarkrysset
2013	Idol
2013	Break the Border tour final
2014	Melodifestivalen 2014 – Deltävling 2: Malmö
2014	Melodifestivalen 2014 – Final: Stockholm
2014	Lotta på Liseberg
2014	Sommarkrysset
2014	Sommarkrysset
2014	Desaiha – Castiel
2014	Svenska Hjältar
2015	Nyhetsmorgon
2016	Kerbera: Live at AniMaCo
2017	Kerbera – Heathens
2017	Kerbera – Love Like a Loaded Gun
2021	Silent Hill: The Music
2024	The Unguided – Hell
