= Rendered in Vain =

EP by Zonaria
- Released: June 1, 2006
- Recorded: Black Lounge studios, Avesta, Sweden
- Genre: Melodic death metal
- Length: 11:45
- Label: Swedmetal Records
- Producer: Jonas Kjellgren

Zonaria chronology
Evolution Overdose (2005)	Rendered in Vain (2006)	Infamy and the Breed (2007)

Rendered in Vain is the second demo recording by Swedish melodic death metal band, Zonaria. This album was recorded at Black Lounge studios, Avesta, Sweden with Jonas Kjellgren of Scar Symmetry and would feature a guest appearance by Christian Älvestam. The song, "Rendered in Vain" would also be used in the video game The Darkness. All three tracks would go on to be re-recorded for their full-length debut.

== Track listing ==
1. "Rendered In Vain" - 4:17
2. "Attending Annihilation" ft. Christian Älvestam of Miseration - 3:32
3. "Ravage The Breed" - 3:56

== Credits ==
All music by S.Berglund.
Lyrics on track 1 and 3 by S.Berglund and on track 2 by K.Holmberg, E.Isaksson and S.Berglund.
Arrangements by Zonaria, keyboard arrangements by S.Berglund.
Cover artwork by Seth. Other artworks by E2Media.
Clean vocals on track 2 by Christian Älvestan.
death growl on track 1 by E.Isaksson and E.Nyström
