= Pivotal Rockordings =

- Founded: 2004
- Founder: Leevan Macomeau, Alexi Front
- Genre: Melodic death metal Death metal Deathcore
- Country of origin: U.S.
- Official website: www.pivotalalliance.com

Pivotal Rockordings is a record label that was founded in 2004 by Leevan Macomeau and Alexi Front.

Following its inception, Pivotal Rockordings signed its first artist, Sonic Syndicate, a melodic death metal band from Falkenberg, Sweden and released Eden Fire, Sonic Syndicate's (and Pivotal Rockordings') first full length on September 13, 2005. Sonic Syndicate's album would eventually land them a record deal with Nuclear Blast Records and give the label notoriety. Eden Fire would go on to sell over 10,000 copies by the end of 2010 with the help of Sonic Syndicate's continued commercial success and a re-release through Koch Distribution in the U.S. in collaboration with France's Listenable Records.

By spring 2006, Pivotal Rockordings capitalized on its success with Sonic Syndicate by signing their second artist, Blinded Colony, a band from the Southeastern city of Karlshamn, Sweden. The band's label debut Bedtime Prayers would go on to surpass Sonic Syndicate's Eden Fire digital sales but due to the band's loss of vocalist Johan Schuster (Stage name Shellback, writer and producer for artists such as Pink and Britney Spears), followed by years of relative inactivity, the band was not re-signed and eventually re-formed under the moniker The Blinded with a duo of new vocalists. Shortly before Blinded Colony's Bedtime Prayers release, Pivotal Rockordings was approached by a young Swedish melodic death metal band, Zonaria, who would become the third signing and move on to sign with Century Media Records for their follow-up to their Pivotal Rockordings release Infamy and the Breed. In December 2006, Leevan and Alexi announced the addition of long-time assistant Steven Seebode, as the third owner of Pivotal Rockordings. In July 2007, Italian horror inspired metal act Stigma signed a recording deal with the label and in 2008, Pivotal Rockordings released their debut When Midnight Strikes!, and in fall 2009 the fourth album from Swedish progressive metallers Skyfire entitled Esoteric. along with a digital-only EP Fractal. 2010 saw the release of Stigma's sophomore effort Concerto for the Undead along with Pivotal Rockordings' 2nd digital-only release for Stigma's The Undertaker EP, a format which Pivotal Rockordings would adopt for 2011 and its immediate future while the main-focus for co-owner Alexi Front and long-time assistant Ian Crepea shifted towards Pivotal Management, an artist management company working hand in hand with artists which it would help sign to other record labels. Among Pivotal Management's past and current roster are Annex Theory (Unsigned), The Amenta (ex-Listenable), Solution .45 (AFM). Pivotal Management has also assisted other artists either in a professional or consultative/advisory capacity such as The Unguided (Despotz), Vanisher (Unsigned), and Zonaria (Unsigned, ex-Pivotal Rockordings) among many others.

== Roster ==
=== Current bands ===
- Christian Älvestam
- Eldrimner
- Marionette
- Nonexist

=== Former bands ===
- Blinded Colony
- Skyfire
- Sonic Syndicate
- Stigma
- Zonaria
- Age of Woe
- Annex Theory
- Nociceptor

== Personnel ==
=== Owners ===
- Leevan Macomeau - Owner/Operations and Financial Manager
- Alexi Front - Owner/A&R, Operations and Public Relations
- Steven Seebode - Owner/Web/Graphic Design & Maintenance

=== Staff ===
- Ian Crepea - A&R and Promotions Manager

== See also ==
- List of record labels
