= Divine (Blinded Colony album) =

Studio album by Blinded Colony
- Released: 10 October 2003
- Recorded: SoundPalace Studios
- Genre: Melodic death metal
- Length: 36:31
- Labels: Scarlet; Soundholic
- Producer: Blinded Colony

Blinded Colony chronology
| Divine (2003) | Bedtime Prayers (2006) |

Divine was the first major release by Swedish melodic death metal band Blinded Colony. It would be the first and last album to feature singer Niklas Svensson. This would also be the only album they released under the Scarlet Records banner. It would be released thoroughly in Europe via Scarlet Records and in Japan through Soundholic Records.

Norman Sickinger of Metal.de rated the album a 6 out of 10.

== Track listing ==
1. "Contagious Sin" – 4:05
2. "Thorned and Weak" – 3:23
3. "Legacy (Slaves in the Name of Christ)" – 4:20
4. "Self-Obtained Paranoia" – 3:53
5. "Lifeless Dominion" – 4:04
6. "Discrown the Holy" – 3:50
7. "Kingdom of Pain" – 3:30
8. "Demoniser DCLXVI" – 4:54
9. "Anno Domini 1224" – 4:32

== Credits ==
- Niklas Svensson – vocals
- Tobias Olsson – guitars
- Johan Blomstrom – guitars
- Roy Erlandsson – bass
- Staffan Franzen – drums

Others:

- Ricky Andreoni – graphic design
- Carlos del Olmo – logo, cover art
- Göran Finnberg – mastering
