= Zonaria =

Swedish melodic death metal band

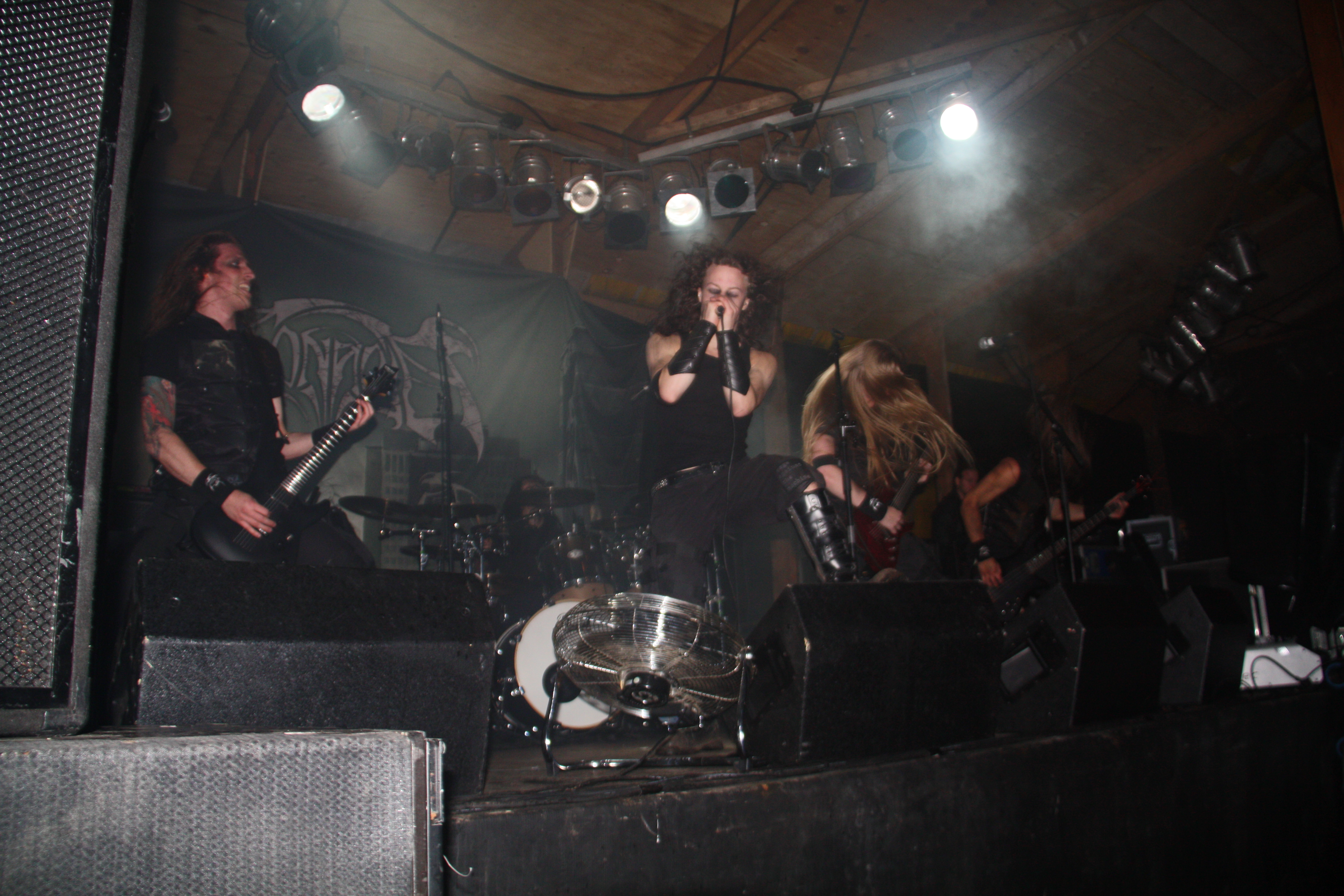
- Zonaria at Occultfest 2010

Background information
- Also known as: Seal Precious (2001)
- Origin: Umeå, Sweden
- Genres: Melodic death metal Power metal (early)
- Years active: 2002 – present
- Labels: Pivotal Rockordings; Swedmetal Records; Century Media Records; Listenable Records
- Members: Simon Berglund; Max Malmer; Rickard Lundmark; Sebastian Westermark
- Website: www.zonaria.com

Zonaria is a melodic death metal band from Umeå, Sweden, formerly known as Seal Precious. The band is currently signed to Century Media Records.

== Background ==
Formed in 2001 by Simon Berglund, Christoffer Vikström, and Mikael Hammarberg, the band originally went under the name Seal Precious. Initially the band's style was power metal, with clean vocals. Several line-up changes prevented the band from recording, but after 2003, with the addition of second guitarist, Emil Nyström, and the band's name changed to Zonaria, they spent two years playing gigs in and around Umeå before recording and releasing, in 2005, what would be Evolution Overdose.

=== New material and touring ===
In the spring of 2006, Zonaria recorded the CD single "Rendered in Vain" (and later shot a video for it). After that, Zonaria toured outside of Sweden, opening for Finnish black metal band Impaled Nazarene on a European tour. In October, Zonaria announced they had signed a record deal with Swedmetal Records to release "Rendered in Vain"; later, the song was included in the video game The Darkness.

=== Record label and debut album ===
In November 2006, Pivotal Rockordings signed Zonaria, and soon after, the band entered Black Lounge Studios with Per Nilsson and Jonas Kjellgren of Scar Symmetry to begin recording their debut album; Infamy and the Breed which was released September 2007. In late July, bassist Jerry Ekman announced his departure and was replaced by Markus Åkebo. The band shot a video for the lead single, "The Armageddon Anthem," then toured much of Europe in the beginning of 2008 opening up for Marduk.

=== Century Media and beyond ===
On 8 June 2008, Zonaria announce that they had signed a deal with Century Media Records. They toured Europe in support of the new album with Satyricon and then joined Vader and Septic Flesh throughout November and December 2008 as part of Vader's 25th anniversary tour. Their new album, The Cancer Empire, was released on 17 October 2008, was produced by Fredrik Nordström at Studio Fredman. They are currently writing for their new album. On 16 January it was announced that Zonaria would support Dark Funeral on their Declaration of Hate tour through mainland UK and Europe in March/April 2010.

In early 2011, bassist Markus Åkebo left the band, and was replaced by Max Malmer (formerly of Swedish death metal band Death Maze) on a sessional basis. Later, an announcement was made that guitarist Caleb Bingham (ex-Five Finger Death Punch) had been hired on a sessional basis to allow Simon Berglund to concentrate on singing. In May 2011 the band announced that session bassist Max Malmer will join as permanent band member. In the summer of 2012 the band released their third album Arrival Of The Red Sun. On 30 November 2012 it was reported on Zonaria's Facebook page that guitarist Emil Nyström and drummer Emanuel Isaksson had departed from the band.

In 2013, drummer Rickard Lundmark joined Zonaria. Also, it was announced that Bingham had relocated to Sweden and had joined Zonaria permanently as lead guitarist.

In the late fall of 2013 it became apparent that Caleb Bingham had become indebted by the Swedish state and could no longer stay in Sweden. This in turn led to Zonaria parting ways with him in March 2014. He has since been replaced with Sebastian Westermark.

Zonaria have not released a new studio album since 2012 and it is not known when the next album will surface, indicating that the band have been on hiatus for many years.

== Members ==
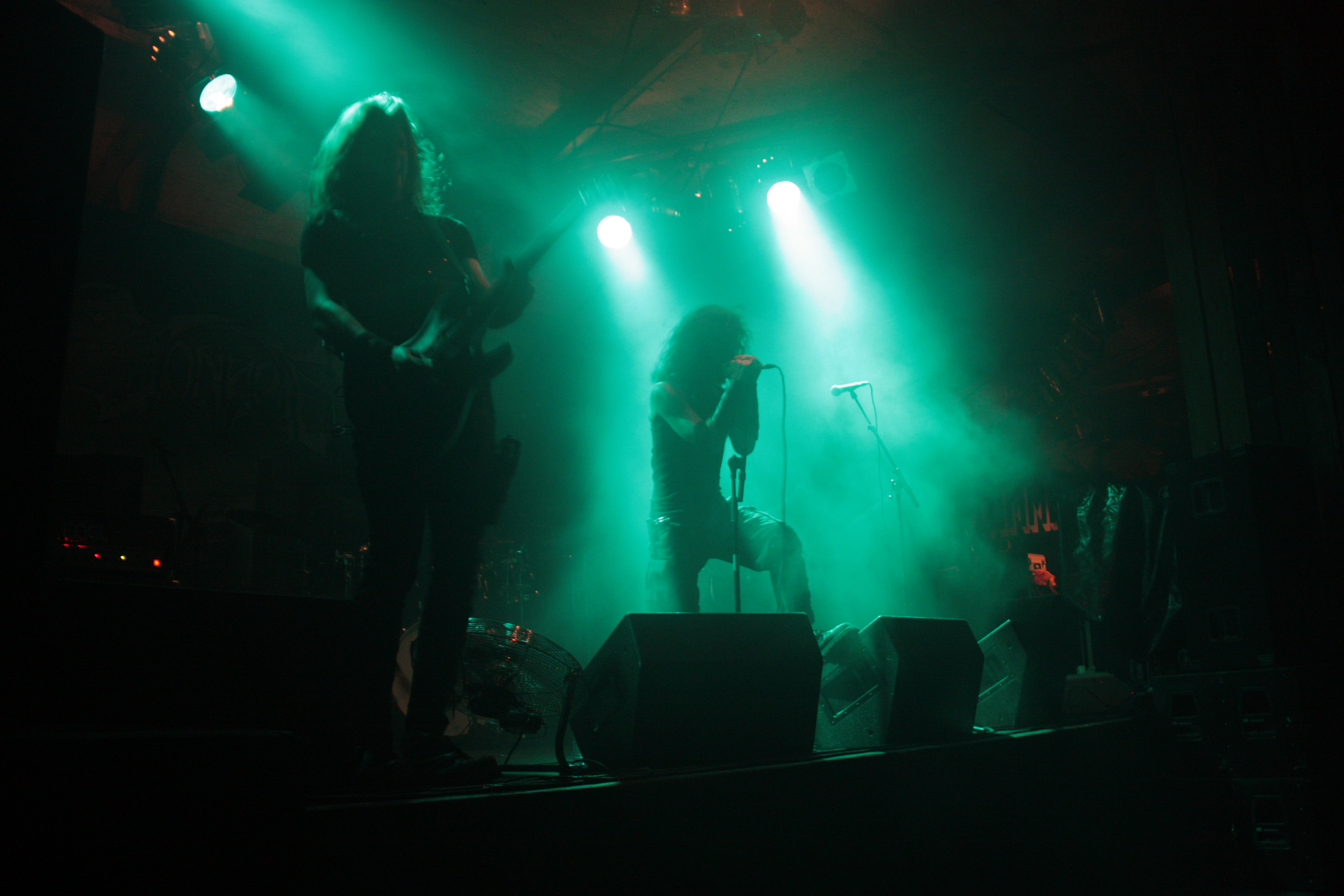
Simon Berglund at Occultfest 2010

=== Current members ===
- Simon Berglund – lead vocals (2001 – present), guitar (2001–2011, 2012–present)
- Max Malmer – bass, backing vocals (2011–present; session member 2010–2011)
- Rickard Lundmark – drums (2013–Present)
- Sebastian Westermark – guitar (2014–present)

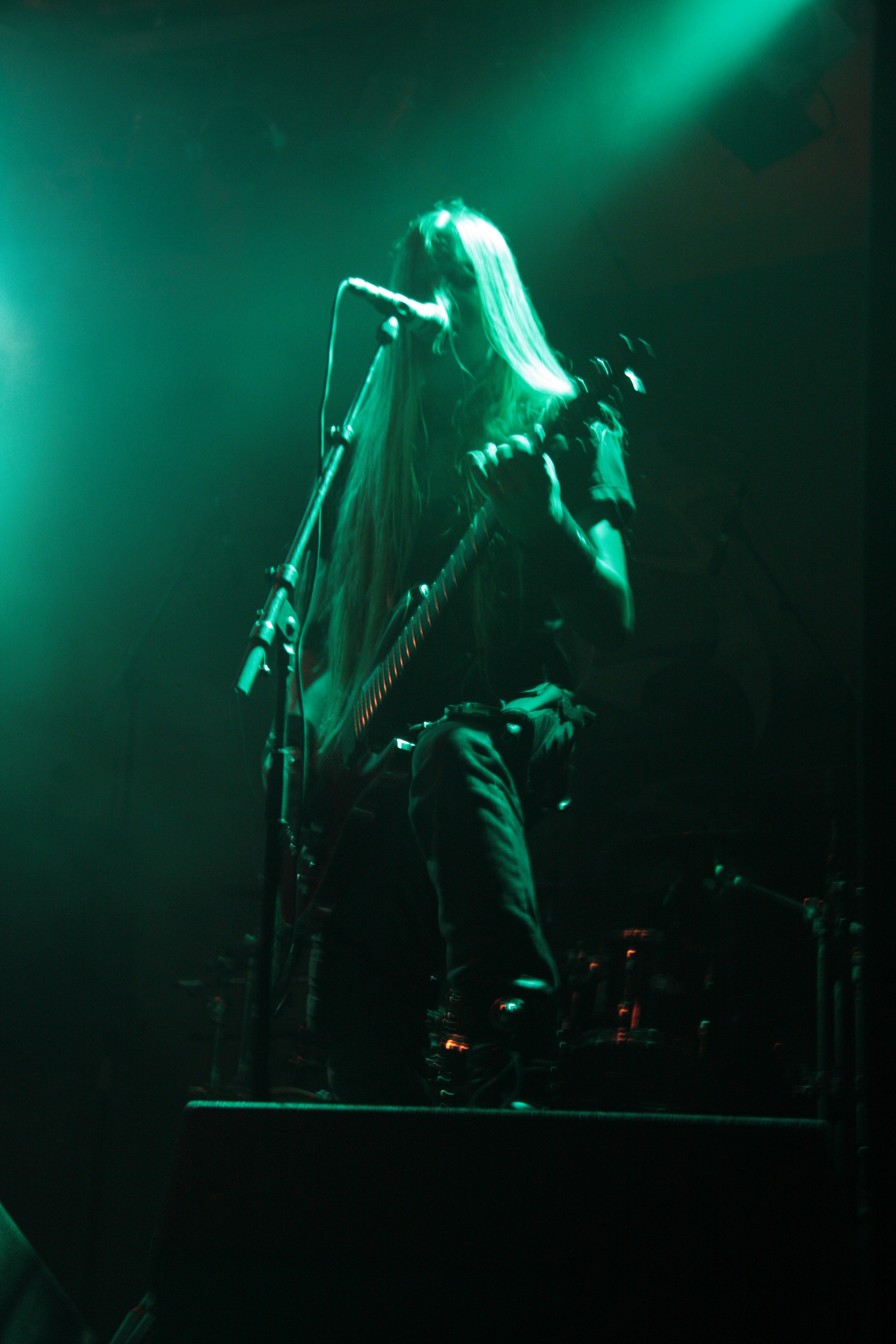
Zonaria at Occultfest 2010

=== Former members ===
- Christoffer Vikström – bass (2001–2003)
- Emil Nyström – guitar, backing vocals (2003–2012)
- Emanuel Isaksson – drums (2005–2012)
- Mikael Hammarberg – vocals (2001–2004)
- Claes-Göran Nydahl – drums (2001–2003)
- Niklas Lindroth – drums (2003–2004)
- Johan Aronsson – keyboards (2003–2004)
- Simon Carlén – drums (2004–2005)
- Karl Flodin – bass (2003–2005)
- Jerry Ekman – bass (2005–2007)
- Markus Åkebo – bass (2007–2011)
- Caleb Bingham – guitar (2011–2014)

=== Session members ===
Gustav Svensson – keyboards (2004–2005)

== Discography ==
=== Singles ===
Title	Release date	Label
Rendered in Vain	1 June 2006	Swedmetal Records

=== Albums ===
Title	Release date	Label
Infamy and the Breed	4 September 2007	Pivotal Rockordings
The Cancer Empire	17 October 2008	Century Media Records
Arrival of the Red Sun	23 July 2012	Listenable Records
