= The Blinded =

Swedish melodic death metal band

- Also known as: Stigmata (2000–2002); Blinded Colony (2002–2010)
- Origin: Karlshamn, Sweden
- Genres: Melodic death metal
- Years active: 2000–present
- Labels: Pivotal Rockordings, Scarlet, Soundholic
- Members: Joel Andersson; Linus Arelund Månsson; Tobias Olsson; Johan Blomstrom; Martin Bergman; Staffan Franzen
- Past members: Johan Olsson; Denny Axelsson; Johan Schuster; Roy Erlandsson; Christoffer Nilsson; Annika Haptén; Niklas Svensson
- Website: blindedcolony.com

The Blinded (formerly known as Stigmata and Blinded Colony) is a Swedish melodic death metal band from Karlshamn. Formed in 2000, they have released two studio albums and four EPs.

== History ==
=== Stigmata (2000–2002) ===
Guitarists Johan Blomstrom and Tobias Olsson and singer Niklas Svensson formed Blinded Colony in January 2000. At that point, the band was known as Stigmata. In June 2000, the band began recording their first demo, Painreceiver, and two new members were recruited: drummer Christoffer Nilsson and singer Annika Haptén. Later that summer, Staffan Franzén was officially announced as the bass player. After finishing the recording of Painreceiver, the band performed shows around Sweden, but began to lose interest and went on hiatus.

Six months later, Nilsson left the band and Staffan Franzén switched from bass to drums. Shortly after Nilsson's departure, Blomstrom and Olssons found bass player Roy Erlandsson. After reforming, Haptén quit the band due to musical differences. In 2002, the band's second demo, Tribute to Chaos, was released. Tribute to Chaos caught the attention of Italy-based Scarlet Records. Coinciding with their new record deal, the band officially changed their name to Blinded Colony.

=== Divine and Scarlet Records ===
Blinded Colony's debut studio album, Divine, was self-produced and released in 2003 through Scarlet Records throughout Europe and distributed in Japan through Soundholic Records. Blinded Colony and Scarlet Records parted ways a year later, after which Blinded Colony announced the departure of original vocalist Niklas Svensson and the addition of new vocalist Johan Schuster.

=== Bedtime Prayers and Pivotal Rockordings ===
The band recorded 2005's Promo Demo and released it in early April 2005. The demo caught the attention of U.S.-based record label Pivotal Rockordings.

After signing with Pivotal Rockordings, Blinded Colony began recording their second full-length album, Bedtime Prayers, in the spring of 2006. The band self-produced and recorded the album at their home studio, SoundPalace.Bedtime Prayers, was warmly received by underground metal circles and compared to the works of In Flames and Soilwork. A music video for the song "Once Bitten, Twice Shy" was made, but the proposed music video for the song "Heart" was cancelled.

In 2007, Blinded Colony completed the 'Outcasts Over Europe' tour in support of Ektomorf and former Scarlet Records labelmates Kayser. They shared the stage with former Pivotal Rockording labelmates Sonic Syndicate and Dark Tranquillity. After touring, Blinded Colony took part in summer festivals for 2007. In late August 2007, it was announced that vocalist Johan Schuster and bassist Roy Erlandsson had been replaced with Denny Axelsson and Johan Olsson. The reason for the split was cited to be "professional differences". After a winter spent writing new material, Tobias Olsson moved from guitar to bass and the band added guitarist Martin Bergman to fill the slot left by the switch. Although Pivotal Rockordings never released a press release about the departure of the band, they were unsigned and writing new material for their third full-length studio album. It was announced in October 2008 that vocalist Denny Axelsson and the band had parted ways citing "professional differences".

In May–June 2010, Blinded Colony announced that they had found a replacement for Johan and Axelsson, and that they would feature two vocalists, Linus and Joel.

After releasing new songs, it was announced that Blinded Colony would change its name to The Blinded. This change was due to the idea that the band consisted of different members and therefore was not the same blinded colony.

== Other media ==
The song "Once Bitten, Twice Shy" is featured in the Xbox 360/PlayStation 3 video game The Darkness. Prior to the release of Bedtime Prayers, the song "My Halo" was featured on the charity CD Project Suubi for Ugandan orphans.

== Members ==
=== Current members ===
- Joel Andersson – clean vocals
- Linus Arelund Månsson – harsh vocals
- Tobias Olsson – bass
- Martin Bergman – guitar
- Johan Blomstrom – guitar
- Staffan Franzen – drums (formerly bass)

=== Former members ===
- Christoffer Nilsson – drums
- Annika Haptén – vocals
- Niklas Svensson – vocals
- Johan Schuster – vocals
- Roy Erlandsson – bass
- Johan Olsson – bass

== Discography ==
=== Studio albums ===
- Divine (2003)
- Bedtime Prayers (2006)

=== Extended plays ===
- Painreceiver (2000)
- Tribute to Chaos (2002)
- Promo 2005 (2005)
- The Blinded (2010)
