= The Cancer Empire =

Studio album by Zonaria
- Released: October 17, 2008
- Recorded: Studio Fredman
- Genre: Melodic death metal, blackened death metal
- Length: 45:11
- Label: Century Media Records
- Producer: Fredrik Nordström

Zonaria chronology
Infamy and the Breed (2007)	The Cancer Empire (2008)	Arrival of the Red Sun (2012)

The Cancer Empire is the second major label release by Swedish metal band Zonaria and the first to be released on their new label, Century Media Records. It was recorded at Studio Fredman with Fredrik Nordström. Commented singer Simon Berglund:

The Cancer Empire refers to a nation that infects the world around it by spreading lies and deceit in order to dominate. For us it has a realistic reflection on the world today.

== Track listing ==
1. "Slaughter Is Passion" - 4:14
2. "Praise the Eradication" - 4:05
3. "Crowning King Cancer" - 5:46
4. "Contra Mundum" - 4:37
5. "Termination Process" - 3:32
6. "At War with the Inferior" - 3:21
7. "From the Abysmal Womb" - 5:26
8. "Damnation Dressed in Flesh" - 4:01
9. "Humanity vs. Sanity" 4:15
10. "The Icon and the Faceless" 5:55
11. "Mad World (Tears for Fears cover)" - 03:48 (Digital US bonus track)

== Credits ==
- Simon Berglund - Vocals/Guitar
- Emil Nyström - Guitar
- Markus Åkebo - Bass
- Emanuel "Cebbe" Isaksson - Drums
- Mastered by Peter In De Betou at Tailor Maid
- Artwork by Pär Olofsson
