= We Rule the Night =

2010 album by Sonic Syndicate

Studio album by Sonic Syndicate
- Released: August 27, 2010
- Recorded: January – February 2010 at Bohus Sound studios in Kungälv, Sweden
- Genres: Alternative metal, metalcore, nu metal
- Length: 40:24
- Label: Nuclear Blast
- Producer: Toby Wright

Sonic Syndicate chronology
Love and Other Disasters (2008)	We Rule the Night (2010)	Sonic Syndicate (2014)

We Rule the Night is the fourth studio album by Swedish metalcore band Sonic Syndicate. The album was released on August 27, 2010 through Nuclear Blast and was produced by Toby Wright. We Rule the Night is the first full-length release by the band to feature the vocals of Nathan James Biggs (former Hollow Earth Theory singer) who replaced former singer Roland Johansson who left the band in 2009. However, it is also the last album to feature founding members Richard and Roger Sjunnesson, who both left the band in October 2010 and May 2012 respectively. The band toured Europe to support the album with the "We Rule the World Tour", starting on September 15, 2010 with Christoffer Andersson standing in for Richard.

== Writing and recording ==
Sonic Syndicate started working on the pre-production of the new album as of January 2010 and soon after announced that the producer for the album would be legendary U.S. producer Toby Wright. The main recording of the album took place at Bohus Sound Studios in Kungälv, Sweden. February 23, 2010 announced that they were finished with the recording the album. As of March 2010, although the album was being mixed and mastered in Sweden, Toby Wright returned to USA to begin the final mixing and mastering on the album at the Paramount Studios in North Hollywood, California. As of March 7, 2010, the album was complete, although after much delay it wouldn't be released until six months later.

This is the first Sonic Syndicate album to have two lyricists and also the first album which Robin Sjunnesson makes a significant contribution to the songwriting, writing alongside the new singer Nathan J. Biggs seven songs on the album. This is one of many features that possibly gave We Rule The Night a very different sound compared to previous material.

== Release and promotion ==
On November 6, 2009, the band released the EP Burn This City featuring the single and radio version of the title track "Burn This City" and a non-album track called "Rebellion in Nightmareland". "Burn This City" went under a different mix for the album version to make it fit the style and sound of We Rule the Night. On May 4, 2010, Nuclear Blast offered a free download of the album version.

On March 5, 2010, the band revealed the title and artwork for We Rule the Night. The artwork was created by Gustavo Savez of Abstrata Art, the same artist who made the artwork for Burn This City in 2009. On March 19, 2010, the band revealed the full track listing of the standard CD version of the album and that there would be a limited digipack edition with a bonus DVD and two bonus tracks.

The lead single "Revolution, Baby!" had its world premiere on the Swedish radio station Bandit Rock on May 5, 2010. On May 7, 2010, the single was made available for purchase and download on iTunes. The music video directed by Patric Ullaeus premiered on the band's official MySpace page on May 17, 2010. It was only intended to be released as a digital single but unexpectedly a signed promotional CD-single was released for free for a limited time in a package with the official T-shirt merchandise for the single. On July 15, 2010, Nuclear Blast offered a free download of the single.

The second single "My Own Life" had its world premiere on Bandit Rock on July 6, 2010. The music video directed by Patric Ullaeus premiered on the band's official MySpace page on July 7, 2010. On August 6, 2010, the single was made available for purchase and download on iTunes.

The third single "Turn It Up" was released on August 22, 2010. The music video was not released until the end of September because of an accident while shooting the video causing Karin Axelsson a laceration as well as a brain concussion. At that moment, it wasn't certain if Karin would be able to perform at the band's next concerts, but she made a brilliant recovery and continued touring. on Sunday, August 7, 2010

On August 20, the whole album was released on the band's MySpace page. On September 13, the band offered for free for those who bought the 74th issue of the Sweden Rock magazine an exclusive maxi single including the unreleased track "Heart of Eve" and the previous singles "Burn This City" and "Revolution, Baby". "Heart of Eve" was originally planned to be released as the second bonus track for digipack on the album.

On October 1, Nuclear Blast released the official video for the single "Turn It Up" on Vimeo.

== Reception ==
Professional ratings
Review scores
Source	Rating
Metal Hammer	5/7 stars
Sputnikmusic	1/5 stars

We Rule the Night is a very diverse album compared to all of Sonic Syndicate's prior releases as it has a much more pop-friendly sound. Harsh vocals have a much smaller role, with melodic singing having nearly all prevalence. Former vocalist Richard Sjunnesson has stated in his blog that this was one of the reasons he quit the band. Upon its release, We Rule the Night received mixed reviews from critics. The band members themselves described the album as radically different from anything they had done in the past, which most reviewers agreed to, with the reactions being mostly positive from major magazines like Metal Hammer and Scream Magazine, but mostly negative by online reviewers, like Sputnikmusic who called the album "...one of the worst and most frustrating releases of 2010".

Along all We Rule the Night tracks, some of the most recognized songs by the critics were "Beauty and the Freak", "Burn This City" and "Break of Day", standing of as one of the albums stronger songs, while songs like "My Own Life" and "Turn It Up" were criticized for having too much pop influence. "Revolution, Baby" also stood out as the most genre-busting track for having nu metal influence.

== Track listing ==
All songs are credited to Nathan J. Biggs/Richard Sjunnesson (lyrics) and Sonic Syndicate (music) except Leave Me Alone by Peter Tägtgren and Jonas Kjellgren. Actual songwriters are listed below.

No.	Title	Lyrics	Music	Length
1.	"Beauty and the Freak"	Nathan J. Biggs; Richard Sjunnesson	Robin Sjunnesson; Roger Sjunnesson	3:32
2.	"Revolution, Baby!"	Nathan J. Biggs	Robin Sjunnesson	3:24
3.	"Turn It Up!"	Nathan J. Biggs	Robin Sjunnesson	3:38
4.	"My Own Life"	Nathan J. Biggs	Robin Sjunnesson	3:46
5.	"Burn This City"	Nathan J. Biggs	Robin Sjunnesson; Roger Sjunnesson	3:29
6.	"Black and Blue"	Nathan J. Biggs	Robin Sjunnesson; Roger Sjunnesson	3:29
7.	"Miles Apart"	Nathan J. Biggs	Roger Sjunnesson	3:39
8.	"Plans Are for People"	Richard Sjunnesson	Roger Sjunnesson	4:11
9.	"Leave Me Alone"	Peter Tägtgren	Peter Tägtgren; Jonas Kjellgren	3:56
10.	"Break of Day"	Richard Sjunnesson	Roger Sjunnesson	3:20
11.	"We Rule the Night"	Richard Sjunnesson	Roger Sjunnesson	4:00
Total length:				38:24

=== Bonus tracks ===
Digipack bonus track
No.	Title	Lyrics	Music	Length
12.	"Dead and Gone"	Richard Sjunnesson	Roger Sjunnesson	3:36
Total length:				42:00

Japan bonus track
No.	Title	Lyrics	Music	Length
13.	"Perfect Alibi"	Nathan J. Biggs	Robin Sjunnesson	3:41
Total length:				45:51

Tracks recorded during album sessions
No.	Title	Lyrics	Music	Length
1.	"Heart of Eve"	Richard Sjunnesson	Roger Sjunnesson	4:39

The track "Heart of Eve" was originally intended to be released as the Japanese exclusive bonus track, but was not included because Nuclear Blast didn't think it fitted the new sound they envisioned for the band. It was instead released as a single for Sweden Rock Magazine #74.

The track "Burn This City" was previously included on the Rebellion Pack and produced, engineered and originally mixed by Jonas Kjellgren. To match the sound with the other songs, the same recording (not a re-recording) went through a rough mix during the recording sessions by Toby Wright before going on to the final mix with the rest of the album.

== Bonus DVD ==
- "Studio Report" (Making of "We Rule the Night")
- "My Own Life" (Official video)
- "Revolution, Baby" (Official video)
- "Burn This City" (Official video)
- "Photo Gallery"

== Burn This City ==
Burn This City

EP by Sonic Syndicate
- Released: November 8, 2009
- Recorded: 2009
- Genres: Metalcore, alternative metal
- Length: 20:15
- Label: Nuclear Blast
- Producers: Jonas Kjellgren & Sonic Syndicate

Sonic Syndicate chronology
Love and Other Disasters (2008)	Burn This City (2009)	We Rule the Night (2010)

Burn This City EP is the first release by the band with Nathan James Biggs. It was released on November 8, 2009. A previously unreleased track from the recording session of Love and Other Disasters was meant to be re-recorded with Biggs, but they ultimately decided to write two brand new songs. The two new songs ended up being; the more radio friendly "Burn This City" and the more aggressive-sounding "Rebellion in Nightmareland," even an alternate radio mix of "Burn This City" in which some of Richard Sjunnesson's harsh vocals are removed.

Sonic Syndicate along with Patric Ullaeus won the award for best music video in 2010 at the Swedish Metal Awards, for their music video for "Burn This City."

=== Track listing ===
EP version

No.	Title	Lyrics	Music	Length
1.	"Burn This City (Single version)"	Nathan James Biggs	Robin Sjunnesson; Roger Sjunnesson	3:35
2.	"Rebellion in Nightmareland"	Richard Sjunnesson	Roger Sjunnesson	4:18
3.	"Burn This City (Radio Edit)"	Nathan James Biggs	Robin Sjunnesson; Roger Sjunnesson	3:32

Cancelled Tracks
No.	Title	Length
1.	"Phoenix Down (Reused by The Unguided)"
2.	"Assassination of a Martyr (Renamed "Icehart Fragment" and reused by The Unguided)"

During the recording session of "Burn This City" and "Rebellion in Nightmareland" several other tracks were made, but never recorded. All the songs were in their final stage but were thrown away as "Burn This City" and "Rebellion in Nightmareland" were the two tracks chosen for the EP. The tracks were completely scrapped when the band decided to only have new tracks (besides "Burn This City") on We Rule the Night.

== Release history ==
=== We Rule the Night ===
Region	Date	Label
Europe	August 27, 2010	Nuclear Blast
Sweden	September 1, 2010	Nuclear Blast

=== Burn This City ===
Region	Date	Label
Europe	November 8, 2009	Nuclear Blast

== Demo titles ==
- "Voxpop" (now known as "Miles Apart")
- "Fläskfärs" (now known as "Plans are for People")
- "Dicke" (now known as "Break of Day")
- "Gaymin" (now known as "We Rule the Night")
- "Bögslaget" (now known as "Dead and Gone")
- "Blonde stains bög" (now known as "Heart of Eve")
- "Mandelägg" (now known as "Rebellion in Nightmareland")

== Personnel ==
Sonic Syndicate

- Nathan James Biggs – clean vocals, unclean vocals
- Richard Sjunnesson – unclean vocals
- Robin Sjunnesson – lead guitar
- Roger Sjunnesson – rhythm guitar, keyboards, programming
- Karin Axelsson – bass guitar
- John Bengtsson – drums, percussion

Production

- Recorded at Bohus Sound studios in Kungälv, Sweden except
  Burn This City and Rebellion in Nightmareland; recorded at Black Lounge Studios in Avesta, Sweden
- Additional vocals recorded at Studio Mega, Varberg, Sweden
- Mixed at IF Studios, Gothenburg, Sweden
- Produced and Engineered by Toby Wright except
  Burn This City and Rebellion in Nightmareland; produced and engineered by Jonas Kjellgren
- Mixed by Roberto Laghi
- Mastered by Dragan Tanaskovic
- Engineered by Tobias Lindelll and Freddie Norén
- Additional keyboard/guitar engineering by Jonas Kjellgren
- Additional mixing by Toby Wright
- Addition mastering by Toby Wright
- All songs published by Prophecies Publishing
- All songs arranged by Sonic Syndicate and Toby Wright
- Artwork by Gustavo Sazes
- Photography by Limda Åkerberg
- Music videos for "Burn This City", "Revolution, Baby" and "My Own Life" directed by Patric Ullaeus
- Music video for "Turn It Up" directed by Anders Rune

== Chart positions ==
Country	Position
Sweden	13
Germany	22
Switzerland	42
Austria	44
Finland	29
