= Revolution, Baby =

Single by Sonic Syndicate

from the album We Rule the Night
- Released: May 17, 2010
- Recorded: 2010
- Genre: Alternative metal, nu metal
- Length: 3:24
- Label: Nuclear Blast
- Songwriter(s): Robin Sjunnesson & Nathan James Biggs

Sonic Syndicate singles chronology
"Burn This City" (2009)	"Revolution, Baby" (2010)	"My Own Life" (2010)

"Revolution, Baby" is the lead single of the fourth studio album We Rule the Night by the Swedish heavy metal band Sonic Syndicate. The single had its world premiere on the Swedish radio station Bandit Rock on May 5, 2010. On May 7, 2010, the single was made available for purchase and download on iTunes. The music video directed by Patric Ullaeus premiered on the band's official Myspace page on May 17, 2010. It was only intended to be released as a digital single but unexpectedly a signed promotional CD-single was released for free for a limited time in a package with the official T-shirt merchandise for the single. On July 15, 2010, Nuclear Blast offered a free download of the single.

== Background ==
During the recording of We Rule the Night the track "Heart of Eve" was originally intended to be released as the Japanese exclusive bonus track, but was not included because Nuclear Blast didn't think it fitted the new sound they envisioned for the band. It was instead released as an unreleased track on a maxi single of "Revolution, Baby" along with their previous single "Burn This City". The single was found exclusively on the Sweden Rock Magazine #74.

== Reception ==
Among all of the tracks on We Rule the Night, most critics agreed that "Revolution, Baby" stood out as one of the strongest tracks, as well as the most genre busting track on the album, bringing the biggest change as it doesn't touch the traditional Sonic Syndicate sound which combines the metalcore and melodic death metal genres, but alternative metal and nu metal.

== Track listing ==
CD single
No.	Title	Lyrics	Music	Length
1.	"Revolution, Baby"	Nathan James Biggs	Robin Sjunnesson	3:24

CD Maxi single
No.	Title	Lyrics	Music	Length
1.	"Revolution, Baby"	Nathan James Biggs	Robin Sjunnesson	3:32
2.	"Burn This City"	Nathan James Biggs	Robin Sjunnesson	3:29
3.	"Heart of Eve (Previously unreleased)"	Richard Sjunnesson	Roger Sjunnesson	4:39

iTunes single
No.	Title	Lyrics	Music	Length
1.	"Revolution, Baby"	Nathan James Biggs	Robin Sjunnesson	3:24

== Video ==
The video was directed by Patric Ullaeus who previously has been working with the bands on their shots of "Denied", "Enclave", "Jack of Diamonds", "My Escape" and "Burn This City". The video was shot in a skating park in Sweden and featured the band performing the song by themselves with no crowd. The video also featured slow motion captures and achieved positive criticism for its use of filming techniques at different positions and speed.

== Certifications ==
Certifications for "Revolution, Baby"
Region	Certification	Certified units/sales
Sweden (GLF)	Gold	20,000^{‡}
^{‡} Sales+streaming figures based on certification alone.
