= Stigma (Italian band) =

Italian band

- Origin: Mondovì, Piedmont, Italy
- Genres: Deathcore; melodic death metal; grindcore; metalcore (early)
- Years active: 2000—2012
- Labels: Nocturnal Brights, Stomp, Pivotal
- Members: Stefano "Vlad" Gehrsi; Andrea Bailo; Giacomo "Jack" Poli; Stefano Ghigliano; Flavio "Magna" Magnaldi
- Past members: Morgan Ferrua; Davide Garro (Live member); Gabriele Chiarla; Matteo Diano

Stigma was an Italian band based in Mondovì.

The group was founded in 2000 and played Metalcore but their musical style changed. Nowadays Stigma plays a mixture of Melodic Death Metal, Deathcore and Grindcore.

Their albums When Midnight Strikes! (2008) and Concierto for the Undead (2010) were released through the US label Pivotal Rockordings. 2010s album Concerto for the Undead was produced by Bring Me the Horizon guitarist Jona Weinhofen. The Japanese and Australian album version is distributet by Stomp Entertainment. Their digital EP The Undertaker which was produced by Simone Mulanori, Brandan Schieppati (musician of Bleeding Through) and Anaal Nathrakh musician Mick Kenney. Kenney and Shiepati founded Bombs of Death Productions. The cover artwork was designed by Daniel Mcbride who worked together designed covers for acts like Born of Osiris, Veil of Maya and After the Burial.

A music video for the song The Undertaker was directed by Salvatore Perroni who worked together with Devildriver, Suicide Silence, Evergreen Terrace and Adam Kills Eve.

== Success ==
The 2008s debut album When Midnight Strikes! acclaimed much critics in international music magazines like Metal Hammer, Metal.de, Rock Hard, and Legacy. Bruce Dickinson singer of Iron Maiden criticized this album on his Airplay (Iron Maiden Airplay) positively.

Stigma played a European tour which ended with a gig at belgish Ieperfest where the group shared stage with Bring Me the Horizon and August Burns Red. In 2010 Stigma played concerts in Hungary and Denmark and shared stage with groups like Amon Amarth, Legion of the Damned, Vader, Eluveitie and Marduk. The group was open act for Bleeding Through who played a gig in Rome on June 15, 2010.

== Discography ==
=== Demos ===
- 2003: Metamorphosis (Auto-production)

=== EPs ===
- 2005: Epitaph of Pain (Nocturnal Brights)
- 2011: The Undertaker (Pivotal Rockordings, digital only)

=== Albums ===
- 2008: When Midnight Strikes! (Pivotal Rockordings)
- 2010: Concerto for the Undead (Pivotal Rockordings, Stomp Entertainment)

== Musicians ==
=== Now ===
- Stefano "Vlad" Gehrsi – Vocals
- Andrea Bailo – Guitar
- Giacomo "Jack" Poli – Guitar
- Stefano Ghigliano – Drums, Percussion
- Flavio "Magna" Magnaldi – Bass guitar

=== Former ===
- Morgan Ferrua – Guitar
- Davide Garro – Guitar, Live member
- Gabriele Chiarla – Drums
- Matteo Diano – Bass guitar
