= Sonic Syndicate (album) =

Studio album by Sonic Syndicate
- Released: July 4, 2014
- Recorded: 2013–2014 at Bohus Sound studios in Kungalv, Sweden
- Genres: Metalcore, alternative metal
- Length: 44:02
- Label: Nuclear Blast
- Producer: Roberto Laghi

Sonic Syndicate chronology
| We Rule the Night (2010) | Sonic Syndicate (2014) | Confessions (2016) |

Singles from Sonic Syndicate
- 1. "Black Hole Halo" Released: May 16, 2014

Sonic Syndicate is the fifth studio album by Swedish metalcore band Sonic Syndicate. It is the first album by the band to not feature former members Richard and Roger Sjunnesson. The album features guest appearance from Björn "Speed" Strid of Soilwork on the track "Before You Finally Break", marking as the first time the band has collaborated with another artist on a studio album. It is the final album to feature long-time bassist Karin Axelsson and drummer John Bengtsson.

== Singles ==
On May 16, 2014, the band released the album's first single, entitled "Black Hole Halo". The lyric video to the song was released on Nuclear Blast's official YouTube channel the same day.

== Track listing ==
All tracks are written by Sonic Syndicate.

| No. | Title | Length |
|---|---|---|
| 1. | "Day of the Dead" | 4:09 |
| 2. | "Black Hole Halo" | 4:38 |
| 3. | "Long Road Home" | 5:04 |
| 4. | "My Revenge" | 4:26 |
| 5. | "Before You Finally Break" (featuring Björn Strid) | 3:31 |
| 6. | "Catching Fire" | 4:00 |
| 7. | "Unbreakable" | 5:02 |
| 8. | "It Takes Me" | 3:46 |
| 9. | "See What I See" | 2:51 |
| 10. | "So Addicted" | 5:47 |
| 11. | "The Flame that Changed the World" | 4:08 |
| Total length: | | 44:02 |

Digipack bonus track
| No. | Title | Length |
|---|---|---|
| 12. | "Diabolical Work of Art" | 6:00 |
| 13. | "What We Shared" | 4:32 |
| 14. | "Another Soldier Down" | 3:52 |
| Total length: | | 58:26 |

== Personnel ==
Band members

- Nathan J. Biggs - clean vocals, harsh vocals
- Robin Sjunnesson - guitar, harsh vocals
- Karin Axelsson - bass guitar
- John "Runken" Bengtsson - drums, percussion

Additional musicians

- Björn Strid - guest vocals (5)
