= Sonic Syndicate =

Swedish metal band

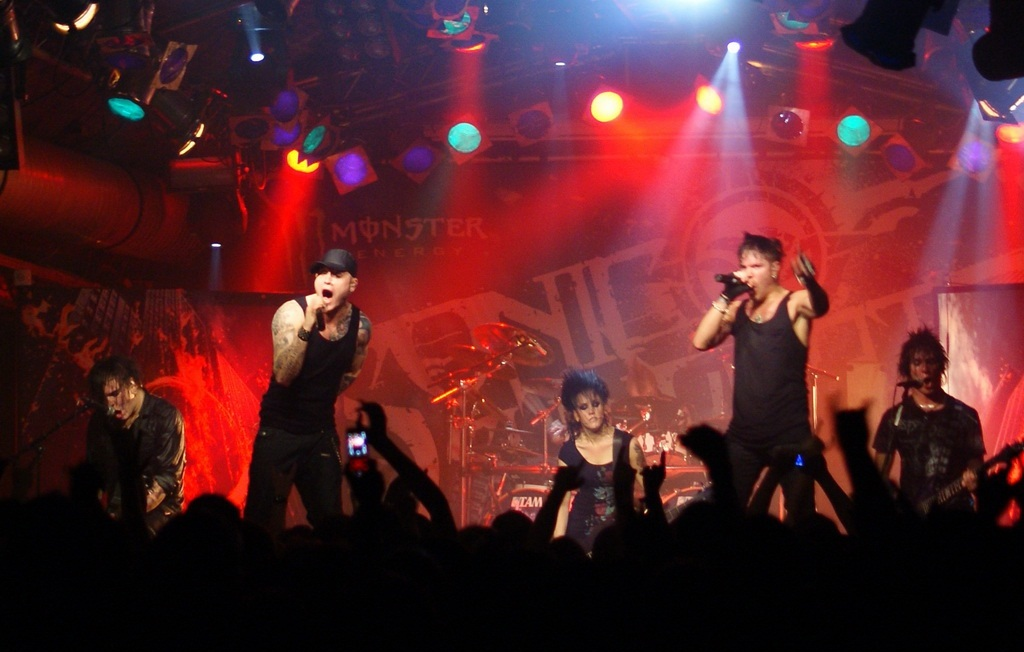
- Sonic Syndicate in 2010

Background information
- Also known as: Fallen Angels (2002–2005)
- Origin: Falkenberg, Sweden
- Genres: Metalcore; alternative metal; melodic death metal
- Years active: 2002–2018 (on hiatus)
- Labels: Pivotal; Nuclear Blast; Despotz
- Members: Nathan J. Biggs; Robin Sjunnesson; Michel Bärzén; Peter Wallenäs
- Past members: John Bengtsson; Karin Axelsson; Richard Sjunnesson; Roger Sjunnesson; Roland Johansson; Andreas Mårtensson; Kristoffer Backlund; Magnus Svensson

Sonic Syndicate was a Swedish metalcore band from Falkenberg. They were influenced by Swedish melodic death metal bands such as In Flames and Soilwork, as well as American metalcore bands like Killswitch Engage and All That Remains.

The band was founded in 2002 by brothers and songwriters Richard and Roger Sjunnesson (death growl vocals and guitars respectively), with their cousin Robin Sjunnesson (guitars) as Fallen Angels. They switched to Sonic Syndicate in 2005. The "classic" lineup from 2006 to 2009 included the Sjunnessons with Roland Johansson (clean vocals), Karin Axelsson (bass) and John Bengtsson (drums). Today, the band consists of Robin (now the only original member) alongside British singer Nathan J. Biggs and bass player Michel Bärzén. Since their fourth album, We Rule the Night, their sound shifted away from metal toward a pop rock style. The band ceased to perform live or release new music by 2018 and has since been on hiatus.

== History ==
=== Formation and Eden Fire (2002–2006) ===
Before Sonic Syndicate, brothers Richard and Roger and their cousin Robin Sjunnesson played in heavy metal-oriented band Tunes of Silence, which was formed in 2000. In 2002, the brothers left the band to focus on other aspects of music. This led to forming Fallen Angels in 2002 with Andreas Mårtensson, Magnus Svensson, and Kristoffer Backlund. They recorded three demo albums, Fall From Heaven, Black Lotus, and Extinction, before signing with Pivotal Rockordings in 2005. Bassist Karin Axelsson replaced Svensson in 2004 before the band changed its name to Sonic Syndicate and released its debut studio album, Eden Fire. Eden Fire sold over 10,000 copies by the end of 2010 because of a re-release through Koch Distribution in the US in collaboration with France's Listenable Records.

The band toured Sweden in support of Eden Fire, alongside such bands as Avatar. In early February 2006, during their tour with Avatar, drummer Kristoffer Bäcklund and keyboardist Andreas Mårtensson were asked to leave the band due to lack of interest and musical differences. Bäcklund was replaced with John Bengtsson, whilst lead guitarist Roger Sjunnesson took over on keyboards. Roland Johansson joined permanently in 2006. The band completed the tour and began demoing new material in early March.

=== Only Inhuman (2006–2007) ===
In the summer of 2006, the band entered a Nuclear Blast contest. They sent their self-titled demo, Sonic Syndicate, which included early versions of the songs "Psychic Suicide", "Blue Eyed Fiend", "Callous" and the album version of "Jailbreak". Sonic Syndicate beat over 1,500 other bands and signed a recording contract with the label. In November 2006, they entered Black Lounge Studios to record their follow-up to Eden Fire with Jonas Kjellgren of Scar Symmetry. The album Only Inhuman was released on 18 May 2007. A video was made for the lead single, "Denied", with producer Patric Ullaeus.

Sonic Syndicate's singers, Richard Sjunnesson and Roland Johansson, sang for the compilation album Nuclear Blast All-Stars: Out of the Dark with Soilwork guitarist Peter Wichers. The band played at the 2007 Wacken Open Air Festival. Sonic Syndicate played several European festivals and, in the winter of 2007, accompanied Amon Amarth as they toured stateside. The band participated in the "Darkness Over X-Mas Tour" with Caliban and Heaven Shall Burn, and toured Europe with Dark Tranquillity and Soilwork. In late November 2007, they toured with Himsa and Amon Amarth. In 2008, they toured with Finnish symphonic metal band Nightwish.

=== Love and Other Disasters (2008–2009) ===
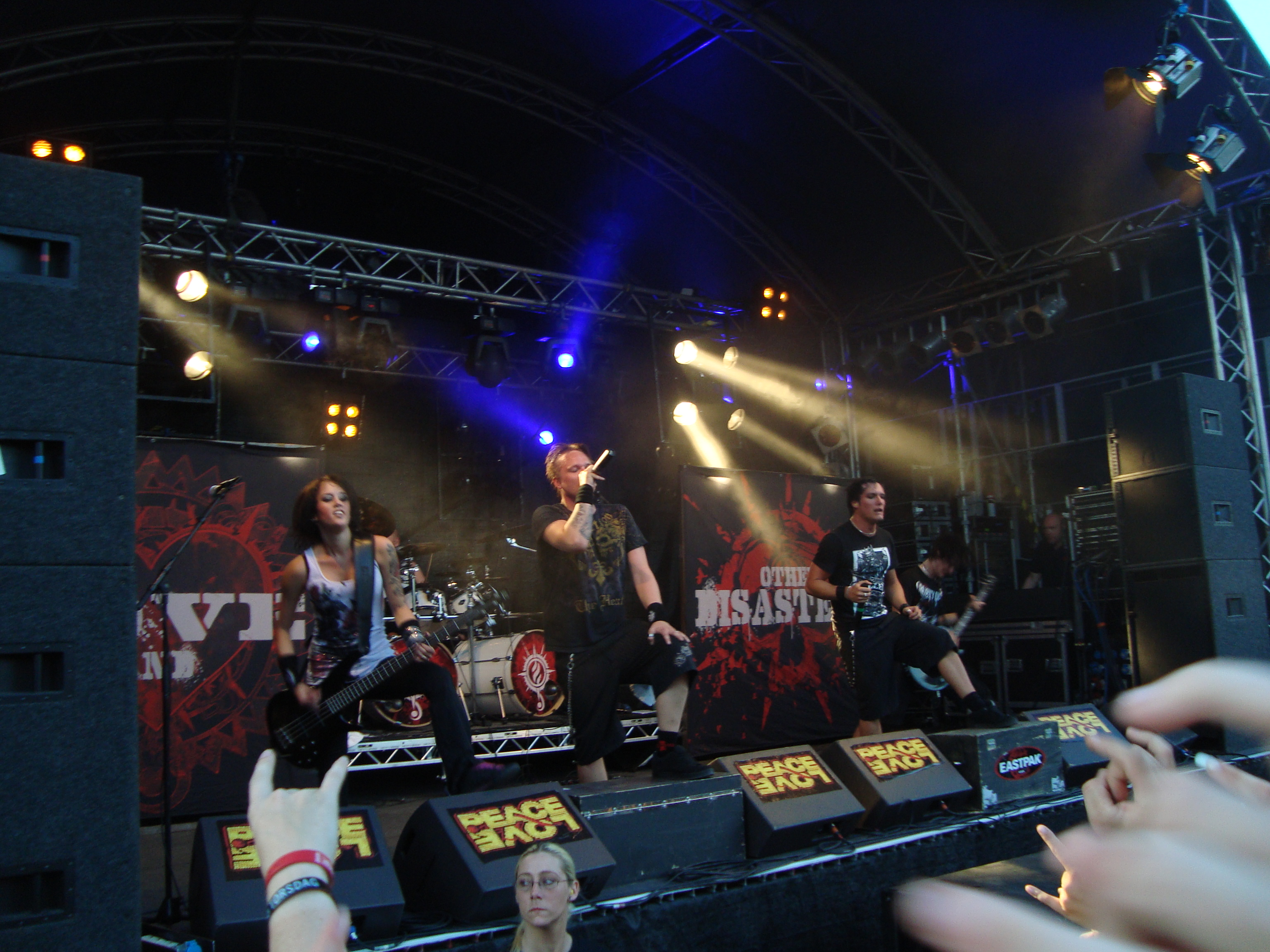
Sonic Syndicate in 2009

In March 2008, the band began recording their third release in Jonas Kjellgren's Black Lounge Studios in Avesta. In May 2008, Sonic Syndicate returned to North America as the opening act for Nightwish. In the June 2008, the magazine Revolver named Karin Axelsson the "Hottest Chick in Metal". Love and Other Disasters was released in September 2008. The first single, "Jack of Diamonds", was accompanied by a video again from Patric Ullaeus, who has directed all of the band's videos. Not long after, the second single "My Escape" would follow up, also accompanied by a video from Patric Ullaeus. At the end of the year, the band toured Germany and Scandinavia, and released the singles "Power Shift" and "Contradiction" directed by Marius Böttcher of Quent Film.

On 30 March 2009, it was confirmed that singer Roland Johansson would quit the band because of personal reasons. A search for a replacement immediately went underway, whilst Roland stayed in the band until 29 August, the day of his last show with the band at the Geuzenpop Festival in Enschede, Netherlands (five days after Nathan J. Biggs was announced as the new singer).

On 13 October, Roland Johansson expounded in an interview that his reason for leaving Sonic Syndicate was that he felt severe anxiety and dislike for the lifestyle that went with having to tour all around the world and not being able to spend much time with his loved ones. He also shared that he and Jesper Strömblad (formerly of In Flames) are currently working on an unnamed project, and would start recording an album in the beginning of 2010 (although, as of April 2011, there has still been no sign of any material from the two).

=== Burn This City (2009) ===
On 24 August 2009, British vocalist Nathan James Biggs (formerly of The Hollow Earth Theory) was announced as Roland Johansson's replacement. The band has also announced that their next studio album would be released in March 2010. On 25 September, Sonic Syndicate released their debut single with Nathan entitled "Burn This City" and its music video. Shortly after the single release, the band began to stream their other new track "Rebellion in Nightmareland", which was released onto the band's Myspace page.

=== We Rule the Night (2010–2011) ===
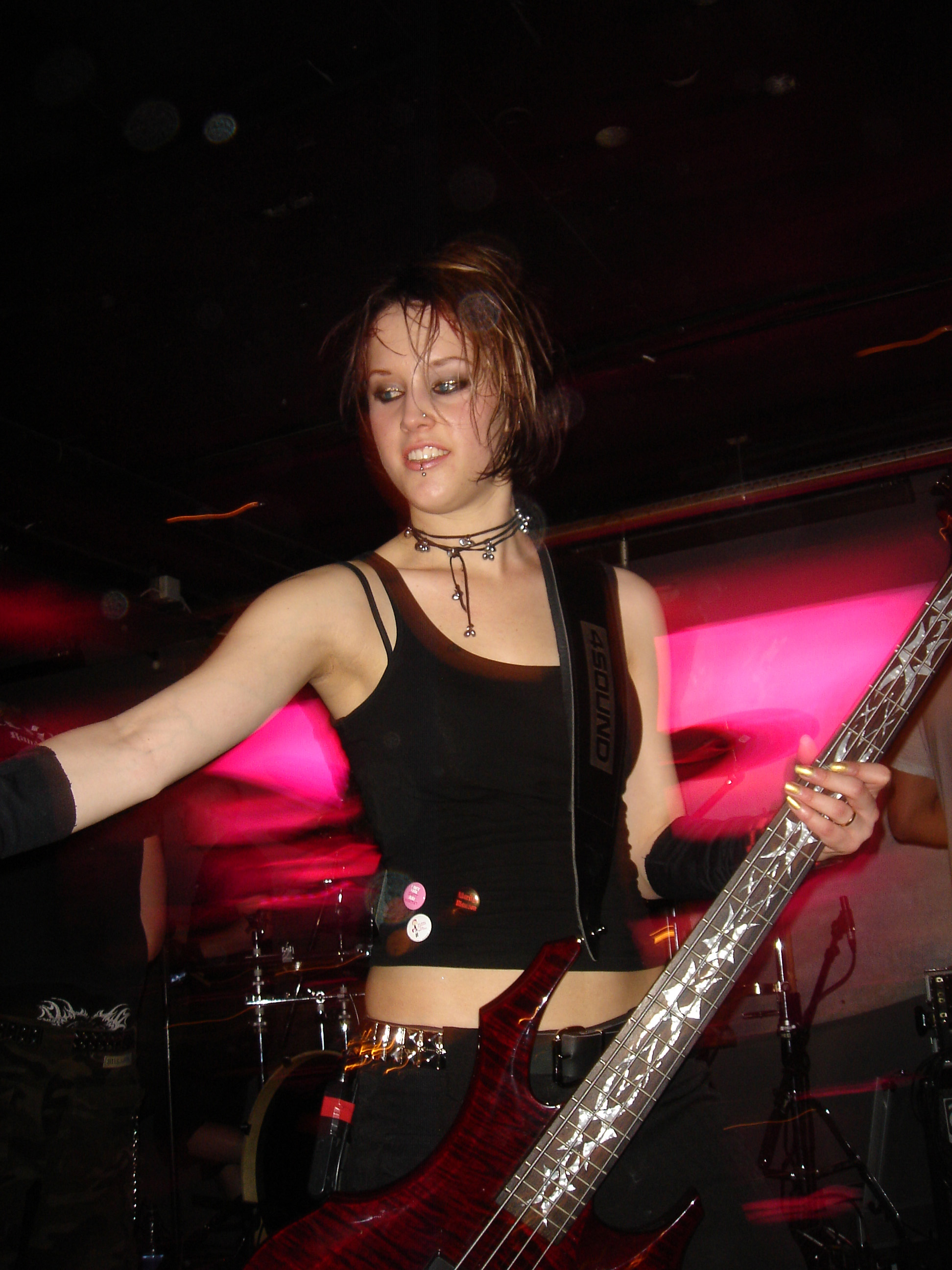
Karin Axelsson in 2010

Work on the pre-production of a new album begun on 3 January 2010 under producer Toby Wright, recorded at Bohus Sound Studios in Kungälv, Sweden. On 5 March, the band announced that the title for the new album would be We Rule the Night. The album was originally scheduled to be released on 28 May 2010 but was later reset to 30 July 2010. The release date was again pushed back and the album was released on 28 August 2010.

The first single from the album is "Revolution, Baby". It appeared first on 5 May on Bandit Rock Radio and was then released to iTunes on 7 May. On 16 April, the video shoot for the music video took place. The director for the shoot was again director Patric Ullaeus.

On 3 June, Sonic Syndicate traveled to Gothenburg, Sweden and began shooting the music video for the second single "My Own Life" with Patric Ullaeus of Revolver Film Company. The single debuted on Bandit Radio on 18 June 2010 and was released as a digital single. On 1 July 2010, Nuclear Blast and Guthenborg TV released the making of the music video for "My Own Life".

The single "Turn It Up" was released on 22 August 2010, followed by the album We Rule the Night on 27 August 2010. During the filming of "Turn It Up", Karin Axelsson was reportedly "seriously injured." Axelsson was hit over the head with a guitar during an act of staged violence, causing a laceration and a brain concussion. Axelsson later made a "brilliant" recovery. On 29 September, the video was released, but it was banned on most websites due to its graphic content (including female nudity), and it also resulted in the deletion of their Facebook page (although they created a new one in late 2011). Eventually, a censored video of the song was released, and Nuclear Blast would re-upload the uncut version of the video to other sites.

On 26 October 2010, it was announced that Richard would take a break from touring for personal reasons and to spend time with his family; however, on 28 October, Richard corrected this statement on his blog that his leave was, in fact, permanent due to creative differences. He claimed that the band's label were responsible for changing the musical direction of the band, and expressed disappointment in the band members as a whole for trying to deviate too far from their death metal roots during the recording of We Rule the Night. Christoffer Andersson (of What Tomorrow Brings) filled in the remaining tour dates for Richard but did not become his permanent replacement due to other commitments. Richard went on to form The Unguided with other former Sonic Syndicate members and also joined melodic death metal band Faithful Darkness for a brief period.

After Andersson quit, the role was partially given to guitarist Robin.

=== Self-titled, Confessions and hiatus (2011–2018) ===
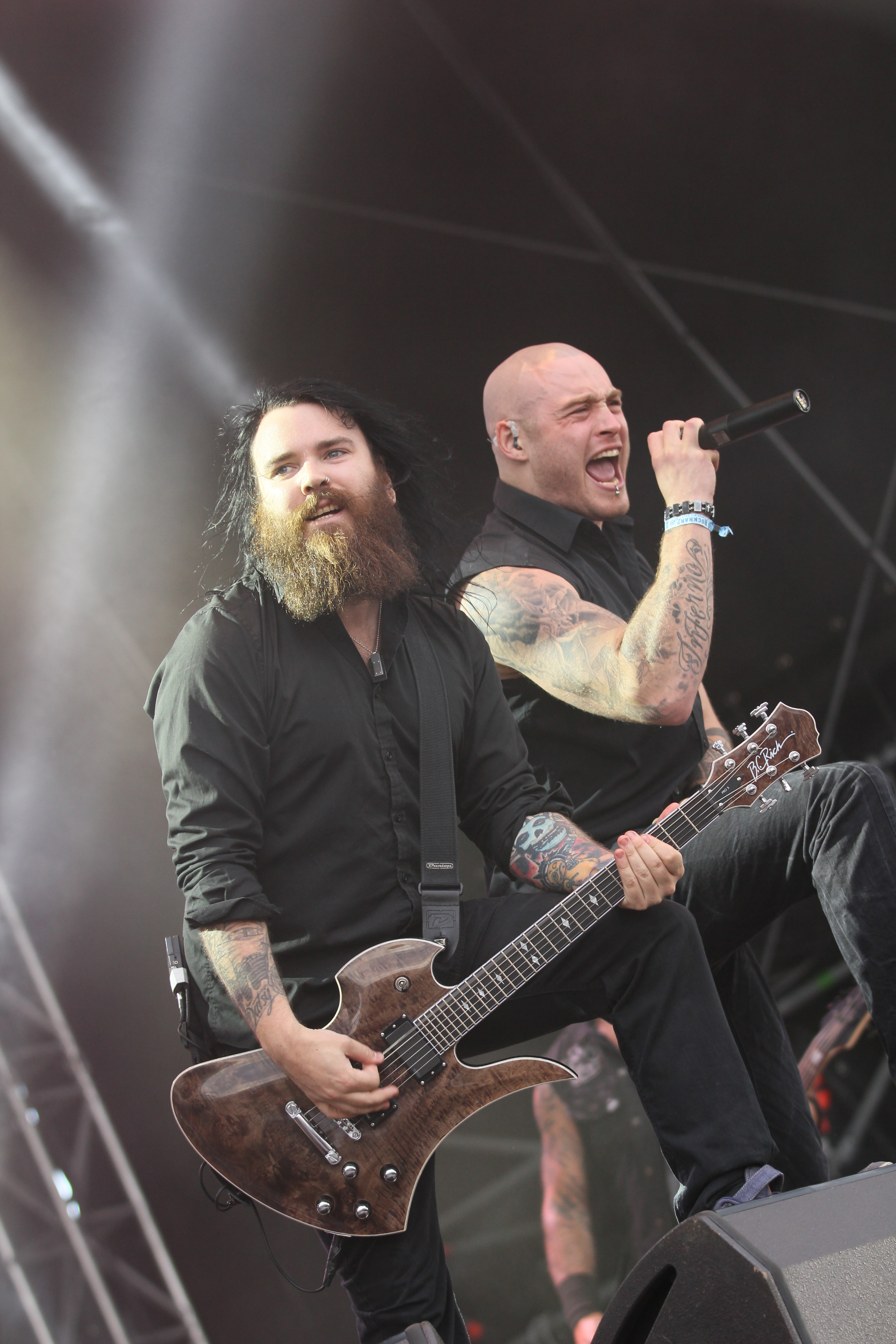
Robin Sjunnesson and Nathan James Biggs in 2014

In September 2011, Roger stated in an interview (in Swedish) that the band would be taking a break after the summer. Roger and John both focused on The Unguided, Nathan begun reviewing music for Metal Hammer, and Karin has begun to study.

On 7 May 2012, the band announced on Facebook that they would get together once more to co-headline Vekeri Fesztival in Hungary on 21–23 June. Shortly afterwards, Roger Sjunnesson announced that he was no longer a part of the band. Since then, the band has continued with only Robin on guitar duties.

On 5 May 2013, the band announced via Twitter that the hiatus is over. They also announced that they had begun the process of recording a new album. It was announced on 25 April 2014 that the new self-titled album would be released on 4 July. It was also revealed that Björn Strid from Soilwork would provide guest vocals on the track "Before You Finally Break". The band released the first single off the album titled "Black Hole Halo"; the lyric video was released on Nuclear Blast's official YouTube channel on 16 May. The new self-titled album was released on 4 July 2014.

On 7 August 2015, it was announced that Karin Axelsson had left the band and would be replaced by new bassist Michel Bärzén. Then a year later, it was announced that their next album, Confessions, would be released on 14 October 2016.

After the release of the album, the band played a handful of shows throughout 2016, as well as in 2017 and 2018, with their last show so far taking place on 4 August 2018. In a short update posted on their Facebook page in December that year, the band mentioned they were writing songs, but has slowly stopped updating their social media since.

== Musical style ==
Sonic Syndicate's style has changed radically over the years. Fallen Angels' demos contained no clean vocals at all and had a similar sound to early melodic death metal bands such as Dark Tranquillity and In Flames. Eden Fire featured clean vocals on some tracks as well as some occasional female vocals from bass player Karin Axelsson.

Their second album Only Inhuman had many new additions to the band's sound. Clean vocals were now a full-time feature (by this point, the band had two vocalists rather than one) and the band began to include metalcore elements into their music. It also included the band's first recorded ballad ("Enclave"). Love and Other Disasters featured less "flashy" synths (mostly strings) and mostly slower songs than before and was commercially more successful than Only Inhuman and Eden Fire.

Their 2009 EP Burn This City featured two songs. The title track was radio friendly with mostly clean vocals and synthesizers while the song "Rebellion in Nightmareland" had a somewhat similar sound to Eden Fire and Only Inhuman being very aggressive in dynamic and having both clean vocals and screams lead together.

Their fourth album We Rule the Night is a very soft album compared to all their prior releases, as it includes their sound of metalcore but also incorporates new ones to their style such as pop rock and nu metal. There is also a fair use of acoustic guitars as well as mainstream-influenced synthesizers. Clean vocals are also featured as the lead vocals compared to their previous albums were both harsh and clean vocals were leading together; on We Rule the Night, however, the harsh vocals have been mixed behind layers of distorted guitars, acoustic guitars and mainstream synthesizers, and the clean vocals were left untouched to appeal to a younger, more mainstream audience.

From the beginning to Love and Other Disasters, all of Sonic Syndicate's songs were written by lead guitarist/keyboardist Roger (music) and harsh vocalist Richard Sjunnesson (lyrics) with the exception of "Enclave", where the music was written by other (rhythm) guitarist Robin Sjunnesson and clean singer Roland Johansson. Robin and Roland together wrote the music to about five songs on Love and Other Disasters, with the rest by Roger and all the lyrics as normal were written by Richard. Burn This City and We Rule The Night, however, featured a second lyricist (new singer Nathan J. Biggs) as well as Robin now composing half the music for Sonic Syndicate. This is thought to be one of many things that made We Rule the Night different from their early material.

== Band members ==
=== Current ===
| Name | Role | Duration | Additional information |
|---|---|---|---|
| Nathan James Biggs | lead vocals | 2009–2018 | Lyricist. Former singer of The Hollow Earth Theory. |
| Robin Sjunnesson | guitar, unclean vocals | 2002–2018 (vocals since 2011) | Composer (since 2007). |
| Michel Bärzén | bass | 2015–2018 | |
| Daniel Petri | drums, percussion | 2017–2018 | Live support drummer. |

=== Former ===
| Name | Role | Duration | Reason for departure and other projects |
|---|---|---|---|
| John Bengtsson | drums, percussion | 2006–2016 | Quit to focus on his family. Former drummer of DØDZ & The Unguided. |
| Karin Axelsson | bass, clean vocals | 2004–2015 | Quit due to personal/family reasons. |
| Roger Sjunnesson | guitars & synths | 2002–2012 | Composer (until 2012). Now performs with The Unguided. |
| Richard Sjunnesson | screamed vocals | 2002–2010 | Main lyricist (until 2010). Now performs with The Unguided. |
| Roland Johansson | clean & screamed vocals | 2005 (guest); 2006–2009 (full-time) | Quit due to issues with touring and personal life. Former member of The Unguided. |
| Kristoffer Bäcklund | drums, percussion | 2002–2006 | Asked to leave due to lack of devotion to the band. Later became vocalist for What Tomorrow Brings. |
| Andreas Mårtensson | keyboards | 2002–2006 | Asked to leave due to lack of devotion to the band. |
| Magnus Svensson | bass guitar | 2002–2004 | Undisclosed. |

=== Session musicians ===
| Name | Instrument | Membership | Reason for departure and current bands |
|---|---|---|---|
| Christoffer Andersson | harsh vocals | 2010–2011 | Filled in for Richard Sjunnesson after his departure in 2010, former scream vocalist of Dead By April (2013–2017). |
| Robert Sjunnesson | lead guitar | 2005 | Performed a guest guitar solo on "Soulstone Splinter" from Eden Fire. |
| Nick Red | keyboards | 2008 | Performed keyboards on "My Escape," "Fallout" & "Contradiction" from Love and Other Disasters. Currently plays in Blowsight. |
| Peter Wallenäs | drums, percussion | 2016–2017 | Live support drummer. |

== Discography ==
Studio albums

- Eden Fire (2005)
- Only Inhuman (2007)
- Love and Other Disasters (2008)
- We Rule the Night (2010)
- Sonic Syndicate (2014)
- Confessions (2016)

== Awards ==
In 2008, Sonic Syndicate won the award for best newcomer at the Swedish Metal Awards and at the Bandit Rock Awards. Sonic Syndicate, along with Patric Ullaeus, won the award for best music video for their music video of "Burn This City" in 2010 at the Swedish Metal Awards. They also nominated and won the award for "Best Swedish Group" at the Bandit Rock Awards of 2010. In 2010, Sonic Syndicate was nominated for "Up and Coming!" award at the Metal Hammer Awards in Germany.
