= Only Inhuman =

Studio album by Sonic Syndicate
- Released: May 18, 2007
- Recorded: Black Lounge Studios in Avesta, Sweden
- Genre: Melodic death metal, metalcore
- Length: 42:17
- Label: Nuclear Blast
- Producer: Jonas Kjellgren

Sonic Syndicate chronology
Eden Fire (2005)	Only Inhuman (2007)	Love and Other Disasters (2008)

Alternative covers
- Japanese cover

Singles from Only Inhuman
- 1. "Denied" Released: April 27, 2007; 2. "Enclave" Released: June 22, 2007

Professional ratings
Review scores
Source	Rating
AllMusic	3/5 stars

Only Inhuman is the second studio album by Swedish melodic death metal band Sonic Syndicate. Released May 18, 2007 in Europe and on May 22, 2007, in North America. It's also the first album the band released through their new label, Nuclear Blast, as well as the first to feature vocalist Roland Johansson and drummer John Bengtsson as full-time members.

The album was produced by Jonas Kjellgren, one of the guitar players of the Swedish melodic death metal band Scar Symmetry. A limited edition of the album features a bonus track, entitled "Freelancer", while the Japanese edition contains "My Soul In #000000". The album ranked number 22 on the Swedish charts after one week of sales.

Only Inhuman was re-released in North America on May 6, 2008. The re-release, dubbed "Only Inhuman Tour Edition" includes a bonus DVD containing the videos for the songs "Denied" and "Enclave" as well as a photography section and a live performance of the band, filmed in Cologne, Germany on June 21, 2007.

Only Inhuman is sometimes considered the band's true debut album since Eden Fire consisted mostly of remade songs which were originally released when the band was still called Fallen Angels.

== Track listing ==
All lyrics are written by Richard Sjunnesson; all music is composed by Roger Sjunnesson, except where noted.

No.	Title	Lyrics	Music	Length
1.	"Aftermath"			4:11
2.	"Blue Eyed Fiend"			3:52
3.	"Psychic Suicide"			3:50
4.	"Double Agent 616"			3:54
5.	"Enclave"		Roland Johansson; Robin Sjunnesson	4:08
6.	"Denied"			3:51
7.	"Callous"			3:49
8.	"Only Inhuman"			4:12
9.	"All About Us" (t.A.T.u. cover)	The Veronicas	Billy Steinberg; Josh Alexander	2:47
10.	"Unknown Entity"	Niklas Fagerström; Richard Sjunnesson	Niklas Fagerström; Roger Sjunnesson	3:55
11.	"Flashback"			3:41

=== Bonus tracks ===
Limited Edition
No.	Title	Length
12.	"Freelancer"	3:43

Japanese Edition
No.	Title	Length
12.	"My Soul In #000000"	3:45
13.	"Freelancer"	3:38

== Tour edition ==
The tour edition features the original Only Inhuman album (with Limited Edit bonus track "Freelancer") and a DVD with live performance of the band in Cologne, Germany(from. WDR Rockpalast). There was also a reissue of the Tour Edition which had different artwork but did not include the live DVD. The live-DVD can also rarely be bought separate from the album. The separated DVD version has the same cover as the Tour Edition, only retitled to Live Inhuman (which is the original name of the tour-DVD). The "Live Inhuman" version is a rare Nuclear Blast exclusive release.

== Chart positions ==
Country	Position
Sweden	22

== Personnel ==
Sonic Syndicate

- Richard Sjunnesson – screamed vocals
- Roland Johansson – clean vocals
- Roger Sjunnesson – guitars & electronics
- Robin Sjunnesson – guitars
- Karin Axelsson – bass guitar
- John Bengtsson – drums

Production

- Jonas Kjellgren – producer/mixer/master/engineer
- Christian Silver – co-producer (drums only)
- Torsten Bürgin – artwork
- Sabine Hauptmann – artwork
- Solile Siirtola – photography
- Patric Ullaeus – director (Denied and Enclave)
