= Love and Other Disasters (album) =

Studio album by Sonic Syndicate
- Released: 19 September 2008
- Recorded: March – April 2008 at Black Lounge Studios in Avesta, Sweden
- Genres: Melodic death metal, metalcore, alternative metal
- Length: 40:18
- Label: Nuclear Blast
- Producer: Jonas Kjellgren

Sonic Syndicate chronology
Only Inhuman (2007)	Love and Other Disasters (2008)	We Rule the Night (2010)

Alternative covers
- Japanese cover.

Alternative cover
- The Rebellion Pack cover.

Singles from Love and Other Disasters
- 1. "Jack of Diamonds" Released: 2008; 2. "My Escape" Released: 2008; 3. "Power Shift" Released: 2009

Love and Other Disasters is the third album by Swedish heavy metal band Sonic Syndicate. It was released on 19 September 2008 and on 14 October in North America. A digipack version of the album was made available featuring two bonus tracks and a DVD. In the United States, the album sold around 800 copies in its first week; landing it on the Billboard Heatseekers chart at 85. Love and Other Disasters is the last album by the band to feature former singer Roland Johansson, and the last to be produced by Jonas Kjellgren. It is also the only album by the band to feature the same line-up as the preceding one.

On 27 June the lead single of the album called "Jack of Diamonds" was released to radio, the same day it was performed live for the first time on the Metaltown Festival in 2008. Two other singles were also released: "My Escape" and "Power Shift". A 14th track titled "Freeman" was also made but it was never officially released.

== Reception ==
Professional ratings
Review scores
Source	Rating
IGN	4/10 stars
ChartAttack	3/5 stars
Lords of Metal	8.5/10 stars

AllMusic critic Tom Forget wrote that the "mature, elegantly constructed" Love and Other Disasters "successfully synthesize[s] classic twisting leads, death metal complexity and power, and synth-abetted melody." He further noted, "Songs like 'Hellgate: Worcester' find room for both whiplash guitars and soaring keyboards that subtly recall 1980s new wavers like OMD in their glittering grandeur. 'Contradiction' goes even further, coming as close to radio rock as Sonic Syndicate dares, and it's an admirable stretch."

== Track listing ==
All lyrics are written by Richard Sjunnesson, except where noted; all music is composed by Roger Sjunnesson, except where noted.

No.	Title	Music	Length
1.	"Encaged"		4:26
2.	"Hellgate: Worcester"	Roland Johansson; Robin Sjunnesson (Note: Credited to Sonic Syndicate)	3:23
3.	"Jack of Diamonds"		3:41
4.	"My Escape"	Roland Johansson; Robin Sjunnesson; Nick Red	4:10
5.	"Fallout"	Roland Johansson; Robin Sjunnesson; Nick Red	3:51
6.	"Power Shift"	Jonas Kjellgren; Roger Sjunnesson	3:32
7.	"Contradiction"	Roland Johansson; Robin Sjunnesson; Nick Red	3:32
8.	"Damage Control"		3:49
9.	"Red Eyed Friend"		4:43
10.	"Affliction"		5:11

=== Bonus tracks ===
Limited/Amazon Edition
No.	Title	Music	Length
11.	"Ruin"	Roland Johansson; Robin Sjunnesson	3:42
12.	"Dead Planet"		4:21

Japanese Edition (includes limited/Amazon edition bonus tracks)
No.	Title	Length
13.	"Mission: Undertaker"	5:03

The Rebellion Pack
No.	Title	Lyrics	Music	Length
1.	"Burn This City"	Nathan James Biggs (Note: Credited to Nathan James Biggs & Richard Sjunnesson)	Robin Sjunnesson; Roger Sjunnesson	3:29
2.	"Rebellion In Nightmareland"			4:13
3.	"Burn This City (Radio Edit)"	Nathan James Biggs	Robin Sjunnesson; Roger Sjunnesson	3:32

Track recorded during album sessions
No.	Title	Lyrics	Music	Length
1.	"Freeman"	Richard Sjunnesson	Roger Sjunnesson	3:57

== Bonus DVD ==
- "Studio Report" (Making of "Love and Other Disasters")
- "Jack of Diamonds" (Official video)
- "My Escape" (Official video)
- "Denied" (Official video)
- "Enclave" (Official video)
- "Psychic Suicide" (live in Cologne)
- "Blue Eyed Fiend" (live in Cologne)
- Shopping in Paris

== The Rebellion Pack ==
The special edition of the album was reissued on November 6, 2009 together with the band's 2009 Rebellion EP, featuring two brand-new songs as well as the debut record with their new singer Nathan Biggs, replacing Roland Johansson.

== Demo titles ==
- "Bullet My Asshole" (pre-"Encaged")
- "Finnish" (pre-"Jack of Diamonds")
- "Kjellgren" ("Stewart" in English, pre-"Power Shift")
- "Breaking Benjamin's Leg" (pre-"Contradiction")
- "Export" (pre-"Damage Control")
- "Blame Canada" (pre-"Affliction")
- "Bandit" (pre-"Mission: Undertaker")
- "Panic" (pre-"Freeman")

== Chart positions ==
Country	Position
Sweden	15
Germany	36
Austria	45
Switzerland	65
United States	85 (Billboard Heatseekers)

== Personnel ==
Sonic Syndicate

- Roland Johansson – clean vocals, additional guitars & solo on "Red Eyed Friend"
- Richard Sjunnesson – harsh vocals
- Roger Sjunnesson – guitars, keyboards
- Robin Sjunnesson – guitars
- Karin Axelsson – bass guitars
- John Bengtsson – drums, percussion
- Nathan James Biggs - vocals ("Burn This City" & "Rebellion in Nightmareland")

Additional musicians

- Nick Red – keyboards on "My Escape," "Fallout" & "Contradiction"

Production

- Jonas Kjellgren – producer/engineer
- Roberto Laghi – mixer
- Achim Köhler – masterer
- Torsten Bürgin – artwork
- Sabine Hauptmann – artwork
- Micke Johansson – photography
- Patric Ullaeus – director ("Jack of Diamonds" & "My Escape")
- Marius Böttcher – director ("Power Shift" & "Contradiction")
