= Eden Fire =

Studio album by Sonic Syndicate
- Released: September 13, 2005; December 9, 2008
- Recorded: February – June, 2005 at Studiomega
- Genre: Melodic death metal
- Length: 42:59
- Language: English
- Label: Pivotal Rockordings
- Producers: Christian Silver and Manne Engström

Sonic Syndicate chronology
Extinction (2004)	Eden Fire (2005)	Only Inhuman (2007)

Professional ratings
Review scores
Source	Rating
Allmusic	3/5 stars
Blabbermouth.net	7/10 stars
Sea of Tranquility	4/4 stars
Sputnikmusic	1.5/5 stars
Metal Storm	7.5/10 stars

Eden Fire is the debut album by Swedish heavy metal band Sonic Syndicate. It is their first and only album to be released through the American record label, Pivotal Rockordings. The album was recorded and mixed at Studiomega from February 2005 to June 2005 by Christian Silver and Manne Engström. The album was re-released on December 9, 2008, via Pivotal Rockordings/Koch in North America and Canada. Because of this, the album would sell over 10,000 copies by the end of 2010. It was also the last record by the band before parting ways with drummer Kristoffer Bäcklund and pianist Andreas Mårtensson.

== Album background ==
The album is made up of three different segments and each segment has a continuous theme/concept throughout its tracks. Two of those segments consist of the previous demos Black Lotus and Extinction. The songs from those demos were re-worked and re-recorded for this album. The other segment, "Helix Reign" consists of three new tracks.

== Track listing ==
All lyrics written by Richard Sjunnesson, all music written by Roger Sjunnesson, all music arranged by Sonic Syndicate.

"Helix Reign – Chronicles of a Broken Covenant"

1. "Jailbreak"– 4:12
2. "Enhance My Nightmare" – 5:10
3. "History Repeats Itself" – 3:52

"Extinction – A Sinwar Quadrilogy"

4. "Zion Must Fall" – 4:31
5. "Misanthropic Coil" – 3:53
6. "Lament of Innocence" – 3:43
7. "Prelude to Extinction" – 4:00

"Black Lotus – The Shadow Flora"

8. "Soulstone Splinter" – 4:18
9. "Crowned in Despair" – 4:33
10. "Where the Black Lotus Grows" – 4:47

== Personnel ==
Sonic Syndicate

- Richard Sjunnesson - unclean vocals
- Roger Sjunnesson - lead guitar
- Robin Sjunnesson - rhythm guitar
- Karin Axelsson – bass guitar (all tracks), clean vocals (tracks 2 and 9)
- Kristoffer Bäcklund - drums
- Andreas Mårtensson - keyboards

Additional musicians

- Roland Johansson - clean vocals (tracks 1, 2, 3, 6 and 7)
- Robert Sjunnesson - guitar solo (track 8)
- Manne Engström - guitars
- Christian Silver - guitars
- Linus Vikström - guitars
- Ulf Larsson - guitars
- Kaj Michelsson - guitars

Production

- Dragan Tanaskovic - producer/mixer
- Christian Silver - producer/mixer
- Johan Örnborg - assistant producer/mixer
- Jose A. Aranguren - artwork
