= List of Big Big Train band members =

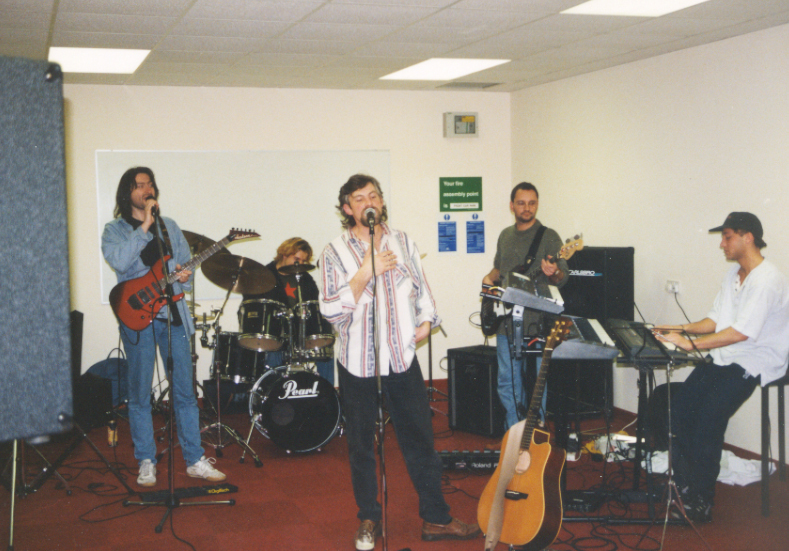
(left to right) Gregory Spawton, Steve Hughes, Martin Read, Andy Poole and Tony Müller

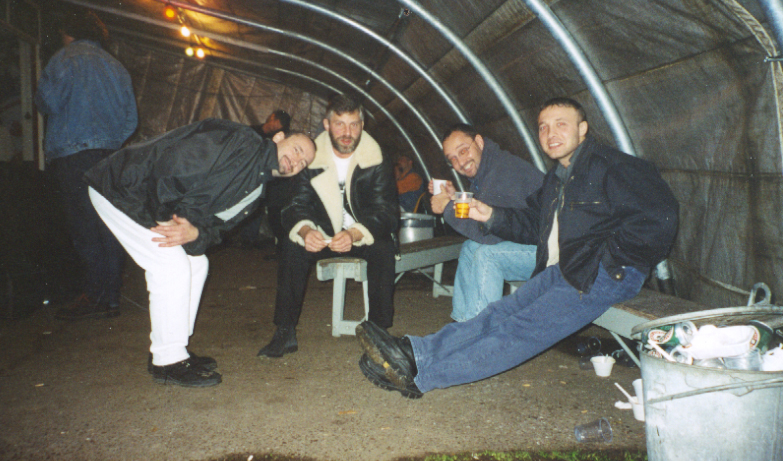
(left to right) Pete Hibbit, Martin Reed, Andy Poole and Tony Müller (Gregory Spawton not pictured)

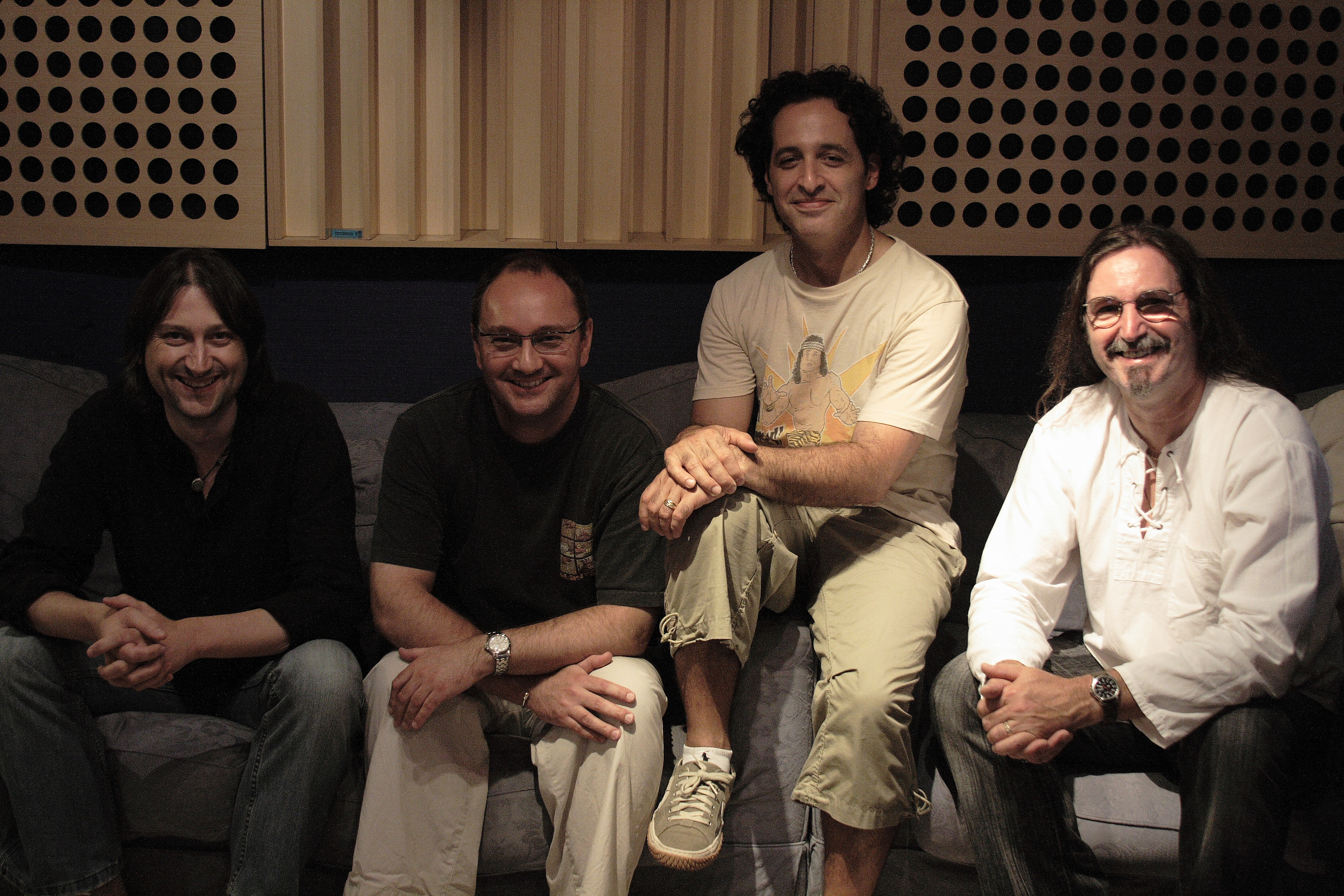
(left to right) Gregory Spawton, Andy Poole, Nick D'Virgilio and Sean Filkins

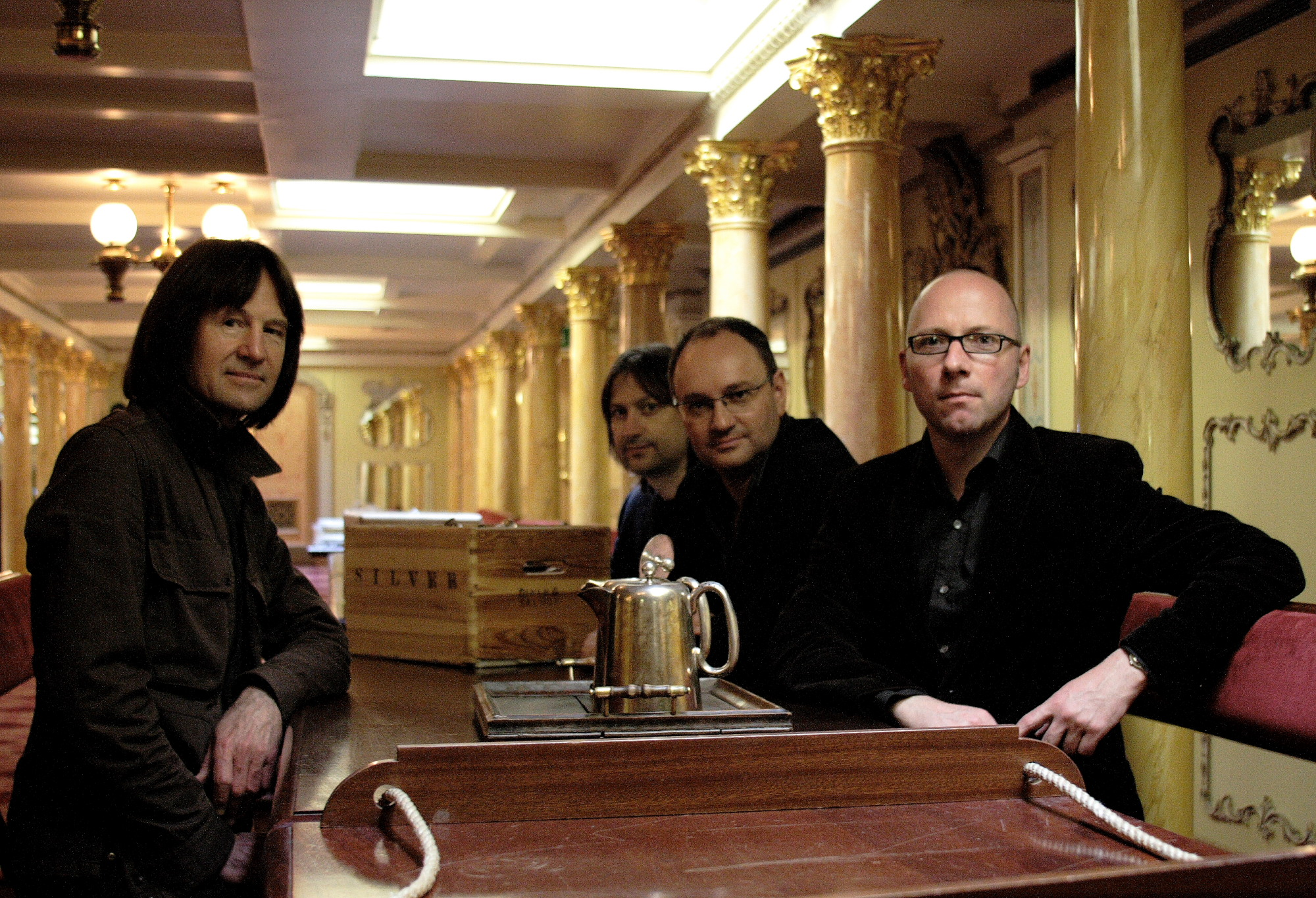
(left to right) Dave Gregory, Gregory Spawton, Andy Poole and David Longdon

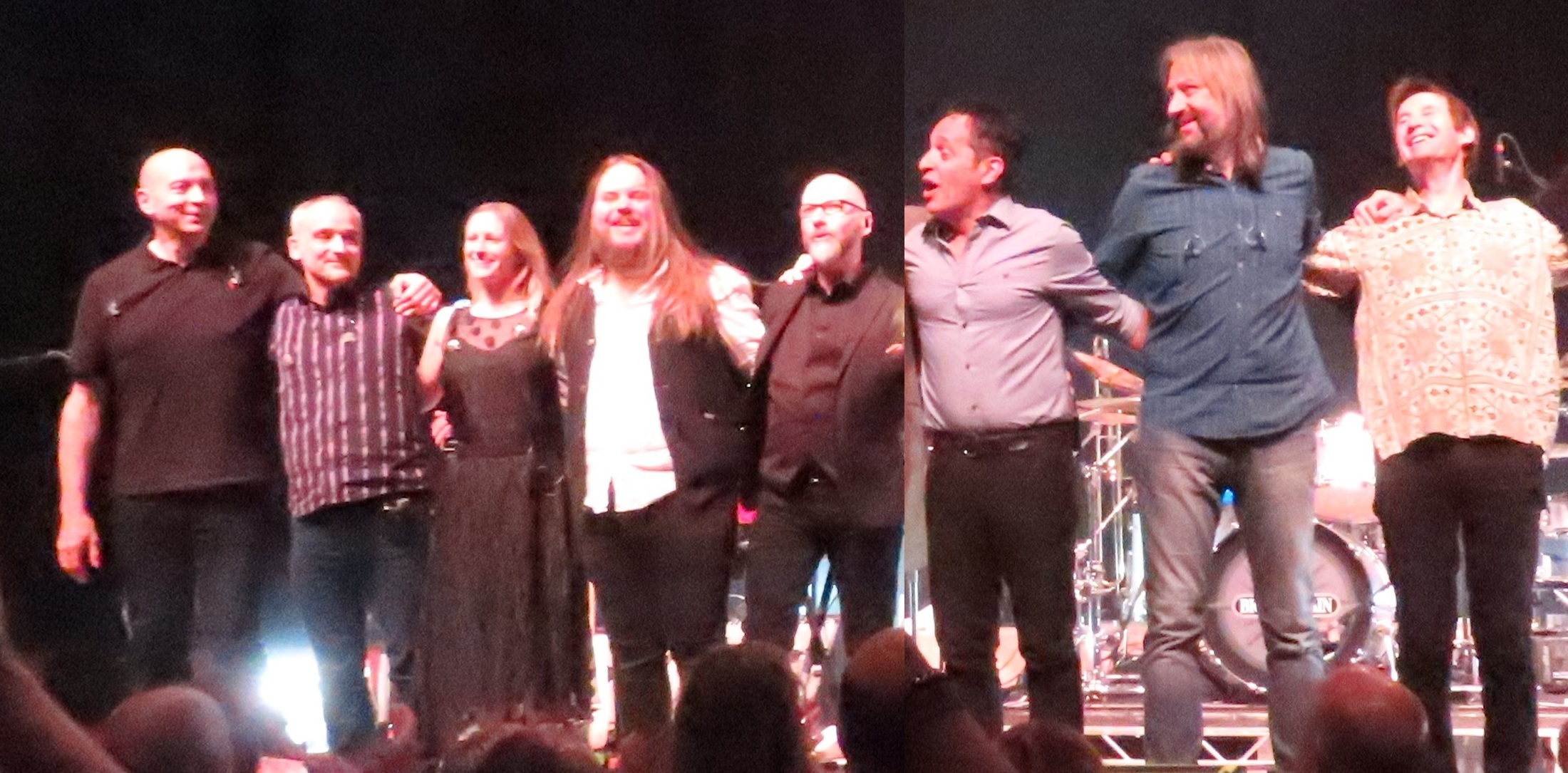
(left to right) Danny Manners, Robin Armstrong, Rachel Hall, Rikard Sjöblom, David Longdon, Nick D'Virgilio, Gregory Spawton and Dave Gregory

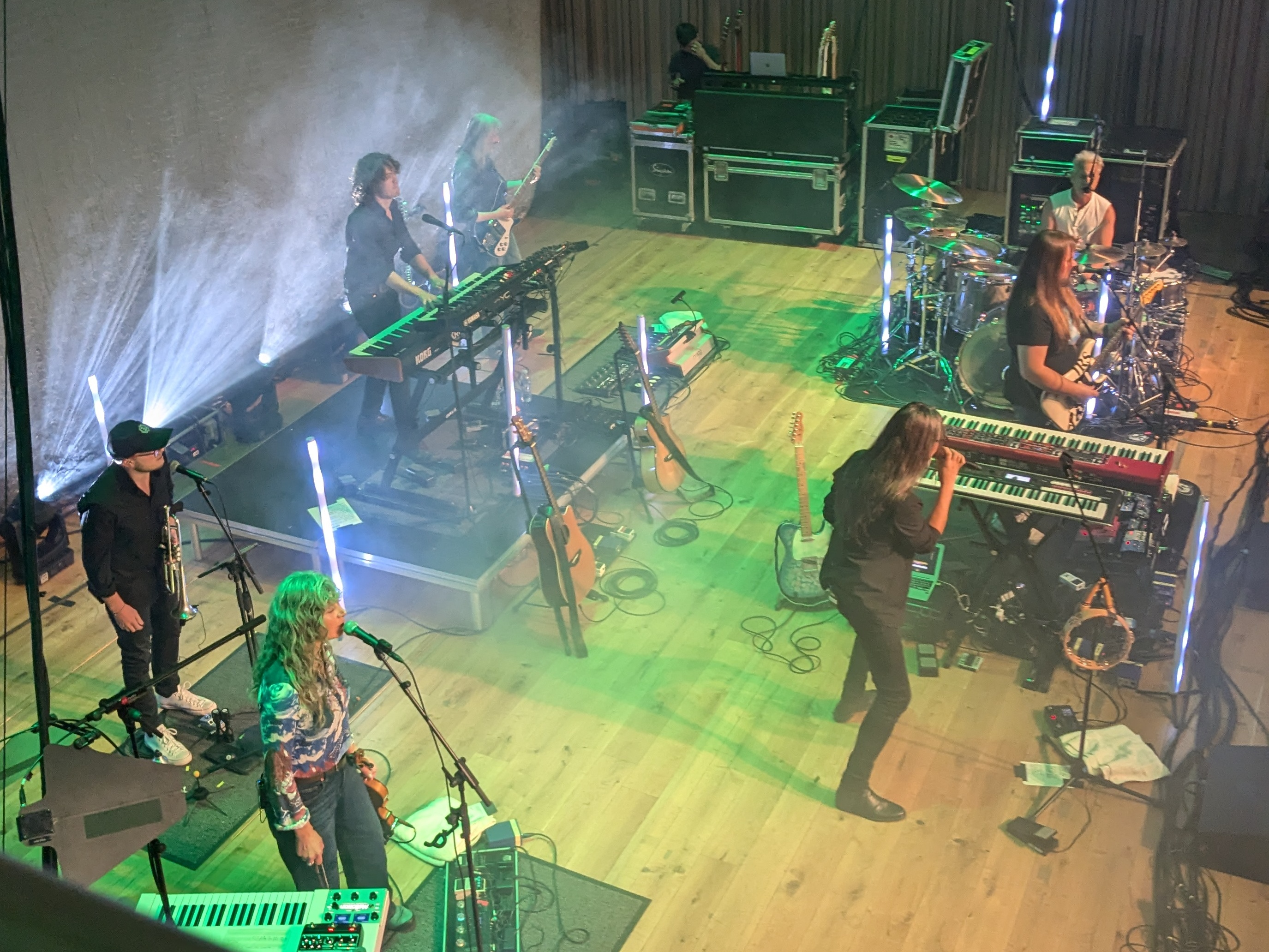
(left to right) Paul Mitchell, Clare Lindley, Oskar Holldorff, Gregory Spawton, Alberto Bravin, Rikard Sjöblom and Nick D'Virgilio (on drums)

Seven line-ups of Big Big Train in 1996, 1998, 2007, 2010, 2019 and 2024

Big Big Train is an English progressive rock band founded in 1990 by Gregory Spawton and Andy Poole. The band's first line-up included Spawton (guitar, keyboards) and Poole (bass), alongside vocalist Martin Read, keyboardist Ian Cooper and drummer Steve Hughes. The band's current line-up includes Spawton (bassist since 2009), drummer, guitarist and keyboardist Nick D'Virgilio (since 2009), guitarist and keyboardist Rikard Sjöblom (since 2014), violinist, keyboardist and guitarist Clare Lindley (since 2021), vocalist, keyboardist, guitarist and drummer Alberto Bravin (since 2022), keyboardist and vocalist Oskar Holldorff (since 2023) and trumpeter Paul Mitchell (since 2025).

== History ==
The roots of Big Big Train go back to 1981 in Birmingham, England, when Gregory's brother Nigel Spawton (drums) joined with Steve Lugg (guitar), Ed Serafinas (vocals of sorts) Pete McDonald (bass) and Tim McCarty (guitar) in a new wave outfit called Big Big Train, who were raw but brilliant. Later in the 80s Andy Poole formed a songwriting partnership in Bournemouth, England, with his childhood friend, Ian Cooper. At around the same time, Gregory Spawton had also formed his first band, Equus. Equus played a few local gigs around the Birmingham area before splitting up when Spawton went to university in 1984. Meanwhile, Poole and Cooper's band, Archshine, recorded a few demos and occasionally emerged from their home studio to play some gigs.

In 1987, Spawton moved down to Bournemouth. Shortly afterwards, he met Poole and they discovered that they shared a mutual appreciation of Genesis, Van der Graaf Generator and other progressive bands. In particular, they were both fans of a then relatively obscure band called IQ. Indeed, Poole had spent some time as a roadie for The Lens and IQ.

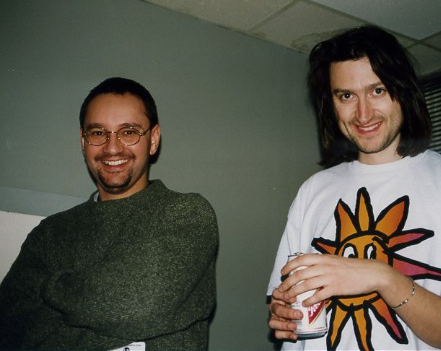
Andy Poole and Gregory Spawton founded the band in 1990.

In the late 1980s, they decided to record some demos together. After a few months, the very first Big Big Train songs emerged and in 1990, Archshine ceased to exist, and Big Big Train was founded, initially consisting of the trio of Spawton (guitar), Poole (bass) and Cooper (keyboards). The following year saw the recruitment of vocalist Maggie Wilson for a short period. A more stable line-up emerged by the end of the year with the addition of Martin Read (vocals).

The band's earliest songs were released in October 1991 on a demo tape called From the River to the Sea. During this time, now with drummer Steve Hughes, the band continued to perform live dates, gradually playing to larger crowds in higher profile venues.

In January 1993 the band released their second demo album, The Infant Hercules, and then followed up six months later with their debut full-length album, Goodbye to the Age of Steam. The response to the album was very positive, culminating in a licensing deal in Japan where the CD was re-released in 1995, with a bonus track. In the meantime, Ian Cooper had left the band (for family reasons) and due to this the band ceased touring and started looking for his replacement. They started work on their next album, with Spawton filling the role of keyboard player. Eventually, Tony Müller was recruited as keyboard player in early 1995 during the recording of the new album.

Some of the new songs were debuted live at The Astoria, London, the only live show the band performed during this period. English Boy Wonders was finally released in autumn 1997. Steve Hughes left the band in September 1998 and went on to join The Enid. He was replaced, briefly, by Pete Hibbit. After a few more live performances, the band's momentum was all but spent and Spawton and Poole retreated back to their studio to work on the next album. Events had turned full circle; Poole and Spawton, with no particular goal in mind and without a band line-up, slowly began work on some demos, more out of habit than anything else.

As the demos took shape, Gregory and Andy called in the other band members as and when they were required. In February 2002, after three years of irregular writing and recording, Bard was released. Bard received some excellent reviews. The line-up of the band during the recording of Bard consisted of Spawton, Poole, Read, Müller, the returning Cooper, and drummer Phil Hogg. Around the time of the album's release, The Enid became inactive, and Steve Hughes returned to Big Big Train to replace the departing Hogg.

In 2003, Müller and Read departed the band, and Sean Filkins was recruited to replace Read. This line-up recorded the band's next album, Gathering Speed, which was released in March 2004. This was the last album to feature Ian Cooper on keyboards; Poole and Spawton took the keyboards to play in future albums.

A new album titled The Difference Machine was released in September 2007. The album featured guest appearances from future full-time member Nick D'Virgilio, and Dave Meros (both of Spock's Beard), as well as Pete Trewavas of Marillion. In 2008, BBT appeared on the Classic Rock Magazine CD for issue 112, with the song Summer's Lease, which is also found on The Difference Machine.

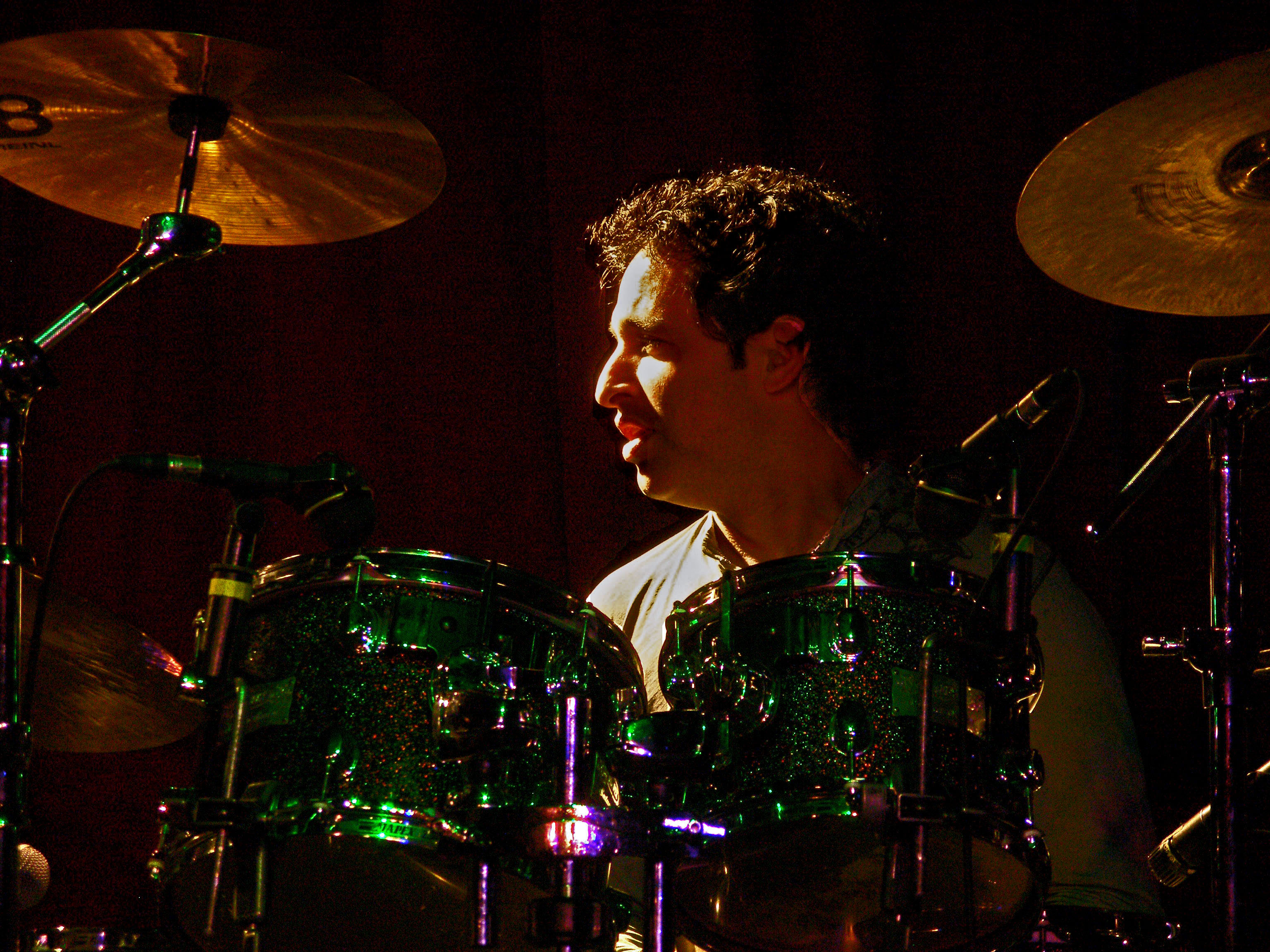
Then Spock's Beard's drummer, Nick D'Virgilio, contributed to The Difference Machine (2007) as a guest musician and later joined as a full-time member.

On BBT's blog, it was announced that they would be re-releasing English Boy Wonders. They partially re-recorded the album, as well as re-mixing it. English Boy Wonders was re-released on 1 December 2008. Both Hughes and Filkins left the band in February 2009, and were replaced by then-Spock's Beard drummer Nick D'Virgilio and vocalist and flute player David Longdon respectively.

BBT released their sixth studio album, The Underfall Yard, on 15 December 2009. Guitarist Dave Gregory (XTC), keyboardist Jem Godfrey (Frost*) and guitarist Francis Dunnery (It Bites) make guest appearances on The Underfall Yard. "Last Train" from The Underfall Yard was released on the iTunes essential compilation album Modern Prog on 10 February 2010.

In October 2010, the band released the 41-minute EP entitled Far Skies Deep Time. The EP again features guitarist Dave Gregory (formerly of XTC and now an established part of the band's line-up) as well as featuring performances from guest musicians keyboardist Martin Orford and bassist Danny Manners (frequent collaborator with Louis Philippe).

On 3 September 2012, the band released their seventh studio album, the first part of a double album, entitled English Electric Part One. The second part, English Electric Part Two, was released in March 2013, and featured Danny Manners (keyboards, double bass), who was now an official member of the band.

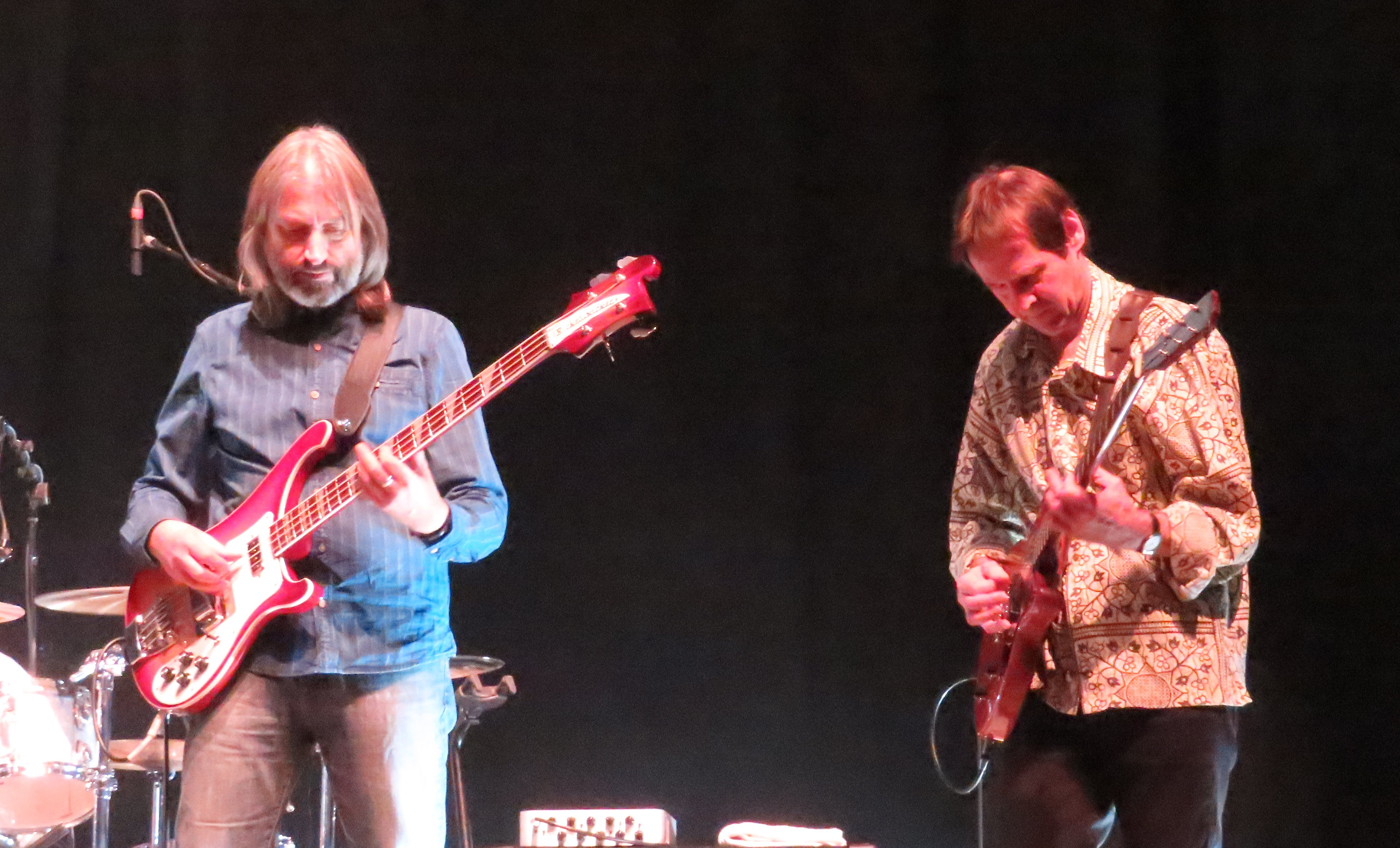
In 2015 the band returned to touring for the first time in 17 years, it featuring Gregory Spawton (left) on bass and Dave Gregory on guitars.

At the start of 2014 Beardfish frontman Rikard Sjöblom was confirmed as a touring keyboardist and guitarist. In August, the band convened at Real World Studios for a week to try out a live line-up that also included violinist Rachel Hall and a five-piece brass band under the directorship of trombonist Dave Desmond, who had featured on recent Big Big Train albums. The positive outcome led to the band announcing that its first live performances in seventeen years would take place in August 2015 at Kings Place in London, and that Sjöblom and Hall were now full band members for both live and studio work.

An EP containing new and live tracks, Wassail, was released on 1 June 2015, and Stone & Steel, a Blu-ray featuring rehearsals at Real World Studios as well as four of the songs performed at the Kings Place concerts, was released on 21 March 2016. The digital-only album From Stone and Steel, containing the Real World studio performances from August 2014, was released on 1 April 2016. Folklore was released on 27 May 2016 whilst its 'companion' album Grimspound was released on 28 April 2017.

Band co-founder Andy Poole departed the band early in January 2018, with guitarist and keyboardist Robin Armstrong joining the live line-up of the band the following month. Armstrong left the line-up at the end of 2019. Dave Gregory would announce his departure in March 2020 due to his desire to not tour internationally with Big Big Train. Randy McStine was subsequently named as his live replacement for scheduled shows in 2020, which were all subsequently cancelled due to the COVID-19 pandemic. Later in 2020, it was announced that Carly Bryant and Dave Foster would join the BBT live band.

Their thirteenth album, Common Ground, was released on 30 July 2021. On 21 October 2021, the band announced that their fourteenth studio album, Welcome to the Planet, would be released on 28 January 2022. Lead vocalist David Longdon died on 20 November 2021, aged 56. On 27 April 2022, Big Big Train announced former Premiata Forneria Marconi singer and keyboard player, Alberto Bravin, as their new lead vocalist. On 15 January 2023, it was announced that Carly Bryant was departing Big Big Train, to be replaced by Dim Gray's Oskar Holldorff.

Dave Foster left the band in June 2024 due to scheduling issues.

== Member information ==
=== Gregory Spawton ===
Gregory "Greg" Spawton (born 17 May 1965 (age 61)) is the co-founder, along with Andy Poole, of BBT, he plays bass (primary instrument since 2012) guitars, keyboards, bass pedals and backing vocals. He was brought up in Sutton Coldfield, and first got into progressive rock through his brother playing Genesis' Selling England by the Pound. He has been the band's main songwriter and leader for their career.

=== Andy Poole ===
Andy Poole was BBT's co-founder, he played bass with the band until 2012 when he moved onto additional keyboards and guitar. Though not as prolific a songwriter as Spawton, he still wrote some songs for the band. Poole departed the band in early 2018, saying "it has been a long old trip aboard this train and now the time is right for me to disembark: I am ready for new and exciting adventures."

Poole remains close friends with the band and works on band projects from time to time.

=== Nick D'Virgilio ===
Nick D'Virgilio (born 12 November 1968 (age 57)) has been BBT's drummer, vocalist and multi-instrumentalist since 2009, he originally recorded with the band as a guest musician in 2007. He left his former band Spock's Beard in 2011 and has also toured and recorded with other bands, including Genesis, Tears for Fears, Mystery and Mr. Big.

=== David Longdon ===
David Longdon (17 June 1965 – 20 November 2021 (aged 56)) was an English singer and multi-instrumentalist, he was lead singer, flautist and multi-instrumentalist for BBT from 2009 until his death in 2021. He played flute, keyboards, acoustic and electric 6 & 12 string guitars, bass, mandolin, lute, banjo, accordion, percussion, dulcimer, psaltry, vibraphone, theremin and glockenspiel.

=== Martin Read ===
Martin Read was BBT's original lead singer, he sang on albums Goodbye to the Age of Steam (1994), English Boy Wonders (1997) and Bard (2002). He was replaced by Sean Filkins.

=== Steve Hughes ===
Steve Hughes was BBT's original drummer, he had two tenures from 1991 to 1998 and from 2002 to 2009, during his gap in tenures, he was a member of The Enid. He has also released several solo albums, and been a member of John Mitchell's Kino.

=== Ian Cooper ===
Ian Cooper was the original keyboardist for BBT, he had two tenures from 1991 to 1995, and from 1999 to 2004 and was a childhood friend of Andy Poole. He played on albums Goodbye to the Age of Steam (1994), Bard (2002) and Gathering Speed (2004). Following his first departure, he was replaced by Tony Müller, when he rejoined in 1999 he played alongside Muller who moved to co-lead vocalist.

=== Tony Müller ===
Tony Müller replaced Cooper as BBT keyboardist, after Spawton filled in. Following Cooper rejoining Müller sang co lead vocals on Bard (2002).

=== Pete Hibbit ===
Pete Hibbit replaced Steve Hughes as drummer for BBT in 1998 though he was no longer in the band in 1999. He played some live shows with the band but did not record with them.

=== Phil Hogg ===
Phil Hogg was BBT's first long time drummer since the first departure of Steve Hughes, he replaced Hibbit in 1999. He recorded with the band on Bard (2002), before being replaced by the returning Hughes.

=== Sean Filkins ===
Sean Filkins replaced Read as BBT's lead vocalist before being replaced by David Longdon, he has also been associated with neo-prog band Lorien as well as UK space rock ensemble, Soma.

=== Dave Gregory ===
Dave Gregory (born 21 September 1952 (age 74)) joined BBT in 2009, having contributed to The Underfall Yard as a session guest, playing guitars, electric sitar, guitar solos, E-bow, Mellotron and sitar, Gregory had previously been a member of XTC. He departed from BBT in 2020 due to not wanting to tour internationally with the band.

=== Danny Manners ===
Danny Manners joined BBT in 2012 on keyboards and double bass, being the band first keyboardist since Ian Cooper's second departure in 2004. He had previously played double bass on Far Skies Deep Time (2010). He departed BBT in 2020, alongside violinist Rachel Hall.

=== Rikard Sjöblom ===
Rikard Sjöblom (born 23 February 1982 (age 44)) has been BBT's guitarist and keyboardist since 2014, he is also the frontman of Swedish prog rock band Beardfish.

=== Rachel Hall ===
Rachel Hall contributed violin, viola and cello, as well as vocals to BBT from 2014 to 2020, she is also a violin teacher in Norfolk. prior to joining BBT she played violin on albums English Electric Part One (2012), English Electric Part Two (2013), Make Some Noise (2013) and English Electric: Full Power (2013).

=== Dave Foster ===
Dave Foster January 1971 (age 55) joined the band as a replacement for Dave Gregory, after Randy McStine was originally announced as replacement. He has also been a member of Mr. So & So, Panic Room and the Steve Rothery Band.

=== Clare Lindley ===
Clare Lindley has been the band's violinist since 2021, replacing Rachel Hall, whom she also replaced in Stackridge, she also sings vocals. She also part of a Celtic duo with Brian Mullan, in which she sings and plays violin and guitar.

=== Carly Bryant ===
Carly Bryant was BBT's keyboardist after the departure of Danny Manners in 2020, she played keyboards and sang co-lead vocals on Common Ground (2021) and Welcome to the Planet (2022). She stepped away from touring in September 2022 due to "family commitments" and official left in January 2023.

=== Alberto Bravin ===
Alberto Bravin has been BBT's lead singer since 2022 following the death of David Longdon in 2021. He also plays guitars and keyboards, as Longdon previously had. Prior to joining the band he was a vocalist and keyboardist with Premiata Forneria Marconi, with whom he had played with for seven years.

=== Oskar Holldorff ===
Oskar Holldorff replaced Carly Bryant as the band's keyboardist in 2022, firstly on a touring basis and later full time following Bryant's departure. He is also a member of Dim Gray who have acted as support for BBT.

=== Paul Mitchell ===
Paul Mitchell is trumpet player, percussionist and backing vocalist. He started touring with BBT in 2024 when the band stopped touring with a brass ensemble, making his debut performance at Night Of The Prog in July.

== Members ==
=== Current ===
Image	Name	Years active	Instruments	Release contributions
	Gregory Spawton	1990–present	bass guitar (2009–present); backing vocals (1995–present); guitars; keyboards (1994–present)	all releases
	Nick D'Virgilio	2009–present (session guest 2007)	drums; vocals; percussion; guitars and keyboards (2018–present)	all releases from The Difference Machine (2007) onwards
	Rikard Sjöblom	2014–present	guitars; keyboards; backing vocals	all releases from Wassail (2015) onwards
	Clare Lindley	2021–present	violin; guitar; vocals; keyboards	all releases from Proper Jack Froster (2021) onwards
	Alberto Bravin	2022–present	lead vocals; guitars; keyboards; tambourine; drums	all releases from Ingenious Devices (2023) onwards
	Oskar Holldorff	2023–present (substitute 2022–2023)	keyboards; vocals	all releases from Ingenious Devices (2023) onwards
	Paul Mitchell	2025–present (touring 2024–2025)	trumpet; vocals; percussion; keyboards	all releases from Are We Nearly There Yet? (2025) onwards

=== Former ===
Image	Name	Years active	Instruments	Release contributions
	Ian Cooper	1990–1995; 1999–2004	keyboards	From the River to the Sea (1992); The Infant Hercules (1993); Goodbye to the Age of Steam (1994); Bard (2002); Gathering Speed (2004)
	Andy Poole	1990–2018	bass guitar (1990–2012); keyboards (1994–2018); guitars (2009–2018); backing vocals (1995–2018)	all release from From the River to the Sea (1991) to Merchants of Light (2018)
	Maggie Wilson	1991	lead vocals	none
	Martin Read	1991–2003	lead vocals; acoustic guitar	From the River to the Sea (1992); The Infant Hercules (1993); Goodbye to the Age of Steam (1994); English Boy Wonders (1997); Bard (2002)
	Steve Hughes	1991–1998; 2002–2009	drums	From the River to the Sea (1992); The Infant Hercules (1993); Goodbye to the Age of Steam (1994); English Boy Wonders (1997); Gathering Speed (2004); The Difference Machine (2007)
	Tony Müller	1995–2003 (session guest 2010)	keyboards; vocals (1999–2003)	English Boy Wonders (1997); Bard (2002); Far Skies Deep Time (2010)
	Pete Hibbit	1998–1999	drums; backing vocals	none
	Phil Hogg	1999–2002	drums	Bard (2002)
	Sean Filkins	2003–2009	lead vocals; blues harp; percussion	Gathering Speed (2004); The Difference Machine (2007)
	David Longdon	2009–2021 (until his death)	lead vocals; flute; keyboards; guitars; mandolin; banjo; tambourine	all releases from The Underfall Yard (2009) to Ingenious Devices (2023)
	Dave Gregory	2009–2020 (session guest 2009)	guitars; keyboards; banjo; occasional backing vocals	all releases from The Underfall Yard (2009) to Grand Tour (2019); Ingenious Devices (2023)
	Danny Manners	2012–2020 (session 2010)	keyboards; double bass; backing vocals	all releases Far Skies Deep Time (2010) to Grand Tour (2019); Ingenious Devices (2023)
	Rachel Hall	2014–2020 (session 2012)	violin; viola; cello; vocals	all releases from English Electric Part One (2012) to Grand Tour (2019); Ingenious Devices (2023)
	Dave Foster	2020–2023; 2024	guitars	all releases from Common Ground (2021) to The Likes Of Us (2024)
	Carly Bryant	2020–2023	keyboards; guitars; vocals	Common Ground (2021); Welcome to the Planet (2022)

=== Touring ===
Image	Name	Years active	Instruments	Release contributions
	Rich Evans	2014–2023; 2024	cornet	The Underfall Yard (2009); English Electric Part One (2012); English Electric Part Two (2013); Make Some Noise (2013); English Electric: Full Power (2013); Welcome to the Planet (2022); Ingenious Devices (2023)
	Dave Desmond	2014–2023; 2024	trombone	The Underfall Yard (2009); English Electric Part One (2012); English Electric Part Two (2013); Make Some Noise (2013); English Electric: Full Power (2013); Welcome to the Planet (2022); Ingenious Devices (2023)
	Nick Stones	2014–2023; 2024	French horn	The Underfall Yard (2009); English Electric Part One (2012); English Electric Part Two (2013); Make Some Noise (2013); English Electric: Full Power (2013); Welcome to the Planet (2022); Ingenious Devices (2023)
	Jon Truscott	2014–2023; 2024	tuba	The Underfall Yard (2009); English Electric Part One (2012); English Electric Part Two (2013); Make Some Noise (2013); English Electric: Full Power (2013); Welcome to the Planet (2022); Ingenious Devices (2023)
	Robin Armstrong	2018–2019	keyboards; guitars; backing vocals	Touring in place of the departed Andy Poole, appeared on live albums Empire (2020) and Summer Shall Not Fade (2022) and backing vocals on Make Some Noise (2013)
	Randy McStine	2020	guitars	McStine was to perform with the band following Dave Gregory's departure, although the shows were cancelled.
	Maria Barbieri	August–September 2023	guitars	Substitute for Dave Foster
	Cade Gotthardt	March 2024	trumpet; guitars; keyboards	In place of brass section for US dates.

=== Session ===
Image	Name	Years active	Instruments	Release contributions
	Rob Aubrey	1994–present	backing vocals; windchimes; production	all releases
	Ken Bundy	1994; 1997	backing vocals	Goodbye to the Age of Steam (1994); English Boy Wonders (1997)
	Martin Orford	1994; 1997; 2010; 2012	backing vocals; keyboards; flute	Goodbye to the Age of Steam (1994); English Boy Wonders (1997); Far Skies Deep Time (2010); English Electric Part One (2012); English Electric Part Two (2013)
	Gary Chandler	1994	backing vocals	Goodbye to the Age of Steam (1994)
	Sally French	1994	backing vocals	Goodbye to the Age of Steam (1994)
	Stuart Nicholson	1994	backing vocals	Goodbye to the Age of Steam (1994)
	Mandy Taylor	1994	backing vocals	Goodbye to the Age of Steam (1994)
	Steve Christey	1994	windchimes	Goodbye to the Age of Steam (1994)
	Jo Michaels	2002	vocals	Bard (2002)
	Laura Murch	2004	vocals	Gathering Speed (2004)
	Becca King	2007	viola	The Difference Machine (2007)
	Tony Wright	2007	alto saxophone; tenor saxophone; flute	The Difference Machine (2007)
	Dave Meros	2007	bass	The Difference Machine (2007)
	Pete Trewavas	2007	bass	The Difference Machine (2007)
	Jon Foyle	2009	electric cello; cello	The Underfall Yard (2009)
	Francis Dunnery	2009	guitars and guitar solo	The Underfall Yard (2009)
	Jem Godfrey	2009	synthesizer solos	The Underfall Yard (2009)
	Jonathan Barry	2010	guitar solo	Far Skies Deep Time (2010)
	Andy Tillison	2012	organ; Moog; keyboards	English Electric Part One (2012); English Electric Part Two (2013); English Electric: Full Power (2013)
	Ben Godfrey	2012; 2022	cornet; trumpet; piccolo trumpet	English Electric Part One (2012); English Electric Part Two (2013); Make Some Noise (2013); English Electric: Full Power (2013); Welcome to the Planet (2022)
	Abigail Trundle	2012	cello	English Electric Part One (2012); English Electric Part Two (2013); Make Some Noise (2013); English Electric: Full Power (2013)
	Daniel Steinhardt	2012	electric guitar	English Electric Part One (2012); English Electric Part Two (2013); Make Some Noise (2013); English Electric: Full Power (2013)
	Eleanor Gilchrist	2012	violin	English Electric Part One (2012); English Electric Part Two (2013); Make Some Noise (2013); English Electric: Full Power (2013)
	Geraldine Berreen	2012	violin	English Electric Part One (2012); English Electric Part Two (2013); Make Some Noise (2013); English Electric: Full Power (2013)
	Sue Bowran	2012	violin	English Electric Part One (2012); English Electric Part Two (2013); Make Some Noise (2013); English Electric: Full Power (2013)
	Teresa Whipple	2012	viola	English Electric Part One (2012); English Electric Part Two (2013); Make Some Noise (2013); English Electric: Full Power (2013)
	Jan Jaap Langereis	2012	recorders	English Electric Part One (2012); English Electric Part Two (2013); Make Some Noise (2013); English Electric: Full Power (2013)
	Lily Adams	2012	backing vocals	English Electric Part One (2012); English Electric Part Two (2013); Make Some Noise (2013); English Electric: Full Power (2013)
	Verity Joy	2012	backing vocals	English Electric Part One (2012); English Electric Part Two (2013); Make Some Noise (2013); English Electric: Full Power (2013)
	Violet Adams	2012	backing vocals	English Electric Part One (2012); English Electric Part Two (2013); Make Some Noise (2013); English Electric: Full Power (2013)
	Judy Dyble	2017 (died 2020)	vocals	Grimspound (2017)
	Philip Trzebiatowski	2017	cello	Grimspound (2017)
	Aidan O'Rourke	2021; 2022	violin; soundscapes	Common Ground (2021); Welcome to the Planet (2022)
	Derek Reeves	2022	violin	Welcome to the Planet (2022)
	Riaan Vosloo	2022	double bass	Welcome to the Planet (2022)
	Brian Mullan	2023	cello	The Likes of Us (2024)

== Line-ups ==
Period	Members	Releases
1990 – 1991	Gregory Spawton – guitar; Andy Poole – bass; Ian Cooper – keyboards	
1991	Gregory Spawton – guitar; Andy Poole – bass; Ian Cooper – keyboards; Maggie Wilson - vocals	
1991 – 1995	Gregory Spawton – guitar, keyboards; Andy Poole – bass; Ian Cooper – keyboards; Steve Hughes – drums; Martin Read – vocals	From the River to the Sea (1992); The Infant Hercules (1993); Goodbye to the Age of Steam (1994)
1995	Gregory Spawton – guitar, keyboards, backing vocals; Andy Poole – bass, backing vocals; Steve Hughes – drums; Martin Read – vocals	
1995 – September 1998	Gregory Spawton – guitar, keyboards, backing vocals; Andy Poole – bass, backing vocals; Steve Hughes – drums; Martin Read – vocals; Tony Müller – keyboards	English Boy Wonders (1997)
September 1998 – 1999	Gregory Spawton – guitar, keyboards, backing vocals; Andy Poole – bass, backing vocals; Martin Read – vocals; Tony Müller – keyboards; Pete Hibbit – drums, backing vocals	
1999	Gregory Spawton – guitar, keyboards, backing vocals; Andy Poole – bass, backing vocals; Martin Read – vocals; Tony Müller – keyboards, vocals; Phil Hogg – drums	
1999 – 2002	Gregory Spawton – guitar, keyboards, backing vocals; Andy Poole – bass, backing vocals; Martin Read – vocals; Tony Müller – keyboards, vocals; Phil Hogg – drums; Ian Cooper – keyboards	Bard (2002)
2002 – 2003	Gregory Spawton – guitar, keyboards, backing vocals; Andy Poole – bass, backing vocals; Martin Read – vocals; Tony Müller – keyboards, vocals; Ian Cooper – keyboards; Steve Hughes – drums	
2003 – 2004	Gregory Spawton – guitar, keyboards, backing vocals; Andy Poole – bass; Ian Cooper – keyboards; Steve Hughes – drums; Sean Filkins – vocals	Gathering Speed (2004)
2004 – 2009	Gregory Spawton – guitar, keyboards, backing vocals; Andy Poole – bass; Steve Hughes – drums; Sean Filkins – vocals	The Difference Machine (2007)
2009 – 2012	Gregory Spawton – keyboards, guitar, bass; Andy Poole – bass, keyboards, guitar; David Longdon – vocals, flute, keyboards, guitar; Nick D'Virgilio – drums, backing vocals; Dave Gregory – guitar (Initially session)	The Underfall Yard (2009); Far Skies Deep Time (2010)
2012 – 2014	Gregory Spawton – bass, guitar, keyboards, backing vocals; Andy Poole – keyboards, guitar, backing vocals; David Longdon – vocals, flute, keyboards, guitar; Nick D'Virgilio – drums, backing vocals; Dave Gregory – guitar; Danny Manners – keyboards, double bass	English Electric Part One (2012); English Electric Part Two (2013); Make Some Noise (2013); English Electric: Full Power (2013)
2014 – 2018	Gregory Spawton – bass, guitar, keyboards, backing vocals; Andy Poole – keyboards, guitar, backing vocals; David Longdon – vocals, flute, keyboards, guitar; Nick D'Virgilio – drums, vocals; Dave Gregory – guitar; Danny Manners – keyboards, double bass; Rikard Sjöblom – guitar, keyboards, backing vocals; Rachel Hall – violin, vocals	Wassail (2015); Folklore (2016); A Stone's Throw from the Line (2016); Stone & Steel (2016); Grimspound (2017); The Second Brightest Star (2017); 'Merry Christmas' (2017); Reflectors of Light (2019)
2018-July 2020	Gregory Spawton – bass, guitar, keyboards, backing vocals; David Longdon – vocals, flute, keyboards, guitar; Nick D'Virgilio – drums, vocals, keyboards, guitar; Dave Gregory – guitar (left in April 2020); Danny Manners – keyboards, double bass (left in July 2020); Rikard Sjöblom – guitar, keyboards, backing vocals; Rachel Hall – violin, vocals (left in March 2020); Robin Armstrong – guitar, keyboards, backing vocals (touring)	Grand Tour (2019); Empire (2020); Summer Shall Not Fade (2022); Ingenious Devices (2023)
July–November 2020	Gregory Spawton – bass, guitar, keyboards, backing vocals; David Longdon – vocals, flute, keyboards, guitar; Nick D'Virgilio – drums, vocals, keyboards, guitar; Rikard Sjöblom – guitar, keyboards, backing vocals	
November 2020-November 2021	Gregory Spawton – bass, guitar, keyboards, backing vocals; David Longdon – vocals, flute, keyboards, guitar; Nick D'Virgilio – drums, vocals, keyboards, guitar; Rikard Sjöblom – guitar, keyboards, backing vocals; Dave Foster – guitar; Carly Bryant – keyboards, guitar, vocals; Claire Lindley – violin, vocals	Common Ground (2021); Welcome to the Planet (2022)
April 2022-January 2023	Gregory Spawton – bass, guitar, keyboards, backing vocals; Nick D'Virgilio – drums, vocals, keyboards, guitar; Rikard Sjöblom – guitar, keyboards, backing vocals; Dave Foster – guitar; Carly Bryant – keyboards, guitar, vocals (did not perform at live dates; Oskar Holldorff substituted); Claire Lindley – violin, vocals; Alberto Bravin – vocals, guitar, keyboards	Ingenious Devices (2023) one track
January 2023-July 2024	Gregory Spawton – bass, guitar, keyboards, backing vocals; Nick D'Virgilio – drums, vocals, keyboards, guitar; Rikard Sjöblom – guitar, keyboards, backing vocals; Dave Foster – guitar; Claire Lindley – violin, vocals; Alberto Bravin – vocals, guitar, keyboards; Oskar Holldorff – keyboards, vocals; Maria Barbieri – guitar (substitute)	The Likes of Us (2024)
July 2024 – July 2025	Gregory Spawton – bass, guitar, keyboards, backing vocals; Nick D'Virgilio – drums, vocals, keyboards, guitar; Rikard Sjöblom – guitar, keyboards, backing vocals; Claire Lindley – violin, guitar, vocals, keyboards; Alberto Bravin – vocals, guitar, keyboards, drums; Oskar Holldorff – keyboards, vocals	
July 2025 onwards	Gregory Spawton – bass, guitar, keyboards, backing vocals; Nick D'Virgilio – drums, vocals, keyboards, guitar; Rikard Sjöblom – guitar, keyboards, backing vocals; Claire Lindley – violin, guitar, vocals, keyboards; Alberto Bravin – vocals, guitar, keyboards, drums; Oskar Holldorff – keyboards, vocals; Paul Mitchell - trumpet, vocals, percussion	
