= Big Big Train discography =

English musical discography

- Studio albums: 15
- Extended plays: 6
- Live albums: 7
- Compilation albums: 2
- Video albums: 4
- Demo albums: 2

This is the discography of the English progressive rock band, Big Big Train.

== Studio albums ==
Year	Album
1994	Goodbye to the Age of Steam (Note: Remasted/Reissued with expanded track list/new artwork: 2011)
1997	English Boy Wonders (Note: Partially Re-recorded/Remixed/Reissued: 2008)
2002	Bard
2004	Gathering Speed (Note: Remastered/Reissued with additional artwork/lyrics: 2009)
2007	The Difference Machine (Note: Reissued with additional track: 2010)
2009	The Underfall Yard (Note: Reissued: 2011)
2012	English Electric Part One
2013	English Electric Part Two
2016	Folklore
2017	Grimspound
2017	The Second Brightest Star
2019	Grand Tour
2021	Common Ground
2022	Welcome to the Planet
2024	The Likes of Us
2026	Woodcut

== Live albums ==
Year	Album
2016	From Stone and Steel (Live from Real World Studios 2014)
2016	A Stone's Throw from the Line (Live from King's Place 2015)
2018	Merchants of Light
2020	Empire
2022	Summer Shall Not Fade
2024	A Flare On The Lens
2025	Are We Nearly There Yet? Live Around The World

== Compilation albums ==
Year	Album
2013	English Electric: Full Power (Note: Combines Part One and Part Two with additional tracks.)
2020	Summer's Lease
2023	Ingenious Devices

== Video releases ==
Year	Title
2016	Stone & Steel
2019	Reflectors of Light
2020	Empire
2022	Summer Shall Not Fade
2024	A Flare On The Lens

== Demo albums and EPs ==
Year	Title
1991	From the River to the Sea
1993	The Infant Hercules
2010	Far Skies Deep Time (Note: Reissued with alternate track listing: 2011)
2013	Make Some Noise (Note: Includes the additional tracks from English Electric Full Power)
2015	Wassail
2017	London Song
2017	Merry Christmas
2018	Swan Hunter
2025	Scop
