= Ingenious Devices =

Studio album by Big Big Train
- Released: 30 June 2023
- Recorded: 2018–2020, September 2022
- Studio: Abbey Road, London (strings); Friars Aylesbury, Buckinghamshire (live track)
- Genre: Progressive rock
- Length: 60:03

Big Big Train chronology
Welcome to the Planet (2022)	Ingenious Devices (2023)	The Likes of Us (2024)

Ingenious Devices is a compilation album by English progressive rock band Big Big Train, released on 30 June 2023. It includes four studio tracks that were recorded in 2019 and one live track that was recorded in September 2022. Three tracks are re-recordings, except for the vocals of the late David Longdon.

== Background ==
The album includes a 17-piece string section that was recorded at Abbey Road Studios in 2018; this is featured on all of the studio tracks. These strings were recorded for the track "Voyager", from the album Grand Tour, though when it was recorded, they also recorded strings for "East Coast Racer", from English Electric Part Two. Strings were also recorded in 2020 for the upgraded version of the track "Brooklands", which was from the Folklore album.

The plan for these songs was to completely re-record them, but the death of lead singer David Longdon meant that the vocals from the original recordings would have to be used. On the decision to re-record the songs, founder and bassist Gregory Spawton said "I was always happy with the original recorded version of 'East Coast Racer', but adding the strings at Abbey Road gave the song a further lift and the new recording also features Dave Gregory's guitar solo on the closing section, a solo which has only previously featured on live performances of the song. I am pleased we now have the definitive studio version on Ingenious Devices. By contrast, I was never entirely satisfied with 'Brooklands' and felt it got a bit overlooked on the Folklore album, which is perhaps why we've not played the song live yet. The Abbey Road strings have significantly enhanced the song and I'm delighted with the outcome. The changes to 'Voyager' are more subtle but still elevate the song beyond the version on our Grand Tour album."

The other two tracks are an orchestral piece called "The Book of Ingenious Devices", and a live version of the song "Atlantic Cable", from the album Common Ground, which was recorded at Friars Aylesbury, Buckinghamshire in September 2022.

Differences from the original versions of the songs include an extended outro section to "East Coast Racer", which was written by then keyboardist Danny Manners for live shows with a guitar solo from then guitarist Dave Gregory. This song was completely re-recorded by the 2019 line-up. "Brooklands" includes newly recorded drums, bass and bass pedals, and "Voyager" includes additional guitar and violin.

== Track listing ==
All music is composed by Gregory Spawton (except for the closing section of "East Coast Racer").

Ingenious Devices track listing
No.	Title	Music	Original album	Length
1.	"East Coast Racer"	Gregory Spawton and Danny Manners (Closing Section)	English Electric Part Two	15:52
2.	"The Book of Ingenious Devices"			1:23
3.	"Brooklands"		Folklore	12:29
4.	"Voyager"		Grand Tour	14:10
5.	"Atlantic Cable" (live)		Common Ground	15:24

== Personnel ==
"East Coast Racer", "Brooklands" and "Voyager"

- Nick D'Virgilio – drums, percussion, vocals
- Dave Gregory – guitars
- Rachel Hall – violin, vocals
- David Longdon – vocals, flute
- Danny Manners – piano, keyboards
- Rikard Sjoblom – guitars, vocals
- Gregory Spawton – bass, bass pedals

with

- Dave Desmond – trombone, brass arrangements
- Ben Godfrey – trumpet and cornet
- Nick Stones – French horn
- John Storey – euphonium
- Jon Truscott – tuba

and the Abbey Road string section (conducted by Rick Wentworth and James Shearman, string arrangements by John Hinchey, Dave Gregory, Danny Manners and Rachel Hall)

"Atlantic Cable"

- Alberto Bravin – vocals, keyboards
- Nick D'Virgilio – drums, vocals
- Dave Foster – guitars
- Oskar Holldorff – keyboards, vocals
- Clare Lindley – violin, vocals
- Rikard Sjoblom – guitars, keyboards, vocals
- Gregory Spawton – bass, bass pedals

== Charts ==
Chart performance for Ingenious Devices
Chart (2023)	Peak position
Scottish Albums (OCC)	19
UK Independent Albums (OCC)	11
