= The Likes of Us (Big Big Train album) =

Studio album by Big Big Train
- Released: 1 March 2024
- Recorded: May–June 2023
- Studio: Urban (Trieste); Aubitt (Southampton); Inner State (Bath)
- Genre: Progressive rock
- Length: 64:17
- Label: Inside Out
- Producer: Big Big Train

Big Big Train chronology
Ingenious Devices (2023)	The Likes of Us (2024)

The Likes of Us is the fifteenth studio album by English progressive rock band Big Big Train, released on 1 March 2024. It is the band's first album of new material with singer Alberto Bravin and keyboardist Oskar Holldorff who joined in 2022 and 2023 respectively, as well as the first album since The Difference Machine without singer David Longdon, who died in 2021. It is their first album to be released on progressive label InsideOut Music, which the band signed to in July 2023, having self released several of their albums before. The album was also released in Japan, featuring a Japanese language version of "Love Is The Light".

== Track listing ==
The Likes of Us track listing
No.	Title	Lyrics	Music	Length
1.	"Light Left in the Day"	Gregory Spawton	Alberto Bravin; Spawton	6:10
2.	"Oblivion"	Nick D'Virgilio	D'Virgilio; Dave Foster	5:27
3.	"Beneath the Masts": "On the Bank"; "Homeground"; "On the Mast"; "The Devil's Dressing Room"; "On the Hillside"	Spawton	Bravin; D'Virgilio; Spawton	17:26
4.	"Skates On"	Spawton	Spawton	4:28
5.	"Miramare": "Novara"; "Bora Chiara"; "Bora Scura"	Bravin; Spawton	Bravin	10:17
6.	"Love Is the Light"	Bravin; Spawton	Bravin; Daniele Dibaggio	6:11
7.	"Bookmarks"	Spawton	Bravin; Spawton	6:23
8.	"Last Eleven"	Spawton	Spawton	7:55
Total length:				64:17

Streaming version bonus track
No.	Title	Lyrics	Music	Length
9.	"Miramare" (Single Edit)	Bravin; Spawton	Bravin	8:55
Total length:				73:16

== Personnel ==
Big Big Train

- Alberto Bravin – lead vocals, piano, organ, keyboards, guitars, 12-string guitars, production, mixing (all tracks); brass arrangement (tracks 1, 5, 6)
- Nick D'Virgilio – drums, percussion, 12-string acoustic guitar, vibraphone, vocals, production (all tracks); brass arrangement (track 3)
- Dave Foster – guitars, 12-string guitars, vocals, production
- Oskar Holldorff – piano, organ, synthesizers, keyboards, vocals, production (all tracks); string arrangement (track 7)
- Clare Lindley – violin, vocals, production (all tracks); string arrangement (track 5)
- Rikard Sjöblom – guitars, 12-string guitars, organ, keyboards, vocals, production
- Gregory Spawton – bass guitar, bass pedals, 12-string acoustic guitar, Mellotron, production

Big Big Train Brass Ensemble

- Dave Desmond – brass arrangement, trombone (tracks 1, 3, 5, 6)
- Ben Godfrey – trumpet, piccolo trumpet (tracks 1, 3, 5, 6)
- Nick Stones – French horn (tracks 1, 3, 5, 6)
- Jon Truscott – tuba (tracks 1, 3, 5, 6)

Additional contributors

- Rob Aubrey – engineering, mixing, mastering
- Sarah Louise Ewing – original cover, gatefold artwork
- Massimo Goina – photography
- David Lord – engineering
- Brian Mullan – cello
- Bruce Soord – 5.1 and Dolby Atmos mixing
- Steve Vantsis – design, layout
- Fulvio Zafret – engineering

== Charts ==
Chart performance for The Likes of Us
Chart (2024)	Peak position
Australian Digital Albums (ARIA)	24
Scottish Albums (OCC)	8
Swiss Albums (Schweizer Hitparade)	82
UK Albums (OCC)	63
UK Rock & Metal Albums (OCC)	2
