= Powder monkey (disambiguation) =

Powder monkeys was the nickname given to boys and young men during the Age of Sail that carried bags of gunpowder from the powder magazine in the ship's hold to the gun crews. It may also refer to:

- Powder Monkey, a 1973 novel by Kenneth Bulmer as Adam Hardy
- Powder Monkey, a 2006 novel by Paul Dowswell and set in the British Navy of 1800
- The Powder Monkey, a 1906 novel by George Manville Fenn
- From Powder Monkey to Admiral, written by William Henry Giles Kingston, first published in 1879 and reprinted as recently as 2007
- Powder Monkeys, an Australian punk band (1991–2002)
- Powder Monkey, a song by the UK progressive rock band Big Big Train from their 2004 album Gathering Speed
