= Far Skies Deep Time =

EP by Big Big Train
- Released: 2010/2011
- Studio: English Electric Studios
- Genre: Progressive rock, new prog
- Length: 40:47; 43:44
- Label: English Electric
- Producer: Andy Poole

Big Big Train chronology
The Underfall Yard (2009)	Far Skies Deep Time (2010)	English Electric Part One (2012)

Far Skies Deep Time is the first official studio EP by the English progressive rock band Big Big Train. It was released in 2010 by English Electric Recordings, and re-released in 2011 with "Kingmaker" replacing "Master of Time" as the first track. It contains five tracks, including a 17-minute epic about the last voyage of Belgian singer Jacques Brel.

== Track listing ==
1. "Master of Time" (Anthony Phillips) - 7:44 / "Kingmaker" (Greg Spawton) - 10:31 *
2. "Fat Billy Shouts Mine" (Spawton) - 6:34
3. "British Racing Green" (David Longdon/Spawton) - 3:59
4. "Brambling" (Longdon/Spawton) - 5:00
5. "The Wide Open Sea" (Longdon/Spawton) - 17:44

* The original version of the EP features "Master of Time", a cover of an Anthony Phillips song demoed for the 1977 album The Geese and the Ghost. The import and download version features "Kingmaker" as an alternative track to "Master of Time".

== Personnel ==
- David Longdon – lead vocals, flute, accordion, mandolin, banjo, vibraphone, keyboards, glockenspiel, percussion, theremin
- Dave Gregory – 6- and 12-string electric guitars, e-bow
- Gregory Spawton – keyboards, 6- and 12-string electric and acoustic guitars, bass guitar
- Andy Poole – bass guitar, bass pedals, keyboards
- Nick D'Virgilio – drums, backing vocals, percussion

Guest musicians

- Jonathan Barry – guitar solo (2)
- Danny Manners – double bass (3)
- Tony Müller – piano (3)
- Martin Orford – keyboard solos (2)
- Jim Trainer – artwork, seagulls
- Rob Aubrey – mixing and mastering at Aubitt Studios
