= Jadis (band) =

British neo-prog band

- Origin: Southampton, England
- Genres: Progressive rock
- Years active: 1982–present
- Labels: InsideOut Music, Giant Electric Pea, Jadismusic
- Members: Gary Chandler; Steve Christey; Andy Marlow; Martin Orford
- Past members: Trevor Dawkins (1982–1989); Les Marshall (1982–1986); Mark Ridout (1982–1985); Paul Alwin (1985–1988); Pete Salmon (1986–1989); Mark Law (1988–1989); John Jowitt; Giulio Risi
- Website: www.jadismusic.com

Jadis are a British neo-prog group. They play guitar-driven rock with the use of synthesisers to add depth and atmosphere, and an emphasis on melody. They were previously signed to InsideOut Music.

The name Jadis is taken from the novel The Magician's Nephew by C. S. Lewis. The same character appears as the White Witch in The Lion, The Witch and the Wardrobe

== History ==
Jadis were formed in 1982 and in 1987 self-released the cassette Jadis, which was produced by Marillion's Steve Rothery. In 1992, More Than Meets the Eye was released and was received well in the progressive rock scene.

Jadis are led by Gary Chandler (vocals, electric guitar), although generally the whole group are given songwriting credit. Other original members of the band were Trevor Dawkins (bass), Pete Salmon (keyboards) and Paul Alwin (drums), who was replaced by Mark Law in July 1988. Later members were Martin Orford (keyboards), John Jowitt (bass) and Steve Christey (drums). Orford and Jowitt were also members of IQ during that time.

In the late 1990s, Orford and Jowitt left the band for a while and were replaced by Mike Torr (keyboards) and Steve Hunt (bass), but they returned for 2000's Understand. After completing their album Photoplay in 2006, Orford left the band for a second time because he retired from the music industry. He was replaced with Italian session pianist/keyboardist Giulio Risi but has since rejoined. The same year, Jowitt also left the band again, and was replaced with session player Andy Marlow. The band released the album See Right Through You in 2012, followed by No Fear of Looking Down in 2016. After two compilations the album More Questions Than Anwers was released in 2024.

The band are based in Southampton.

== Discography ==
=== Studio albums ===
- Jadis (LP, 1989)
- More Than Meets the Eye (1992), (2005) Special Edition, (2017) 25th Anniversary, Edition 2cd
- Across the Water (1994), (2026) Expanded 2cd
- Somersault (1997)
- Understand (2000)
- Fanatic (2003)
- Photoplay (2006)
- See Right Through You (2012)
- No Fear of Looking Down (2016)
- More Questions Than Answers (2024)

=== EPs ===
- Once Upon a Time (1993)
- No Sacrifice (1994)
- Once or Twice (1996)
- Racing Sideways (Promotional CD to support the "Understand" Album) (2000)
- The Great Outside (Promotional CD to support the "Fanatic" Album) (2003)

=== Live and compilation albums ===
- As Daylight Fades (1998) (live)
- Medium Rare (2001) (compilation of two earlier EPs, Once Upon a Time and Once or Twice, plus some additional tracks)
- Alive Outside (2001) (live)
- Starting Point (2017)
- Medium Rare II (2019)
- Live Snapshot (2025)

=== Videos/DVD ===
- View From Above (2003)
