= Merchants of Light =

Live album by Big Big Train
- Released: 27 July 2018
- Recorded: 29, 30 September and 1 October 2017
- Venue: Cadogan Hall, London
- Genre: Progressive rock, new prog
- Label: English Electric
- Producer: Big Big Train

Big Big Train chronology
A Stone's Throw from the Line (2016)	Merchants of Light (2018)

Merchants of Light is the second live offering by Big Big Train and is based on the autumn 2017 Concerts at Cadogan Hall, London. It was recorded across three dates 29, 30 September and 1 October 2017, then first released on 27 July 2018.

The setlist is made up of 16 tracks and these are drawn from the latest four albums of the band, The Underfall Yard, English Electric, Folklore and Grimspound. The release of the 2 CD album was preceded by a single of the track "Swan Hunter" a few days before the full live album.

== Reaction ==
The three scheduled shows sold out. A review states that the shows and recording were "full of brilliant photos, a perfect setlist and spectacular sound."

== Track listing ==
Disc one

No.	Title	Writer(s)	Length
1.	"Folklore Overture"	Manners / Longdon	02:22
2.	"Folklore"	Longdon	08:27
3.	"Brave Captain"	Longdon	11:57
4.	"Last Train"	Spawton	06:37
5.	"London Plane"	Spawton	10:43
6.	"Meadowland"	Sjoblom / Longdon / Spawton	03:45
7.	"A Mead Hall in Winter"	Sjoblom / Longdon / Spawton	15:30

Disc two

No.	Title	Writer(s)	Length
1.	"Experimental Gentlemen Part Two"	Spawton	06:03
2.	"Swan Hunter"	Longdon / Spawton	06:55
3.	"Judas Unrepentant"	Longdon	07:29
4.	"The Transit of Venus Across the Sun"	Spawton	07:47
5.	"East Coast Racer"	Spawton / Manners	16:04
6.	"Telling the Bees"	Longdon	05:41
7.	"Victorian Brickwork"	Spawton	13:46
8.	"Drums and Brass"	D’Virgilio	05:05
9.	"Wassail"	Longdon	07:55

== Musicians ==
- David Longdon - Vocals, Flute, Percussion
- Greg Spawton - Bass Guitar
- Nick D’Virgilio - Drums, Percussion, Vocals
- Danny Manners - Keyboards
- Andy Poole - Keyboards, Guitar
- Dave Gregory - Guitar
- Rikard Sjöblom - Guitar, Keyboards, Vocals
- Rachel Hall - Violin, Vocals

with

- Dave Desmond - Trombone
- Ben Godfrey - Trumpet
- Nick Stones - French Horn
- John Storey - Euphonium
- Jon Truscott - Tuba
