= Make Some Noise (EP) =

EP by Big Big Train
- Released: 23 September 2013
- Recorded: English Electric Studios
- Genre: Progressive rock, new prog
- Length: 45:45
- Label: English Electric
- Producer: Andy Poole

Big Big Train chronology
English Electric Part Two (2013)	Make Some Noise (2013)	English Electric: Full Power (2013)

Make Some Noise is the second official studio EP by the English progressive rock band Big Big Train. It was released on 23 September 2013 by English Electric Recordings and Burning Shed. It contains four new tracks from the compilation album English Electric: Full Power, plus a selection of tracks from English Electric Part One and English Electric Part Two, two of which (“Keeper of Abbeys” and “Curator of Butterflies”) are edited versions.

== Track listing ==
No.	Title	Music	Length
1.	"Make Some Noise"	Longdon	4:31
2.	"Uncle Jack"	Longdon	3:49
3.	"Keeper of Abbeys (branch line edition)"	Spawton	5:41
4.	"Leopards"	Longdon	3:55
5.	"Swan Hunter"	Longdon/Spawton	6:19
6.	"Seen Better Days"	Spawton	7:38
7.	"Edgelands"	Manners/Spawton	1:33
8.	"The Lovers"	Longdon	5:33
9.	"Curator of Butterflies (branch line edition)"	Spawton	6:51

== Personnel ==
- Nick D'Virgilio – drums, cajon, backing vocals
- Dave Gregory – 6 and 12 string electric guitars, electric sitar
- David Longdon – lead vocals, flute, acoustic guitar, banjo, accordion, melodica, keyboards, vibraphone, tambourine, dumbek, the birds and the bees
- Danny Manners – keyboards, double bass, baritone bee
- Andy Poole – electric piano, acoustic guitar, backing vocals
- Gregory Spawton – bass guitar, 6 and 12 string acoustic guitars, mandolin, backing vocals

Guest musicians

- Lily Adams – backing vocals, soprano bee
- Violet Adams – backing vocals, soprano bee
- Robin Armstrong – backing vocals
- Geraldine Berreen – violin
- Sue Bowran – violin
- Dave Desmond – trombone
- Ben Godfrey – cornet
- Rachel Hall – violin
- Lord Cornelius Plum – backwards guitar
- John Storey – euphonium
- Abigail Trundle – cello
- Jon Truscott – tuba
- Teresa Whipple – viola
- String arrangement on Leopards by Louis Phillipe
- Brass arrangement on Curator of Butterflies by Dave Desmond
- String arrangement on Curator of Butterflies by Dave Gregory
- Mixing and mastering by Rob Aubrey at Aubitt Studios
