= Welcome to the Planet =

Studio album by Big Big Train
- Released: 28 January 2022
- Studio: Real World, Box, Wiltshire, England; Sweetwater, Fort Wayne, Indiana; Aubitt, Southampton, UK; Castlesound, Pencaitland, Edinburgh, Scotland
- Genre: Progressive rock
- Length: 47:10
- Label: English Electric
- Producer: Big Big Train

Big Big Train chronology
Common Ground (2021)	Welcome to the Planet (2022)	Ingenious Devices (2023)

Welcome to the Planet is the fourteenth studio album by English progressive rock band Big Big Train, released 28 January 2022. It was their first album to be released since the death of lead singer David Longdon and first to feature new violinist Clare Lindley, as well as former session contributors Dave Foster and Carly Bryant as full members. It is also the last to feature Bryant who departed the band in January 2023.

== Track listing ==
Welcome to the Planet track listing
No.	Title	Lyrics	Music	Length
1.	"Made from Sunshine"	David Longdon	Dave Foster	4:05
2.	"The Connection Plan"	Nick D'Virgilio	Nick D'Virgilio	3:55
3.	"Lanterna"	Gregory Spawton	Gregory Spawton	6:29
4.	"Capitoline Venus"	Gregory Spawton	Gregory Spawton	2:26
5.	"A Room with No Ceiling"	instrumental	Rikard Sjöblom	4:51
6.	"Proper Jack Froster"	Gregory Spawton	Gregory Spawton	6:38
7.	"Bats in the Belfry"	instrumental	Nick D'Virgilio	4:54
8.	"Oak and Stone"	Gregory Spawton	Gregory Spawton, Nick D'Virgilio, Rikard Sjöblom	7:12
9.	"Welcome to the Planet"	Carly Bryant	Carly Bryant	6:40
Total length:				47:10

== Personnel ==
per liner notes

- David Longdon – vocals (all but 5 and 7); tambourine (track 1); mellotron, piano (track 4), flute (track 9)
- Gregory Spawton – bass guitar (all tracks except 4 & 8); bass pedals (tracks 2, 6–9); 12 string-acoustic guitar (tacks 3 & 4); 6 string-acoustic guitar, mellotron, organ, synthesizer, backing vocals (track 3); spoken voice (track 9)
- Nick D'Virgilio – drums (all tracks except 4); vocals (tracks 2, 3, 8); vibraphone (track 2); mellotron (tracks 2, 7); percussion loops, keyboards (track 3); sleigh bells (track 6); fender Rhodes, organ, synthesizer (track 7); percussion (track 9)
- Rikard Sjöblom – Hammond organ (track 1, 2, 3, 5, 6, 8); backing vocals (track 1, 3); mellotron (track 2, 5), guitar (tracks 2, 3, 5, 7, 9); ARP synthesizer (track 2); accordion, fender Rhodes (track 5), Wurlitzer piano, piano (tracks 6, 8); 12 string acoustic guitar (track 6)
- Dave Foster – electric and acoustic guitar (track 1); 6-and 12-string electric guitars (track 6)
- Carly Bryant – piano (tracks 1, 3, 9); backing vocals (tracks 1, 3), vocals (tracks 6, 9) synthesizer (track 9)
- Clare Lindley – vocals (track 1), violin (tracks 6, 9)

with

- John Storey – euphonium (tracks 1, 6–9)
- Nick Stones – French horn (tracks 1, 6–9)
- Dave Desmond – trombone (tracks 1, 6–9), brass arrangements
- Ben Godfrey – trumpet (tracks 1, 6–9)
- Jon Truscott – tuba (tracks 1, 6–9)
- Derek Reeves – violin (track 2)
- Aidan O'Rourke – violin (tracks 3, 8); soundscapes (track 3)
- Riaan Vosloo – double bass (track 8)

Technical

- Rob Aubrey – mixing, mastering, engineer at Real World and Aubitt Studios
- Sarah Louise Ewing – artwork
- Ioan Hazell – assistant engineer at Real World Studios
- Rachel Leonard – assistant engineer at Sweetwater Studios
- Stuart Hamilton – engineer at Castlesound Studios
- Bobby Dellarocco, Shawn Dealey – engineers at Sweetwater

== Charts ==
Chart performance for Welcome to the Planet
Chart (2022)	Peak position
Scottish Albums (OCC)	9
UK Albums (OCC)	44
UK Independent Albums (OCC)	6
