= Goodbye to the Age of Steam =

Goodbye To The Age of Steam

Studio album by Big Big Train
- Released: May 31, 1994
- Recorded: Parklands Studios
- Genre: Progressive rock
- Length: 51:33
- Language: English
- Label: Giant Electric Pea
- Producer: Rob Aubrey, Andy Poole, Greg Spawton

Big Big Train chronology
The Infant Hercules (1993)	Goodbye To The Age of Steam (1994)	English Boy Wonders (1997)

Goodbye To The Age of Steam is the debut studio album by the English progressive rock band, Big Big Train. It was released in 1994, by Giant Electric Pea. On the official BBT website, Spawton has revealed that "much of the album was about how people lose their way in their lives; about the tightrope we all walk every day. The album title wasn't linked to this, but it conveyed a feeling of pathos which fitted the mood of the songs."

== Re-release ==
The original album is out of print. In 2010 it was remastered by members of the band, and the track list has been expanded by three tracks: one being recorded for the 1993 demo The Infant Hercules, one newly recorded instrumental track from the 2010 line-up (including Nick D'Virgilio on drums and David Longdon on keyboards), and an expanded version of the original album track "Losing Your Way". The remastered version was released in 2011 with new artwork and liner notes.

== Track listing ==
No.	Title	Writer(s)	Length
1.	"Wind Distorted Pioneers"	Spawton	3:21
2.	"Head Hit the Pillow"	Spawton	5:48
3.	"Edge of the Known World"	Spawton	4:47
4.	"Landfall"	Spawton	4:18
5.	"Dragon Bone Hill"	Spawton	3:52
6.	"Blow the House Down"	Spawton, Cooper	9:20
7.	"Expecting Snow"	Spawton	2:36
8.	"Blue Silver Red"	Spawton, Poole	10:03
9.	"Losing Your Way"	Spawton	7:28

=== 2011 bonus tracks ===
1. Far Distant Thing (Spawton) – 4:35 (1993 recording, originally released on The Infant Hercules)
2. Expecting Dragons (Spawton) – 7:16 (new recording)
3. Losing Your Way (Spawton) – 10:01 (extended version)

== Personnel ==
- Ian Cooper – keyboards
- Steve Hughes – drums and percussion
- Andy Poole – bass
- Martin Read – vocals
- Greg Spawton – guitars, additional keyboards
- David Longdon – flute and keyboards on Expecting Dragons, 2011
- Nick D'Virgilio – drums on Expecting Dragons, 2011

=== Guest musicians ===
- Rob Aubrey – backing vocals
- Ken Bundy – backing vocals
- Gary Chandler – backing vocals
- Sally French – backing vocals
- Stuart Nicholson – backing vocals
- Martin Orford – backing vocals
- Mandy Taylor – backing vocals
- Steve Christey – windchimes
