= A Stone's Throw from the Line =

Live album by Big Big Train
- Released: 2 December 2016
- Recorded: 14 to 16 August 2015
- Venues: King’s Place, London
- Genres: Progressive rock, new prog
- Label: English Electric
- Producer: Big Big Train

Big Big Train chronology
A Stone's Throw from the Line (2016)	Merchants of Light (2018)

A Stone's Throw from the Line is a live CD recording of Big Big Train's August 2015 Concerts at The Kings Place, London. The finished output was first released on Friday 2 December 2016.

These shows saw Big Big Train return to the stage after a 17-year absence. The two CD set features the best performance of each song from the three Kings Place performances, and the track list reflects the running order of the show. The album comes in a gloss, laminated soft pack with a 40-page booklet.

== Reception ==
The first two shows themselves sold out in hours, which points to a loyal and dedicated fan base. A third show was added and the resultant concerts were then voted Prog Magazine's "Event of the Year". ProgReport's review of the concerts and this subsequent recording uses terms such as exceptional, indispensable, and a feast. Overall the review indicates "this band is in very fine form indeed".

The Progressive Aspect in praising the album said "If you do not know Big Big Train, then A Stone’s Throw From The Line will serve as an introduction worth having. If you do, but were not there, the spirit of those shows shines throughout." Louder noted how "the band have handpicked the best performances to recreate the running order of those magnetic shows". Rebel Noise observed that "By and large, A Stone’s Throw from the Line isn’t especially surprising, as it offers fans nothing more or less than flawless live takes on some of the band’s greatest feats."

== Track listing ==
Disc one

No.	Title	Writer(s)	Length
1.	"Make Some Noise"	David Longdon	5:21
2.	"The First Rebreather"	Greg Spawton	8:32
3.	"The Underfall Yard"	Spawton	21:56
4.	"Uncle Jack"	Longdon	4:14
5.	"Victorian Brickwork"	Spawton	13:39

Disc two

No.	Title	Writer(s)	Length
1.	"Kingmaker"	Spawton	11:09
2.	"Wassail"	Longdon	8:08
3.	"Summoned By Bells"	Spawton	9:08
4.	"Judas Unrepentant (including Nick D'Virgilio drum solo)"	Longdon	9:42
5.	"Curator of Butterflies"	Spawton	8:20
6.	"East Coast Racer"	Spawton	16:32
7.	"Hedgerow"	Longdon/Andy Poole/Spawton	9:11
