= Martin Orford =

British musician

Martin Orford (born 10 June 1959, Bitterne, Southampton) is an English keyboard player and singer. He is best known as the founder of progressive rock bands IQ and Jadis. He also worked with former King Crimson, U.K. and Asia bassist John Wetton, and has released two solo albums, Classical Music and Popular Songs (2000) and The Old Road (2008). Orford appeared on two Big Big Train albums, Goodbye to the Age of Steam and English Boy Wonders.

Orford won the "Best Keyboard Player" category at the Best of the Year Classic Rock Society Award in 2004.

Orford's most recent solo album, The Old Road (GEPCD1037), was released in October 2008. The album features guest appearances from John Wetton, Nick D'Virgilio and Dave Meros (Spock's Beard), Steve Thorne, John Mitchell (Arena/Frost*/It Bites), Gary Chandler (Jadis), Dave Oberle (Gryphon), David Longdon (Big Big Train) and Andy Edwards (IQ/Frost*).

Orford announced his retirement from the music industry in October 2008. He made a return for MelloFest 2009, performing tracks from The Old Road as well as some IQ numbers.

He returned to playing with Jadis in 2016 for the album No Fear of Looking Down and has remained a member since.
