= Dave Foster (guitarist) =

English guitarist (born 1971)

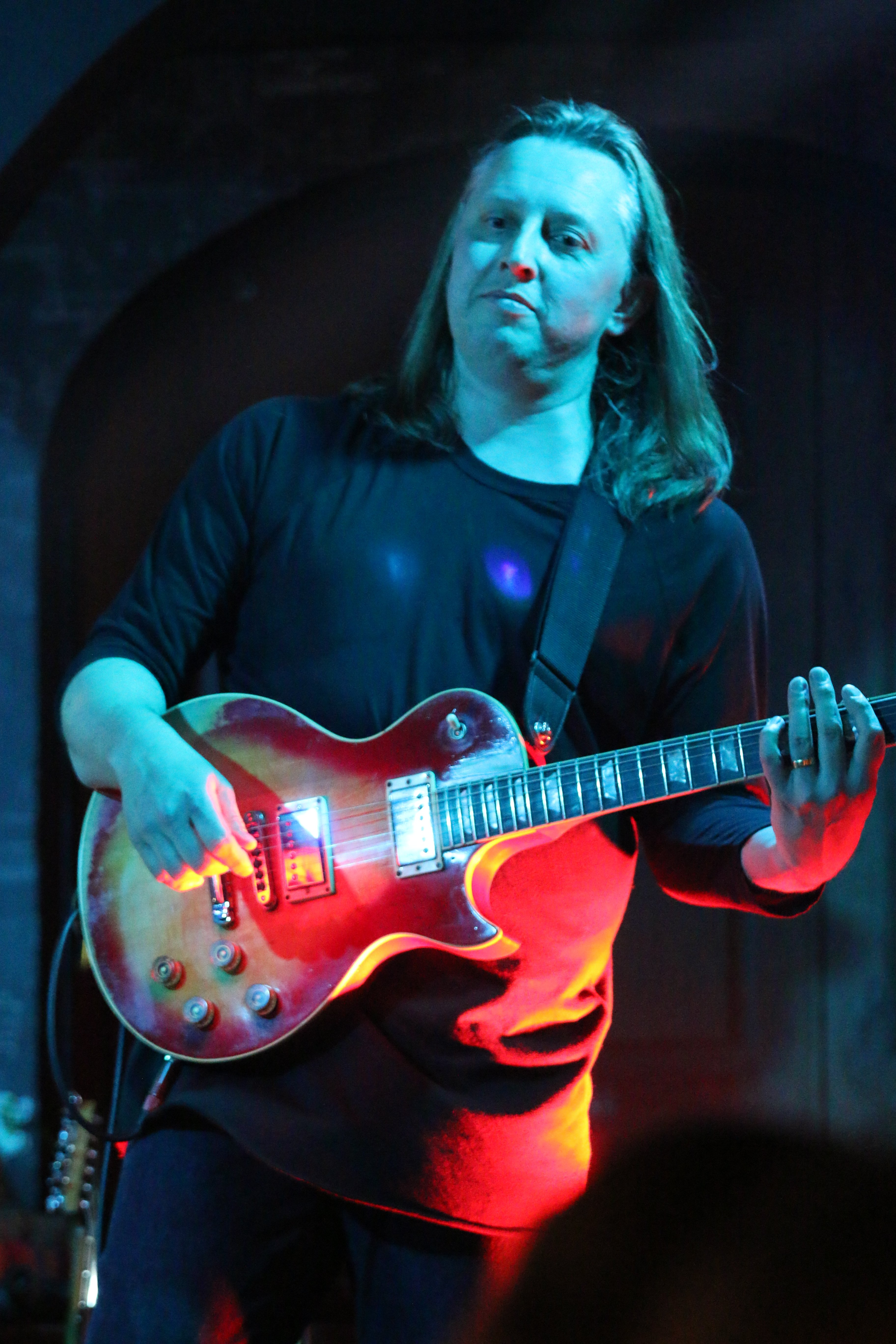
- Foster with Panic Room in 2017

Background information
- Born: January 1971 (age 55); St Helens, Lancashire, England
- Genre: Progressive rock
- Occupation: Guitarist
- Years active: 1997–present
- Member of: Steve Rothery band; Dave Foster Band
- Formerly of: Panic Room; Big Big Train; Mr So-&-So

Dave Foster (born January 1971) is an English progressive rock guitarist, known for his work with Steve Rothery, Panic Room, Big Big Train, and for leading his own band, The Dave Foster Band.

== Biography ==
Foster was born in St Helens, Merseyside; he started playing guitar at age six while attending Bleak Hill Primary School before moving on to Rainford High School. In 1987 he started music college in Liverpool before moving to the Leigh College of Music after a year, (Note: this citation says 1997, I believe this is a mis type as other articles say late 80s and Mr. So-&-So's first demo was released in 1991.) where he formed Mr So-&-So with Shaun McGowan (bass & vocals), Leon Parr (drums), Kieren Twist (keyboards) and Charlotte Evans (vocals). The band released three albums before disbanding in 2001.

Prior to recording The Overlap, Foster met Steve Rothery of Marillion, who was a fan of Mr So-&-So and signed the band to his label Dorian Music. Foster formed Sleeping Giant in 2001 with Charlotte Evans on vocals, Leon Parr on drums, Simon Crumley on bass and James Rimmer on keyboards. The band released two EPs (Primates and Embers) before disbanding in 2006.

In 2008, Foster joined the live band for Steve Rothery's folk rock project, The Wishing Tree, which also featured Marillion's Pete Trewavas. In 2011 Foster released his debut solo album Gravity, which featured Dutch vocalist Dinet Poortman, whom he met at Marillion weekend, and would regularly collaborate with.

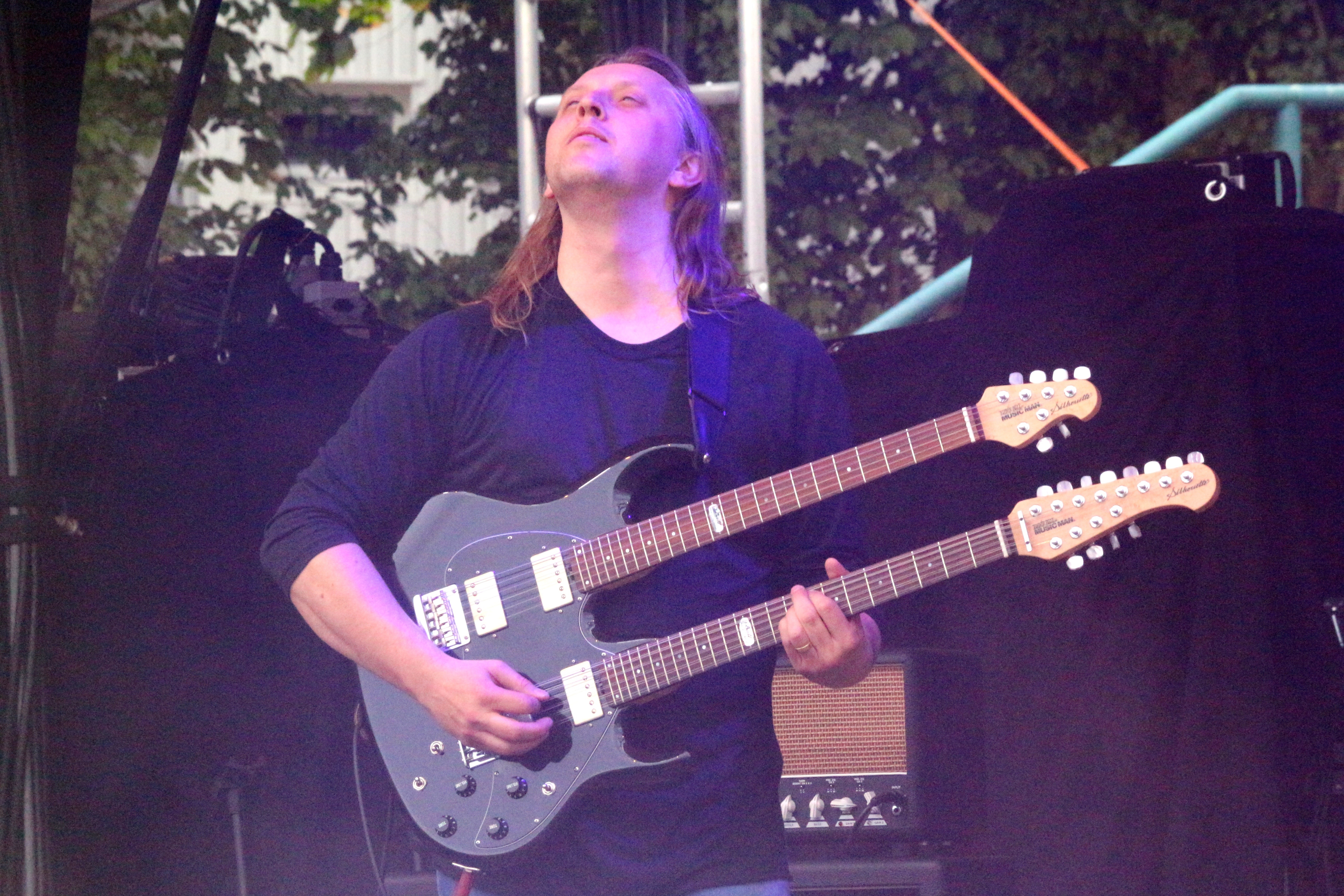
Foster with the Steve Rothery band in 2015

In 2013, Foster joined the Steve Rothery band, alongside Leon Parr (drums), Yatim Halimi (bass) and Riccardo Romano (keyboards) with Martin Jakubski (vocals). Foster co-wrote Rothery's first solo album, The Ghosts Of PripyatI in 2014, which features guest appearances from Steven Wilson and Steve Hackett.

In 2015, Foster joined Welsh progressive rock band, Panic Room, as their lead guitarist on their Wildfire Tour. Appearing on their albums Essence (2015) and Screens – Live In London (2018). Foster left Panic Room in 2018 alongside bassist Yatim Halimi.

Foster released his second solo album, Dreamless, in 2016, again featuring Poortman. He played his debut performance as the Dave Foster Band at the Panic Room Weekend in May 2016, alongside Mr So-&-So member Leon Parr and Poortman. The band's third album, Nocebo, was released in 2019, with some live performances before COVID-19 stopped them. His fourth album Glimmer was released in May 2023.

In 2020, Foster joined the live band of Big Big Train, as a replacement for Dave Gregory, who left earlier that year. Appearing on their albums Common Ground (2021), Welcome To The Planet (2022) and The Likes of Us (2024) and their tours from September 2022. He did not perform with the band in August and September 2023 due to commitments to the Steve Rothery band; for those dates, he was replaced by Italian guitarist Maria Barbieri. He did not perform with the band for US tour dates in March 2024, due to travel costs so the band could have a trumpet player and multi-instrumentalist. In June 2024 it was announced that Foster was leaving Big Big Train due to scheduling issues.

In 2023 Foster joined internationally acclaimed singer songwriter Anneke van Giersbergen on stage at the Night of the Prog festival at Loreley, Germany for a performance of acoustic songs.

2024 saw the release of the third Dave Foster Band album Maybe They'll Come Back For Us (2024), again featuring vocalist Dinet Poortman and drummer Leon Parr alongside various guests including bassists Mark King (Level 42) and Neil Fairclough (Queen + Adam Lambert), as well as piano players Carly Bryant (ex Big Big Train) and Anthony Hindley (ex Mr. So & So).

== Discography ==
=== Solo albums/Dave Foster Band ===
- Gravity (2011)
- Dreamless (2016)
- Nocebo (2019)
- Glimmer (2023)
- Maybe They'll Come Back For Us (2024)

=== with Mr. So-&-So ===
- Thoughts Of Fear And Principle (1991) demo
- Paraphernalia (1992)
- Compendium (1994)
- The Overlap (1997)
- Sugarstealer (2009)
- Truths, Lies & Half Lies (2013)

=== with Sleeping Giant ===
- Embers (2002) EP
- Primates (2002)
- The CRS Acoustic Sessions (2003)

=== with Steve Rothery ===
- Live In Plovdiv (2013)
- The Ghosts Of Pripyat (2014)
- Live At Bush Hall (2014)
- Live In Rome (2014)
- Live In London (2021)

=== with Panic Room ===
- Essence (2015)
- Live at The Fleece (2016)
- Screens - Live in London (2017)

=== with Big Big Train ===
- Common Ground (2021)
- Welcome to the Planet (2022)
- Ingenious Devices (2023)
- The Likes of Us (2024)

=== Other appearances ===
Year	Band	Title	Notes	Cite
2012	The Reasoning	Adventures In Neverland	guitar solo on "No Friend Of Mine"	
2017	Riccardo Romano Land	B612	guitars on two tracks	
2021	Rick Armstrong	Infinite Corridors	guitars on two tracks	
2022	Rick Armstrong	Spatial Elements		
2023	Rick Armstrong	Chromosphere		
