= Bard (album) =

Studio album by Big Big Train
- Released: 2002
- Recorded: Muscliff & Nomansland, September 2000 – December 2001
- Genre: Progressive rock, post-rock
- Length: 67:27
- Label: Treefrog
- Producer: Andy Poole

Big Big Train chronology
English Boy Wonders (1997)	Bard (2002)	Gathering Speed (2004)

Bard is the third studio album by the English progressive rock band, Big Big Train. It was released in 2002 by Treefrog Records. It was the only one of their early albums that the band decided not to re-release and was out-of-print for many years. In the autumn of 2024, Gregory Spawton finally announced a new Rob Aubrey re-mix of the album with a bonus live recording of "The Last English King" from a September 2024 concert. The remix was released on 21st of March 2025 on CD, LP and digital download. The remix was the first collaboration between the two founding members, Gregory Spawton and Andy Poole, since Poole left the band in 2018.

== Track listing ==
No.	Title	Writer(s)	Length
1.	"The Last English King"	Spawton	5:50
2.	"Broken English"	Spawton, Poole, Hogg	14:09
3.	"This Is Where We Came In"	Spawton	5:22
4.	"Harold Rex Interfectus Est"	Spawton	1:02
5.	"Blacksmithing"	Spawton	3:03
6.	"Malfosse"	Spawton	0:53
7.	"Love Is Her Thing"	Spawton	3:50
8.	"How the Earth from This Place Has Power Over Fire"	Spawton	1:53
9.	"A Short Visit to Earth"	Spawton	6:18
10.	"For Winter"	Spawton, Poole	16:47
11.	"A Long Finish"	Spawton	8:20

== Personnel ==
- Ian Cooper - keyboards, piano
- Phil Hogg - drums, percussion
- Tony Müller - keyboards, piano, lead and backing vocals
- Andy Poole - bass, backing vocals
- Martin Read - lead and backing vocals
- Gregory Spawton - guitars, keyboards, backing vocals

Guest musicians

- Jo Michaels - vocals
- Rob Aubrey - windchimes
