= English Electric Part Two =

Studio album by Big Big Train
- Released: 4 March 2013
- Genre: Progressive rock, new prog
- Length: 57:35
- Label: English Electric / GEP

Big Big Train chronology
| English Electric Part One (2012) | English Electric Part Two (2013) | Make Some Noise (2013) |

English Electric Part Two is the eighth studio album by the English progressive rock band Big Big Train. It was released on 4 March 2013, by English Electric Recordings and GEP.

== Track listing ==
All tracks are written by Greg Spawton, except where noted.

| No. | Title | Writer(s) | Length |
|---|---|---|---|
| 1. | "East Coast Racer" | | 15:43 |
| 2. | "Swan Hunter" | Spawton, David Longdon | 6:20 |
| 3. | "Worked Out" | | 7:30 |
| 4. | "Leopards" | Longdon | 3:54 |
| 5. | "Keeper of Abbeys" | | 6:58 |
| 6. | "The Permanent Way" | | 8:29 |
| 7. | "Curator of Butterflies" | | 8:44 |

== Personnel ==
- Nick D'Virgilio – drums (all tracks), cajon (track 5, 7), backing vocals (track 6)
- Dave Gregory – electric guitar (all tracks), E-bow guitar (track 1), marimba (track 3), 12 string electric guitar (track 5)
- David Longdon – lead and backing vocals (all tracks), flute (track 3, 5, 7), vibes, shaker (track 2), banjo (track 2, 4), percussion (track 3), acoustic guitar, piano, organ synthesizer (track 4), tambourine, accordion, Dumbek (track 5)
- Danny Manners - keyboards (track 1), piano (track 1, 2, 3, 6, 7), organ, synthesizer (track 3), double bass (track 4, 5)
- Andy Poole – keyboards (track 1), backing vocals (all tracks), acoustic guitar (track 3, 5), mandolin and electric piano (track 5), 12 string acoustic guitar, bass pedals (track 7)
- Gregory Spawton – bass guitar (all track 4), electric guitar (track 1, 3), mellotron (track 1), backing vocals (all tracks), mandolin (track 1, 5), 12-string guitar (track 1, 3, 7), acoustic guitar (track 3, 5), organ (track 5)

Guest musicians

- Abigail Trundle - cello (track 1, 4, 5, 6, 7)
- Megan Fisher – harp (track 1)
- Andy Tillison - organ (track 1, 6), synthesizer (track 1), Tillisification (track 6)
- Rob Aubrey – bass pedals (track 1)
- Eleanor Gilchrist - violin (track 1, 7)
- Geraldine Berreen - violin (track 1, 4, 7)
- Teresa Whipple - viola (track 1, 4, 7)
- Ben Godfrey - cornet (track 1, 2, 6, 7), trumpet, piccolo trumpet
- Dave Desmond - trombone (track 1, 2, 6, 7)
- Jon Truscott - tuba (track 1, 2, 6, 7)
- John Storey - euphonium (track 1, 2), trombone (track 1, 2, 6, 7)
- Rachel Hall - acoustic and electric violin (track 3, 5, 6)
- Simon Godfrey - backing vocals (track 3)
- Sue Bowran - violin (track 4)
- Lily Adams - backing vocals (track 6)
- Violet Adams - backing vocals (track 6)
- Jan Jaap Langereis - recorders (track 6)
