= English Boy Wonders =

Studio album by Big Big Train
- Released: 1997
- Recorded: Parklands Studios
- Genre: Progressive rock
- Length: 71:39
- Label: Giant Electric Pea
- Producer: Andy Poole, Gregory Spawton

Big Big Train chronology
Goodbye to the Age of Steam (1994)	English Boy Wonders (1997)	Bard (2002)

Professional ratings
Review scores
Source	Rating
Classic Rock	(re-release)

English Boy Wonders is the second studio album by the English progressive rock band, Big Big Train. It was released in 1997 by Giant Electric Pea.

== Track listing ==
No.	Title	Writer(s)	Length
1.	"Big Empty Skies"	Spawton	4:21
2.	"Brushed Aside"	Spawton	5:37
3.	"A Giddy Thing"	Spawton	5:16
4.	"28 Years"	Read, Spawton	2:24
5.	"Pretty Mom"	Spawton, Poole	3:26
6.	"Out of It"	Spawton	5:57
7.	"Cloudless and Starry and Still"	Spawton, Poole	3:33
8.	"Albion Perfide"	Spawton, Poole, Muller	10:23
9.	"Right to the End of the World Tra-La"	Spawton	1:56
10.	"The Shipping Forecast"	Spawton	10:46
11.	"Mr Boxgroveman"	Spawton, Poole	6:12
12.	"Reaching for John Dowland"	Spawton, Poole, Hughes	8:13
13.	"Fell Asleep"	Spawton	3:35

=== Re-release ===
In February 2008, it was announced on Big Big Train's BlogSpot that English Boy Wonders was going to be re-recorded and partially re-mixed. It was re-released on the band's new record label, English Electric, on 1 December 2008.

The re-release adds one track and changes the running order.

1. "Big Empty Skies" – 4:23
2. "Brushed Aside" – 5:40
3. "Albion Perfide"^{[†]} – 10:27
4. "Pretty Mom"^{[†]} – 3:43
5. "A Giddy Thing"^{[†]} – 5:17
6. "Out of It"^{[†]} – 6:02
7. "Cloudless and Starry and Still"^{[†]} – 3:36
8. "Two Poets Meet" (Spawton) – 4:26 (Re-issue Bonus Track)
9. "28 Years" – 2:28
10. "Reaching for John Dowland" – 8:46
11. "Boxgrove Man" – 7:23
12. "The Shipping Forecast"^{[†]} – 10:14
13. "Right to the End of the World Tra-La"^{[†]} – 2:03
14. "Fell Asleep"^{[†]} – 3:59

^{[†]} Tracks 3–7 are grouped as For Autumn (Parts 1–5) and tracks 12–14 as For Autumn (Parts 6–8).

== Personnel ==
- Martin Read – lead vocals
- Gregory Spawton – guitars, keyboards, vocals
- Tony Müller – piano
- Andy Poole – bass, bass pedals, keyboards, vocals
- Steve Hughes – drums, percussion

Guest musicians

- Ken Bundy – backing vocals
- Martin Orford – flute, keyboards
