= The Underfall Yard =

Studio album by Big Big Train
- Released: 15 December 2009
- Genres: Progressive rock, new prog
- Length: 60:38
- Label: English Electric

Big Big Train chronology
The Difference Machine (2007)	The Underfall Yard (2009)	Far Skies Deep Time (EP) (2010)

The Underfall Yard is the sixth studio album by the English progressive rock band Big Big Train, and their first to feature vocalist and multi-instrumentalist David Longdon. It was released on 15 December 2009, by English Electric Recordings.

== Background ==
The Underfall Yard consists of an opening instrumental track and 5 songs. The album has an elegiac atmosphere, with a number of the songs exploring historical themes in an almost nostalgic manner.

The opening instrumental track, "Evening Star", sets out some of the instrumental motifs which recur in the title track.

Two of the songs, "Master James of St. George" and "Victorian Brickwork", are about Spawton's father, who died shortly before the album was released.

"Last Train" is a song about a Mr Delia who was the last station master at Hurn railway station, which was an isolated station on a rural branch line on the border of Dorset and Hampshire. The station closed in 1935. The song tells the story of Mr Delia's final day as the last train departs.

"Winchester Diver" is about diver William Walker who, in the early 1900s, worked under the flooded foundations of Winchester Cathedral to save it from collapse. Diving in 20 feet of water and in appalling conditions, Walker shored up the foundations. The song explores the contrast between the dreadful working conditions he endured and life in the cathedral above him, which carried on as normal.

The 23 minute title track, "The Underfall Yard", is a song about Isambard Kingdom Brunel and the great Victorian engineers. The Underfall Yard itself is located in Bristol and is an engineering solution, partly developed by Brunel, to maintain water and silt levels in the city's harbour. The song explores Enlightenment themes, contrasting the rationalism of the Victorian era to a coming 'age of unreason'. The Underfall Yard was initially inspired by Richard Fortey's The Hidden Landscape. In the book, Fortey describes a journey along Brunel's Great Western line, where, as the author travelled west, the rocks are found to be older.

The album was remixed and reissued as a double CD and three-LP set in April 2021 and features new studio re-recordings of "Victorian Brickwork" and "The Underfall Yard", along with a new brass arranged prelude to the title track and the brand new song "Brew and Burgh".

== Track listing ==
All tracks are written by Gregory Spawton.

No.	Title	Length
1.	"Evening Star"	4:53
2.	"Master James of St. George"	6:19
3.	"Victorian Brickwork"	12:33
4.	"Last Train"	6:28
5.	"Winchester Diver"	7:31
6.	"The Underfall Yard"	22:54

Bonus tracks on 2021 reissue

No.	Title	Length
1.	"Songs from the Shoreline": a. "Victorian Brickwork" (2020 Studio Version); b. "Fat Billy Shouts Mine"	18:57 (12:32) (6:25)
2.	"Prelude to the Underfall Yard"	2:23
3.	"The Underfall Yard" (2020 Studio Version)	22:50
4.	"Brew and Burgh"	4:31

== Personnel ==
Per 2021 edition liner notes

- Gregory Spawton – keyboards, bass; guitars (all tracks but 1); 12-string guitars (track 6)
- Andy Poole – keyboards (all tracks except 6); bass (track 4); 12-string acoustic guitar (track 6)
- Nick D'Virgilio – drums; vocals (tracks 3, 6)
- David Longdon – lead vocals; flute (tracks 1, 5, 6); mandolin (tracks 1, 2); glockenspiel (tracks 1, 6); dulcimer, psaltery and organ (track 1); tambourine (track 3); keyboards (track 5)

Guest musicians

- Dave Gregory – guitars (tracks 1, 6), electric sitar (track 1), guitar solo (tracks 2, 3, 4, 6), E-bow (track 2), Mellotron (track 3), sitar (track 6)
- Jon Foyle – electric cello (track 1), cello (tracks 3, 4, 5)
- Rich Evans – cornet (tracks 1, 3, 6), cornet solo (track 3)
- Dave Desmond – trombone (tracks 1, 3, 6)
- Nick Stones – french horn (tracks 1, 3, 6)
- Jon Truscott – tuba (tracks 1, 3, 6)
- Francis Dunnery – guitars and guitar solo (track 6)
- Jem Godfrey – synthesizer solos (track 6)
