= Gregory Spawton =

English songwriter and musician (born 1965)

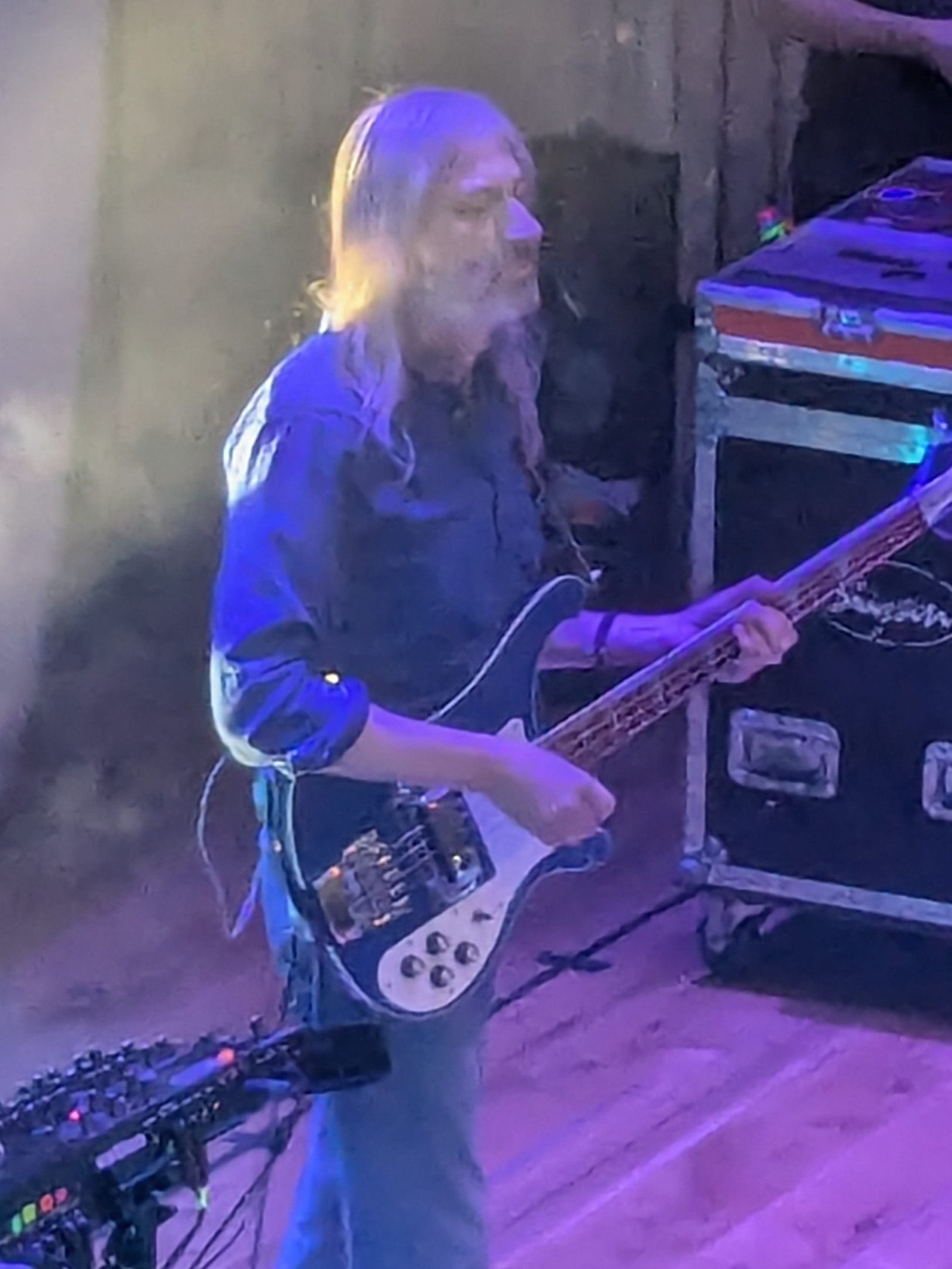
- Spawton with Big Big Train in 2024.

Background information
- Born: 17 May 1965 (age 60)
- Origin: Sutton Coldfield, West Midlands, England
- Genres: Progressive rock; post-rock
- Occupations: Songwriter; musician
- Instruments: Bass; guitar; keyboards
- Years active: 1980s–present
- Labels: English Electric; Giant Electric Pea; Inside Out Music
- Member of: Big Big Train
- Formerly of: Equus
- Spouse: Kathryn Spawton (m. 2015)
- Website: www.bigbigtrain.com/greg-spawton/

Gregory Spawton (born 17 May 1965) is an English musician and songwriter, best known as the bassist, guitarist, keyboardist, songwriter and founder of English progressive rock band Big Big Train.

== Early life ==
Spawton was brought up in Sutton Coldfield in the West Midlands. The first prog album he heard was Selling England by the Pound by Genesis, which belonged to his brother Nigel, when he was 12. The first album he bought was Pawn Hearts by Van der Graaf Generator. He also saw Steve Hackett on his Defector tour in 1980. A heavy influence of his is Peter Hammill.

Before Big Big Train, Spawton was in a band called Equus, which played some shows around Sutton Coldfield in the early 80s.

== Career ==
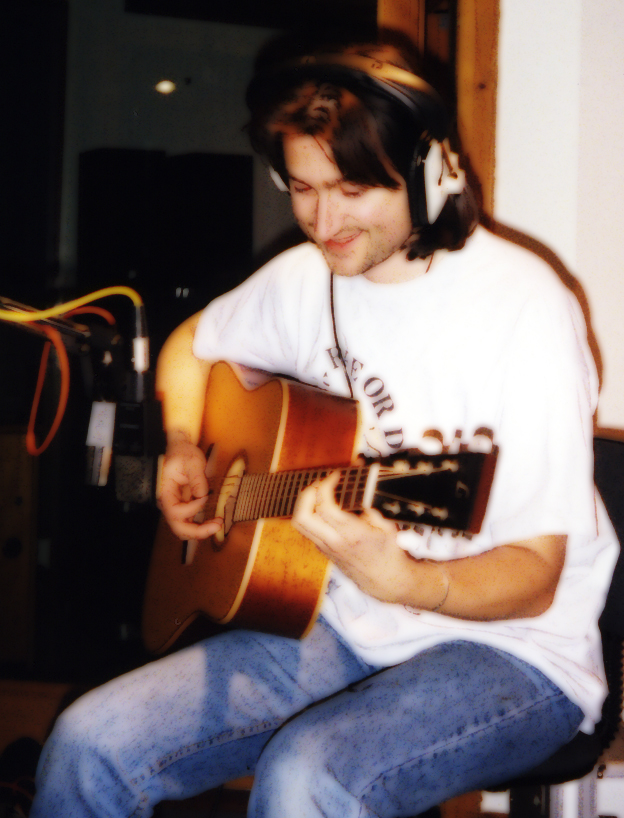
Spawton circa 1997

Spawton moved to Bournemouth in 1987 after graduating from the Reading University. with a degree in archaeology. He formed Big Big Train with Andy Poole in 1990, taking on the role of lead guitarist. They were soon joined by Poole's friend, Ian Cooper, on keyboards, Steve Hughes on drums, and Canadian vocalist Martin Read, who also played acoustic guitar.

Their debut album, Goodbye to the Age of Steam, was released in 1994, with Spawton writing or co-writing all the tracks. He also filled the role of keyboardist after the departure of Cooper for sessions of 1997's English Boy Wonders, before Tony Müller joined as Cooper's replacement for a rare live show at the Astoria, London.

Big Big Train became an independent band after their label GEP dropped them due to disappointing sales. They continued and released Bard, in February 2002. They also released Gathering Speed (2004) and The Difference Machine (2007) with new vocalist Sean Filkins. The former is the only album not to feature any songs solely written by Spawton, and the latter feature guest appearances from Nick D'Virgilio and Dave Meros of Spock's Beard, Pete Trewavas of Marillion, and Mike Holmes of IQ also having some involvement.

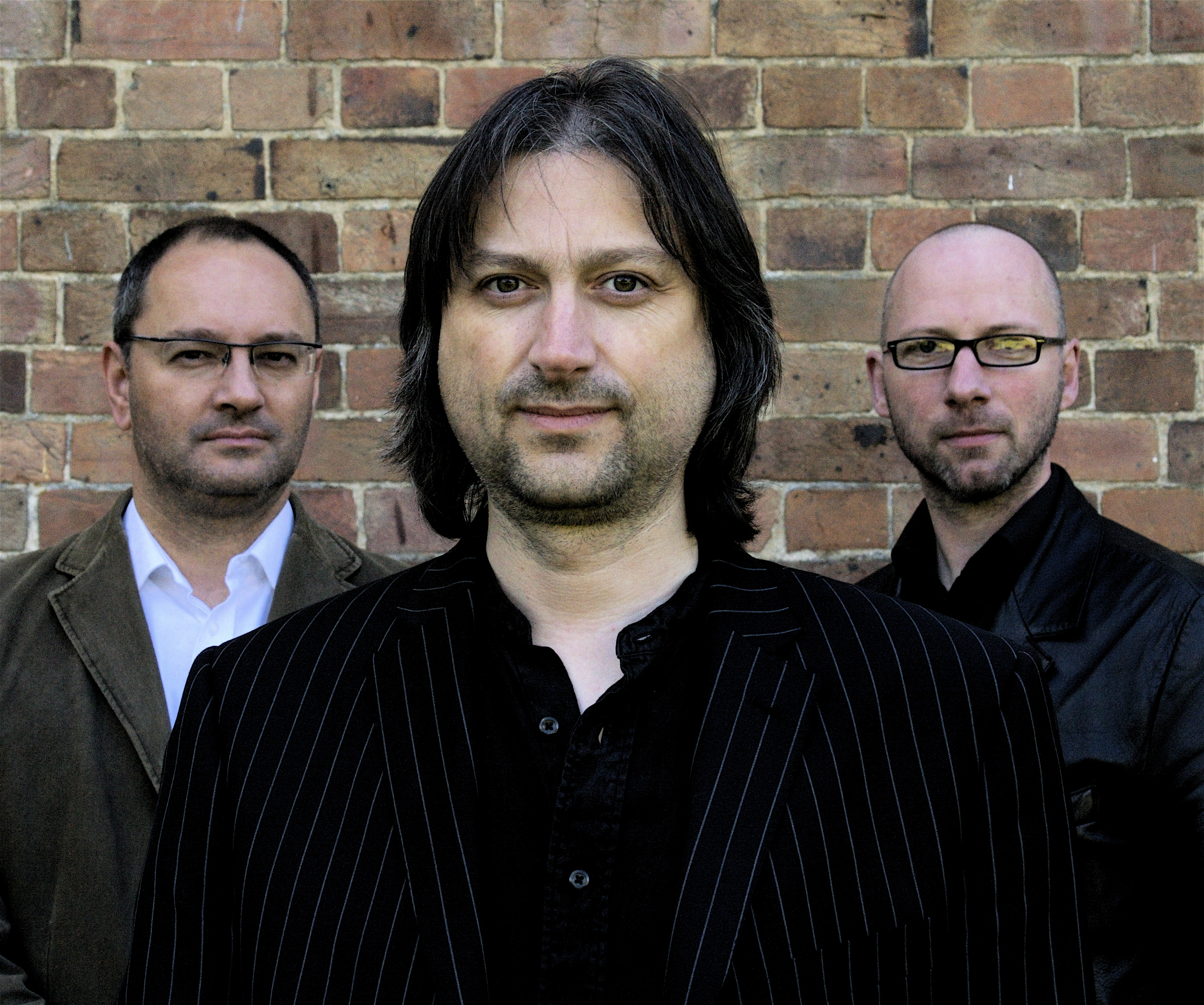
Spawton (middle) in 2009.

In 2009, the band had a fresh start with Sean Filkins and Steve Hughes leaving and being replaced by David Longdon and Nick D'Virgilio. Their resulting breakout album, The Underfall Yard, included Spawton taking up the role of guitarist, keyboardist and bassist, with Poole playing additional keyboards and bass. The album also featured Dave Gregory of XTC on guitars, sitar, Mellotron, with Jem Godfrey playing a synth solo and Francis Dunnery playing a guitar solo on the titular track. The album also featured a four-piece brass section and Jon Foyle on cello. Spawton wrote all tracks on The Underfall Yard.

Dave Gregory joined the band full time to work on their follow-up albums English Electric Part One and Two.

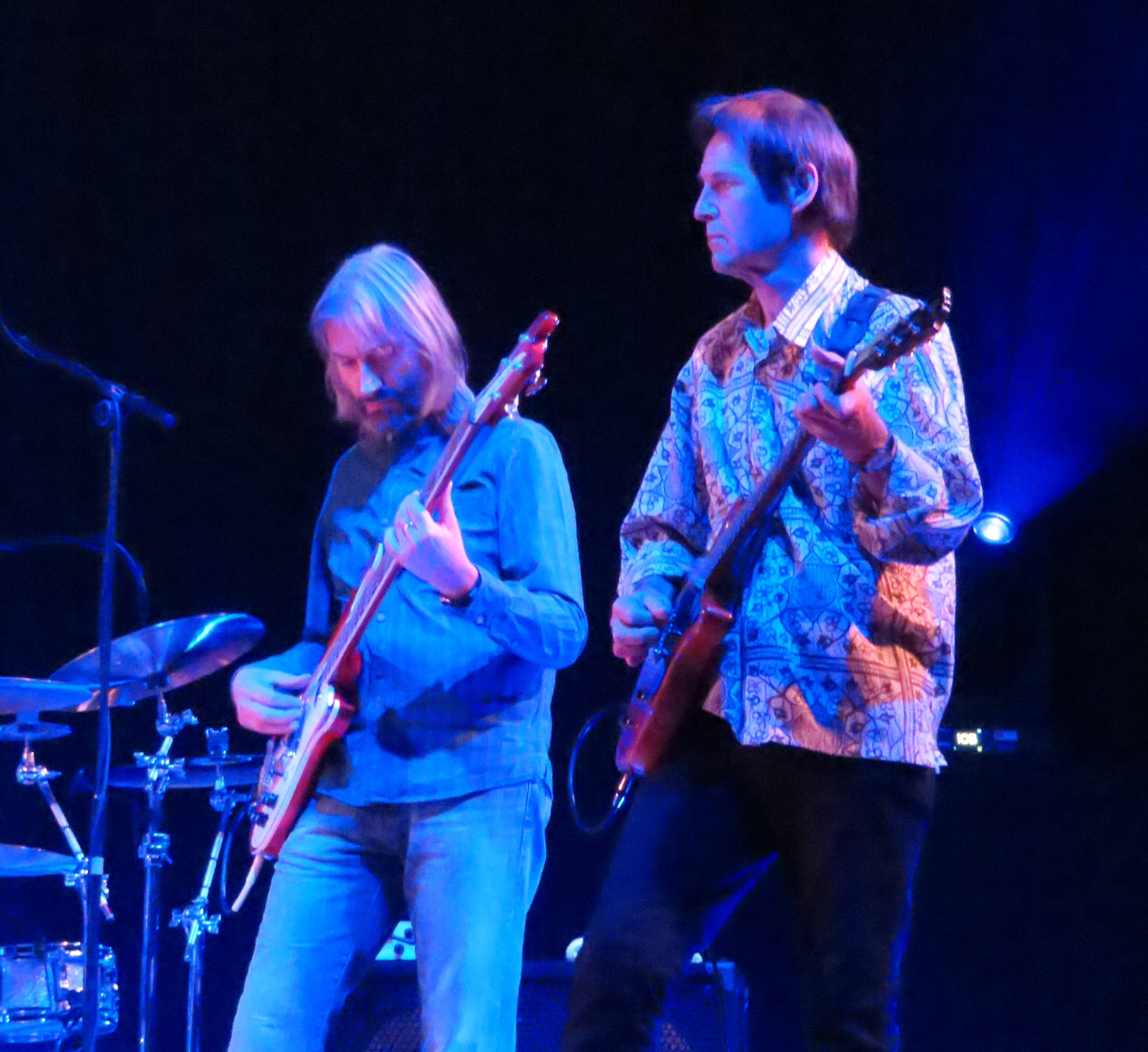
Spawton (left) and Dave Gregory performing with Big Big Train 2019

The band rehearsed for possible future live performances at Real World Studios with new members keyboardist Danny Manners, violinist Rachel Hall (ex-Stackridge) and guitarist/keyboardist Rikard Sjöblom (Beardfish). This line-up continued and released Folklore (2016), Grimspound (2017) and The Second Brightest Star (2017) before Poole departed in January 2018, with Robin Armstrong joining on tour in his place. Spawton has played bass on Armstrong's album, The Man Left In Space with Cosmograf. They released Grand Tour in 2019, which was the last for Hall, Manners and Gregory who all departed in 2020.

Spawton played bass and bass pedals on Between A Breath And A Breath by Judy Dyble and David Longdon in 2020.

The band was rebuilt with Dave Foster (guitars), Carly Bryant (vocals & keyboards) and new violinist Clare Lindley (also ex Stackridge). The former two had performed on Common Ground (2021) and all performed on Welcome to the Planet (2022) which was the last of new material to feature David Longdon, who died in November 2021.

The band has since continued with lead vocalist Alberto Bravin, whom Spawton had seen performing with Premiata Forneria Marconi in 2015 in Camden Town, London.

Outside of Big Big Train, Spawton has played bass on Butterfly Mind (2022) by Tim Bowness. He also played 12-string guitar on David Longdon's posthumous album Door One.

== Personal life ==
Spawton has two children — Ellie (born in 1994) and John (born in 1996). He married his wife, Kathryn, in April 2015.

Spawton has written songs about his childhood and many historical events and people.

He worked as a specialist on homelessness until 2016, when Big Big Train's success made him able to become a full-time musician.
