= The Difference Machine =

Studio album by Big Big Train
- Released: 30 August 2007
- Genre: Progressive rock, new prog
- Length: 58:36
- Label: English Electric

Big Big Train chronology
Gathering Speed (2004)	The Difference Machine (2007)	The Underfall Yard (2009)

Professional ratings
Review scores
Source	Rating
Classic Rock	7/10 stars
Guitar & Bass	(favourable)
Dave Ling	(favourable)
Progression	15.5/16 stars
Traps	(favourable)

The Difference Machine is the fifth studio album by the English progressive rock band Big Big Train. It was released on 30 August 2007, by English Electric Recordings. TDM is a concept album exploring chaos theory, communication, failure, death, loss, and bereavement. The story is of the death of an individual, which was linked to an exploding star in a distant galaxy. There are more influences of Van der Graaf Generator, Genesis, Mew, Sigur Rós and King Crimson throughout the album.

== Track listing ==
No.	Title	Writer(s)	Length
1.	"Hope This Finds You"	Spawton	3:12
2.	"Perfect Cosmic Storm"	Spawton	14:40
3.	"Breathing Space"	Spawton	1:47
4.	"Pick Up If You're There"	Spawton, Poole, Filkins	13:39
5.	"From the Wide Open Sea"	Spawton, Poole	1:20
6.	"Hope You Made It (Re-issue Bonus Track)"	Spawton	3:46
7.	"Salt Water Falling on Uneven Ground"	Spawton, Poole, Filkins	12:38
8.	"Summer's Lease"	Spawton, Poole	7:34

== Personnel ==
- Sean Filkins - lead vocals (tracks 2, 4, 6–8)
- Gregory Spawton - guitars (tracks 1–4, 6–8), keyboards (all tracks), backing vocals (tracks 2, 4)
- Andy Poole - bass (tracks 6–8)
- Steve Hughes - drums (tracks 7, 8)

Guest musicians

- Becca King - viola (tracks 1, 2, 4, 7, 8)
- Rob Aubrey - windchimes
- Tony Wright - alto saxophone (tracks 1, 8), tenor saxophone (tracks 2, 4, 6, 8), flute (track 4)
- Nick D'Virgilio - drums (tracks 2, 4, 6), backing vocals (track 2)
- Dave Meros - bass (track 2)
- Pete Trewavas - bass (track 4)
