= Common Ground (Big Big Train album) =

Studio album by Big Big Train
- Released: 30 July 2021
- Studio: Real World Studios; Sweetwater Studios; The Playpen; Castlesound; Gungfly; Aubitt Studio
- Genre: Progressive rock
- Length: 62:02
- Label: English Electric
- Producer: Big Big Train

Big Big Train chronology
Grand Tour (2019)	Common Ground (2021)	Welcome to the Planet (2022)

Singles from Common Ground
- 1. "Common Ground" Released: 7 May 2021; 2. "Apollo" Released: 11 June 2021; 3. "The Strangest Times" Released: 13 July 2021

Professional ratings
Review scores
Source	Rating
Prog Radio	4.5/5 stars

Common Ground is the thirteenth studio album by the English progressive rock band Big Big Train, released on 30 July 2021. With the departure of Dave Gregory, Rachel Hall, and Danny Manners in 2020, Common Ground is the first album release with the core four-piece lineup of Greg Spawton, David Longdon, Nick D'Virgilio, and Rikard Sjöblom. Joining the core line-up on the album are session musicians Carly Bryant, Dave Foster, and Aidan O'Rourke. Upon release it entered the UK music charts at number 31.

It was elected by PopMatters as the ninth best progressive rock/metal album of 2021.

== Track listing ==
Common Ground
No.	Title	Lyrics	Music	Length
1.	"The Strangest Times"	David Longdon	Longdon	5:07
2.	"All the Love We Can Give"	Nick D'Virgilio	D'Virgilio	8:05
3.	"Black with Ink"	Gregory Spawton	Spawton	7:23
4.	"Dandelion Clock"	Spawton	Spawton	4:14
5.	"Headwaters"	Instrumental	Rikard Sjöblom, Spawton	2:26
6.	"Apollo"	Instrumental	D'Virgilio	7:50
7.	"Common Ground"	Longdon	Longdon	4:53
8.	"Atlantic Cable: "Worlds Apart" (instrumental); "Wayfinders"; "Great Eastern; "Lightning Through Deep Waters" (instrumental); "The Sound of Quiet Voices"	Spawton	Spawton	15:06
9.	"Endnotes"	Spawton	Spawton	6:58
Total length:				62:02

== Charts ==
Chart (2021)	Peak position
German Albums (Offizielle Top 100)	53
Scottish Albums (OCC)	8
UK Albums (OCC)	31
UK Album Downloads (OCC)	10
UK Independent Albums (OCC)	3
UK Progressive Albums (OCC)	1
UK Rock & Metal Albums (OCC)	2

== Personnel ==
Production and performance credits are adapted from the album liner notes.

Big Big Train

- Nick D'Virgilio – drums (all but track 5); vocals (all but tracks 5 and 6); percussion (tracks 2, 8 and 9); Mellotron, EBow guitar (track 2); CP70 electric piano, Fender rhodes, arpeggiator synthesizer, soundscapes (track 6)
- David Longdon – lead and backing vocals (all but track 5 and 6); acoustic guitar, mellophone and synthesizer (track 1); piano, vibraphone, tambourine (track 4); flute (track 6, 8)
- Rikard Sjöblom – Hammond organ (track 1, 2, 3, 4, 6, 8); vocals (all but tracks 5 and 6); piano (tracks 1, 5, 8, 9); synthesizer (track 1, 8); Fender rhodes (track 2, 6); electric 6 and 12 string guitar (track 2, 4); Mellotron (track 3, 6, 9); electric guitar (tracks 3, 6 and 8); ARP Pro Soloist II (track 3); Farfisa organ (track 4 and 9); acoustic guitar (track 4); guitar synthesizer (track 5); clavinet (tracks 6, 8); Church organ, Wurlitzer piano (track 6)
- Greg Spawton – bass guitar, bass pedals (all but track 5); 12-string acoustic guitar (track 4); Mellotron, vocals (track 8); acoustic guitar (tracks 8, 9)
- Carly Bryant – vocals (tracks 1–4, 7–9)
- Dave Foster – guitars (tracks 1,8)

Additional musician

- Aidan O'Rourke – violin (tracks 1, 2, 4, 6–9); soundscapes (tracks 1, 8, 9)

Brass band on tracks 6 and 9

- Dave Desmond – trombone
- Stuart Roberts – trumpet
- Nick Stones – French horn
- John Storey – euphonium
- Jon Truscott – tuba

Production

- Rob Aubrey – mixing, mastering, engineering
- Shawn Dealey – engineering
- Patrick Phillips – engineering
- Stuart Hamilton – engineering
- Dave Desmond – brass arrangements on tracks 6,9
