= Gathering Speed =

Studio album by Big Big Train
- Released: 2004
- Recorded: The Garden Room & Aubitt Studios
- Genre: Progressive rock
- Length: 55:40
- Label: Treefrog
- Producer: Andy Poole, Gregory Spawton, Rob Aubrey

Big Big Train chronology
Bard (2002)	Gathering Speed (2004)	The Difference Machine (2007)

Professional ratings
Review scores
Source	Rating
DPRP	5.5/10 stars

Gathering Speed is the fourth studio album of the English progressive rock band, Big Big Train. It was released in 2004 by Treefrog Records. It is dedicated to the airmen and women who lost their lives in the Battle of Britain. The song The Road Much Further On was originally titled You Can't Draw Love. It was inspired by Spawton's then seven-year-old daughter. The album as a whole was a return to progressive rock for the band. It is the first album in which Sean Filkins recorded vocals, replacing Martin Read. It is also the only album in which Laura Murch recorded vocals, and the only Big Big Train album not to feature any songs solely written by Greg Spawton.

== Track listing ==
No.	Title	Writer(s)	Length
1.	"High Tide, Last Stand"	Spawton, Poole, Hughes, Filkins	7:06
2.	"Fighter Command"	Spawton, Poole, Hughes, Filkins	10:44
3.	"The Road Much Further On"	Spawton, Poole, Filkins	8:39
4.	"Sky Flying on Fire"	Spawton, Poole, Hughes, Filkins	6:04
5.	"Pell Mell"	Spawton, Poole, Hughes, Filkins	6:36
6.	"Powder Monkey"	Spawton, Poole, Filkins	9:08
7.	"Gathering Speed"	Spawton, Poole, Filkins	7:23

== Personnel ==
- Ian Cooper - keyboards
- Sean Filkins - lead vocals, blues harp, percussion
- Steve Hughes - drums, percussion
- Andy Poole - bass
- Gregory Spawton - guitars, additional keyboards, backing vocals

Guest musicians

- Laura Murch - vocals
- Rob Audrey - windchimes
