= Dave Gregory (musician) =

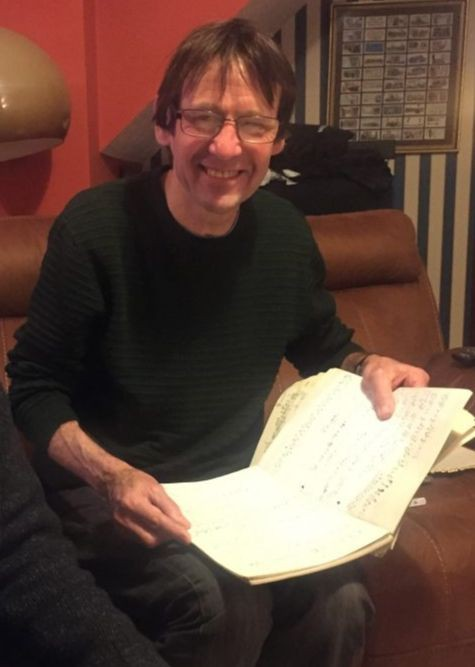
- Gregory in 2020

Background information
- Born: David Charles Gregory; 21 September 1952 (age 74); Swindon, Wiltshire, England
- Occupation: Guitarist
- Formerly of: Gogmagog; Dean Gabber and His Gaberdines; Tin Spirits; XTC; Big Big Train
- Website: guitargonauts.info

David Charles Gregory (born 21 September 1952) is an English guitarist from Swindon, best known for his work with the rock band XTC. He was a member of the group between the single "Life Begins at the Hop" (1979) and early sessions for the album Apple Venus Volume 1 (1999), contributing guitar, keyboards, and occasional string arrangements.

== Career ==
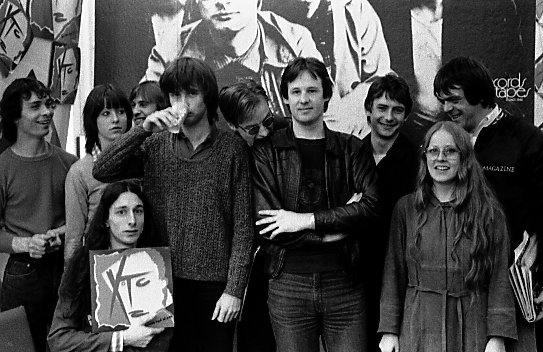
With XTC and fans, 1980

In '76/'77, before XTC Gregory was lead guitarist for Dave Heap's Forest of Dean-based band, Gogmagog along with Jim Leach on keyboard. He was also in the Swindon-based band Dean Gabber and his Gaberdines. He joined XTC as guitarist immediately prior to the recording of the Drums and Wires LP in 1979, when he replaced Barry Andrews, eventually leaving the band in 1999. He also contributed keyboards and backing vocals to their work.

Since leaving XTC Gregory has been much in demand as a session musician with a number of artists, including Peter Gabriel, Aimee Mann, Cud, Marc Almond, Bingo Durango, Circu5, Johnny Hates Jazz, Jason Donovan, Martin Newell, Louis Philippe, Lulu, Mark Owen, R. Stevie Moore and others. Gregory, who has been regularly involved in Steve Hogarth's h-Band, has also contributed to works by Porcupine Tree, including string arrangements on their sixth album, Lightbulb Sun, and for Dublin group Pugwash.

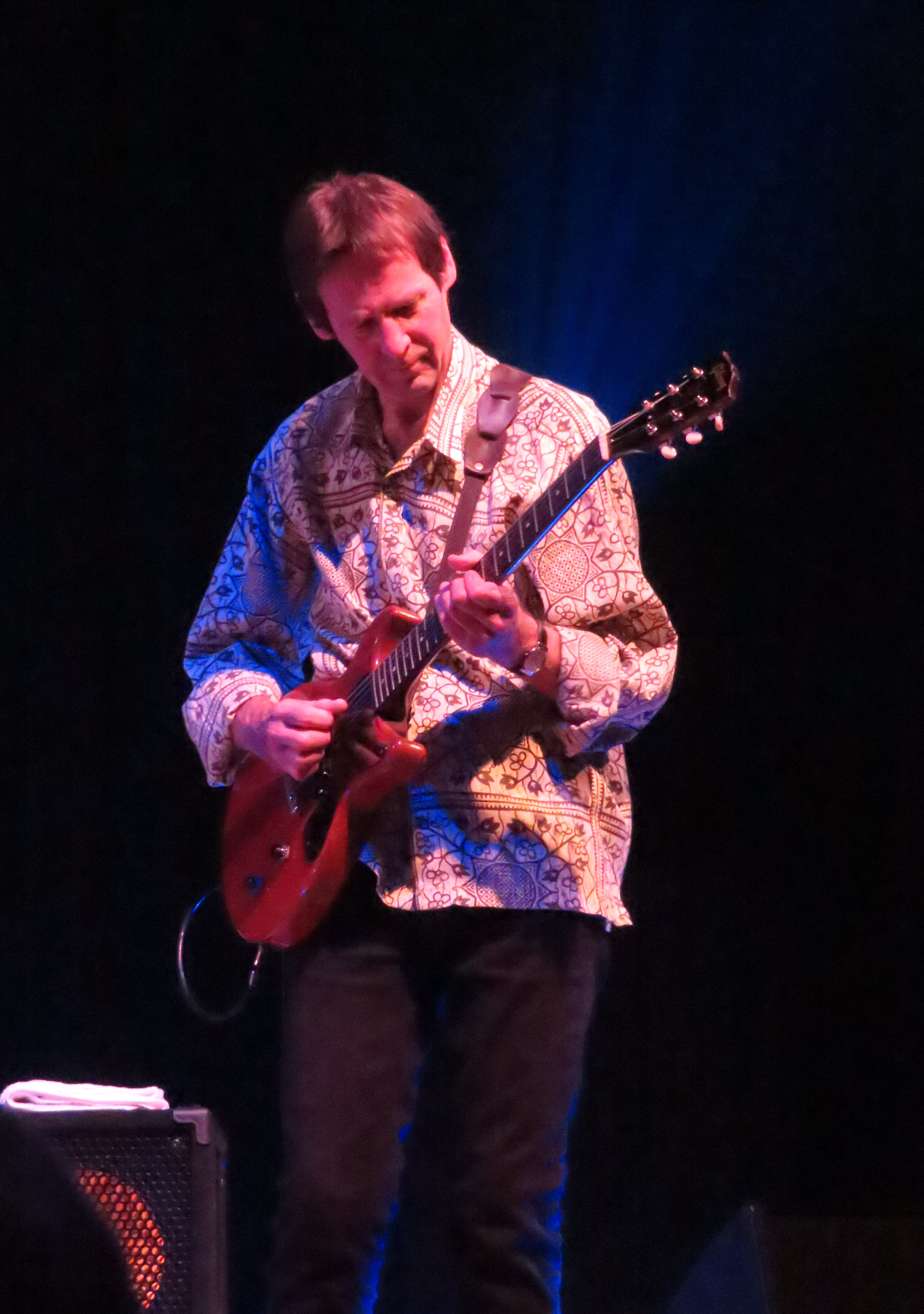
Gregory with Big Big Train in 2019.

On 16 August 2009, English progressive rock band Big Big Train announced on their official blog that Gregory would be appearing as a guest musician on their sixth studio album, The Underfall Yard. Gregory subsequently appeared on Big Big Train's Far Skies Deep Time EP. He was first listed as a full band member on English Electric Part One (2012) and is on all subsequent albums since until early in 2020, when he decided to step down from Big Big Train, at least for the international performances, although he stated "I am proud of the role I have played within Big Big Train and have enjoyed the last decade with the band immensely. I look forward to remaining associated with Big Big Train in the future".

Gregory was also a member of the group Tin Spirits, which featured ex Stamford Amp singer and current Circu5 bassist Mark Kilminster, and also guitarist Daniel Steinhardt and drummer Douglas Mussard. The band released their first mini-album, Wired to Earth, on 1 April 2011, followed by a full-length album, Scorch, on 15 September 2014. Tin Spirits supported Marillion during the Marillionweekend at Port Zélande on 27 March 2011 in the Netherlands. Gregory also guests on the 2012 album Not the Weapon but the Hand by Steve Hogarth and Richard Barbieri. In 2013, Gregory contributed to the book 1001 Guitars to Dream of Playing Before You Die.
