= David Longdon =

British multi-instrumentalist and singer (1965–2021)

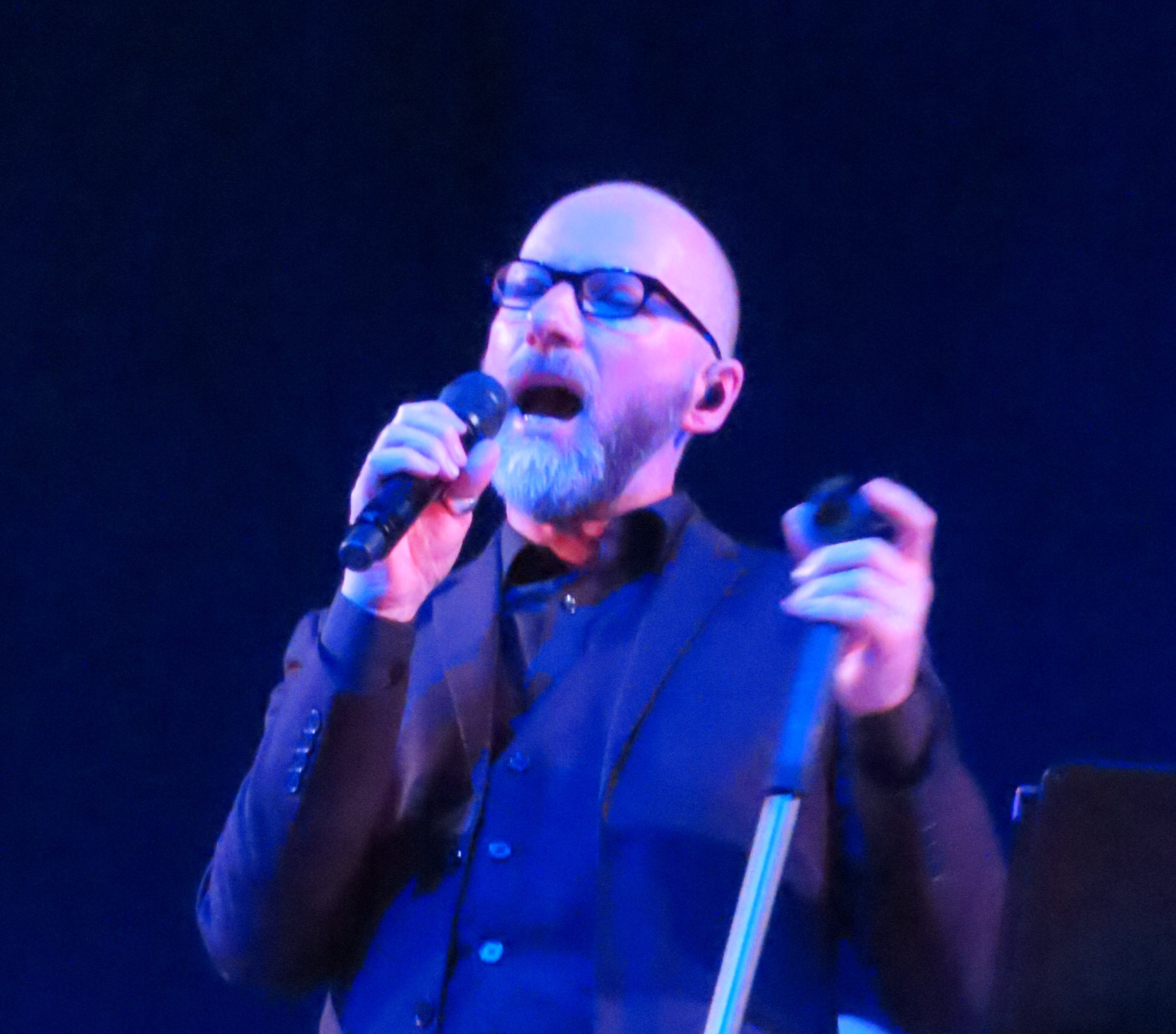
- David Longdon with Big Big Train live at the Town Hall; Birmingham, West Midlands, 2019

Background information
- Born: 17 June 1965; Nottingham, England
- Died: 20 November 2021 (aged 56) Nottingham, England
- Genres: Progressive rock; post-prog
- Occupations: Singer; multi-instrumentalist
- Instruments: Vocals; flute; keyboards; guitar; banjo; mandolin
- Formerly of: Big Big Train
- Website: davidlongdon.net

David Longdon (17 June 1965 – 20 November 2021) was a British singer and multi-instrumentalist, who was best known as the lead vocalist and co-songwriter of the progressive rock band Big Big Train. Besides singing, Longdon played flute, keyboards, acoustic and electric 6 & 12 string guitars, bass, mandolin, lute, banjo, accordion, percussion, dulcimer, psaltry, vibraphone, theremin and glockenspiel.

== Early life and career ==
Longdon was born in Nottingham, England, on 17 June 1965. He began writing music at age nine after discovering The Who. He began his career as the lead singer of the band The Gift Horse. Longdon was one of those who auditioned as lead singer of rock band Genesis in 1996, following the departure of Phil Collins. He auditioned during the making of Calling All Stations (1997), but the role was given to Scottish singer Ray Wilson. He joined Big Big Train in 2009, and performed on numerous instruments in addition to his role as the lead singer beginning with the album The Underfall Yard in 2009.

== Death ==
Longdon had a partner, Sarah Ewing, with whom he had two daughters. He died on 20 November 2021 at the age of 56 in a hospital in Nottingham, after suffering a heavy fall down the stairs at his home in the early hours of the same day. He suffered such severe head injuries that he died of a traumatic brain injury. Steve Hackett described Longdon as "a lovely guy [with] a wonderful voice. He sounded fabulous singing on the vocal version of [Hackett’s song] 'Spectral Mornings'." Neal Morse and Geoff Downes also paid respects following his death. Peter Jones of the band Tiger Moth Tales, with whom Longdon had occasionally worked on stage, included a tribute song to Longdon entitled We'll Remember on the band's 2023 album The Turning of the World.

Longdon’s death almost brought the release of the album Welcome to the Planet, recorded in 2021, to a standstill. At the request of his partner, Sarah Ewing, who also designed the album cover, the album was to be released anyway.

== Trivia ==
On 17 June 2026, the day on which David Longdon would have celebrated his 61st birthday, the ‘David Longdon Foundation’ was established. The foundation has two main objectives. On the one hand, it aims to support young musicians from socio-economically disadvantaged backgrounds through financial grants and mentoring by a panel of professional musicians and experts from the music industry; on the other hand, it aims to fund music therapy for those in need. To this end, the David Longdon Foundation works with Nordoff & Robbins, the UK’s largest music therapy charity, through which all donations are channelled towards music therapy.

The foundation was established by Longdon’s fiancée, Sarah Ewing, and his manager, Nick Shilton, who act as trustees.

== Discography ==
=== With Big Big Train ===
Albums

- The Underfall Yard (2009)
- English Electric Part One (2012)
- English Electric Part Two (2013)
- Folklore (2016)
- Grimspound (2017)
- The Second Brightest Star (2017)
- Grand Tour (2019)
- Common Ground (2021)
- Welcome to the Planet (2022)

EPs

- Far Skies Deep Time (2010)
- Make Some Noise (2013)
- Wassail (2015)

=== Solo albums ===
- Wild River (2004)
- Door One (2022)

=== With Louis Philippe ===
- Jackie Girl (1996)
- Azure (1998)
- A Kiss in the Funhouse (1999)
- My Favourite Part of You (2003)
- The Wonder of it All (2004)
- Live (2007)

=== With Martin Orford ===
- The Old Road (songs "Ray of Hope" "Endgame") (2008)

=== With The Tangent ===
- Le Sacre du Travail (2013)
- L'Etagère du Travail (2013)

=== With Dave Kerzner ===
- New World (song "New World") (2014)

=== With The Charlatans ===
- Modern Nature (song "Walk with Me") (2015)

=== With Judy Dyble ===
- Between a Breath and a Breath (2020)

=== With Downes Braide Association ===
- Live in England (2019)
- Halcyon Hymns (2021)

=== Other projects ===
- Spectral Mornings (lyrics, flute and vocals) (2015) – along with Nick Beggs, Rob Reed, Nick D'Virgilio, Christina Booth and Steve Hackett.
