= Greenbelt Festival =

British arts festival founded in 1974

Coordinates: 52.4205°N 0.6827°W

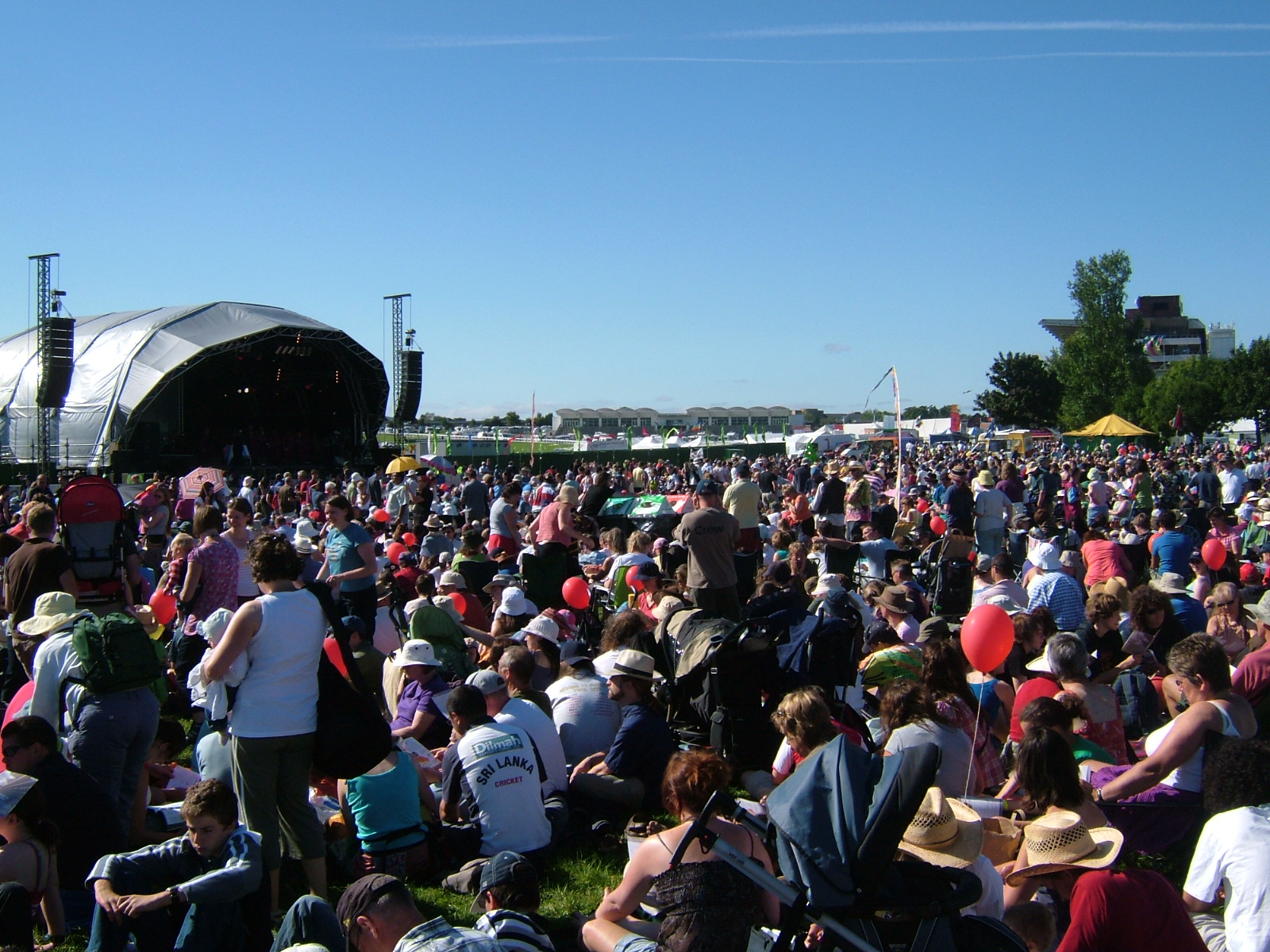
- Mainstage at Greenbelt 2007
- Genre: Mixed
- Dates: August Bank Holiday weekend (Weekend of the last Monday in August)
- Locations: Prospect Farm Charsfield (1974); Odell Castle (1975–1981); Knebworth House (1982–1983); Castle Ashby (1984–1992); Deene Park (1993–1998); Cheltenham Racecourse (1999–2013); Boughton House (2014–2026)
- Years active: 1974–present
- Website: Greenbelt.org.uk

Greenbelt Festival is a festival of arts, faith and justice held annually in England since 1974. Greenbelt has grown out of an evangelical Christian music festival with an audience of 1,500 young people into its current form, a more inclusive festival attended at its peak around 2010 by around 20,000, including Christians and those from other faiths.

The festival regularly attracts the biggest names of Christian music and many mainstream musicians. Those that have played the festival in the past include both new and established musicians, mostly playing rock, folk and pop music. This list includes The Alarm, U2, Moby, Charlie Peacock, Cliff Richard, Ed Sheeran, Martyn Joseph, Steve Taylor, Midnight Oil, Amy Grant, Kevin Max, Lambchop, Goldie, Jamelia, After the Fire, The Proclaimers, Daniel Bedingfield, Eden Burning, Duke Special, Athlete and Sixpence None the Richer.

Greenbelt is also a venue for teaching and discussion about (but not exclusively within) the Christian faith, and has attracted number of Christian speakers, including Rowan Williams (the former Archbishop of Canterbury) who is currently the festival's patron. However, the festival also welcomes anyone who the organisers believe 'speaks for justice', and has had Anita Roddick, Peter Tatchell, Bill Drummond, and Billy Bragg sharing their thoughts.

More recently with its links to the NGO Christian Aid, Greenbelt has become heavily involved in campaigns for trade justice. The festival was one of the main catalysts for the huge Jubilee 2000 movement. Greenbelt is also a Christian showcase for performing arts, visual arts and alternative worship.

== History ==
Greenbelt is a nomadic festival which has so far been held at seven different locations in England. While the venue has changed, the core event has remained the same: a celebration of faith, justice and arts with a particular Christian perspective.

The first Greenbelt Festival was held on a pig farm just outside the village of Charsfield near Woodbridge, Suffolk over the August 1974 bank holiday weekend, with early organisers including Jim Palosaari, Kenneth Frampton, and James Holloway. Local fears concerning the behaviour of festival attendees in the weeks running up to the event led to the cancellation of police leave in Suffolk, and reports of some people barricading themselves into their houses. These fears proved to be unfounded, but the festival did not return to the venue.

Between 1975 and 1981 the festival was held in the grounds of Odell Castle in Bedfordshire. Cliff Richard was invited to play the festival multiple times, finally agreeing to do so for the first time in 1979 after organisers agreed he could play his secular songs as well as worship music. In 1981 U2 made an unannounced appearance and played a 20 minute set, to the surprise of attendees.

The largest audiences for Greenbelt were during its two-year stay at Knebworth Park in Hertfordshire, 1982 and 1983. 1984 saw Greenbelt move to one of its longest-serving homes, Castle Ashby, Northamptonshire. While at Castle Ashby, Greenbelt began the practice of adopting an annual theme for the festival. Artists are encouraged to draw from the theme where possible.

Originally the 1992 festival was expected to be held at a new, permanent home on a farm a few miles away in Church Stowe. Greenbelt had finances in place to purchase the site, but met strong resistance from local residents. The plans collapsed and the festival returned to Castle Ashby one last time.

From 1993 to 1998 Greenbelt's home was the grounds of Deene Park, Northamptonshire. Putting the plan to purchase a permanent site on hold, Greenbelt instead negotiated with Deene Park's owner and invested in infrastructure improvements to this temporary site instead.

Following a downturn in audience figures and rising production costs, Greenbelt faced up to the inevitable in 1998: it was no longer financially viable to continue using the Deene Park site. A bold plan was devised. The 1998 event was pitched as the "last Greenbelt of its kind", with two festivals planned for 1999: a youth-oriented event "Freestate" in partnership with Spring Harvest to be held the August Bank Holiday weekend and a more family-oriented "Greenbelt" to be held over the last weekend in July at Cheltenham Racecourse.

In early 1999 plans for Freestate collapsed and its embryonic programme was hastily rolled into the Greenbelt planned for Cheltenham. The 1999 Greenbelt Festival took place at Cheltenham but saw the lowest audiences since the 1970s. It remains the only Greenbelt to have taken place other than on an August Bank Holiday weekend.

Greenbelt emerged from its financial difficulties in the early 2000s with ever-increasing audiences for festivals held at Cheltenham. In its last years at Cheltenham, although audiences were beginning to fall, they were over 20,000, comparable in numbers to those of its "glory days" in the early 1980s. The 2013 event featured multiple calls for Christian leaders to "stop being hypocritical" about homosexuality. Baptist minister Steve Chalke described how a gay friend became "an alcoholic, drug-dependent, and suicidal" due to homophobic abuse from an Evangelical church, while speakers including Clare Balding, Richard Coles, and Mark Oakley talked openly about their sexuality at the festival.

In 2014 Greenbelt moved to Boughton House, Northamptonshire, due to the planned redevelopment of Cheltenham Racecourse, as well as part of the site being unusable after severe weather during the 2012 festival caused flash flooding across parts of the racecourse. Since the move the festival has been scaled back after a drop in numbers and possibly due to the related loss of finances.

At the 2022 festival, Greenbelt announced that from 2023 they would bring the start and end dates forward to coincide with the festival's 50th anniversary. Greenbelt 2023 began with festivalgoers gathering on Thursday 24th and programming running from the morning of Friday 25th to Sunday 27th, instead of Friday evening to Monday evening. The 2024 festival will follow the same pattern of dates running from 22 to 25 August 2024.

The 2025 festival ran from 21-24 August 2025, with headliners including Nadine Shah and Kate Rusby. In September 2025, the organisers announced that Greenbelt would be leaving the Boughton House site after the 2026 festival, and looking for a new site. It was later announced that due to this ongoing process, there would be no Greenbelt festival in 2027.

Although there is constant tension between its faith-based origins and a more exploratory attitude to engaging with the world, the perspective of the festival remains one rooted in the Christian tradition, and drawing Christian music lovers.

== Organisation ==
Greenbelt is a registered charity and incorporated at Companies House. It is overseen by a board of trustees/directors who are responsible for its governance. A small staff team is supplemented by a large base of volunteers and a number of subcontractors.

== Locations, themes and contributors ==
Festival	Date, venue and theme	Contributors included:
GB01	23–26 August 1974	Headliners (Parchment, Sheep, Malcolm and Alwyn, Aleksander John, All Things New, Garth Hewitt, Kevin Gould, After the Fire) - Others (Really Free Band, Narnia, Penryn Jinx, Liberation Suite, Stewart Henderson, Lonesome Stone, Fish Company, George Duffin, John Peck, Jack Filby, Eric Delve, The Living Stones, Cornerstone, Truth Trinity, Steve Turner, 11.59)
GB01	Prospect Farm, Suffolk	Headliners (Parchment, Sheep, Malcolm and Alwyn, Aleksander John, All Things New, Garth Hewitt, Kevin Gould, After the Fire) - Others (Really Free Band, Narnia, Penryn Jinx, Liberation Suite, Stewart Henderson, Lonesome Stone, Fish Company, George Duffin, John Peck, Jack Filby, Eric Delve, The Living Stones, Cornerstone, Truth Trinity, Steve Turner, 11.59)
GB02	August 1975	After the Fire, Arnion, All Things New, Liberation Suite, Fish Co, Patrick Sookhdeo, Jean Darnell, Stewart Henderson, Alexander John, Garth Hewitt. A family service led by Patrick Sookhdeo. Feature film Quo Vardis.
GB02	Odell Castle, Bedfordshire	After the Fire, Arnion, All Things New, Liberation Suite, Fish Co, Patrick Sookhdeo, Jean Darnell, Stewart Henderson, Alexander John, Garth Hewitt. A family service led by Patrick Sookhdeo. Feature film Quo Vardis.
GB03	August 1976	Randy Matthews, Bryn Haworth Band, After the Fire with Ishmael, Mighty Flyers, Chuck Girard, Honeytree, Fish Co, Garth Hewitt, Graham Kendrick, Adrian Snell, Paul Burbridge & Murray Watts, John Peck, Graham Cray, Movement Banned
GB03	Odell Castle	Randy Matthews, Bryn Haworth Band, After the Fire with Ishmael, Mighty Flyers, Chuck Girard, Honeytree, Fish Co, Garth Hewitt, Graham Kendrick, Adrian Snell, Paul Burbridge & Murray Watts, John Peck, Graham Cray, Movement Banned
GB04	August 1977	All Saints Star Band, Alwyn Wall band, Masterpeace, Nutshell, Kenny Marks, John Pantry, Graham Cray, John Peck, Bill Mason, Wellies, Thin Ice, Power Take Off (PTO)
GB04	Odell Castle	All Saints Star Band, Alwyn Wall band, Masterpeace, Nutshell, Kenny Marks, John Pantry, Graham Cray, John Peck, Bill Mason, Wellies, Thin Ice, Power Take Off (PTO)
GB05	August 1978	Ishmael United, Bryn Haworth, Jessy Dixon, Garth Hewitt, Adrian Snell, Rodney Corder, Giantkiller, Fish Co, Parchment, John Gladwin, Margaret Winfield, Graham Kendrick, Martin Evans, Malcolm Doney, Patrick Sookhdeo, Jim Punton, Riding Lights Theatre Co, Power Take Off (PTO)
GB05	Odell Castle	Ishmael United, Bryn Haworth, Jessy Dixon, Garth Hewitt, Adrian Snell, Rodney Corder, Giantkiller, Fish Co, Parchment, John Gladwin, Margaret Winfield, Graham Kendrick, Martin Evans, Malcolm Doney, Patrick Sookhdeo, Jim Punton, Riding Lights Theatre Co, Power Take Off (PTO)
GB06	August 1979	Meet Jesus Music, After the Fire, Cliff Richard, Bryn Haworth, The Fat Band, Randy Stonehill, Larry Norman, John Gladwin, Roy Castle, Margaret Winfield, Chris Aston, Martin Hallett, The Predators, Just The Job, Giantkiller, Solid Rock, Vatten
GB06	Odell Castle	Meet Jesus Music, After the Fire, Cliff Richard, Bryn Haworth, The Fat Band, Randy Stonehill, Larry Norman, John Gladwin, Roy Castle, Margaret Winfield, Chris Aston, Martin Hallett, The Predators, Just The Job, Giantkiller, Solid Rock, Vatten
GB07	August 1980	Adrian Snell, Famous Names, Larry Norman, Daniel Amos, Jessy Dixon, Beau MacDougall, Just The Job, Jerusalem, Masterpeace, David Porter, Nigel Goodwin, Simon Jenkins, Geoffrey Stevenson
GB07	Odell Castle	Adrian Snell, Famous Names, Larry Norman, Daniel Amos, Jessy Dixon, Beau MacDougall, Just The Job, Jerusalem, Masterpeace, David Porter, Nigel Goodwin, Simon Jenkins, Geoffrey Stevenson
GB08	August 1981	U2, Tense, Just the Job, The Stares, Crown Agent, Barry McGuire, Joe English Band featuring Bonnie Bramlett, Cliff Richard, Rick Parfitt, Phil Everly, Mike Reid, Pieces of Glass, Garth Hewitt and Network 3, Randy Stonehill, Jerusalem, Norman Barratt, Sheila Walsh, Mark Williamson, Sam Hughes, 100% Proof, Paul Field, Roger Sainsbury, Stephen Timms, Ron Sider, Jim Punton, David Watson, The Predators, Solid Rock
GB08	Odell Castle	U2, Tense, Just the Job, The Stares, Crown Agent, Barry McGuire, Joe English Band featuring Bonnie Bramlett, Cliff Richard, Rick Parfitt, Phil Everly, Mike Reid, Pieces of Glass, Garth Hewitt and Network 3, Randy Stonehill, Jerusalem, Norman Barratt, Sheila Walsh, Mark Williamson, Sam Hughes, 100% Proof, Paul Field, Roger Sainsbury, Stephen Timms, Ron Sider, Jim Punton, David Watson, The Predators, Solid Rock
GB09	August 1982	Noel Paul Stookey, Bryn Haworth, Adrian Snell, The Barratt Band, Rez Band, Servant, Andy Pratt, Talking Drums, Paradise, Maxine and the Majestics, Roger Forster, Calvin Seerveld, Jim Wallis, Patrick Sookhdeo
GB09	Knebworth Park, Hertfordshire	Noel Paul Stookey, Bryn Haworth, Adrian Snell, The Barratt Band, Rez Band, Servant, Andy Pratt, Talking Drums, Paradise, Maxine and the Majestics, Roger Forster, Calvin Seerveld, Jim Wallis, Patrick Sookhdeo
GB10	August 1983	100% Proof, Cliff Richard, Jessy Dixon, Mighty Clouds of Joy, Randy Stonehill, Sheila Walsh, Conquest
GB10	Knebworth Park	100% Proof, Cliff Richard, Jessy Dixon, Mighty Clouds of Joy, Randy Stonehill, Sheila Walsh, Conquest
GB11	22–27 August 1984	Garth Hewitt, The Larry Norman Band, Philip Bailey, Bruce Cockburn, Sheila Walsh, Leviticus
GB11	Castle Ashby, Northamptonshire	Garth Hewitt, The Larry Norman Band, Philip Bailey, Bruce Cockburn, Sheila Walsh, Leviticus
GB12	August 1985	Jerusalem, Deniece Williams, Philip Bailey, Steve Taylor, Leviticus,
GB12	Castle Ashby	Jerusalem, Deniece Williams, Philip Bailey, Steve Taylor, Leviticus,
GB13	August 1986	Bryn Haworth, David Grant, Deniece Williams, The Fat Band, Mike Peters, Blood & Fire, the Choir, Gordon Gano, Elaine Storkey
GB13	Castle Ashby	Bryn Haworth, David Grant, Deniece Williams, The Fat Band, Mike Peters, Blood & Fire, the Choir, Gordon Gano, Elaine Storkey
GB14	August 1987	The Alarm, Bruce Cockburn, Daniel Amos, Leviticus, Narsh, Steve Taylor, Sheila Walsh, Elaine Storkey, The Predators
GB14	Castle Ashby	The Alarm, Bruce Cockburn, Daniel Amos, Leviticus, Narsh, Steve Taylor, Sheila Walsh, Elaine Storkey, The Predators
GB15	August 1988	Martyn Joseph, Cliff Richard, Amy Grant, Runrig
GB15	Castle Ashby	Martyn Joseph, Cliff Richard, Amy Grant, Runrig
GB15	The Fifteen Year Special	Martyn Joseph, Cliff Richard, Amy Grant, Runrig
GB16	August 1989	Charlie Peacock, Ladysmith Black Mambazo, Sweet Honey in the Rock, Labi Siffre, Steve Taylor, Fat and Frantic, Eden Burning, Gary Hall and the Stormkeepers, Maggi Dawn, Sublime, Wobegone, Peter Case, Bruce Cockburn, One Bad Pig, Seventh Angel, Revolutionary Army of the Infant Jesus, The Hang, Elaine Storkey
GB16	Castle Ashby	Charlie Peacock, Ladysmith Black Mambazo, Sweet Honey in the Rock, Labi Siffre, Steve Taylor, Fat and Frantic, Eden Burning, Gary Hall and the Stormkeepers, Maggi Dawn, Sublime, Wobegone, Peter Case, Bruce Cockburn, One Bad Pig, Seventh Angel, Revolutionary Army of the Infant Jesus, The Hang, Elaine Storkey
GB16	Art and Soul	Charlie Peacock, Ladysmith Black Mambazo, Sweet Honey in the Rock, Labi Siffre, Steve Taylor, Fat and Frantic, Eden Burning, Gary Hall and the Stormkeepers, Maggi Dawn, Sublime, Wobegone, Peter Case, Bruce Cockburn, One Bad Pig, Seventh Angel, Revolutionary Army of the Infant Jesus, The Hang, Elaine Storkey
GB17	23–27 August 1990	Runrig, The Call, Deacon Blue, Russ Taff, Whitecross, Mike Peters, Fat and Frantic, River City People, Lies Damned Lies.
GB17	Castle Ashby	Runrig, The Call, Deacon Blue, Russ Taff, Whitecross, Mike Peters, Fat and Frantic, River City People, Lies Damned Lies.
GB17	Rumours of Glory	Runrig, The Call, Deacon Blue, Russ Taff, Whitecross, Mike Peters, Fat and Frantic, River City People, Lies Damned Lies.
GB18	22–26 August 1991	Galactic Cowboys, Chagall Guevara, Steve Harley, Sounds of Blackness, Amy Grant, River City People, Steeleye Span, Tintagel, The Pineapples, Michael W. Smith, This Picture
GB18	Castle Ashby	Galactic Cowboys, Chagall Guevara, Steve Harley, Sounds of Blackness, Amy Grant, River City People, Steeleye Span, Tintagel, The Pineapples, Michael W. Smith, This Picture
GB18	Wrestling with Angels	Galactic Cowboys, Chagall Guevara, Steve Harley, Sounds of Blackness, Amy Grant, River City People, Steeleye Span, Tintagel, The Pineapples, Michael W. Smith, This Picture
GB19	27–31 August 1992	Nine O'Clock Service, Bruce Cockburn, Runrig, Bob Geldof and the Happy Clubsters, Martyn Joseph
GB19	Castle Ashby	Nine O'Clock Service, Bruce Cockburn, Runrig, Bob Geldof and the Happy Clubsters, Martyn Joseph
GB19	Journeys of the heart	Nine O'Clock Service, Bruce Cockburn, Runrig, Bob Geldof and the Happy Clubsters, Martyn Joseph
GB20	26–30 August 1993	T-Bone, The Prayer Chain, Magnum, James Taylor Quartet, Incognito, Herbie Armstrong, D'Influence, Iain Archer, Tom Sine, James Jones, Tom Wright, Gerard Hughes, Pete Ward, Stewart Henderson, Nigel Forde,
GB20	Deene Park, Northamptonshire	T-Bone, The Prayer Chain, Magnum, James Taylor Quartet, Incognito, Herbie Armstrong, D'Influence, Iain Archer, Tom Sine, James Jones, Tom Wright, Gerard Hughes, Pete Ward, Stewart Henderson, Nigel Forde,
GB20	Field of Dreams	T-Bone, The Prayer Chain, Magnum, James Taylor Quartet, Incognito, Herbie Armstrong, D'Influence, Iain Archer, Tom Sine, James Jones, Tom Wright, Gerard Hughes, Pete Ward, Stewart Henderson, Nigel Forde,
GB21	25–29 August 1994	Powerhouse Choir, The Proclaimers, Steve Taylor, Midnight Oil Tom Robinson, Samantha Fox,
GB21	Deene Park	Powerhouse Choir, The Proclaimers, Steve Taylor, Midnight Oil Tom Robinson, Samantha Fox,
GB21	Roots, Rhythm and Redemption	Powerhouse Choir, The Proclaimers, Steve Taylor, Midnight Oil Tom Robinson, Samantha Fox,
GB22	24–28 August 1995	Moby, Bruce Cockburn, Corduroy, Credit to the Nation, Disraeli Gears, Doo The Moog, Pray For Rain, Newsboys, Quick and the Dead, Frank Chikane, Gustavo Parajón, Dave Tomlinson, Lavinia Byrne, Jo Ind, Joy Carroll
GB22	Deene Park	Moby, Bruce Cockburn, Corduroy, Credit to the Nation, Disraeli Gears, Doo The Moog, Pray For Rain, Newsboys, Quick and the Dead, Frank Chikane, Gustavo Parajón, Dave Tomlinson, Lavinia Byrne, Jo Ind, Joy Carroll
GB22	Can these dry bones dance?	Moby, Bruce Cockburn, Corduroy, Credit to the Nation, Disraeli Gears, Doo The Moog, Pray For Rain, Newsboys, Quick and the Dead, Frank Chikane, Gustavo Parajón, Dave Tomlinson, Lavinia Byrne, Jo Ind, Joy Carroll
GB23	22–26 August 1996	Dakoda Motor Co., Steven Curtis Chapman, Ricky Ross, Moby, Brian Kennedy (singer), Eve & The Garden
GB23	Deene Park	Dakoda Motor Co., Steven Curtis Chapman, Ricky Ross, Moby, Brian Kennedy (singer), Eve & The Garden
GB23	Windows on wild heaven	Dakoda Motor Co., Steven Curtis Chapman, Ricky Ross, Moby, Brian Kennedy (singer), Eve & The Garden
GB24	21–25 August 1997	Vigilantes of Love, Lamb, Iona, Sneaker Pimps, The Choir, Martyn Joseph
GB24	Deene Park	Vigilantes of Love, Lamb, Iona, Sneaker Pimps, The Choir, Martyn Joseph
GB24	Divine Comedy	Vigilantes of Love, Lamb, Iona, Sneaker Pimps, The Choir, Martyn Joseph
GB25	27–31 August 1998	Headliners Jars of Clay, All Star United, Carleen Anderson, Delirious?, Fat and Frantic
GB25	Deene Park	Headliners Jars of Clay, All Star United, Carleen Anderson, Delirious?, Fat and Frantic
GB25	The last of its kind	Headliners Jars of Clay, All Star United, Carleen Anderson, Delirious?, Fat and Frantic
GB26	29 July - 1 August 1999	Bruce Cockburn, Vigilantes of Love, Blind Boys of Alabama, Asian Dub Foundation, Martyn Joseph, Rick Wakeman
GB26	Cheltenham Racecourse, Gloucestershire	Bruce Cockburn, Vigilantes of Love, Blind Boys of Alabama, Asian Dub Foundation, Martyn Joseph, Rick Wakeman
GB26	Deeper and Wider	Bruce Cockburn, Vigilantes of Love, Blind Boys of Alabama, Asian Dub Foundation, Martyn Joseph, Rick Wakeman
GB27	25–28 August 2000	Phatfish, Dum Dums, Joan Armatrading, Mal Pope, Tom Robinson with Martyn Joseph
GB27	Cheltenham Racecourse	Phatfish, Dum Dums, Joan Armatrading, Mal Pope, Tom Robinson with Martyn Joseph
GB27	heaven@earth.com	Phatfish, Dum Dums, Joan Armatrading, Mal Pope, Tom Robinson with Martyn Joseph
GB28	24–27 August 2001	Vigilantes of Love, Dum Dums, Eddi Reader, Courtney Pine, Brian Houston, Martyn Joseph, Sarah Masen, Kato, Jessy Dixon, Kendall Payne, Emmaus, Ben Castle, BottleRockit, Airstar, Steve Lawson, Bell Jar
GB28	Cheltenham Racecourse	Vigilantes of Love, Dum Dums, Eddi Reader, Courtney Pine, Brian Houston, Martyn Joseph, Sarah Masen, Kato, Jessy Dixon, Kendall Payne, Emmaus, Ben Castle, BottleRockit, Airstar, Steve Lawson, Bell Jar
GB28	Eternal Echoes	Vigilantes of Love, Dum Dums, Eddi Reader, Courtney Pine, Brian Houston, Martyn Joseph, Sarah Masen, Kato, Jessy Dixon, Kendall Payne, Emmaus, Ben Castle, BottleRockit, Airstar, Steve Lawson, Bell Jar
GB29	23–26 August 2002	Over the Rhine, Jazz Jamaica, Delirious?, Faith Folk & Anarchy, Steve Apirana, Lies Damned Lies, Ben Okafor, Steve Lawson
GB29	Cheltenham Racecourse	Over the Rhine, Jazz Jamaica, Delirious?, Faith Folk & Anarchy, Steve Apirana, Lies Damned Lies, Ben Okafor, Steve Lawson
GB29	Kiss of Life	Over the Rhine, Jazz Jamaica, Delirious?, Faith Folk & Anarchy, Steve Apirana, Lies Damned Lies, Ben Okafor, Steve Lawson
GB30	22–25 August 2003	The Polyphonic Spree, Kate Rusby, Umoja, The Tribe, Billy Bragg, Duke Special, Aqualung, Eden Burning, Boo Hewerdine, Kato, Brian Houston, Quench (band)
GB30	Cheltenham Racecourse	The Polyphonic Spree, Kate Rusby, Umoja, The Tribe, Billy Bragg, Duke Special, Aqualung, Eden Burning, Boo Hewerdine, Kato, Brian Houston, Quench (band)
GB30	Diving for Pearls	The Polyphonic Spree, Kate Rusby, Umoja, The Tribe, Billy Bragg, Duke Special, Aqualung, Eden Burning, Boo Hewerdine, Kato, Brian Houston, Quench (band)
GB31	27–30 August 2004	Lambchop, Delirious?, Denys Baptiste, Jamelia, After The Fire, Rob Newman, Rowan Williams
GB31	Cheltenham Racecourse	Lambchop, Delirious?, Denys Baptiste, Jamelia, After The Fire, Rob Newman, Rowan Williams
GB31	Freedom Bound	Lambchop, Delirious?, Denys Baptiste, Jamelia, After The Fire, Rob Newman, Rowan Williams
GB32	26–29 August 2005	Iain Archer, Estelle, The Proclaimers, Jazz Jamaica, Corrine Bailey Rae, Ricky Ross, Juliet Turner, Daby Touré, Beth Rowley, Gilles Peterson, Emiliana Torrini, Kendall Payne, Carleen Anderson, Elaine Storkey
GB32	Cheltenham Racecourse	Iain Archer, Estelle, The Proclaimers, Jazz Jamaica, Corrine Bailey Rae, Ricky Ross, Juliet Turner, Daby Touré, Beth Rowley, Gilles Peterson, Emiliana Torrini, Kendall Payne, Carleen Anderson, Elaine Storkey
GB32	Tree of Life	Iain Archer, Estelle, The Proclaimers, Jazz Jamaica, Corrine Bailey Rae, Ricky Ross, Juliet Turner, Daby Touré, Beth Rowley, Gilles Peterson, Emiliana Torrini, Kendall Payne, Carleen Anderson, Elaine Storkey
GB33	25–28 August 2006	Maria McKee, Daniel Bedingfield, My Morning Jacket, Michael Franti and Spearhead, Dave Andrews, Martyn Joseph, This Beautiful Republic
GB33	Cheltenham Racecourse	Maria McKee, Daniel Bedingfield, My Morning Jacket, Michael Franti and Spearhead, Dave Andrews, Martyn Joseph, This Beautiful Republic
GB33	Redemption Songs	Maria McKee, Daniel Bedingfield, My Morning Jacket, Michael Franti and Spearhead, Dave Andrews, Martyn Joseph, This Beautiful Republic
GB34	24–27 August 2007	Billy Bragg, Kanda Bongo Man, Coldcut, Over the Rhine, John Tavener, Delirious?, Rebecca Worthley, Duke Special, Denison Witmer, Chas & Dave, Aqualung, Matt Redman
GB34	Cheltenham Racecourse	Billy Bragg, Kanda Bongo Man, Coldcut, Over the Rhine, John Tavener, Delirious?, Rebecca Worthley, Duke Special, Denison Witmer, Chas & Dave, Aqualung, Matt Redman
GB34	Heaven in Ordinary	Billy Bragg, Kanda Bongo Man, Coldcut, Over the Rhine, John Tavener, Delirious?, Rebecca Worthley, Duke Special, Denison Witmer, Chas & Dave, Aqualung, Matt Redman
GB35	22–25 August 2008	Michael Franti and Spearhead, Seth Lakeman, Beth Rowley, José González, Fightstar, Jamie Catto, The Ian McMillan Orchestra, Iain Archer, Linchpin, Martyn Joseph, Starfield, Anathallo, MxPx, Juliet Turner, Matthew Herbert Big Band, Shlomo, Daby Touré, Brian Houston, Steve Lawson
GB35	Cheltenham Racecourse	Michael Franti and Spearhead, Seth Lakeman, Beth Rowley, José González, Fightstar, Jamie Catto, The Ian McMillan Orchestra, Iain Archer, Linchpin, Martyn Joseph, Starfield, Anathallo, MxPx, Juliet Turner, Matthew Herbert Big Band, Shlomo, Daby Touré, Brian Houston, Steve Lawson
GB35	Rising Sun	Michael Franti and Spearhead, Seth Lakeman, Beth Rowley, José González, Fightstar, Jamie Catto, The Ian McMillan Orchestra, Iain Archer, Linchpin, Martyn Joseph, Starfield, Anathallo, MxPx, Juliet Turner, Matthew Herbert Big Band, Shlomo, Daby Touré, Brian Houston, Steve Lawson
GB36	28–31 August 2009	Athlete, Bluetree, Bosh, Cenacle, Cornershop, Duke Special, Eddy Johns, Edwina Hayes, LZ7, Peggy Sue, Röyksopp, Sixpence None The Richer, Stu G, Sway, The Invisible, Tim Hughes
GB36	Cheltenham Racecourse	Athlete, Bluetree, Bosh, Cenacle, Cornershop, Duke Special, Eddy Johns, Edwina Hayes, LZ7, Peggy Sue, Röyksopp, Sixpence None The Richer, Stu G, Sway, The Invisible, Tim Hughes
GB36	Standing in the Long Now	Athlete, Bluetree, Bosh, Cenacle, Cornershop, Duke Special, Eddy Johns, Edwina Hayes, LZ7, Peggy Sue, Röyksopp, Sixpence None The Richer, Stu G, Sway, The Invisible, Tim Hughes
GB37	27–30 August 2010	Luke Leighfield, Beverley Knight, Courtney Pine, Shed Seven, London Community Gospel Choir, Ty, Jars of Clay, Foy Vance, Lou Rhodes, The King Blues, The Dodge Brothers, Ugly Duckling, Zic Zazou, Tom Hollander, Kester Brewin, John Bell, Richard Rohr, Maggi Dawn, Mark Yaconelli, Dave Andrews, Cole Moreton, Bruce Kent, Clare Short, John Smith, Jude Simpson, Andy Flannagan, Robin Ince, Martyn Joseph, Milton Jones, Peter Tatchell, Lucy Winkett, Mark Vernon, Stanley Hauerwas, Richard Chartres, Foy Vance, Roger McGough, David Morrissey, Simon Mayo, Linda Marlowe, Mark Kermode, Laurence Freeman, Abdul-Rehman Malik, Riding Lights Theatre Company, Andrew Rumsey, Tony Vino, Bobby Baker, Steve Lawson, Jason Barnett, Nick Park, Gareth Higgins, Cole Moreton, Janey Lee Grace, Richard Harries, Gustavo Parajon, Karen Ward, Pip Wilson, Eliacín Rosario-Cruz, Tom Sine, Francis Spufford, Jo Ind, Catherine Venn, Michael McDermott
GB37	Cheltenham Racecourse	
GB37	The Art of Looking Sideways	
GB38	26–29 August 2011	Martyn Joseph, Milton Jones, Iain Archer, Show of Hands, Kate Rusby, Idlewild, Get Cape, Wear Cape, Fly. Mavis Staples, Billy Bragg, Mark Thomas, Luke Leighfield, Folk On, The Unthanks, Harry Baker, Tony Vino, John Bell, Willie Williams, Methodist Modern Art Collection.
GB38	Cheltenham Racecourse	Martyn Joseph, Milton Jones, Iain Archer, Show of Hands, Kate Rusby, Idlewild, Get Cape, Wear Cape, Fly. Mavis Staples, Billy Bragg, Mark Thomas, Luke Leighfield, Folk On, The Unthanks, Harry Baker, Tony Vino, John Bell, Willie Williams, Methodist Modern Art Collection.
GB38	Dreams of Home	Martyn Joseph, Milton Jones, Iain Archer, Show of Hands, Kate Rusby, Idlewild, Get Cape, Wear Cape, Fly. Mavis Staples, Billy Bragg, Mark Thomas, Luke Leighfield, Folk On, The Unthanks, Harry Baker, Tony Vino, John Bell, Willie Williams, Methodist Modern Art Collection.
Greenbelt 2012	24–27 August 2012	Speech Debelle, Bruce Cockburn, The Proclaimers, Seth Lakeman, Bellowhead, The Imagined Village, Megson, Thomas Truax, Franz Nicolay, Frank Skinner, Asian Dub Foundation, Robin Ince, Diamuid McCulloch, Harry Baker, Folk On, Nitin Sawhney, Martyn Joseph, Shlomo, Rita Nakashima Brock and Rebecca Parker
Greenbelt 2012	Cheltenham Racecourse	Speech Debelle, Bruce Cockburn, The Proclaimers, Seth Lakeman, Bellowhead, The Imagined Village, Megson, Thomas Truax, Franz Nicolay, Frank Skinner, Asian Dub Foundation, Robin Ince, Diamuid McCulloch, Harry Baker, Folk On, Nitin Sawhney, Martyn Joseph, Shlomo, Rita Nakashima Brock and Rebecca Parker
Greenbelt 2012	Saving Paradise	Speech Debelle, Bruce Cockburn, The Proclaimers, Seth Lakeman, Bellowhead, The Imagined Village, Megson, Thomas Truax, Franz Nicolay, Frank Skinner, Asian Dub Foundation, Robin Ince, Diamuid McCulloch, Harry Baker, Folk On, Nitin Sawhney, Martyn Joseph, Shlomo, Rita Nakashima Brock and Rebecca Parker
Greenbelt 2013	23–26 August 2013	Amadou & Mariam, Black Rebel Motorcycle Club, Lemar, Duke Special, Eliza Carthy & Jim Moray, London Community Gospel Choir, Courtney Pine, Thea Gilmore, Graham Kendrick, Why?, Fat and Frantic, Barbara Brown Taylor, Dave Andrews, Jim Wallis, Eric Kaufmann, Clare Balding, Adrian Plass, Milton Jones, The Sunday Assembly, Folk On
Greenbelt 2013	Cheltenham Racecourse	Amadou & Mariam, Black Rebel Motorcycle Club, Lemar, Duke Special, Eliza Carthy & Jim Moray, London Community Gospel Choir, Courtney Pine, Thea Gilmore, Graham Kendrick, Why?, Fat and Frantic, Barbara Brown Taylor, Dave Andrews, Jim Wallis, Eric Kaufmann, Clare Balding, Adrian Plass, Milton Jones, The Sunday Assembly, Folk On
Greenbelt 2013	Life begins	Amadou & Mariam, Black Rebel Motorcycle Club, Lemar, Duke Special, Eliza Carthy & Jim Moray, London Community Gospel Choir, Courtney Pine, Thea Gilmore, Graham Kendrick, Why?, Fat and Frantic, Barbara Brown Taylor, Dave Andrews, Jim Wallis, Eric Kaufmann, Clare Balding, Adrian Plass, Milton Jones, The Sunday Assembly, Folk On
Greenbelt 2014	22–25 August 2014	Sinéad O'Connor, Stornoway, Tinariwen, Luke Sital-Singh, Gilles Peterson, Jahmene Douglas, Boo Hewerdine, Beth Rowley, Lau, Hackney Colliery Band, Bridie Jackson & The Arbour, Emily and The Woods, Gaggle, Samantha Crain, Wara, Winter Mountain, Jason Carter, Dizraeli and the Small Gods, Hobbit, Cathy Burton, Harp and a Monkey, Heather Hind, Levi Hummon, RM Hubbert, The Chaplins, The Cut Ups, Tiny Ruins, Ezio, Josephine and The Artizans, The Jonny Walker Band, Apirana Quartet, Benjamin Blower & The Army of the Broken Hearted, Fischy Music, Flute of Shame, Lotte Mullan, The Claze, Thumb, Vive, The Observatory, Jump Cannon Productions, Berkeley Ensemble, Harry Bird and the Rubber Wellies, Hope & Social, The Tombola Theory (with Ben Castle), The Old Plough Folk Club, Atlum Schema, Chris T-T & The Hoodrats, Ellie Rose, Flight Brigade, Folk On, Grace Petrie, Guvna B, Hannah Scott, Jasmine Kennedy, Jess Morgan, Luke Leighfield, Marcus Hummon, Martyn Joseph, Rory Butler, Yvonne Lyon, Stanley Odd, The Travelling Band, Clara Sanabras, Wednesday's Wolves, Harvey Brough
Greenbelt 2014	Boughton House, Northamptonshire	
Greenbelt 2014	Travelling Light	
Greenbelt 2015	28–31 August 2015	The Polyphonic Spree, The Unthanks, Duke Special, Under the Dark Cloth, Shlomo, Kiran Ahluwalia, Zara McFarlane, Josephine Scott Matthews, King Porter Stomp, Pascuala Ilabaca y Fauna, Martyn Joseph, Grace Petrie, Marcus Bonfanti, This Is The Kit, Bert Miller and the Animal Folk, Ciaran Lavery, Tom Butler, Worry Dolls, Burning Codes, Gaz Brookfield, CoCo and the Butterfields, Digitonal, King Kool The Revolutionary Army of the Infant Jesus, Marc O'Reilly, Sam Brookes, Thea Hopkins, Folk On, Beth Goudie, Boat To Row, Ella and the Blisters, New Portals, Miriam Jones, Matt Sellors, Andrew Howie, Homegrown Collective, Rosalind Peters, Adesuwa Bullen, Danni Nicholls, Fran Smith, The Fruitful Earth, Paul Bell, Speak Brother, Steph Macleod, The Coopers, Joni Fuller, Garth Hewitt, Paul Bell, Sophronie, Oldtime Nursery, Iain Archer, Project Jam Sandwich, LewRey, KARI, Sam Lee & Friends, Broken Brass Ensemble, Pearl Fish, 7PM Soundsystem, Double-0-Denim, Heather Wall, Kimarne Henry, DJ LUMA, Moon passion Flamenco Band
Greenbelt 2015	Boughton House	
Greenbelt 2015	The Bright Field	
Greenbelt 2016	26–29 August 2016	Beth Rowley, Mike Peters, Kitty, Daisy & Lewis, Hot 8 Brass Band, Nahko & Medicine for the People, Hope & Social's 'A Band Anyone Can Join', Elaine Storkey, DJ LUMA, Gaz Brookfield, The Rubber Wellies, Lola Young
Greenbelt 2016	Boughton House	Beth Rowley, Mike Peters, Kitty, Daisy & Lewis, Hot 8 Brass Band, Nahko & Medicine for the People, Hope & Social's 'A Band Anyone Can Join', Elaine Storkey, DJ LUMA, Gaz Brookfield, The Rubber Wellies, Lola Young
Greenbelt 2016	Silent Stars	Beth Rowley, Mike Peters, Kitty, Daisy & Lewis, Hot 8 Brass Band, Nahko & Medicine for the People, Hope & Social's 'A Band Anyone Can Join', Elaine Storkey, DJ LUMA, Gaz Brookfield, The Rubber Wellies, Lola Young
Greenbelt 2017	25–28 August 2017	Newton Faulkner, Kate Rusby, Luke Sital-Singh, Wildwood Kin, Sound of the Sirens, Jess Morgan, Martyn Joseph, Joanne Shaw Taylor, Clean Cut Kid, CC Smugglers, Dan Donovan, King Porter Stomp, Lee Bains III & the Glory Fires, Jasmine Kennedy, The Rubber Wellies, Will Varley, Jasper in the Company of Others, Zoe Lyons, Paul Kerensa
Greenbelt 2017	Boughton House	Newton Faulkner, Kate Rusby, Luke Sital-Singh, Wildwood Kin, Sound of the Sirens, Jess Morgan, Martyn Joseph, Joanne Shaw Taylor, Clean Cut Kid, CC Smugglers, Dan Donovan, King Porter Stomp, Lee Bains III & the Glory Fires, Jasmine Kennedy, The Rubber Wellies, Will Varley, Jasper in the Company of Others, Zoe Lyons, Paul Kerensa
Greenbelt 2017	M̶e̶, Y̶o̶u̶, Us - The Common Good	Newton Faulkner, Kate Rusby, Luke Sital-Singh, Wildwood Kin, Sound of the Sirens, Jess Morgan, Martyn Joseph, Joanne Shaw Taylor, Clean Cut Kid, CC Smugglers, Dan Donovan, King Porter Stomp, Lee Bains III & the Glory Fires, Jasmine Kennedy, The Rubber Wellies, Will Varley, Jasper in the Company of Others, Zoe Lyons, Paul Kerensa
Greenbelt 2018	24–27 August 2018	Pussy Riot, We Are Scientists, Ozomalti, Ibibio Sound Machine, I'm With Her, Duke Special, Lowkey, Lewis Watson, The Reverend Peyton's Big Damn Band, CC Smugglers, Lee Bains III & The Glory Fires, Pierce Brothers, L.A. Salami, Grace Petrie, Martyn Joseph, Zach Said, Lots Holloway, Xylaroo, The Welcome Wagon, Jack Monroe, Michael Eavis, Kate Raworth, Carol Ann Duffy, Jon McGregor, Harry Baker, Jojo Mehta, Simon Mayo, Vicky Beeching, Lauri Love, Dawn Foster, Robyn Travis, Jonathan Bartley, Eve Poole, Broderick Greer, Lynne Segal, Rants n Bants, Winnie Varghese, Anthony Reddie, Sam Wells, Anna Kessel, Matthew Morris, Paula Gooder, Peterson Toscano, Roman Krznaric, Stephen James Smith, Garth Hewitt, Flo & Joan, Harry & Chris, Tony Law, Bryony Kimmings, Alula Cyr, Milk Presents, Malak Mattar
Greenbelt 2018	Boughton House	
Greenbelt 2018	Acts of the Imagination	
Greenbelt 2019	23–26 August 2019	Russell Brand, Frank Turner, Lucy Spraggan, Fantastic Negrito, Gregory Alan Isakov, Brass Against, SOAK, Nakhane, Paul Mason, Nadia Bolz-Weber, Michael Leunig, Belarus Free Theatre, Extinction Rebellion, The Anti Fracking Nanas, Jamie Bartlett, Grace Blakeley, Kumi Naidoo, Danny Dorling, Safia Minney, Miata Fahnbulleh, Harry and Chris, Folk On, Fischy Music
Greenbelt 2019	Boughton House	Russell Brand, Frank Turner, Lucy Spraggan, Fantastic Negrito, Gregory Alan Isakov, Brass Against, SOAK, Nakhane, Paul Mason, Nadia Bolz-Weber, Michael Leunig, Belarus Free Theatre, Extinction Rebellion, The Anti Fracking Nanas, Jamie Bartlett, Grace Blakeley, Kumi Naidoo, Danny Dorling, Safia Minney, Miata Fahnbulleh, Harry and Chris, Folk On, Fischy Music
Greenbelt 2019	Wit and Wisdom	Russell Brand, Frank Turner, Lucy Spraggan, Fantastic Negrito, Gregory Alan Isakov, Brass Against, SOAK, Nakhane, Paul Mason, Nadia Bolz-Weber, Michael Leunig, Belarus Free Theatre, Extinction Rebellion, The Anti Fracking Nanas, Jamie Bartlett, Grace Blakeley, Kumi Naidoo, Danny Dorling, Safia Minney, Miata Fahnbulleh, Harry and Chris, Folk On, Fischy Music
Greenbelt 2020-2021	Wild at Heart / Wild at Home	Due to the COVID-19 pandemic, the 47th Greenbelt, "Wild at Heart" was postponed a year to 2021. A limited version of the festival took place online, entitled "Wild at Home". On May 4, 2021, it was announced that the festival would be cancelled for the second time in 2021 due to uncertainties over the pandemic. Instead there is to be a very scaled-back camping gathering, in the spirit of the first festival, called Prospect Farm.
Greenbelt 2022	26–29 August 2022	Kae Tempest, Jeremy Loops, The Magic Numbers, House Gospel Choir, Billie Marten, Hurray For The Riff Raff, Jake Isaac, Beans On Toast, Guvna B, Anaïs Mitchell, Wildwood Kin, Ben Caplan, Ron Artis II & The Truth, Ayanna Witter-Johnson, BCUC, Bonnie Greer, Richard Dawkins, Caroline Lucas, Reni Eddo-Lodge, Brian Eno, Simon Armitage, Angela Saini, Rowan Williams, Shaparak Khorsandi, Terry Alderton, Harry & Chris, The Young'uns, Thea Gilmore, Martyn Joseph, The Reminders
Greenbelt 2022	Boughton House	Kae Tempest, Jeremy Loops, The Magic Numbers, House Gospel Choir, Billie Marten, Hurray For The Riff Raff, Jake Isaac, Beans On Toast, Guvna B, Anaïs Mitchell, Wildwood Kin, Ben Caplan, Ron Artis II & The Truth, Ayanna Witter-Johnson, BCUC, Bonnie Greer, Richard Dawkins, Caroline Lucas, Reni Eddo-Lodge, Brian Eno, Simon Armitage, Angela Saini, Rowan Williams, Shaparak Khorsandi, Terry Alderton, Harry & Chris, The Young'uns, Thea Gilmore, Martyn Joseph, The Reminders
Greenbelt 2022	Wake Up	Kae Tempest, Jeremy Loops, The Magic Numbers, House Gospel Choir, Billie Marten, Hurray For The Riff Raff, Jake Isaac, Beans On Toast, Guvna B, Anaïs Mitchell, Wildwood Kin, Ben Caplan, Ron Artis II & The Truth, Ayanna Witter-Johnson, BCUC, Bonnie Greer, Richard Dawkins, Caroline Lucas, Reni Eddo-Lodge, Brian Eno, Simon Armitage, Angela Saini, Rowan Williams, Shaparak Khorsandi, Terry Alderton, Harry & Chris, The Young'uns, Thea Gilmore, Martyn Joseph, The Reminders
Greenbelt 2023	24–27 August 2023	Alasdair Beckett-King, All Our Money presented by Stan’s Cafe, Andrew Copson, "Andy Hunter, The Prayer", Angel Arutura, Animal Byproducts, Ann Pettifor, Attenborough and His Animals presented by Clownfish Theatre, Balaklava Blues, Bashar Murad, Beloved Sara Zaltash, Ben Okafor, BERRIES, Beth Singler, bigfatbig, Brian Eno, Bruce Cockburn, Carrie and David Grant, Casting Off presented by A Good Catch and Cluster Arts, Cat Clyde, Chali 2na, Claire Gilbert, Cole Arthur Riley, Daniel Munayer, Dave Andrews, Dave Tomlinson, David Dark, Duke Special, Elanor Moss, Elles Bailey, Elvis in Blue Hawaii presented by Spitz & Co, Eve Poole, Ezra Furman, Fat and Frantic, Fishermen’s Chapel Gospel Choir, Folk On, Fräulein, Fresh, Garth Hewitt, Gordon Brown, Grace Notes, Grace Petrie, Grief Moves: The Loss Project X The Fandangoe Kid, GUTTS, Harry & Chris, Harry Bird, Henry Raby, Holy Moly & the Crackers, House of El, Ida Mae, Indigo Girls, Jack Monroe, Jasmin O’Hara, Jaspreet Kaur, Joel McKerrow, John Bell, Jolyon Maugham, Josie Long, Justin Adams & Mohamed Errebbaa, K.O.G, Kapil Seshasayee, Kathryn Mannix, Laura Mvula, Lee Bains III, Lowkey, Luke Turner, Martin Shaw, Micha Frazer-Carroll, Milton Jones, Mouses, Muna Nassar, Naomi Kelly, Oh My God! It’s the Church, Paul Cookson, Philippa Zawe, Problem Patterns, Rianne Downey, Rick Dove, Roberto Martinez, Ru Callender, Rumba de Bodas, Ruth Pearce, Ruth Valerio, Sadia Azmat, Sambambo, Sekrit, Simon Sharpe, Siskin Green, Sophie Howe, Sorority Grrrls, Stefania Maurizi with Ewen MacAskill, Straight Girl, Sunetra Gupta, Suntou Susso, TAIZÉ, Tawiah, TC & The Groove Family, The Chosen Haram presented by Sadiq Ali, The Deep Blue, The Rabbitts, The Spirituals, Tim Farron, Wilderthorn, Yasmin Alibhai-Brown
Greenbelt 2023	Boughton House	
Greenbelt 2023	50th Anniversary - Artistry X Activism X Belief	
Greenbelt 2024	22-25 August 2024	Corrine Bailey Rae presents Black Rainbows, Bob Vylan, Dutty Moonshine Big Band, House Gospel Choir, The McCrary Sisters, Akram Abdulfattah, Antony Szmierek, DAM, Dizraeli, Elephant Sessions, Flamy Grant, Hamish Hawk, Leyla McCalla, London Afrobeat Collective, Martyn Joseph, Seckou Keita & The Homeland Band, Stornoway, Andrew Rumsey, Baila La Cumbria, Chris Read, Christina Alden & Alex Patterson, Gabi Garbutt, Granny's Attic, John Smith, Katherine Priddy, Lady Nade, Lleuwen Steffan, Luke Sital-Singh, Lunatraktors, Mal Pope, Megson, Nectar Woode, Ruth Lyon, Saied Silbak, Sam Redmore & The Tropical Soundclash Allstars, Sambambo, Siskin Green, SK Shlomo, Sylvan Weekends, Worldwide Welshman, Alien Chicks, Boom Boom Racoon, CHERYM, Daffodildos, Feeble Strength, Generation Feral, Genn, Gum Disease, I, Doris, Knitting Circle, Mouses, Play Dead, Toodles & The Hectic Pity, Ashley John-Baptiste, Ayla Lepine, Beth Singler, Brian Draper, Brian Eno, Brian McLaren, Brooke Prentis, Daoud Nassar, Darren McGarvey, Gail Bradbrook, Guvna B, Jarel Robinson-Brown, Jason Arday, Jaspreet Kaur, Joshua Virasami, Julie Siddiqi, Kate Bottley, Kate Raworth, Kester Brewin, Marie-Elsa Bragg, Michael Mansfield, Paul Powlesland, Paul Sinton-Hewitt, Pia Sinha, Rebecca Jane Morgan, Richard Rohr, Roman Krznaric, Sophie-Grace Chappell, Steve Chalke, Vanessa Nakate, Gecko, Harry Baker, Jenny Mitchell, Kirsty Taylor, Lady Unchained, Pádraig Ó Tuama, The Vandal Factory Podcast, Patrick Jones, Paul Cookson, Testament, Toby Campion, Vanessa Kisuule, Lynchpin Theatre, Leeds Studio, Justice In Motion, RougePlay, Samsam Bubbleman, Gandini Juggling, Murray Watts, David Benson, Ramshacklicious & Hijinx, Jon Long, Bethany Black, Dane Buckley, MC Mark Cram, Anastasia Chokuwamba, Loraine Mponela, Dolly Church, Grace Notes, Ooberfuse, Rachel Chaplin, Soul Sanctuary Gospel Choir, Taizé, David Benjamin Blower, Wilderthorn, Bobby Baker, Holly Slingsby, John Newling, Kate Genever, Lucy Wright
Greenbelt 2024	Boughton House	
Greenbelt 2024	Dream On	
Greenbelt 2025	21st - 24th August 2025	Adjoa Andoh, Annie & The Caldwells, Bab L'Bluz, Brian Eno, Jeremy Corbyn, Kate Rusby, K.O.G, Liz Carr, Nadine Shah, Patrick Grant, Sarah Corbett Craftivist in Residence, Amber Massie-Blomfield, Andrea Coomber, Beans On Toast, Benin International Musical, Beth Allison Barr, Beth Rowley, Bishop Rose Hudson-Wilkin, Crys Matthews*, Dara McAnulty, Dave Gunning*, Dougald Hine*, Draags, Duck Thieves, El Pony Pisador, Empathy Museum presents A Mile in My Shoes, Faithful Johannes and Neocia, Fanny Lumsden, Fatiha El-Ghorri, Foreign Affairs, Frankie Archer, Georgie Jones, Good Habits, Haleh Liza Gafori*, Harlot, Harry Baker, Held By Trees, Hot Squash, Hugh Mann, Infusion Physical Theatre presents Soothe, Jayne Manfredi, Jenny Goodman, Jock, John Philip Newell, Josh Garrels, Kallemi, Lamorna Ash*, Lande Hekt, Leena Norms, Little Moon, Lorna Goodison*, Lost Voice Guy, Luka Lesson*, Lyndsay Rush*, Maddie Morris, Marie Howe*, Marilynne Robinson*, Martyn Joseph with The Rising, Michael Mears presents The Mistake, Mike Berners-Lee, Motionshouse presents HENGE, Mya-Rose Craig, N'famady Kouyaté, No Fit State presents Bamboo, Pádraig Ó Tuama, Pif Paf presents Right To Play, Project Smok, Rachel Ho, Richard Jordan Productions & 512 present Jesus, Jane, Mother & Me, Sambambo, Semler, She Drew the Gun, Sophie Pavelle, Sorvina, Sound of the Sirens, Stan's Cafe presents The Many Lives of PET #1, Synergy Theatre presents Providers, The Longest Johns, The Twistettes, The Vandal Factory Podcast Live, The Wran, The XCERTS, Tim Winton*, Touki, Twat Union, Virginia's Wolves, Wolfgang Valbrun, Worklight Theatre presents It's The Economy, Stupid, wormboys *Appeared at the festival remotely via live broadcasting
Greenbelt 2025	Boughton House	
Greenbelt 2025	Hope In The Making	
Greenbelt 2026	27th - 30th August 2026	Arrested Development, The Proclaimers, BCUC, Fulu Miziki, Penguin Cafe, Martyn Joseph, Grace Petrie, Hope & Social, Crys Matthews, Dustbowl Revival, Charlotte Church, Cathy Newman, Robin Ince, Siskin Green, Sue Parfitt, Michael Sheen*, Jordan Stephens, Martin Shaw, Mina Smallman, Andy Squyres, Ann Pettifor, Belle Tindall-Riley, Ben Rawlence, Bill McKibben*, Blue Rose Code, CAPYAC, Cheer Up Luv, David Benjamin Blower, Desree, Dub Colossus, Fischy Music, Flamy Grant, Flat Moon, Folk On, Fred Apps, Gabi Garbutt, Generation Feral, Gecko, Guvna B, Harry Baker, Harry Bird, Joseph Tawadros, Junior Brother, Kayleigh Jones, Lee Bains, Lizzy Hardingham, Luke Wallace, Lucy Sixsmith, Maddie Thorp, Martha May & The Mondays, Mobeen Azhar, Pambele, Pete Moorey, Poco Drom, Rensoll, Rose Betts, RuMac, Sambambo, Sekrit, Serin, Shane Claiborne*, Shlomo & the GOB Orchestra, Sohan Kailey, Soul Food, Speit, St. Catherine’s Child, Stebee, Steve Baker and Liza B, TC & The Groove Family, Withered Hand, Xray Vez, Yakkie, Yaz Jenkins, Alys Williams presents The Lighthouse, Max Calaf and Lucas Ruiz presents REC.ON (struction), Levantes Dance Theatre presents HUG, Luisa Omielan presents God is a Woman: The Musical. *Appeared at the festival remotely via live broadcasting
Greenbelt 2026	Boughton House	
Greenbelt 2026	Let It All Go	

== Photo gallery ==
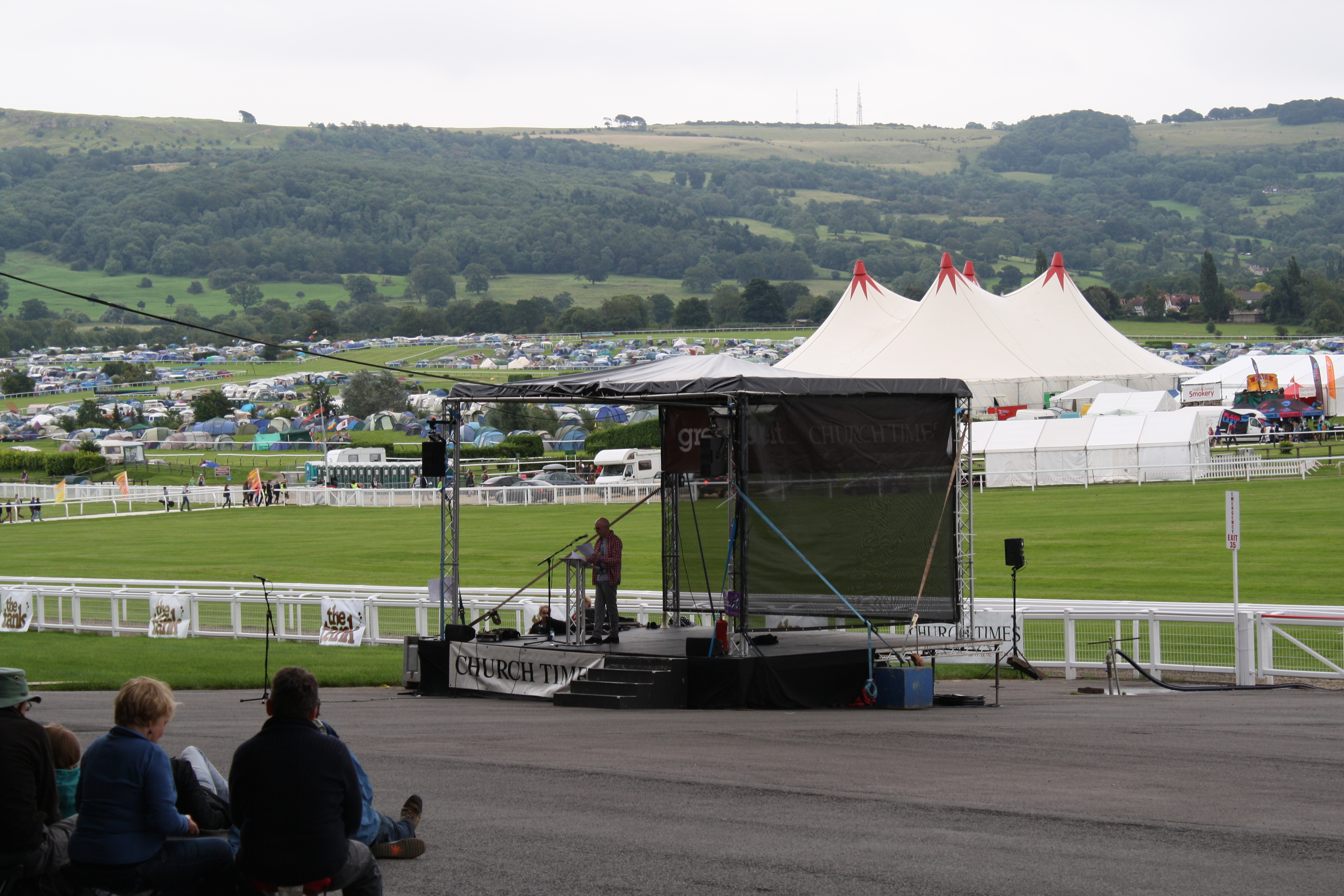
"Jerusalem" stage

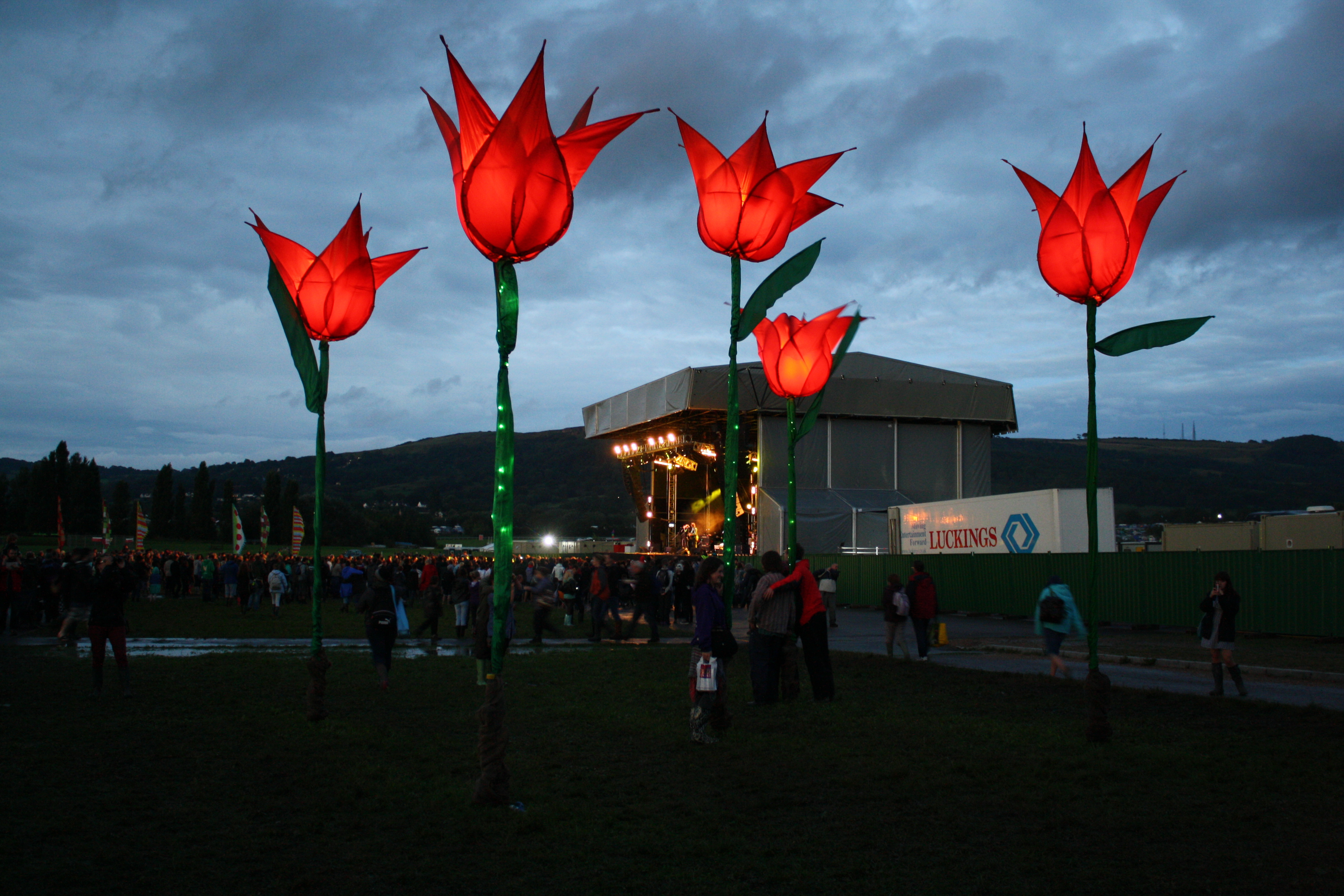
Flowers and "Main Stage"

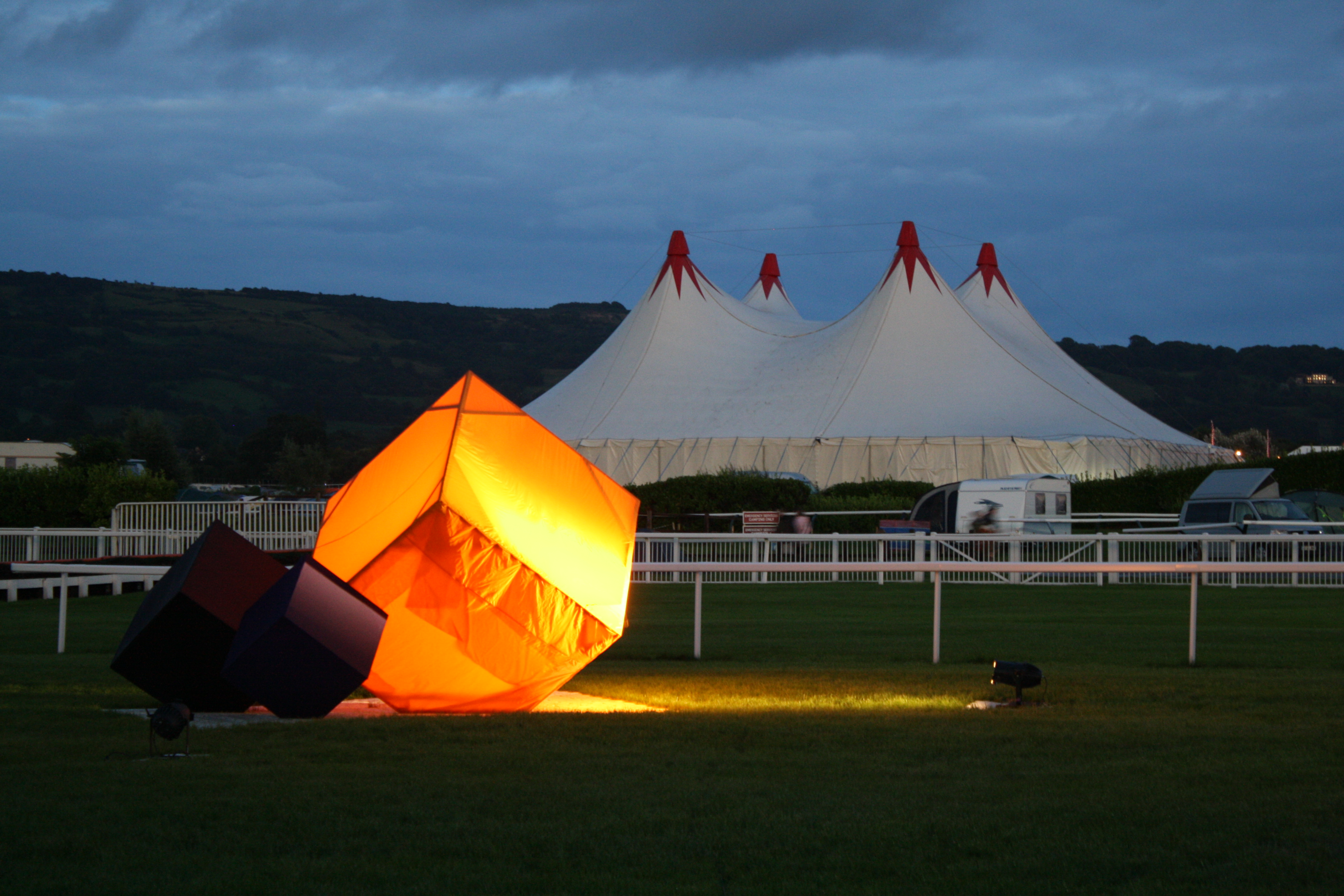
Symbol and "Big Top"

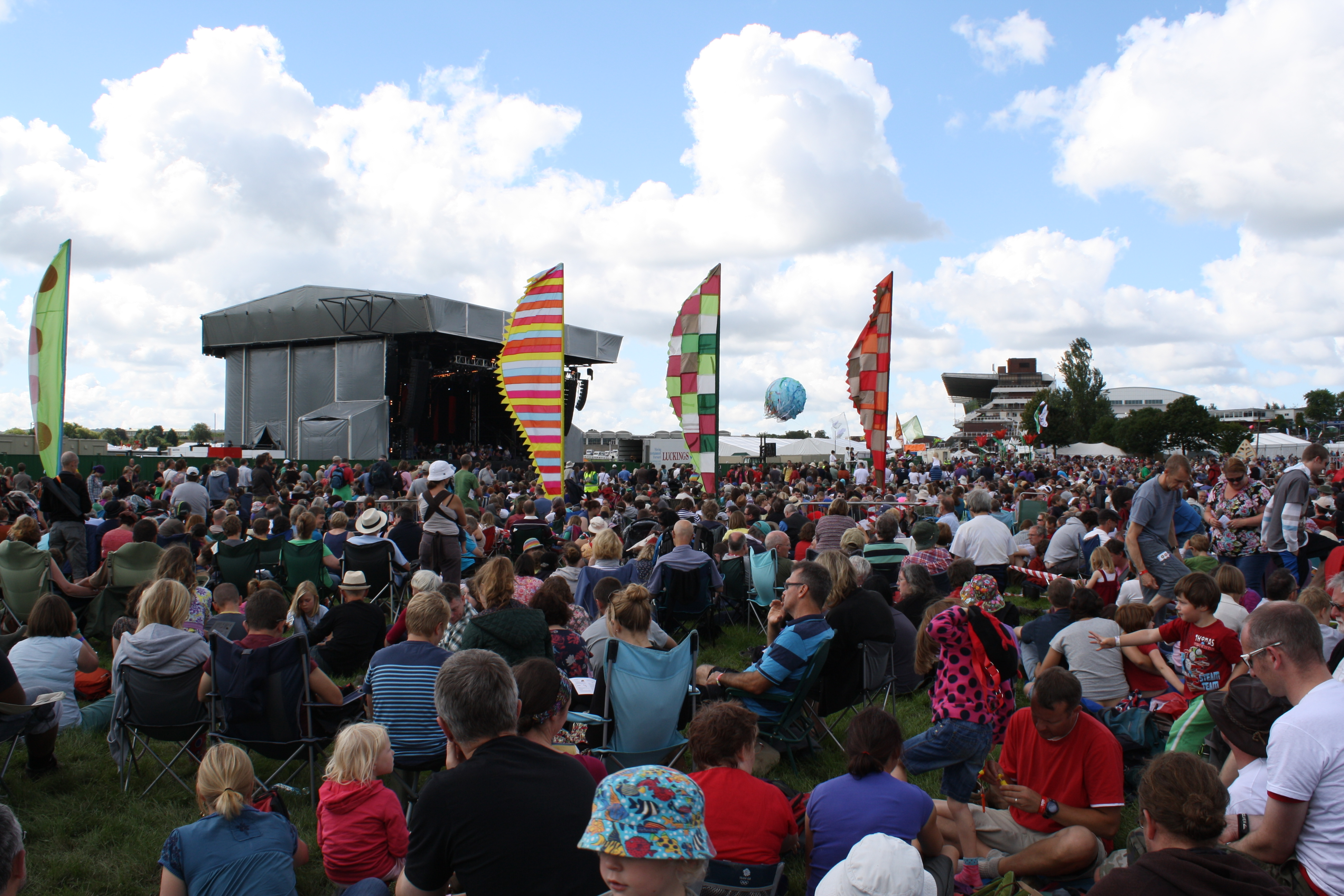
Communion Service

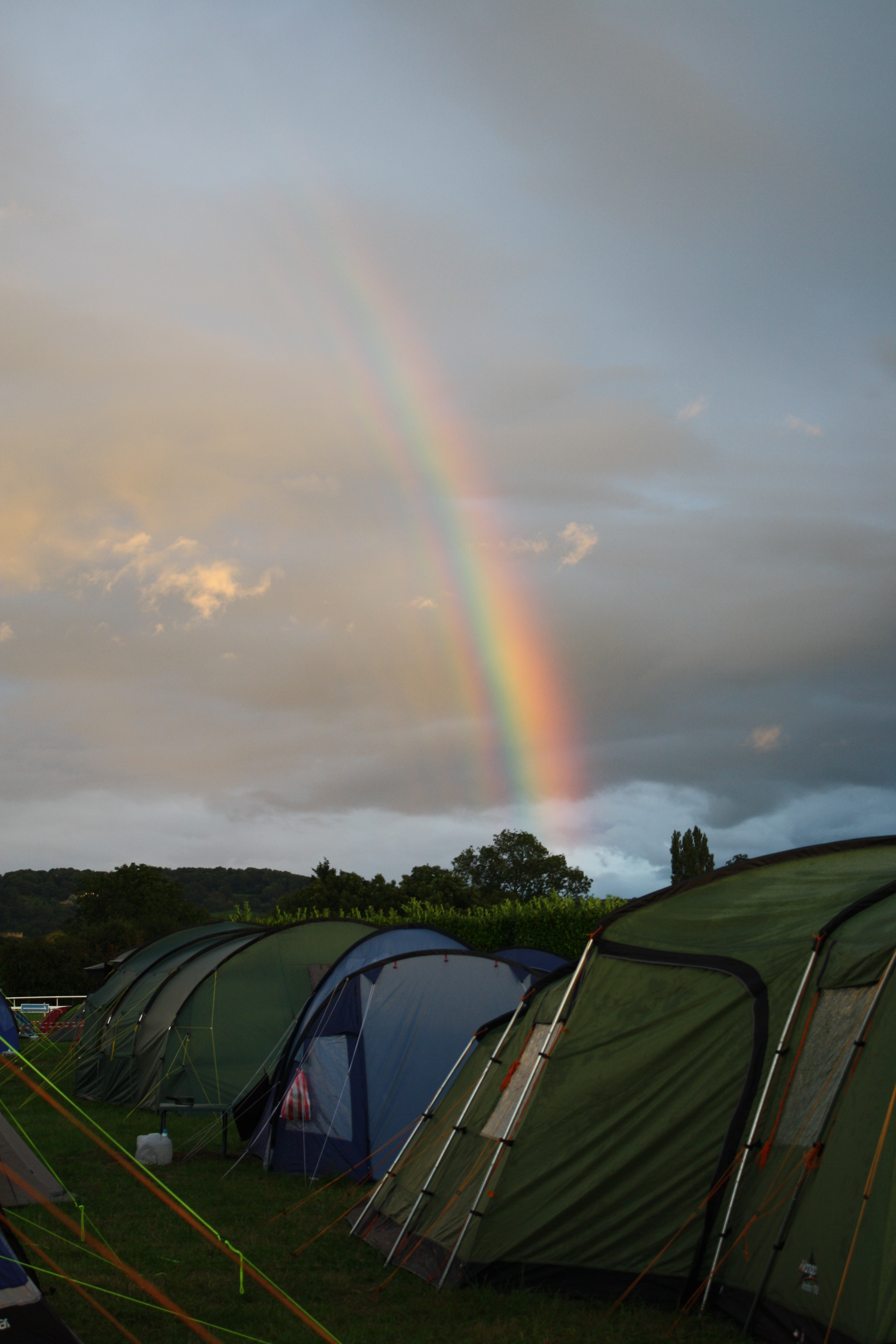
Rainbow over tents

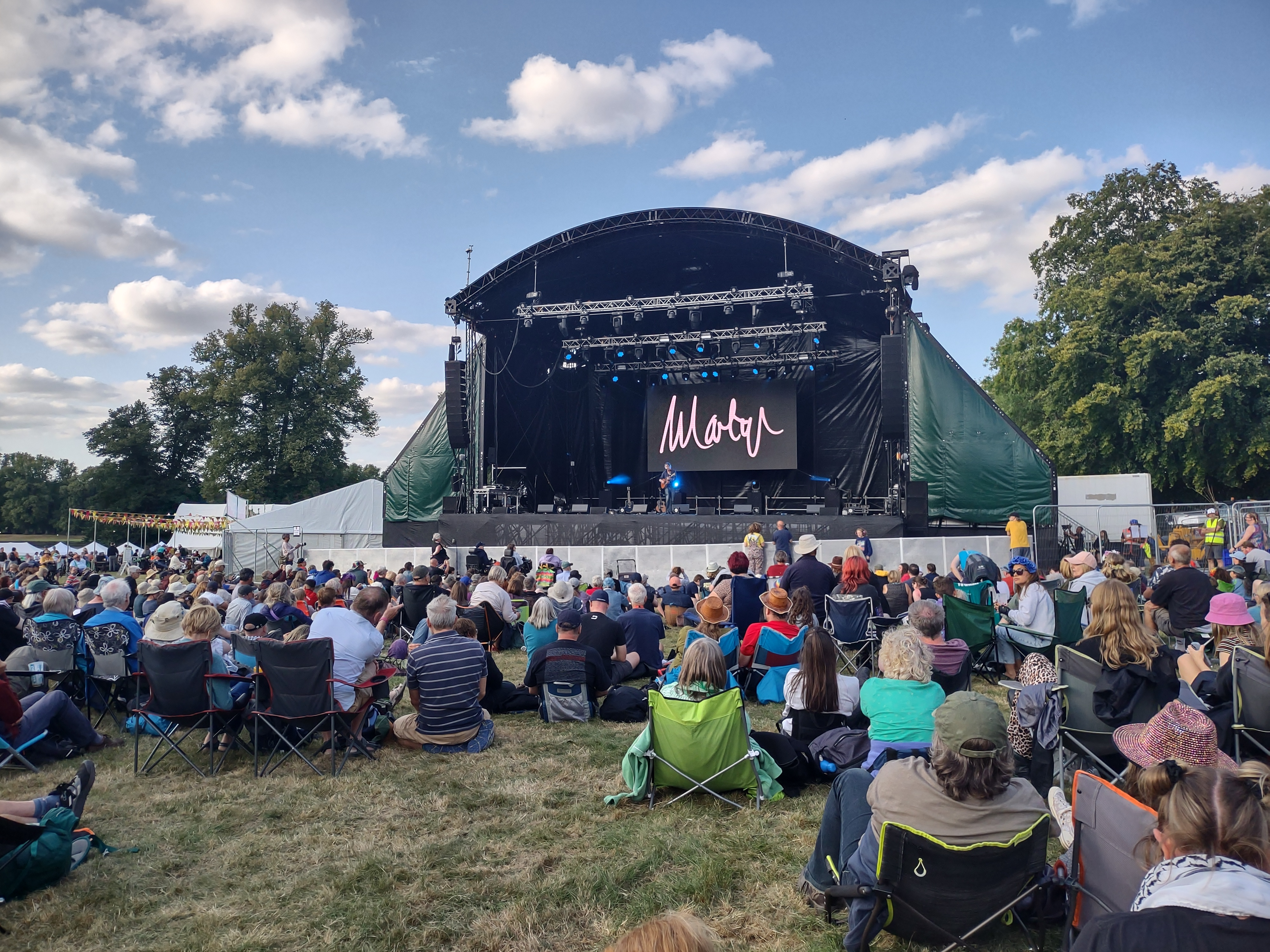
"Glade" stage, Boughton House
