= Reform (magazine) =

Reformed, also referred to as Reformed Magazine, previously known as Reform Magazine, is an editorially-independent subscription magazine published eight times a year by the United Reformed Church (URC).

The name was changed in April 2026 to avoid confusion with the populist political party Reform UK.

The editorial team is based at United Reformed Church House in Tavistock Place, London.

Reformed was first published in the year the URC was formed, 1972, as Reform. The magazine explores theology, ethics, personal spirituality and Christian perspectives on social and current affairs. Articles are written by journalists, academics, politicians, campaigners, scientists and religious leaders.

As well as interviews, features and book, music, exhibition, film and TV reviews, Reform carries regular lighthearted and anecdotal columns, a crossword, poetry and letters. It is edited by Stephen Tomkins. One of the regular columnists is comedy writer, presenter and stand-up comedian Paul Kerensa.

Reformed's interviewees have included: former Green Party Leader Jonathan Bartley, Carla Denyer, Justin Brierley, poets Benjamin Zephaniah and Stewart Henderson, Bafta-award-winning broadcaster Robert Beckford, novelist Marilynne Robinson, cofounder of Hillsong Church Bobbie Houston, historian Diarmaid MacCulloch, theologian Paula Gooder, Niall Cooper, Neil Thorogood, John Bradbury, Roo Stewart, Rik Wakeman, Tom Holland, Nadia Bolz-Weber. Tim Farron, Peter Tatchell, Lucy Berry, Stephen Cottrell and Jack Monroe.

Published by the URC, Reformed has readers of all faiths and none.
