= Farrago Poetry Slam Championship =

Annual poetry competition in London

The Farrago Poetry Slam Championship is a UK-based performance poetry competition organised by Farrago Poetry, a spoken-word organisation based in London, England. It is notable for introducing the poetry slam format to Britain and remains one of the longest-running slam poetry events in the country.

== History ==
Farrago Poetry introduced the poetry slam to Britain, when its first UK poetry slam was held in London in 1994. In the same year, the organisation began running the UK SLAM! Championships and the London SLAM! Championships. It was founded and is still overseen by poet John Paul O'Neill.

== Notable champions ==
- Dizraeli
- Hollie McNish
- Deanna Rodger
- Harry Baker
- Robin Lamboll
- Tom Gill
- Stephanie Chan
- Sven Stears

== Cultural significance ==
Farrago Poetry has been recognised in media and academic literature as a pioneer of slam poetry in the UK. Its events are noted for shaping the London spoken-word scene and influencing later slam competitions across the country.
