= Pádraig Ó Tuama =

Irish poet and theologian

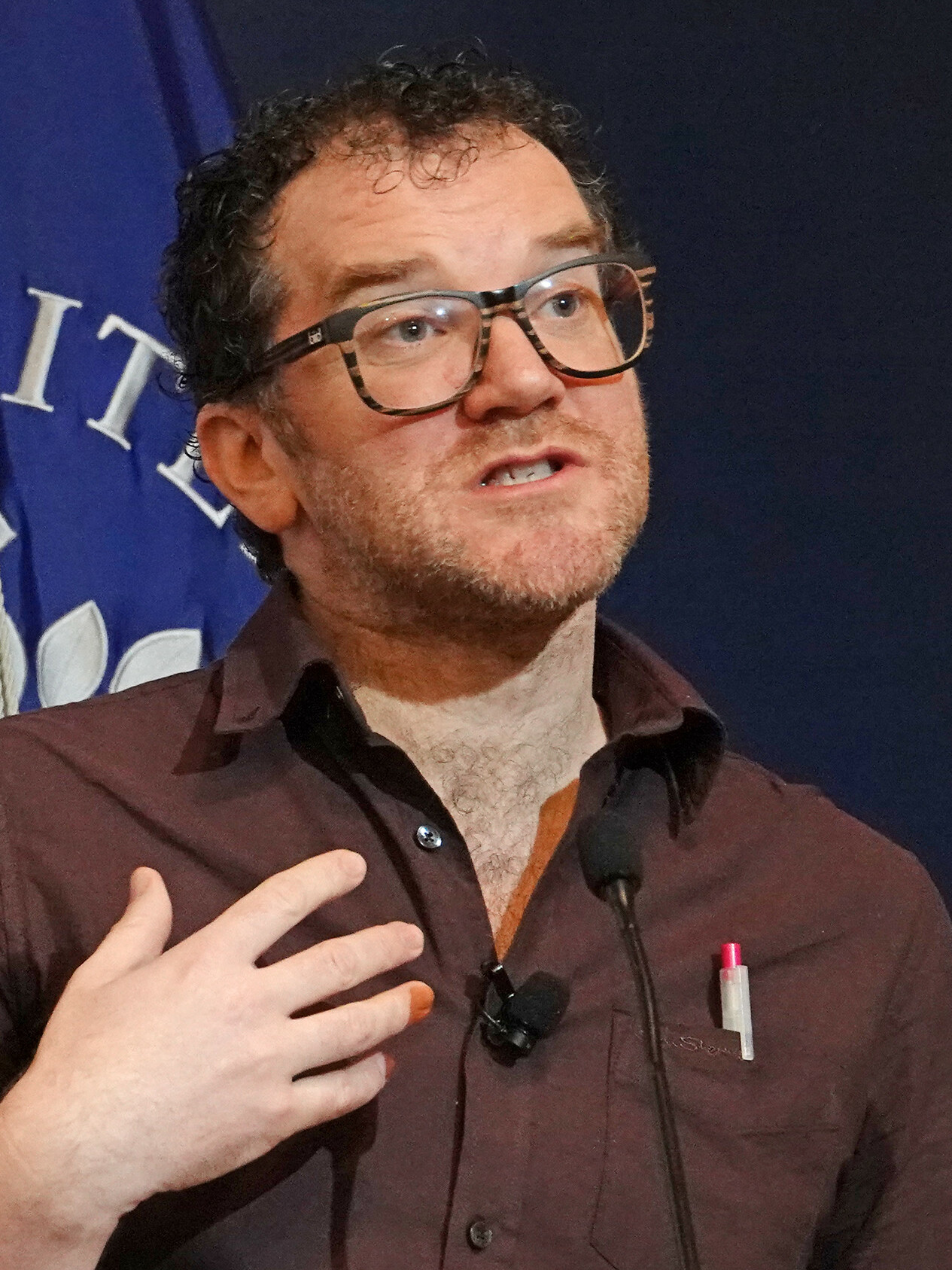
- Ó Tuama in 2023
- Education: University of Glasgow; Queen's University Belfast
- Writing career
- Genres: Poetry, theology, conflict mediation
- Notable works: Kitchen Hymns; 44 Poems on Being with Each Other

Pádraig Ó Tuama is an Irish poet, theologian and conflict mediator.

== Early life and education ==
Ó Tuama was brought up in a Catholic family in County Cork, Ireland. His first language is English. He also speaks Irish. Ó Tuama received a Bachelor of Arts degree in Divinity from the Maryvale Institute of Birmingham, England; a Master's of Theology from Queen's University Belfast, and a PhD from the School of Critical Studies (Creative Writing and Theology) at the University of Glasgow.

== Career ==
Ó Tuama has written five collections of poetry and a book of spiritual reflection, and is the editor of two poetry anthologies. His poetry has been featured in Harvard Review, RTÉ’s Poem of the Week, Poetry Ireland, New England Review, The Kenyon Review and the Academy of American Poets' Poem-A-Day. He has held numerous poetry residencies, most recently with The Church of the Heavenly Rest in New York City, and the Morton Deutsch International Center for Cooperation and Conflict Resolution at Columbia University. He was profiled in The New Yorker in December 2022.

Ó Tuama is a staff poet with the On Being Project, and hosts Poetry Unbound, a podcast produced by On Being Studios. Poetry Unbound had been downloaded more than 10 million times by the end of 2022. Ó Tuama's book Poetry Unbound: 50 Poems to Open your World, an anthology based on the podcast of the same name, was published by Canongate and W.W. Norton in 2022.

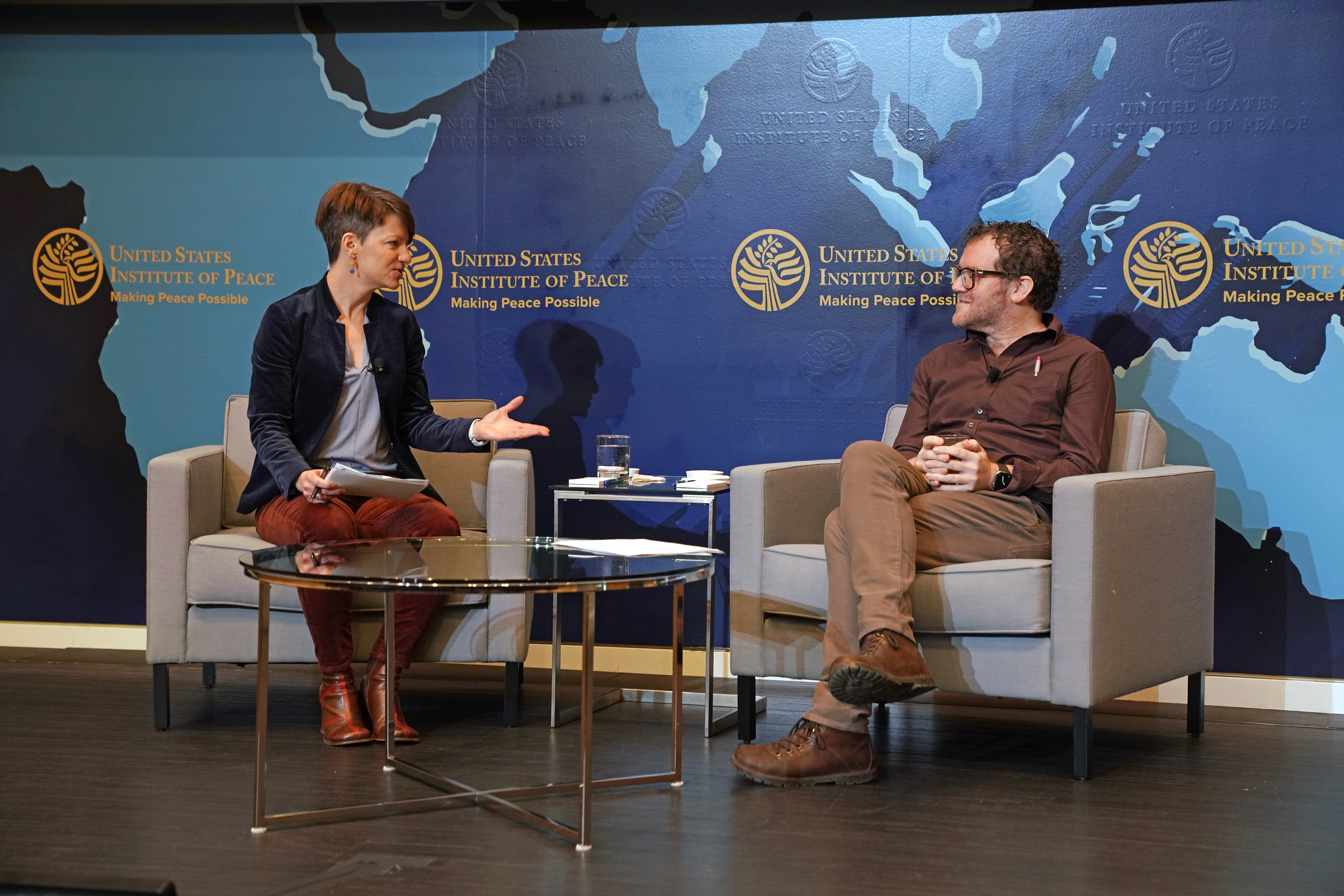
Left to right: Amanda Ripley, Washington Post columnist and author; Ó Tuama, poet-in-residence, International Center for Cooperation and Conflict Resolution, Columbia University

Ó Tuama has featured on Thought for the Day on BBC Radio 4, BBC Radio Scotland and BBC Radio Ulster. He has presented Something Understood on BBC Radio 4, and An Saol Ó Dheas on RTÉ. In 2021, he hosted the first season of The Corrymeela Podcast, and an episode of On Being with Krista Tippett. His interviewees have included Hanif Abdurraqib, The Edge, Mary McAleese, Martin Hayes, Billy Collins and Joy Harjo.

In 2011, along with Paul Doran, Ó Tuama co-founded Tenx9, a storytelling initiative based in Belfast. Tenx9 events have since been held in Nashville and Melbourne.

From 2014 to 2019, Ó Tuama was the leader of the Corrymeela Community, Ireland's oldest peace and reconciliation organisation. He has also collaborated with and worked for a number of other mediation organisations, including Co-operation Ireland, Mediation Northern Ireland, and Place for Hope. He is a frequent speaker at Greenbelt Festival.

In 2025 Ó Tuama joined the faculty of Yale Divinity School as the Professor in the Practice of Spirituality.

== Personal life ==
Ó Tuama is gay, and has been a vocal supporter of the legalisation of same-sex marriage. He has been outspoken against the practice of "reparative" or "conversion therapy".

== Published works ==
- 44 Poems on Being with Each Other (Canongate and W.W. Norton, 2025), ISBN 9781805302582, 978-1-324-08616-1
- Kitchen Hymns (Copper Canyon Press and Cheerio, 2025), ISBN 9781556597107, 9781739440572
- Being Here: Prayers for Curiosity, Justice, and Love (William B. Eerdmans, 2024), ISBN 9780802883476
- Feed the Beast (Broken Sleep Books, 2022), ISBN 9781915079527, 978-1-915079-52-7
- Poetry Unbound: 50 Poems to Open Your World (Canongate and W. W. Norton, 2022), ISBN 9781838856328, 978-1-324-03547-3
- In the Shelter: Finding a Home in the World (North America edition, with foreword by Krista Tippett, Broadleaf Books, 2021), ISBN 9781506470528
- Borders and Belonging. The Book of Ruth: A Story for Our Times (co-authored with Glenn Jordan, Canterbury Press, 2021), ISBN 9781786222565
- 15 sonnets in When Did We See You Naked (Reaves and Tombs [eds], SCM Press, 2021), ISBN 9780334060321
- Four poems in Mapping Faith: Theologies of Migration and Community (Lia Shimada [ed], Jessica Kingsley Publishers, 2020), ISBN 9781784507459
- "The Place Between2 in Neither Here nor There: The Many Voices of Liminality (Timothy Carson [ed], The Lutterworth Press, 2019), ISBN 9780718895433
- Daily Prayer with the Corrymeela Community (Canterbury Press, 2017), ISBN 9781848258686
- In the Shelter: Finding a Home in the World (Hodder & Stoughton, 2015), ISBN 9781444791723
- Sorry for Your Troubles (Canterbury Press, 2013), ISBN 9781848254626
- Readings from the Books of Exile (Canterbury Press, 2012), ISBN 9781848252059
