= Quench (band) =

English rock band

- Origin: England
- Genres: Rock, Alternative, Emo, Punk/Pop
- Years active: 2001–2009
- Label: Elevation/ICC
- Spinoff of: Why?
- Members: Jamie Hill; Mark Hamilton; Andy Davis; Ed Powell
- Past members: Kevin Sefton; Ron Knights * Chris Lane
- Website: quenchuk.com

Quench were an English rock band based in Cheltenham, Oxford and Bristol, England. The band toured the UK and Europe and performed at festivals, including the UK's Greenbelt festival.

Quench were quoted as "four piece rock band with solid mainstream appeal" according to independent industry magazine The Hit Sheet, which featured Quench's Bring The Summer In on one of their compilation CDs.

== History ==
=== Early years (1997–2000) ===
Quench grew out of folk/rock band Why?. Singer Jamie Hill and drummer Andy Davis then started a new rock project without the folk influences of Why? and joined by guitarist Kevin Sefton and bassist Ron Knights, they formed Quench (originally under the working title of 4 Real).

=== The Quench EP (2001) ===
The Quench EP was released shortly after the band signed to Elevation Records, the rock subsidiary of ICC Records, who signed Quench on the strength of their early showcase gigs in April 2001.

In 2002, guitarist Kevin Sefton left the band and Mark Hamilton was recruited to replace him. Mark brought a harder edge to the band which drew them away from their early Punk/Pop influences into a more guitar-heavy Emo direction, drawing influence from bands like Jimmy Eat World, Story Of The Year, My Chemical Romance and Finch in their new sound.

=== Afterglow (2003–2006) ===
Afterglow was recorded with producers Trevor Michael and Dave Lynch at Chapel Lane Studios in Hereford and ICC Studios in Eastbourne. The album was almost entirely arranged in the studio and the process of arranging, recording and mixing was achieved in just over three weeks.

Upon its release in 2003, Afterglow received rave reviews from the music press including a 10/10 rating in Cross Rhythms Magazine. The album also won the Best UK Album award at the 2003 UK UCAM Awards.

==== Track listing ====
1. Beautiful – (Jamie Hill)
2. Lost – (Mark Hamilton)
3. Think About It – (Andy Davis)
4. Bring The Summer In – (Hill)
5. I Can't Hear You – (Davis)
6. Underwhelmed – (Hill)
7. Alright – (Hill)
8. Siren – (Hamilton
9. Turn The Summer Off
10. Gollum – (Hamilton)
11. Time For Change – (Davis)
12. Afterglow – (Hamilton)

=== Reality Radio (2007–2009) ===
2007 saw Quench's return to record a new 4 track EP with rock producer Joe Gibb (Jane's Addiction, 3 Colours Red, Funeral For A Friend, Brigade, etc.). The new EP was recorded in one week in January 2007 at Mighty Atom studios in Wales and mastered by Pete Maher at Topfloor Music. The Reality Radio EP was released in August 2008 exclusively as an iTunes download. Reality Radio has been released and scored an excellent review from media outlet Cross Rhythms and CCM website Louder than the Music.

=== 2009 Breakup ===
On 29 July 2009 Quench announced on their official Myspace site that the band was splitting up. They played their last gig at Greenbelt on 29 August 2009.

== Members ==
=== Current members ===
- Jamie Hill – lead vocals, additional rhythm guitar, (keyboards 2001–2002)
- Mark Hamilton (a.k.a. Mark C) – lead guitar, backing vocals
- Andy Davis – drums, backing vocals
- Ed Powell – bass guitar, backing vocals (2005–present)

=== Former members ===
- Kevin Sefton – guitar (2001–2002)
- Ron Knights – bass guitar (2001–2005)
- Chris Lane - guitar (2008-2009)

== Discography ==
- Reality Radio (distributed by Elevation) (2008)
- Afterglow (Elevation) (2003)
- Quench EP (Elevation) (2002)

Several Quench songs have also featured on compilation albums including The Hit Sheet and Lemonaid.
