= Eden Burning =

- Origin: Cheltenham, UK
- Genres: Folk rock, Christian rock
- Years active: 1989–1996
- Website: edenburning.co.uk

Eden Burning were a popular Christian band from Cheltenham led by Paul Northup. They originally met as members of Charlton Kings Baptist church, and were active within the Christian music community between 1989 and 1996. The band's name refers to the Biblical tale of Garden of Eden burning down after Adam and Eve are banished. Cross Rhythms magazine described them as "pioneers in the evolution and creative development of British music carrying a spiritual message".

The band recorded three studio albums and two EP singles on CD as well as several audio cassette tapes and one video. There was also a live CD album, Smilingly Home, recorded in front of their home crowd at what is now the University of Gloucestershire. Subsequently, to celebrate 30 years of the Christian Greenbelt festival, they released a "Best of" album (The Hatchery 1990 – 1996).

Eden Burning toured extensively around Britain, particularly in the South and Midlands. They appeared at the Cropredy Festival in August 1995.

From January 1994 until Autumn 1996 the band produced nine issues of their newsletter, The Caper, with pictures, interviews and discussions.

All of Eden Burning's studio recordings were made at FFG studios in Cheltenham and Tewkesbury with David Pickering Pick or, for Brink, Mark Turner.

Northup later became general manager of Greenbelt Festivals Ltd. The other band members included Charlotte Ayrton, Mike Simpson, Neill Forrest (to 1992), Nive Hall (to 1995), Charlie Ingram (from 1992) and John "Mowf" Mowforth (from 1995).

== Albums ==
=== Thin Walls (1990) ===
Cassette tape

Track listing

1. Help my Unbelief
2. Thin Walls
3. No Man's Land
4. There was a Time
5. Where did We Hide Him
6. The Place I Live
7. Do not be Afraid
8. Things I Didn't Say
9. Pictures Tell Lies
10. Jericho Skies
11. The Waiting

All songs by Eden Burning; Lyrics by Paul Northup except "The Waiting" by Neill Forrest.

=== Vinegar and Brown Paper (1992) ===
CD

Track listing

1. My Senses Fly (PN)
2. If I Go Up (NH)
3. The Reel of Pickering Pick
4. Speak Easy (NF)
5. Different Drum
6. The Weaver (David Adam)
7. Feel the Rain (NF)
8. Jubilee (PN)
9. Simply Breathe (PN)
10. Hold the Dream (NF)
11. A Little More (PN)

All songs by Eden Burning; Lyrics by band members are by Paul Northup (PN), Neill Forrest (NF) or Nive Hall (NH).
Also available on cassette tape. The lyrics of "Different Drum" are based on words from Psalms 120–134.

=== Smilingly Home (1993) ===
CD (live)

Track listing

1. There was a Time
2. The Calling
3. Much More Than Near
4. Alec Murphy's
5. Hold the Dream
6. Medicine Bow
7. Jigs and Hornpipe
8. My Senses Fly
9. Jubilee
10. The Place I Live
11. If I Go up
12. The Reel of Pickering Pick
13. Working Out Tomorrow
14. Midnight Sun
15. Feel the Rain

All songs by Eden Burning except "Medicine Bow" by the Waterboys.
Also available on cassette tape.

=== Mirth and Matter (1994) ===
CD

Track listing

1. Remember When (NH)
2. The Joust (PN)
3. Me Comfort Still (PN)
4. Sunrise (East of London) (PN/NH)
5. Six Months On (PN)
6. Hey Diddle Diddle (PN)
7. Dependence Day (PN)
8. Forgive-Me-Not (PN)
9. Song for an Unknown God (PN)
10. Hem Me In (PN)

The Joust featured Brian Blessed.
All songs by Eden Burning; Lyrics by band members are by Paul Northup (PN) and/or Nive Hall (NH).

=== Brink (1996) ===
CD

Track listing

1. Deep Blue Sea (3.06)
2. Movers and Shakers (4.06)
3. Stories (3.49)
4. Almost Spent (4.05)
5. Big Regret (2.53)
6. Desire Lines (4.36)
7. Another Country (4.13)
8. With a Kiss (3.34)
9. Wrap It Up (4.03)
10. Western Eyes (4.30)
11. Let Me Lose (7.26)

All songs by Eden Burning; all lyrics by Paul Northup.

=== The Hatchery 1990–1996 (2003) ===
Download-only release

Track listing

1. Deep Blue Sea
2. Hem Me In
3. Feel the Rain
4. Stories
5. My Senses Fly
6. If I Go Up
7. Let Me Lose
8. Song For an Unknown God
9. Much More Than Near
10. There Was a Time
11. Hold the Dream
12. Desire Lines
13. The Joust
14. Jigs
15. Movers and Shakers
16. Six Months On
17. Midnight Sun
18. Never Could Play the Guitar
19. Harvest Home

All of these tracks were released during Eden Burning's career, except "Never Could Play the Guitar" and "Harvest Home", both from 1996.

== EP Singles ==
=== Much More than Near (1991) ===
Cassette tape

1. Much More than Near
2. Midnight Sun
3. The Calling
4. Everlasting Arms

All songs by Eden Burning; Lyrics by Neill Forrest except "The Everlasting Arms" by Paul Northup.

=== You Could Be the Meadow (1994) ===
CD

1. You Could Be the Meadow
2. The Brontes, Alice and Me
3. Forgive-Me-Not (live)
4. Matty Groves (live)

All songs written and arranged by Northup/Eden Burning except Matty Groves Trad arr Eden Burning.
Also available on cassette tape.

=== Be an Angel (1995) ===
CD

1. Be an Angel
2. Like in Minds
3. Song for an Unknown God (live)
4. Hem Me In (ambient remix) (live)

All songs written and arranged by Northup/Eden Burning.
Also available on cassette tape.

== Video ==
=== Through the Looking Glass (1994) ===
VHS Video tape

Track listing

1. The Joust
2. Jigs
3. Dependence Day
4. Song for an Unknown God
5. Jubilee
6. Bones
7. Hey Diddle Diddle
8. Hem Me In

All songs written and arranged by Eden Burning except "Bones" by Luka Bloom.

== Other cassette tapes ==
These are listed for completeness. They were generally available through the Caper newsletter.

Live at the Orange 19/6/94 (1995). (This is the same gig as on the video but it includes more songs)
Autumn 1995 (1995).
Live in Session on BBC Radio Leeds (1996).
Demos (nd).
Live at Last (1996).

== Other tracks (including ones on compilations) ==
Eden Burning contributed one track to the Geoff Mann celebration CD Mannerisms in 1994, covering Mann's song "His Love". Other contributors include Pallas, IQ, Galahad, Pendragon, Jadis, and Twelfth Night.
Tracks were included on Cross Rhythms (CR) compilation tape cassettes as follows: Vol 1 (CR Issue 18) (1994) "There was a Time", Vol 3 (CR Issue 20) (1994) "Hey Diddle Diddle", and Vol 14 (CR Issue 31) (1996) "With a Kiss".
The track "Brontes, Alice and Me" was included on the Seahorse CD compilation.
