= Soul Sanctuary Gospel Choir =

- Choir
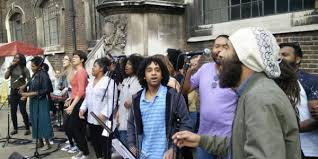
- Soul Sanctuary Gospel Choir singing outside at St James's Church, Piccadilly in 2018
- Former name: St Patrick's Gospel Choir
- Origin: London
- Founded: 2005
- Founder: Miko Giedroyc, Tracey Jane Campbell
- Genre: Gospel Music
- Organist: Miko Giedroyc
- Chief conductor: Clarence Hunte, Chris Bullock
- Influences: Kirk Franklin, Donald Lawrence, Trey McLaughlin, Kim Burrell
- Website: www.soulsanctuarygospel.com

Soul Sanctuary Gospel Choir is a London-based, auditioned gospel choir whose mission is "to spread a message of faith, hope, and love through contemporary gospel music; to create performances full of life-affirming joy and soulful celebration, collaborating with other artists and art forms; and to support and work with a diverse range of like-minded churches, charities, and communities."

In pursuit of this goal, the choir which became a registered charity and incorporated organisation in January 2018 currently has three main activities: first, Soul at Saint James, an outdoor festival of music and spoken word at St James's Piccadilly on the first Sunday of the month, themed each month according to a fundamental human value and accessible to all comers, not just church goers; second, regular ministry and concerts at St Martin-in-the-Fields; and third, prison ministry, usually in prison chapels but also elsewhere.

Otherwise the choir has a full diary of other performances and recordings, highlights of which were singing on Mica Paris's first gospel album "Gospel" and in Sky Arts "The Night Watchmen's Nativity" in 2020, the 2021 Festival of Remembrance at The Albert Hall and in the 2023 feature film "Greatest Days".

== Recordings ==
- With All Your Soul (2013)
- Silent Night (2017)
- You Are The Key (2018)

== Notable Appearances ==
- The Resurrection (The Jazz Cafe, 2015 & 2018)
- Red Wednesday - Aid to the Church in Need (2016, 2017)
- HMP Wandsworth (Easter 2018)
- Anniversary of Grenfell Tragedy (2018)
- Greenbelt (2017, 2018)
- Lost and Found (Adoremus Festival, Liverpool, 2018)
- Church of England "Follow The Star" Advert (2019)
- A Night to Remember (with Mica Paris) at St Edmundsbury Cathedral
- 'The Prayer' - virtual choir video made during the coronavirus lockdown (2020)
- 'Rise Within Us - The Coming of the Spirit' recording celebrating Pentecost, dedicated to the staff and prisoners of HMP Wandsworth, released 31 May 2020
- 'Keep Our Doors Open' Fundraising Concert for St Martin-in-the-Fields, 31 May 2020
- Recording of 'Lean on Me' to commemorate third anniversary of Grenfell Tower Fire.

== BBC Recordings ==
- 'Easter Glory', BBC Radio 2, Maida Vale Studios, Easter Sunday 2015
- 'Sunday Worship' BBC Radio 4, St James's Church, Piccadilly 2015
- 'At the foot of the Cross', BBC Radio 2, Maida Vale Studios, Good Friday 2016
- 'Sunday Worship', BBC Radio 4, Maida Vale Studios, Christmas 2016
- 'Sunday Worship', BBC Radio 4, St Martin in the Fields, Christmas 2017
- 'Daily Service', BBC Radio 4, Maida Vale Studios, Summer 2018
- 'Get Up and Flee- The Flight to Egypt', BBC Radio 4
- 'At the foot of the Cross', BBC Radio 2, Maida Vale Studios, Good Friday 2020 (pre-recorded)

== TV appearances ==
In 2019, the choir appeared in the second of a two part TV documentary, 'Britain's Easter Story' which was presented by Gareth Malone and Karen Gibson. The 5 minute segment of the documentary showed the choir in rehearsal at Farm Street Church followed by a performance in church. The choir performed excerpts from 'The Resurrection' a selection of contemporary gospel songs, which tell the story of Jesus's resurrection.
