= Gaz Brookfield =

- Brookfield playing live at the Cheese and Grain, Frome in 2022.

Background information
- Born: Gareth Brookfield; 4 July 1979 (age 47); Kettering, Northamptonshire, England
- Genres: Acoustic, Folk, Rock
- Occupations: Singer, songwriter
- Instruments: Guitar, vocals, harmonica
- Years active: 2006–present
- Labels: In My Lounge Records; Land Pirate Records
- Website: http://www.gazbrookfield.com

Gareth "Gaz" Brookfield (born 4 July 1979) is an English folk and rock musician, who is based near Swindon, England. He is usually a solo artist, playing acoustic guitar, but is regularly joined by fiddle player Ben Wain and also has a full band, the Company of Thieves.

== Biography ==
In his early career, Brookfield played with a number of bands but moved to a solo career in 2006. In 2010, he won Acoustic Magazine's Singer-Songwriter of the Year award, which also won him a place on the Big Top stage at Beautiful Days Festival, where he has played a number of times since. He has also played at other major festivals such as Glastonbury, and supported artists such as The Levellers, New Model Army, Ferocious Dog, and Frank Turner. In 2011, he became the first (and to this date only) unsigned solo act to sell out the 450-capacity Fleece in Bristol, an achievement which he has since repeated four more times with his Christmas shows; the 2014 show was also his 1,000th gig. In 2017, due to demand, the Christmas show was moved to the 750-capacity Bristol Bierkeller which sold out as well. With the closure of the Bierkeller shortly afterwards, the 2018 show was moved again, this time to the bigger SWX venue, where the 2019 show was also held. The Bristol Post, naming Brookfield in their "60 Coolest People in Bristol" article, said "There aren't many musicians in Bristol who could sell out the 1,100-capacity SWX, but he does."

During the COVID-19 pandemic, Brookfield was forced to shield due to his Type 1 diabetes, and was one of the first artists to write and publish an entire album about the pandemic which was appropriately called Lockdown and was released on 2 October 2020. While unable to tour during the pandemic, he played a weekly live stream entitled "Live from the Lockdown", which celebrated its one-year anniversary with the 52nd show on 12 March 2021. Brookfield released his eighth album, Idiomatic on 1 November 2021, which reached No.71 in the UK Albums Chart, and No.10 in the UK Download Chart.

In August 2023, Brookfield's ninth studio album, Morning Walking Club, was released. It reached No.37 in the UK Albums Chart, and No.1 in the UK Official Folk Albums Chart.

In August 2025, his tenth studio album, Waiting for Wisdom, reached No.1 in the UK Download Chart and No.43 in the UK Album Chart.

== The Company of Thieves ==
Gaz Brookfield and the Company of Thieves, 2022. {l-r} Leks Wood, Ben Wain, Tom Granville, Gaz Brookfield, Nick Parker

Brookfield plays semi-regular shows with a full band, the line-up of which is as follows;

- Ben Wain (fiddle)
- Nick Parker (mandolin)
- Chris Webb (guitar)
- Leks Wood (drums)
- Jon Buckett (keyboards)
- Tom Granville, (bass)

== Discography ==
Brookfield has released ten original studio albums, plus four "Solo Acoustic Guy" albums with re-workings of his previous songs. He has also produced a number of live albums.

=== Studio ===
Year	Title	Peak chart positions			
Year	Title	UK Albums	UK Independent	UK Download	UK Folk Albums
2011	Trial and Error	—	—	—	—
2012	Tell it to the Beer	—	—	—	—
2013	In The Company Of Thieves	—	—	—	—
2015	True and Fast	—	—	—	—
2016	I Know My Place	—	—	—	—
2019	Lostfolk	—	—	—	—
2020	Lockdown	—	—	—	—
2021	Idiomatic	71	20	10	—
2023	Morning Walking Club	37	10	6	1
2025	Waiting for Wisdom	43	17	1	—
All data from the UK Official Charts.

=== Reworkings ===
- Solo Acoustic Guy (2015)
- Solo Acoustic Guy II (2016)
- Solo Acoustic Guy III (2017)
- Aged Revolt (split with Jake Martin, covering each other's songs, 2018)
- Solo Acoustic Guy IV (2021)
- Solo Acoustic Guy V: Acoustiomatic (2022)
- Solo Acoustic Guy VI: Morning Walking Club (2024)
