= Vive (a cappella group) =

English six-part a cappella group

- Origin: London, England
- Genres: A cappella, jazz, soul, pop, spiritual, fusion
- Years active: 2012–2014
- Members: Lewis Daniel; James Rose; Martynas Vilpisauskas; Ben Cox; Sam Robson; Emily Dankworth
- Website: www.vivevocals.com

Vive was a six-part a cappella group from England, United Kingdom.

Consisting of a line-up of five men and a woman (bass, baritone, two tenors, male alto and soprano), it builds upon the contemporary a cappella sound, taking inspiration from Take 6 and The Real Group.

They won the final of The Voice Festival UK 2013 and were presented with the Ward Swingle Award for outstanding originality, outstanding musicality and also best arrangement.

The group disbanded in late 2014.

== Members ==
- Lewis Daniel (bass)
- James Rose (baritone, composer, arranger)
- Martynas Vilpisauskas (tenor 2)
- Ben Cox (tenor 1)
- Sam Robson (alto, composer, arranger)
- Emily Dankworth (soprano)
- Sam Merrick (sound engineer, 2012-Nov 2014, manager/artist liaison, 2012-Nov 2013)

== Broadcasting appearances ==
=== Television ===
- The One Show, BBC One (20 March 2013, 7pm GMT)

=== Radio ===
- Ronnie Scott's Radio Show, Jazz FM (UK)/Jazz.FM91 (CA) (12/13 January 2013)
- Inspirit with Jumoke Fashola, BBC London 94.9 (20 January 2013, 8.15am GMT)
- The Choir with Aled Jones, BBC Radio 3 (20 January 2013, 5pm GMT)
- Ronnie Scott's Radio Show, Jazz FM (UK)/Jazz.FM91 (CA) (23/24 March 2013)
- The Paul O'Grady Show, BBC Radio 2 (7 April 2013)
- The Choir with Clare Wheeler, BBC Radio 3 (28 April 2013, 5pm GMT)
