= Dizraeli =

- Born: Rowan Alexander Sawday; 26 August 1982 (age 44); Bristol, England
- Genre: Hip hop
- Website: http://www.dizraeli.com/

Dizraeli is now known as Diz Undone, citing his reasons for changing his stage name as "wanting to distance himself from the genocidal actions of the government of Israel, as well as the imperialist, conservative politics of 19th century British prime minister Benjamin Disraeli".

Rowan Alexander Sawday, better known by his stage name Dizraeli, is a British rapper, poet and musician from Bristol, England. Though rooted strongly in hip-hop traditions, his work draws inspiration from old folk music, recognising the common ground shared by songs of the people from any point in history.

In 2019 Dizraeli publicly talked about struggling with mental health issues for around a year around 2017 for which he received therapy.

== Early life and education ==
Dizraeli was born Rowan Alexander Sawday on 26 August 1982, to the travel publisher and ecological campaigner Alastair Sawday and Mary Sawday.

In his memoirs, Traveling Light, Dizraeli's father Alastair said that he "should have... better fathered [his son Dizraeli]."

Dizraeli attended a comprehensive school in North Somerset, and was bullied there.

He has practiced as a vegetarian. He is bisexual and was aware of this growing up, and came out to a crowd of 4,000 people.

He attended the University of Sussex. He spent a period studying West African music in Senegal.

== Career ==
Dizraeli has performed at the Glastonbury Festival, the Latitude Festival, the Eden Project, and the Royal Festival Hall. He has won both the Farrago UK Slam Championships and the BBC Radio 4 Poetry Slam, and written several hip-hop plays including Rebel Cell, with Baba Brinkman. Dizraeli & The Small Gods were shortlisted for the 2014 Songlines Music Awards for their album Moving in the Dark. In 2015 they collaborated on a new video for the title track, with Jamie Magnus Stone.

In 2016 Dizraeli released his EP "Eat My Camera" and continued to tour as a solo artist.

He once vowed never to fly again, only to get work in Cairo, and therefore traveled there over land.

== Recognition ==
Dizraeli won both the Farrago Poetry Slam Championship and the BBC Radio 4 Poetry Slam.

Dizraeli & The Small Gods were shortlisted for the 2014 Songlines Music Awards for their album Moving in the Dark.
