= Riding Lights Theatre Company =

British independent theatre company

Riding Lights is a British independent theatre company which has toured shows nationally and internationally since 1977. Based at Friargate Theatre, York since 2000, the company has staged numerous original productions such as "Science Friction" and "Dick Turpin", that have toured nationally. Other recent tours have included Mistero Buffo (2005), The Winter's Tale (2006) and a co-production with York Theatre Royal, African Snow played at York and the Trafalgar Studios in London before touring across the country. The play was a contribution to the national commemorations of the 200th anniversary of the abolition of slavery in the UK and took as its theme the stories of John Newton and Olaudah Equiano. In 2007 they toured a play looking at the Christian community of contemporary Bethlehem called Salaam Bethlehem. In 2008 they revived their production of Jerome K Jerome's Three Men in a Boat as a co-production with York Theatre Royal.

The company has a Youth Theatre which has performed acknowledged productions, including Headstrong and The Miracle as part of the BT Shell Connections National Theatre Competition, Free For All (a devised production) and a modern production of Julius Caesar.

Riding Lights were one of the co-producers of the historic York Mystery Plays in 2012.
