= Wildwood Kin =

English folk rock band

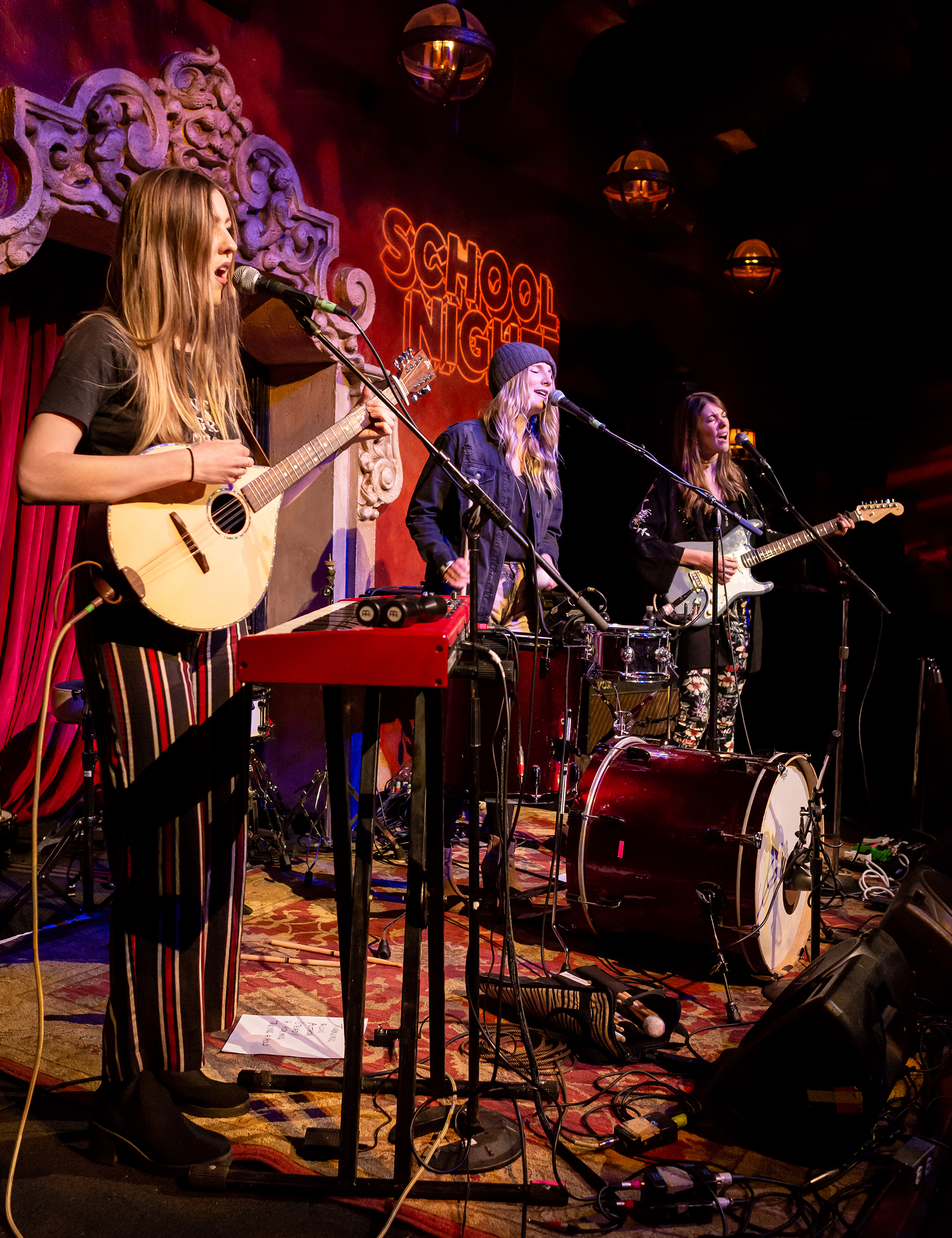
- Wildwood Kin performing in 2018

Background information
- Origin: Exeter, Devon, England
- Genres: Rock; acoustic rock; indie folk
- Years active: 2015–present
- Labels: Sony; Silvertone
- Members: Beth Key; Emillie Key
- Website: wildwoodkin.com

Wildwood Kin were an English folk rock band, composed of sisters Beth Key and Emillie Whiteside and their cousin Meghann Loney from Exeter, Devon, England. They released their first album, Turning Tides, in August 2017. They released their self-titled second album in October 2019, featuring "Beauty In Your Brokenness", a song inspired by the Japanese art of kintsugi. Wildwood Kin appeared on Channel 4's Sunday Brunch in September 2019.

Meghann Loney left the band at the end of 2022, after the second album, and in November 2023 the sisters launched a new project: fieldlily.

== Career ==
Before they officially formed as a band, Beth, Emillie and Meghann would harmonise to everything that was in earshot, from songs on the radio, TV jingles, adverts to even the doorbell. They soon found their signature style with Emillie playing guitar, Beth playing the bouzouki or keyboard and Meghann playing the drums. They all join forces for harmonies and take turns on lead vocals. The band credit musical influences such as Simon & Garfunkel, Fleetwood Mac and James Taylor, as well as newer acts such as Mumford & Sons, Ben Howard, Fleet Foxes, Sigur Ros and The Civil Wars.

They played their first gig at an open mic night at Stokeinteignhead’s Church House Inn to around 60 people. This was where they caught the attention of their future management. Their career then developed quickly and in 2017 they released their debut album, Turning Tides, via Sony Music's imprint label Silvertone. The band spent much of 2017 touring playing a number of UK and European festivals over the summer, including an appearance with Seth Lakeman at Radio 2 Live in Hyde Park and on the BBC Music Introducing Stage at Glastonbury.

In describing the band, The Sunday Times noted "Fleetwood Mac-like harmonies, hints of Fleet Foxes’ desolate, spectral acoustica, echoes of Ben Howard’s richly textured but ramshackle sparseness, a love of Mumford-like propulsion and explosiveness."

They released a cover of "God Rest Ye Merry Gentlemen" on the 21 of December 2017.

In 2018, they performed their single "Steady My Heart" along with "Taking A Hold" on the one-off revival special of The Old Grey Whistle Test with Bob Harris.

In July 2019, they announced their second, self-titled album, alongside lead single "Never Alone", written with and produced by Ed Harcourt. The rest of the album, produced by Ian Grimble, addresses profound themes like love, loss and spirituality. After a UK headline tour to support the album release, Wildwood Kin toured through Europe with the acclaimed indie rock-folk band Boy & Bear.

Throughout 2022, the band would hint at new music being recorded and played some new songs on their UK tour that year which was supported by the band JAKL. However, during the Cardiff show at the acapella studio, JAKL could not appear and Beth asked her friend, singer-songwriter Remy CB, to perform that night in their place.

On 5 November 2022, they announced on their social medias that Meghann would be leaving the band to spend more time at home. Their final show together was on 17 December 2022, at 'The Phoenix' in their home city of Exeter. Emillie and Beth went on to found a new group, fieldlily.

== Discography ==
=== Albums ===
Title	Details	Peak chart positions
Title	Details	UK
Turning Tides	Release date: 18 August 2017; Label: Silvertone/Sony	37
Wildwood Kin	Release date: 4 October 2019; Label: Silvertone/Sony	51

=== EPs ===
Title	Details
Salt of the Earth	Release date: 31 January 2015; Label: Wildwood Kin
Voices Of Equilibrium	Release date: 30 November 2018; Label: Silvertone/Sony

=== Singles ===
Year	Title
2016	"Warrior Daughter"
2017	"Run"
2017	"Taking a Hold"
2017	"On and On"
2017	"God Rest Ye Merry Gentlemen"
2018	"Steady My Heart"
2019	"Never Alone"
2019	"Beauty In Your Brokenness"
2019	"Time Has Come"
