= Beth Singler =

British anthropologist

Beth Victoria Lois Singler, born Beth Victoria White, is a British anthropologist specialising in artificial intelligence. She is known for her digital ethnographic research on the impact of apocalyptic stories on the conception of AI and robots, her comments on the societal implications of AI, as well as her public engagement work. The latter includes a series of four documentaries on whether robots could feel pain, human-robot companionship, AI ethics, and AI consciousness. She is currently the Junior Research Fellow in Artificial Intelligence at Homerton College, University of Cambridge.

== Education ==
Singler completed an undergraduate degree in Theology and Religious Studies at the University of Cambridge, focusing on religious studies and the sociology and anthropology of religion. After graduating, she spent nine years working in London as a freelance scriptwriter and developer, which included completing a postgraduate diploma in Script Development with the National Film and Television School in 2007.

Singler returned to Cambridge in 2010 to begin an MPhil in Theology and Religious Studies, completing a master’s thesis on the religious interpretations of anorexia amongst the Pro-Ana Movement. Her subsequent PhD thesis was the first ethnography of the Indigo Children, a New Age idea with online communities and discourse. Her thesis was published as a monograph in 2017, as The Indigo Children: New Age Experimentation with Self and Science.

== Academic career ==
In 2016, Singler joined the Faraday Institute for Science and Religion (St Edmund's College, University of Cambridge) as a post-doctoral research associate on the ‘Human Identity in the Age of Nearly Human Machines’ project on the implications of AI on our understanding of what it means to be. She embarked on a film making project with DragonLight Films, producing four short documentaries over the next two years. The first, Pain in the Machine, won the Best Research Film of the Year award from the AHRC’s Research in Film Awards in 2017.

She was made an associate fellow at the Leverhulme Centre for the Future of Intelligence in 2016. She was a founding member of the AI Narratives research project with the LCFI and the Royal Society, which led to a Royal Society report in 2018. She was one of the Co-Principal Investigators for the Global AI Narratives project, funded by the Templeton World Charitable Foundation and Google DeepMind, until 2019.

In 2018 she was appointed Junior Research Fellow in Artificial Intelligence at Homerton College, University of Cambridge.

She was a member of the UK Advisory Board for “Citizenship in the Digital Age”, a Templeton project. She co-chaired the advisory committee for the Royal Society for the Arts/Google DeepMind Forum on Ethical AI.

She was one of the speakers in the Hay Festival’s Cambridge Series in 2017, as well as being one of the ‘Hay 30’, as a part of the festival’s 30th anniversary celebrations. Sections of her talk have been used in a Hay Festival podcast, alongside Ian McEwan, Garry Kasparov, Stephen Fry, and Marcus De Sautoy.

== Publications ==
=== Books ===
- The Indigo Children: New Age Experimentation with Self and Science, 2019 Routledge ISBN 9780367884444

=== Selected papers ===
- “Blessed by the Algorithm”: Theistic Conceptions of Artificial Intelligence as Entanglements of AI and Religion (2020)
- The AI Creation Meme: A Case Study of the New Visibility of Religion in Artificial Intelligence Discourse (2020)
- Artificial Intelligence and the Parent/Child Narrative (2020)
- Conceiving AI: Creation and the Parent/Child Narrative in Blade Runner 2049 (2019)
- An Ethnographic Discussion of Existential Hope and Despair in AI Apocalypticism (2019)
- An Introduction to Artificial Intelligence and Religion for the Religious Studies Scholar (2018)
- Roko’s Basilisk or Pascal’s? Thinking of Singularity Thought Experiments as Implicit Religion (2018)

== Personal life ==
Beth Singler lives in Cambridge with her husband and son . An article she wrote for Aeon magazine in 2018 speculated on the benefits of teaching AI to play Dungeons & Dragons.
