= L.A. Salami =

British singer and songwriter

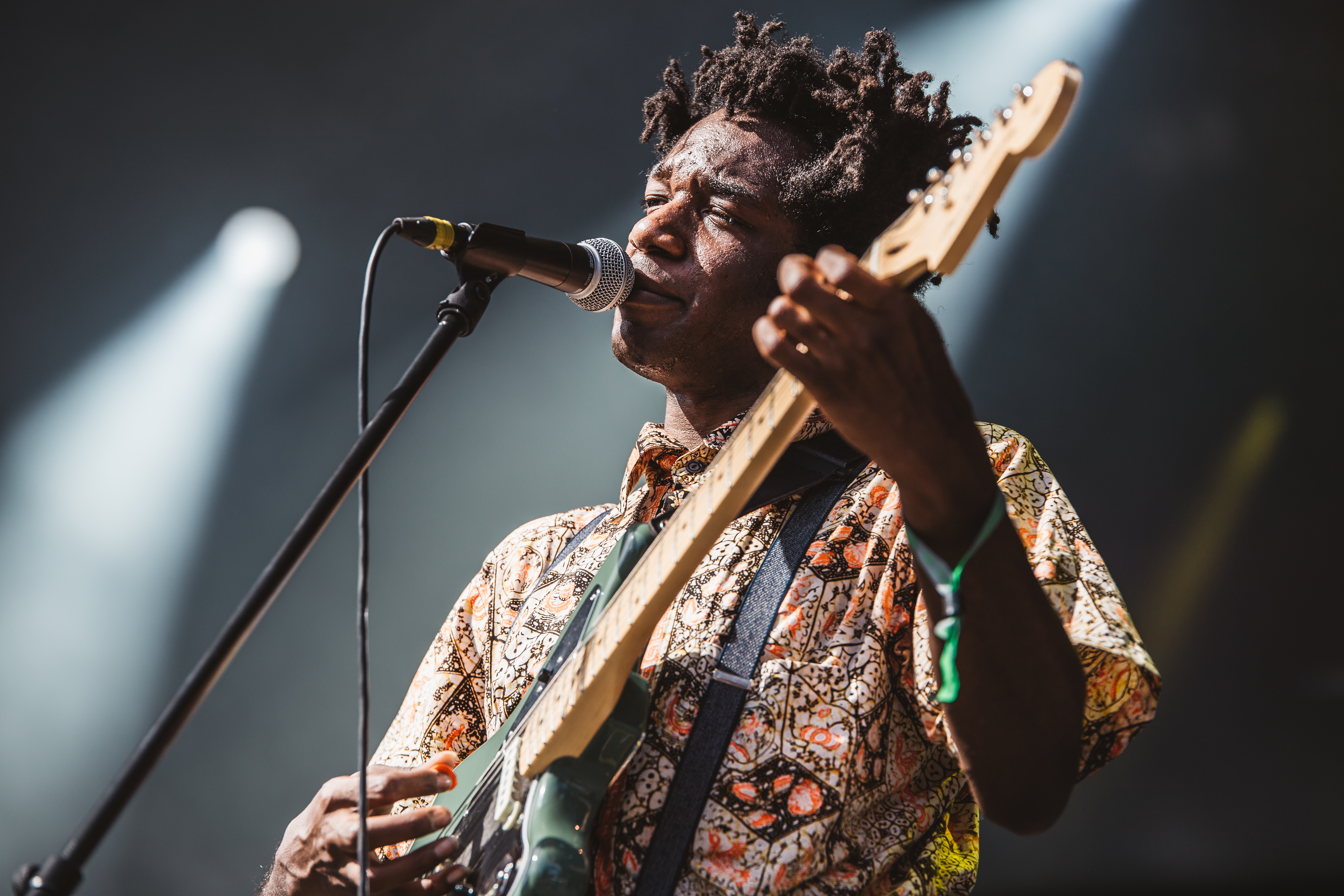

Background information
- Born: Lookman Adekunle Salami
- Origin: London, England
- Genres: Folk; Post-modern Blues; Acoustic; Rock
- Instruments: Acoustic Guitar; Electric guitar; Harmonica
- Labels: Sunday Best Recordings; Camouflage Recordings; Domino Publishing
- Website: https://www.lasalami.com/

Lookman Adekunle Salami, known professionally as L.A. Salami, is a British singer and songwriter, who is signed to Sunday Best Recordings & Domino Publishing. He has released four EPs and four albums.

== Career ==
Salami grew up in foster care, developing a fascination with music.

Salami's break came in 2012, when he was chosen to support Lianne La Havas on tour. Salami was eventually signed by independent London label Camouflage Recordings. Christopher Bailey, Chief Creative Officer at fashion house Burberry then got in contact to arrange a Burberry Acoustic Session, which led to L.A. Salami opening the Burberry Prorsum Menswear Spring/Summer 2014 runway show in Kensington Palace Gardens, Hyde Park, London.

Salami's first EP, Another Shade of Blue, was released through Camouflage Recordings in 2013. They released The Prelude EP in 2014, which was followed by a short tour around Britain In 2014, Burberry asked L.A. Salami to soundtrack their SS/14 Menswear campaign, Zane Lowe singled him out as a future star of BBC Radio 1, and Esquire Magazine featured him as one of the ten "Most Stylish Men In Music".

In 2015, Salami signed to Sunday Best Recordings & Domino Publishing. He spent the rest of that year working on his debut full-length album, recording with producer Matt Ingram at the Urchin Studios in London.

In August 2016, Salami released his debut album Dancing With Bad Grammar, which featured singles "The City Nowadays", "I Wear This Because Life Is War!", "Going Mad As The Street Bins" and "I Can't Slow Her Down".

His second album, The City of Bootmakers, was recorded in Berlin, Germany, with producer Robbie Moore at his studio Impression Recordings, and released in April 2018 on Sunday Best. It featured the singles "England is Unwell", "Terrorism! (The Isis Crisis)", "Generation L(ost)" and "Jean Is Gone", and was named "Album of the Day" by BBC 6 Music.

His EP Self-Portrait In Sound EP was released on 4 February 2020. On 28 April 2020, he announced the release of his third album, The Cause of Doubt & a Reason to Have Faith, set to release on 17 July 2020. Its first single, "Things Ain't Changed", and its video were released on 28 April.

== Discography ==
=== Studio albums ===
- Dancing With Bad Grammar (Sunday Best, 2016)
- The City of Bootmakers (Sunday Best, 2018)
- The Cause of Doubt & a Reason to Have Faith (Sunday Best, 2020)
- Ottoline (Sunday Best, October 14, 2022)

=== EPs ===
- Another Shade of Blue (Camouflage, 2013)
- The Prelude EP (Camouflage, 2014)
- Lookman & The Bootmakers (Sunday Best, 2017)
- Self Portrait in Sound EP (2020)

=== Singles ===
- "Jianni's From Australia (She'll Get By Fine)" (2012)
- "The Old Queen's Head" (Camouflage, 2013)
- "Another Shade of Blue" (Camouflage, 2013)
- "Just Wasting Time (The Otis Redding Way)" (Camouflage, 2014)
- "When The Poet Sings" (Camouflage, 2014)
- "The City Nowadays" (2016)
- "Going Mad As The Street Bins" (2016)
- "I Wear This Because Life Is War!" (2016)
- "I Can't Slow Her Down" (2017)
- "Terrorism! (The Isis Crisis)" (2017)
- "Generation L(ost)" (2017)
- "Jean Is Gone" (2018)
- "Things Ain't Changed" (2020)
