= Stewart Henderson (poet) =

British poet and broadcaster

Stewart Henderson is a British poet and broadcaster. He writes for both adults and children. The Church Times has said of him: 'What Michael Morpurgo has done for children's fiction, Henderson has done for poetry'.

== Work ==
Henderson's poetry, which is often humorous, sometimes adopts the perspective of a child struggling to understand more about their place in the universe. His work has been anthologized and adopted as curriculum in primary schools in the UK. He was shortlisted for the Scottish Children's Book Awards for Who Left Grandad at the Chipshop?

Since 2006, Henderson has been the host of BBC Radio 4's Questions, Questions. He was instrumental in the production of From Hairnets To Goalnets, a documentary on Britain’s first women’s football team. Other programmes he has worked on include Poetry in Politics, the educational series Wide Awake At Bedtime, and The Holy Fire which was shot on location in Israel and won the Jerusalem Radio Award for Best Feature in 2006.

Henderson is also a songwriter, working and occasionally performing with Martyn Joseph.

== Biography ==
- bbc.co.uk
- "Stewart Henderson - Contributors - Greenbelt Festival". Archived from the original on 2013-06-17.
- "Lion Hudson: Stewart Henderson". Archived from the original on 2014-12-02.
