= Harry Baker (poet) =

British spoken-word artist, author and poet

- Born: 1992 (age 33–34); London, England, U.K.
- Education: Bristol University
- Occupations: Spoken-word artist, author and poet
- Writing career
- Subject: Poetry
- Notable work: Wonderful (2025)

Harry Baker is a British spoken-word artist, author and poet.

== Early life ==
Born in Ealing in 1992, Harry Baker grew up as part of a Christian community in West London. After switching from studying Medicine to allow his pursuit of poetry, Baker studied Mathematics with German at Bristol University, graduating with a 2:2.

== Career ==
=== 2012 to present ===
Baker has won the London and UK Slam Poetry Championships. In 2012, he won the World Slam Poetry Competition, becoming the youngest ever winner.

In 2014, Baker began performing as a speaker for TED. His talk "A love poem for lonely prime numbers" has had more than 2 million views.

A collection of his own poetry, The Sunshine Kid, was published in 2015 by Burning Eye Books.

Baker received major national airplay on the BBC in 2015 when he wrote and performed a poem for Simon Mayo's Radio 2 show.

On Boxing Day 2016, Baker performed a Christmas Meditation on BBC Radio 4. He occasionally performs as a battle rapper, featuring on Don't Flop.

Together with the jazz guitarist Chris Read, Baker is half of "Harry and Chris", who have performed on The Russell Howard Hour television programme.

In 2026, the comedian Helen Lederer performed Baker's poem 'Sunflowers' in honour of the late Tony Slattery

Baker's work has been described dismissively by The Times newspaper as "Pot Noodle Poetry", whilst another review says his work "oozes joy."

Baker is well known as an aficionado of wine gums, and has many poems on the topic.

== Personal life ==
Baker is a practising Christian, and is a father. In 2026, Baker was described by Premier Christianity magazine as a Christian poet who is "cutting through with messages of hope".

Following a tip from Martin Lewis, Baker bought a roll of 10,000 stamps during the COVID-19 pandemic. In 2026, it was revealed that Baker made a profit of nearly £10,000 on his purchase.

== Books ==
- The Sunshine Kid (Burning Eye Books, 2013)
- Unashamed (Burning Eye Books, 2022)
- Wonderful (Burning Eye Books, 2024)
- Tender (2026, Cannongate)
