= Dark Matter (IQ album) =

Studio album by IQ
- Released: 29 June 2004
- Recorded: January - April 2004
- Genres: Neo-progressive rock Progressive metal
- Length: 52:16
- Label: Giant Electric Pea
- Producer: Michael Holmes

IQ chronology
| The Archive Collection: IQ20 (2003) | Dark Matter (2004) | Frequency (2009) |

Professional ratings
Review scores
| Source | Rating |
|---|---|
| AllMusic | 4/5 stars |
| DPRP | (9.5/10) (mean) |
| Metal.de | 9/10 |
| Rock Hard | 9/10 |
| Scream Magazine | 6/6 stars |

Dark Matter is a studio album by the British neo-progressive band IQ, released in 2004. It is the last album to feature founding member Martin Orford as he had left the band and music industry by 2009 and drummer Paul Cook, until his returning on The Road of Bones.

== Track listing ==
All lyrics are written by Peter Nicholls; all music is composed by IQ.

| No. | Title | Length |
|---|---|---|
| 1. | "Sacred Sound" | 11:40 |
| 2. | "Red Dust Shadow" | 5:53 |
| 3. | "You Never Will" | 4:54 |
| 4. | "Born Brilliant" | 5:20 |
| 5. | "Harvest of Souls: "I. First of the Last"; "II. The Wrong Host"; "III. Nocturne"; "IV. Frame and Form"; "V. Mortal Procession"; "VI. Frame and Form"; "VII. Ghosts of Days"" | 24:29 |
| Total length: | | 52:16 |

== Personnel ==
- Peter Nicholls – lead and backing vocals
- Martin Orford – keyboards, backing vocals
- Mike Holmes – guitars
- John Jowitt – bass, backing vocals
- Paul Cook – drums and percussion
