= Frequency (IQ album) =

Studio album by IQ
- Released: May 2009
- Recorded: June 2007 – February 2009
- Studio: Aubitt, Southampton and Redbridge, Bolton
- Genre: Neo-prog
- Length: 62:00
- Label: Inside Out Music
- Producer: Michael Holmes

IQ chronology
Dark Matter (2004)	Frequency (2009)	The Road of Bones (2014)

Frequency is the tenth studio album by the British neo-prog band IQ, released in May 2009 by Inside Out Music. Recorded at Aubitt Studios in Southampton and Redbridge Studios in Bolton from June 2007 to February 2009, it was produced by guitarist Michael Holmes. It was the first and only album recorded with new group members, keyboardist Mark Westworth and drummer Andy Edwards, as well as the last with bass guitarist John Jowitt.

== Critical reception ==
Professional ratings
Review scores
Source	Rating
AllMusic	3.5/5 stars

In a three-and-a-half-star review, Alex Henderson of AllMusic has referred to Frequency as "a very moody" but at the same time "also very accessible" album, concluding that despite substantial line-up changes, "it illustrates IQ's ability to continue providing memorable and very digestible progressive rock 28 years after the band's formation".

== Track listing ==
All lyrics are written by Peter Nicholls; all music is composed by IQ.

No.	Title	Length
1.	"Frequency"	8:29
2.	"Life Support"	6:28
3.	"Stronger Than Friction"	10:32
4.	"One Fatal Mistake"	4:54
5.	"Ryker Skies"	9:45
6.	"The Province"	13:42
7.	"Closer"	8:10
Total length:		62:00

== Personnel ==
=== IQ ===
- Peter Nicholls – lead vocals, backing vocals; photography
- Michael Holmes – guitars, keyboards; producer
- John Jowitt – bass guitar
- Mark Westworth – keyboards
- Andy Edwards – drums, percussion

=== Technical personnel ===
- Rob Aubrey – engineer
- Tony Lythgoe – design, artwork, photography
- Mark Hughes – photography
- Andy Labrow – photography
- Gill Whelan – photography
- Dene Wilby – band portraits
