= Subterranea (album) =

Studio album by IQ
- Released: 1997
- Recorded: July 1997 – August 1997
- Genre: Neo-prog
- Length: 102:34
- Label: Giant Electric Pea
- Producer: Mike Holmes

IQ chronology
Ever (1993)	Subterranea (1997)	Seven Stories into '98 (1998)

Professional ratings
Review scores
Source	Rating
AllMusic	4.5/5 stars

Subterranea is a double album by British progressive rock band IQ, which was released in 1997.

== Story ==
Subterranea is about a man who's been the subject of an experiment. He's been held captive, almost like sensory deprivation, throughout his whole life and he doesn't have any contact with the outside world (Provider). At the end of Provider, a grating sound is heard, which represents where he escapes or is let loose. It's not clear if he really escapes or is let out on purpose, as part of the experiment. Band members have given various explanations. Martin Orford explained, "As part of the experiment after all the sensory deprivation, he's let loose in the outside world. So he goes off into the outside world, all the time being monitored by these people.". Either way, what happens is the central character doesn't know why he is imprisoned. He doesn't know why he's released and he is exposed to all this sensory overload, all these sights and sounds and smells that he's never experienced before. He has to digest all these things (cars, buildings, television, etc.) in one overwhelming sensation (Subterranea). After some hard times among the homeless and hobos (Sleepless Incidental) he gets involved with a religious cult who try to take him in, because they see him as being easy prey. They try to give his life meaning because he doesn't know what is going on, but he refuses to be converted by them (Failsafe).

He meets a girl – her name being 'Maya', according to the liner notes and various lyrics at the end of the album – and falls in love with her. He has a deep friendship and romance with Maya, who names him (Speak My Name), but in the end she is taken away from him (Tunnel Vision). According to some explanations, she is killed by the people who held him prisoner. There's a lot of anger at that point and then he realises that he's being followed. All the time he's being watched and he manages to get hold of the person watching him. The experimentee kills him out of anger, but not before forcing the stalker to reveal the name of the man who is responsible for his misery (Mockenrue) (Infernal Chorus). Not being able to handle his situation, the central character retreats into his own mind, which is basically what King of Fools explains. Then there's a period of quiet reflection, The Sense in Sanity, where he tries to work out what's happening, followed by a rush back to reality with State of Mine.

On the second disc of the album he comes to realise that he's part of some form of experiment and that he's been kept away for some reason, so he needs to know why that happened (Breathtaker). At a certain point he takes on a 'disguise' to be able to find out what's behind all of this, and manages to kill more of the agents following him whilst making it look like an accident (Capricorn). Along the way he also realises that life in the outside world is much harder than his earlier, controlled life (Unsolid Ground). As the story moves on, he realises that he's not the only victim of the experiment (Somewhere in Time); there are others who all carry the same mark, the strange symbol which is a recurring theme on the CD sleeve (the square IQ logo which is the tattoo on the arm of the man on the Sleepless Incidental page in the Subterranea notebook).

Mockenrue's victims decide to band together and take revenge (High Waters), but their captors are one step ahead. They herd the experimentees all into an old building and set fire to it in an attempt to destroy the experiment's evidence (The Narrow Margin). In a dramatic confrontation, the main character meets the person responsible for locking him away. In the final scene, the central character is the only survivor and he, in a different sense, resigns himself to going back into the same isolation where he started, making the album's story go full circle. The album starts with him being on his own and not knowing why he's there or what's going on and ends with him at peace with himself because he's experienced, himself, so many terrible things and he wants to be alone again. So he returns to a place of isolation, which isn't specified.

== Track listing ==
All music by IQ, all lyrics by Peter Nicholls.

=== Disc 1 ===
No.	Title	Length
1.	"Overture"	4:38
2.	"Provider"	1:36
3.	"Subterranea"	5:53
4.	"Sleepless Incidental"	6:23
5.	"Failsafe"	8:57
6.	"Speak My Name"	3:35
7.	"Tunnel Vision"	7:24
8.	"Infernal Chorus"	5:10
9.	"King of Fools"	2:02
10.	"The Sense in Sanity"	4:48
11.	"State of Mine"	1:59

=== Disc 2 ===
No.	Title	Length
1.	"Laid Low"	1:29
2.	"Breathtaker"	6:04
3.	"Capricorn"	5:16
4.	"The Other Side"	2:22
5.	"Unsolid Ground"	5:04
6.	"Somewhere in Time"	7:11
7.	"High Waters"	2:43
8.	"The Narrow Margin"	20:00

== Personnel ==
- Peter Nicholls – lead and backing vocals
- Mike Holmes – guitar and guitar synth
- John Jowitt – bass guitar and backing vocals
- Martin Orford – keyboards and backing vocals
- Paul Cook – drums and percussion

== Adaptations ==
A film adaptation of the album was produced by the American film company Birdman Films and released in the United States in 2016.

The soundtrack to the film is said to feature songs from the album, with additional material written by IQ specially for this project. However, it was released as a solo Mike Holmes album instead.
