= Matthew Jay =

English singer-songwriter

- Born: Graham Matthew Jay; 10 October 1978; Plymouth, England
- Died: 25 September 2003 (aged 24) Willesden, London, England
- Genres: Indie rock Folk-pop
- Occupation: Singer-songwriter
- Years active: 1999–2003
- Labels: Food Records/EMI; Capitol Records; Jays Music Ltd
- Website: Official Facebook

Graham Matthew Jay (10 October 1978 – 25 September 2003) was an English singer-songwriter.

Signed to EMI imprint Food Records in 1999, Jay released his debut album, Draw, in 2001. He died in the early hours of 25 September 2003 from a fall from his seventh-floor flat in Willesden, London. A posthumous album Further Than Tomorrow was released in 2008.

== Career ==
Jay was born in Plymouth, England, the son of two folk musicians, his mother Hilary from Newcastle upon Tyne and his father Tony from Wolverhampton. The family moved to Abergavenny, South Wales when he was ten due to his civil engineering father's work. Jay played bass in his parents folk band with his brother Eddy, and began song writing his own material at the age of 15. At the time his primary influences included The Beatles, Queen, David Bowie and The Beach Boys. Commenting on the music scene in Abergavenny, Jay commented that "I was into whatever I could buy at Woolworth's. They never had anything, you always had to order it. You have to remember that Abergavenny is a place where the music scene amounts to one room with sawdust on the floor, where they play 'Wonderwall' at the end of every night".

In August 1998, after submitting his demos to several record companies and managers Jay met Martyn Watson. Watson had been in several bands in the past including Pookah Makes Three and Twelfth Night, and was currently half of the ambient electronic duo International Peoples Gang (IPG) with Ric Peet as well as working as an A&R agent. Watson stated that "the demo was easily the most original thing that had landed on my desk. I called him, expecting him to be thirty five because it sounded so mature. When I found out he was nineteen, a light went on in my head". He then moved to Nottingham where Watson was based, initially recording material by himself, and signed to EMI subsidiary Food Records a year later.

Jay worked in studios in Nottingham that were primarily used by DJs with International Peoples Gang and Tony Global co-producing, which brought an electronic influence to some of the songs he was working on. He then first enlisted local Nottingham rhythm section drummer Matt Klose and bassist Garf to work with in the studio. He later recruited former Six by Seven guitarist Sam Hempton, who features on album track Remember This Feeling, and keyboardist Olli Cunningham for live work. In 2000, Jay released the critically acclaimed EPs Four Songs and Friendly Fire.

In April 2001, Jay released his debut album Draw, from which three singles were taken: "Let Your Shoulder Fall", "Please Don't Send Me Away" and "Call My Name Out". Press soon drew comparisons between Jay and such musicians as Nick Drake, Elliott Smith, Jeff Buckley and David Gray. Whilst touring the album, Jay supported Doves, Starsailor, Lowgold, Stereophonics and Dido. Towards the end of the album touring cycle, Jay and his band debuted a new song, "Stars On The Floor". Other new songs that Jay had been working on and recorded with his band in December 2001 included "Bad Thing" and "All This Time". When commenting on new material, Jay stated that " I've got a band now and I want to be a bit more punk, a bit more Stonesy. You can't shut people up with an acoustic guitar". Later in 2002, the band debuted further new songs including "Closing the Factory Down", "The World Knows" and "Casual User". Jay only performed one gig in 2002, with members of his backing band engaging in their own projects. Drummer Matt Klose and bassist Garf toured with their own band Mova, whilst keyboardist Olli Cunningham toured with Lee Hazlewood. Two other planned appearances that year were cancelled at the last minute, due to "unforeseen circumstances".

In August 2002, Jay parted ways with EMI and subsequently with his manager Martyn Watson and backing band. Suggesting there were problems with the label earlier, a couple of months after the release of Draw Jay warned on stage prior to playing his then-upcoming single Please Don't Send Me Away that "you've got to make this go Top 75 at least, or else I'll get dropped". It charted at 83 and dropped out of the charts the next week. The label rejected the initial work done for his second album, which was recorded with his backing band, and decided he needed to work with outside collaborators. During this time he worked with a number of established songwriters on songs which remain unreleased, including Guy Chambers on the song Waiting For The Weekend, Tim Hawes and Pete Kirtley on She's At It Again and Naked and Busted songwriting team Steve Robson, John McLaughlin, Charlie Simpson and James Bourne on She Knows. This work was also ultimately rejected and EMI didn't renew his contract.

Commenting on the split from EMI, Jay's by then-former manager Watson stated that "I think that it's a real shame how things have turned out ... we were onto a winner but somehow the project lost its way. I hope that Matthew gets a new deal, makes the music that we all know he is capable of and finds true happiness". Jay's album and single releases were the last to be issued via Food, before the label was wound down and subsumed into Parlophone after EMI took full control.

Shortly after parting ways with EMI, Jay returned to his parents home in Abergavenny having seemingly decided to abandon the music industry. His father stated that he "had recently spent a few months living with us during an interruption to his chosen career. He had recently decided to return to his career and was reportedly writing well and preparing for a new album". Jay then moved to London to study for a master's degree in Audio Production at the University of Westminster, and continued working on material for his second album. However, the work was not completed.

== Death ==
In the early hours of 25 September 2003, Jay fell from a flat on St Pauls Avenue in Willesden, North London. He was taken to Northwick Park Hospital where he later died.

Jay's death was initially assumed to be suicide, with a statement from EMI claiming that "his act would appear to have been an impulsive gesture following a professionally difficult year and perhaps, a difficult day". Jay's family released a statement which claimed that "it is understood that there was nobody with him in the room at the time and no note was left". The statement also incorrectly stated that he had died in the late hours of 24 September, and not the early hours of the following day.

It was later revealed that two other people were present in the flat on the evening of Jay's death, and one of these people was still being sought by police to obtain a statement. In 2005, his parents issued an appeal for Mahmoud Rahman, an acquaintance of Jay's who visited the flat on the night, believed to be the last person to speak to him to contact them or the police. Jay was not known to have been depressed, and he had spoken cheerfully to his family earlier the same evening.

An inquest into his death returned an open verdict.

== Posthumous works ==
In August 2004, Jay's parents set up their own record label Jays Music and released the non-album track collection Matthew Jay: Too Soon, with backing from EMI. The collection brought together early EP tracks and B-sides.

On 24 September 2006, What Would Love Do Now?, reportedly the last song he had written prior to his death, was released digitally as a single.

In June 2007, EMI transferred the rights to the promotional videos for all three of Jay's single releases to Jay's family who made the videos available for download. All profits from the sale of the video downloads went to the UNICEF Born Free from HIV campaign, as UNICEF was a charity that their son had supported.

On 30 June 2008, Further Than Tomorrow a collection of the songs that Jay had been working on prior to his death was released. The CD which was sold exclusively for sale via Amazon.co.uk sold out in one day. Jay's family had originally tried to complete the album several years earlier, but plans were stalled due to lack of funds when it was estimated that it would cost around £50,000 to complete. However, they were later contacted by KPM, which was at the time a division of EMI which provided soundtracks worldwide for film, TV and advertising who wanted to complete Jay's unfinished work. The tracks were completed by producer Vasco and musicians including Jay's brother Eddy, who overdubbed over Jay's original home demos. Vasco commented that "having done my best to arrange the songs in the manner suggested by what had been left behind, I stood poised with the rest of the band, guitar in hand ready to record as the count-in came over the headphones. Fortunately, Matthew had recorded his voice really well, so we were able to build the album around it. What followed was one of the most enjoyable recording sessions I have ever been involved in". The works met similar critical acclaim to Jay's earlier releases, securing airplay on key radio stations, and a high ranking in respected music publications, including Q, who made "She Didn't Understand" their track of the Day. Jay's mother Hilary admitted that whilst the album "would not be exactly as he would have done it but I think they have done an excellent job and I’m very grateful to all of them". The tracks had previously been released digitally in 2007 by KPM, under the title Independent Mind with the additional track "Break-Up At The Seaside", and some of the original song titles intact which Jay's family changed prior to commercial release (for instance "Chaos" was originally titled "Thoughts Of My Own Demise" and "Nothing Seems Good Enough" originally "Casual User").

An additional digital single "Our Time" was released the same year. The song was written by Jay when he was 18 and recorded in 2000 for EMI with the possibility of it being issued as a single prior to the release of Draw.

On 10 October 2008, on what would have been Jay's 30th birthday, a tribute concert was held at Shepherd's Bush Empire, London to celebrate the music of Matthew Jay. Artists including Jay's backing band, Starsailor frontman James Walsh, Squeeze frontman Chris Difford and Passenger (Mike Rosenberg) each performed one of Jay's songs, as well as showcasing their own work. All profits were donated to Amnesty International and UNICEF.

On 10 October 2011, another previously unreleased song Dear Jane was released digitally. The song was one of the last written by Jay, and had been written to a friend who had attempted suicide.

On 10 October 2012, another previously unreleased song Holy Details was released digitally.

Other currently unreleased songs include An Older Girl, Home Again, I Have A Shell, (I Only) Meant To Say, Jelly Bullet, Sarah, Take On and What Is The Sky Doing.

== Discography ==
=== Albums ===
- Draw (April 2001 in UK, August 2001 in USA – EMI) CD/LP (Re-released in the UK in June 2001 with alternative artwork)
- Too Soon (August 2004 memorial album of b-sides and EP tracks – EMI/Jays Music Ltd) CD
- Further Than Tomorrow (June 2008 – Jays Music Ltd) CD

=== EPs ===
- Four Songs (January 2000 in UK) CD
- Friendly Fire (May 2000 in UK) CD
- Four Minute Rebellion EP (2000 in USA) CD

=== Singles ===
- Let Your Shoulder Fall (March 2001 in UK) Format: CD/7"
- Please Don't Send Me Away (June 2001 in UK) Format: CD/7"
- Call My Name Out (November 2001 in UK) Format: CD/7"
- What Would Love Do Now (September 2006) Download
- Our Time (May 2008 – EMI/Jays Music Ltd) Download
