= Nomzamo (given name) =

- Gender: Female
- Language: Nguni languages

Other gender
- Masculine: Mzamo

Origin
- Meaning: Endeavour, Trial, Effort,

Other names
- Variant form: Zama
- Short form: Zamo

Nomzamo is a feminine given name. Notable people with the name include:

- Nomzamo Winifred Zanyiwe Madikizela (1936–2018), South African anti-apartheid activist
- Nomzamo Mbatha (born 1990), South African actress
- Nomzamo Zondo, South African human rights activist

== Music ==
- Nomzamo (album)

== Places ==
- Nomzamo, Western Cape, South Africa, a township
