= IQ (British band) =

British progressive rock band

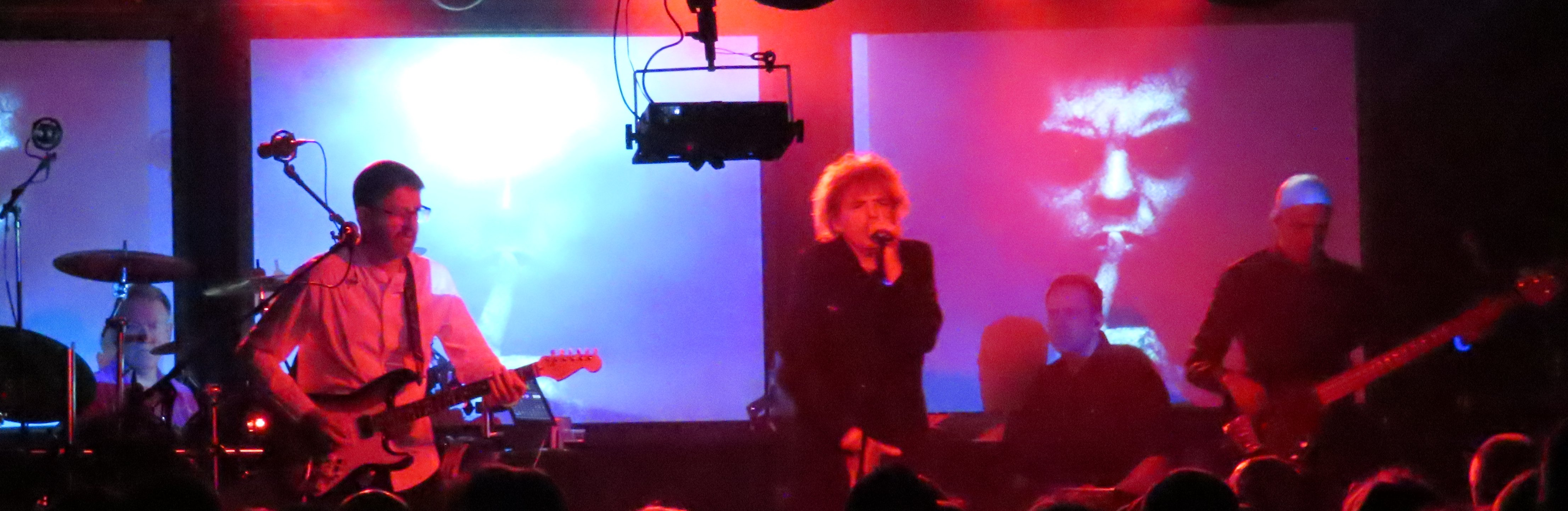
- IQ playing their "traditional" Christmas gig on 10 December 2019. L-R: Paul Cook Mike Holmes, Peter Nicholls, Neil Durant, and Tim Esau.

Background information
- Origin: Southampton, England
- Genre: Neo-prog
- Years active: 1981–present
- Labels: The Major Record Company; The Classic One Shoe Record Label; MSI; Sahara; Samurai; Squawk; Vertigo; Mercury; Giant Electric Pea; SPV; Inside Out
- Members: Mike Holmes; Peter Nicholls; Tim Esau; Paul Cook; Neil Durant
- Past members: Martin Orford; John Jowitt; Andy Edwards; Mark Westworth; Les Marshall; Paul Menel; Mark Ridout
- Website: www.iq-hq.co.uk

IQ are a British neo-prog band founded by Mike Holmes and Martin Orford in 1981 following the dissolution of their original band The Lens.

Although the band have never enjoyed major commercial success and had several lineup changes, IQ have built up a loyal following over the years and are still active as of 2025, currently with the original recording line-up (with the exception of Orford).

Throughout 2021 and 2022, IQ performed a series of concerts in the UK and Europe celebrating their 40th anniversary.

IQ was named one of "The 11 Best U.K. Prog Rock Groups of All Time" by Loudwire.

== Neo-progressive movement ==
IQ were one of a number of British bands formed during the early 1980s, including Marillion, Pendragon, Twelfth Night, Pallas and Solstice, that continued with the progressive rock style forsaken by 1970s bands such as Genesis and Yes. The music press have subsequently coined the phrase neo-progressive to describe these bands (although this term was never used contemporaneously with the movement as described in Martin Orford's essay referenced below), often accusing them of simply copying the styles of other bands. This accusation has been strenuously denied by Martin Orford, who is against the use of the term "neo progressive" and claims the band have wide-ranging and eclectic selection of musical influences. Paul Stump's History of Progressive Rock, while affirming the band's categorization as neo-progressive, argued that IQ "did at least offer a more individual palette which, while just as derivative [as Marillion] in its way, gave the impression that the choice of arrangements was indivisible from the choice of notes played – that the similarities with older bands arose accidentally from their own personal approach to music." [emphasis in original]

== Line-up ==
From 1982, the line-up consisted of Peter Nicholls (vocals), Mike Holmes (guitar), Martin Orford (keyboards), Paul Cook (not to be confused with the Sex Pistols' drummer of the same name) (drums), and Tim Esau (bass). Nicholls left in July 1985 to form a new band, Niadem's Ghost, and was replaced by Paul (P. L.) Menel, but subsequently returned in 1990. Nicholls also created the cover art for most of the albums on which he appears. In early 2005, member Paul Cook left the band and was replaced on drums by Andy Edwards (ex Robert Plant drummer). On 20 July 2007, Martin Orford announced that he was leaving IQ and he was replaced by Mark Westworth from prog-rock band Darwin's Radio. In late 2009, Paul Cook returned to replace Andy Edwards. On 7 October 2010, Mark Westworth announced on the band's official web site that he would be leaving the band and his final appearance with IQ was on 11 December 2010. On 1 January 2011, the band announced that Westworth's replacement on keyboards would be Neil Durant, from instrumental prog-fusion band Sphere³. On 7 January 2011, bassist of 19 years John Jowitt announced on the band's website that he had left the band, and that his last appearance with the band had also been the concert on 11 December 2010. He was replaced by original bassist Tim Esau in January 2011.

== Musical style ==
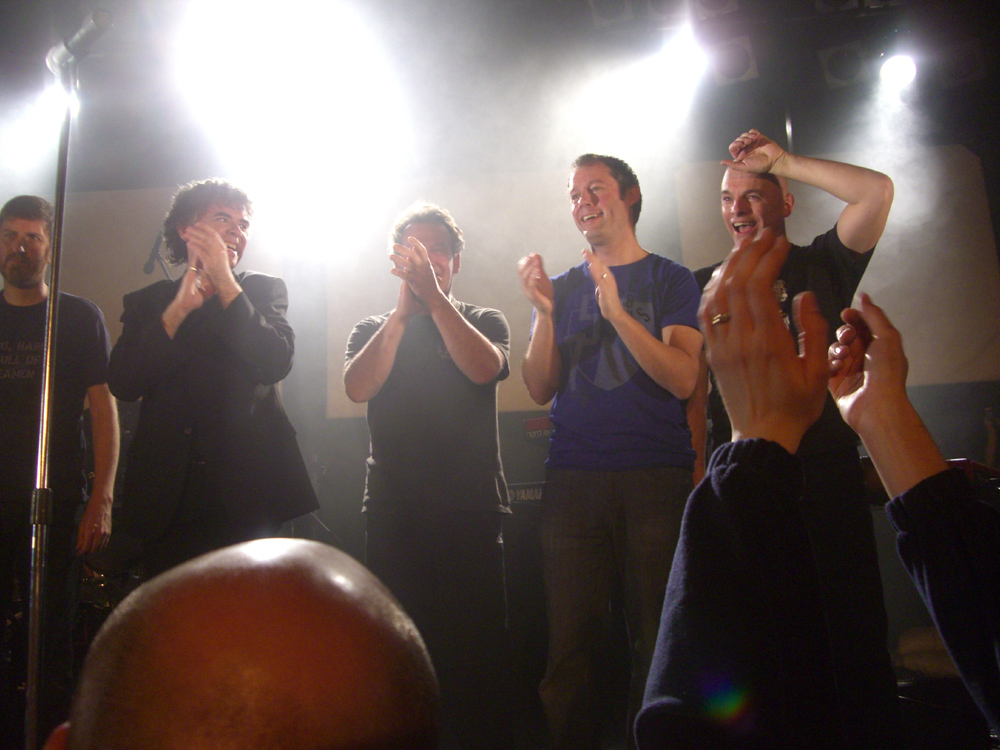
At The Classic Rock Society Awards Night, 16 January 2010. The band had won Band of the Year and Best Album for Frequency. L-R: Holmes, Nicholls, Cook, Westworth, Jowitt

The band's musical style, especially earlier in their career, was reminiscent of Genesis during the era of Peter Gabriel and Steve Hackett because of singer Peter Nicholls' similarities in vocal and stage presence to Gabriel and keyboardist Martin Orford's grandiose keyboarding. However, guitarist Mike Holmes' role was far more assertive in the band, giving them a harder edge musically. After Nicholls' departure, the band's style became increasingly commercial and radio-friendly — albeit without much success — on Nomzamo (1987) and Are You Sitting Comfortably? (1989), although each album still featured some progressive rock-style tracks. Beginning with the return of Nicholls on 1993's Ever, the band returned to its prog rock roots, with longer tracks featuring intricate arrangements and complex musicianship.

== Personnel ==
=== Members ===
Current members

- Mike Holmes – guitars, keyboards (1981–present), backing vocals (2011–present)
- Tim Esau – bass guitar, bass pedals (1981–1989, 2011–present), backing vocals (2011–present)
- Peter Nicholls – lead and backing vocals (1982–1985, 1989–present)
- Paul Cook – drums (1982–2005, 2009–present)
- Neil Durant – keyboards (2011–present)

Former members

- Martin Orford – keyboards, backing and occasional lead vocals and flute (1981–2007)
- Mark Ridout – drums (1981–1982; died 2018)
- Paul Menel – vocals (1985–1989)
- Les 'Ledge' Marshall – bass guitar (1989–1990; his death)
- John Jowitt – bass guitar, backing vocals (1990–2010)
- Andy Edwards – drums (2005–2009)
- Mark Westworth – keyboards (2007–2010)

=== Lineups ===
N.B. bold = lineup change; * = returning band member

1981–1982	1982	1982–1985	1985–1989
**Mike Holmes** – guitars; **Martin Orford** – keyboards, lead vocals; **Tim Esau** – bass; **Mark Ridout** – drums	**Peter Nicholls** – lead vocals; Mike Holmes – guitars; Martin Orford – keyboards, backing vocals; Tim Esau – bass; Mark Ridout – drums	Peter Nicholls – lead vocals; Mike Holmes – guitars; Martin Orford – keyboards, backing vocals; Tim Esau – bass; **Paul Cook** – drums	**Paul Menel** – lead vocals; Mike Holmes – guitars; Martin Orford – keyboards, backing vocals; Tim Esau – bass; Paul Cook – drums
1989–1990	1990–2005	2005–2007	2007–2009
**Peter Nicholls*** – lead vocals; Mike Holmes – guitars; Martin Orford – keyboards, backing vocals; **Les Marshall** – bass; Paul Cook – drums	Peter Nicholls – lead vocals; Mike Holmes – guitars; Martin Orford – keyboards, backing vocals; **John Jowitt** – bass, backing vocals; Paul Cook – drums	Peter Nicholls – lead vocals; Mike Holmes – guitars; Martin Orford – keyboards, backing vocals; John Jowitt – bass, backing vocals; **Andy Edwards** – drums	Peter Nicholls – lead vocals; Mike Holmes – guitars; **Mark Westworth** – keyboards; John Jowitt – bass, backing vocals; Andy Edwards – drums
2009–2010	2011–present
Peter Nicholls – lead vocals; Mike Holmes – guitars; Mark Westworth – keyboards; John Jowitt – bass, backing vocals; **Paul Cook*** – drums	Peter Nicholls – lead vocals; Mike Holmes – guitars, backing vocals; **Neil Durant** – keyboards; **Tim Esau*** – bass, backing vocals; Paul Cook – drums

== Discography ==
=== Albums ===
- Tales from the Lush Attic (1983)
- The Wake (1985)
- Nomzamo (1987)
- Are You Sitting Comfortably? (1989)
- Ever (1993)
- Subterranea (1997)
- Seven Stories into '98 (1998)
- The Seventh House (2000)
- Dark Matter (2004)
- Frequency (2009)
- The Road of Bones (2014)
- Resistance (2019)
- Dominion (2025)

=== Compilations ===
- Seven Stories into Eight (1982 demo cassette)
- Nine in a Pond is Here (1985) ("official bootleg" of demos etc., CD version is abridged)
- The Lost Attic (1999) (rarities)
- Limited edition Frequency Tour CD 1 (2008) (rarities and live tracks)
- Limited edition Frequency Tour CD 2 (2008) (rarities and live tracks)
- The Archive Collection: Tales from a Dark Christmas (2017)
- The Archive Collection (2022) (all archive releases from 2003 to 2017 - plus)
- Almost But Not Quite (2025) (single edits)

=== Singles ===
- "Barbell Is In" (1984)
- "Corners" (1985)
- "Passing Strangers" (1987)
- "Promises (As the Years Go By)" (1987)
- "Sold on You" (1989)

=== Live albums ===
- Living Proof (1986)
- J'ai Pollette d'Arnu (1991) (b-sides and live tracks)
- Forever Live (1996)
- Subterranea: The Concert (2000)
- The Archive Collection: IQ20 (2003) ("official bootleg" of live concert)
- The Wake: Live at De Boerderij (2010)
- The Archive Collection: IQ30 (2012) ("official bootleg" of live concert)
- The Archive Collection: Live on The Road of Bones (2016)
- The Archive Collection: A Show of Resistance (2020)
- The Archive Collection #11: IQ40 - Forty years of Prog Nonsense (2022) ("official bootleg" of live concert)
- Subterranea: Live At Boerderij October 22, 2011 (2023) ("official bootleg" of live concert)
- The Archive Collection: The IQ Weekender 2024 Box Set (2024) (box set of two "official bootlegs" of live concerts)
- Riding The Frequency - 'Frequency Live in Poland' (2026)
- Live From London - Camden Palace 1985 (2026)

=== Videos ===
- Forever Live (VHS/CD set 1996, DVD set 2007)
- Subterranea: The Concert (DVD, 2000)
- IQ20 - The Twentieth Anniversary Show (DVD 2004)
- Live from London (DVD, recorded 13 May 1985 in London, 2005)
- IQ Stage (DVD, 2006)
- Forever Live (DVD, 2007)
- The Wake in Concert (DVD, 2010)
- Scrape Across the Sky (Blu-ray, 2017)
- Live Like This (Blu-ray, 2021)
