= Seven Stories into Eight =

Demo album by IQ
- Released: October 1982
- Recorded: 1981–1982
- Genre: Neo-prog
- Length: 43:31
- Label: self released/independent
- Producer: IQ

IQ chronology
Seven Stories into Eight (1982)	Tales from the Lush Attic (1983)

Professional ratings
Review scores
Source	Rating
Allmusic	1.5/5 stars

Seven Stories into Eight is a demo album by the Neo-prog band IQ. It was released in 1982 on cassette. In 1998, a new version of this work (Seven Stories into '98) was released as a studio album.

== Track listing ==
No.	Title	Length
1.	"Capital Letters (In Surgical Spirit Land)"	3:46
2.	"About Lake Five"	5:02
3.	"Intelligence Quotient"	6:55
4.	"For Christ’s Sake" (Live)"	5:05
5.	"Barbell Is In"	5:32
6.	"Fascination"	5:56
7.	"For The Taking"	4:17
8.	"It All Stops Here"	6:58

== Personnel ==
- Peter Nicholls – lead vocals (tracks 6–8)
- Mike Holmes – acoustic, electric & twelve-string guitars
- Martin Orford – keyboards, lead vocals (tracks 3 & 5)
- Tim Esau – bass guitar
- Mark Ridout – drums, percussion (tracks 1, 3 & 4)
- Paul Cook – drums, percussion (all other tracks)
