= The Road of Bones (album) =

Studio album by IQ
- Released: 3 May 2014
- Recorded: 2013
- Studios: Aubitt Studios, Southampton
- Genres: Neo-prog, progressive metal
- Length: 102:09
- Label: Giant Electric Pea
- Producer: Michael Holmes

IQ chronology
Frequency (2009)	The Road of Bones (2014)	Resistance (2019)

The Road of Bones is the eleventh studio album by the British neo-prog band IQ, released on May 3, 2014. It peaked at number 36 in Germany on the Offizielle Deutsche Charts, number 62 in Switzerland on the Swiss Hitparade and number 68 in the Netherlands on the Dutch Charts. It's the first album to feature Neil Durant on keyboards and it marks the return of original members Paul Cook on drums and Tim Esau on bass, the latter's first appearance on an IQ album since 1989.

The album marked a development in the band's sound, as they began to experiment with more aggressive musical passages, while maintaining their familiar earlier sound.

Professional ratings
Review scores
Source	Rating
Rock Hard	8.5/10 stars

== Track listing ==
All lyrics are written by Peter Nicholls; all music is composed by IQ.

Disc 1
No.	Title	Length
1.	"From the Outside In"	7:25
2.	"The Road of Bones"	8:32
3.	"Without Walls"	19:15
4.	"Ocean"	5:43
5.	"Until the End"	12:00

Disc 2
No.	Title	Length
1.	"Knucklehead"	8:11
2.	"1312 Overture"	4:18
3.	"Constellations"	12:25
4.	"Fall and Rise"	7:10
5.	"Ten Million Demons"	6:10
6.	"Hardcore"	10:53

The Road of Bonus
No.	Title	Length
1.	"From the Outside In (First Studio Run Through)"	7:25
2.	"The Road of Bones (First Studio Run Through)"	8:36
3.	"Ocean (Piano / Vocal Version)"	5:53
4.	"The Slender Sky"	13:56
5.	"McDozenStrings"	4:08
6.	"Without Walls (Live Medley)"	12:45
7.	"From the Outside In (Live)"	7:51

== Personnel ==
- Peter Nicholls – lead, backing vocals
- Mike Holmes – guitars
- Neil Durant – keyboards
- Tim Esau – bass, bass pedals
- Paul Cook – drums, percussion
