= The Archive Collection: IQ20 =

Live album by IQ
- Released: 2003
- Recorded: 16 February 2002 at the Colos-Saal, in Aschaffenburg, Germany
- Genre: Progressive rock
- Length: 120:53
- Label: Giant Electric Pea
- Producer: Michael Holmes

IQ chronology
The Seventh House (2000)	The Archive Collection: IQ20 (2003)	Dark Matter (2004)

Professional ratings
Review scores
Source	Rating
DPRP	(7.5/10)

The Archive Collection: Volume 1 – IQ20 is a live album by British progressive rock band IQ released in 2003. The album is the first installment of a series of original bootlegs releases, and was recorded on 16 February 2002 at the Colos-Saal, in Aschaffenburg, Germany, during IQ's 20th anniversary tour.

== Track listing ==
=== Disc one ===
1. "Intro (Hedwig's Theme)" - 3:56
2. "Awake and Nervous" - 8:32
3. "The Thousand Days" / "The Magic Roundabout" - 9:18
4. "The Wrong Side of Weird" - 13:02
5. "State of Mine" / "Leap of Faith" / "Came Down" - 10:46
6. "Erosion" - 7:18
7. "The Seventh House" - 14:56

=== Disc two ===
1. "The Narrow Margin" (Middle section) - 6:05
2. "Just Changing Hands" - 6:45
3. "Guiding Light" - 10:28
4. "The Last Human Gateway" - 22:08
5. "Subterranea" - 7:43

== Personnel ==
- Peter Nicholls – vocals
- Mike Holmes – electric guitar
- Martin Orford – keyboards
- Jon Jowitt – bass guitar
- Paul Cook – drums
