= Souvenir (disambiguation) =

A souvenir is an object a traveler brings home for the memories associated with it.

Souvenir(s) may also refer to:

== Film, theatre, and television ==
- Souvenir (1989 film), a British drama starring Christopher Plummer
- Souvenir, a 1996 film featuring Melvil Poupaud
- Souvenir, a 2006 film produced by Hanif Kureishi
- Souvenir (2016 film), a film directed by Bavo Defurne
- The Souvenir, a 2019 American-British drama film
- Souvenir (play), a 2005 play by Stephen Temperley
- "Souvenir" (Mad Men), an episode of the third season of the US television show Mad Men

== Music ==
=== Classical music ===
- Souvenir, composition by František Drdla (1868–1944)
- Souvenir, composition by László Sáry (born 1940)
- Souvenir, composition by John Cage
- Souvenir, composition by Frank Bridge (1879–1941)
- Souvenir, song by Édouard Lalo (1823–1892)
- Souvenir (Magnus Lindberg), a 2010 musical composition by Magnus Lindberg

=== Bands ===
- Souvenir (Spanish band), a Spanish indie pop/electro-pop band
- Souvenirs (duo), Danish musical duo

=== Albums ===
==== Souvenir ====
- Souvenir (Andy Sears album), 2011
- Souvenir (Eric Johnson album), 2002
- Souvenir (Kristy Thirsk album), 2003
- Souvenir (Sestre album)
- Souvenir (Banner Pilot album), 2014
- Souvenir (Miranda! album), 2021
- Souvenir (Omni album), 2024
- Souvenir (Pop Etc album)
- Souvenir: 1989—1998, a compilation by The Rankin Family
- Souvenir: The Ultimate Collection, a box set by Billy Joel
- Souvenir, an album by The Blakes
- Souvenir, an album by Ernesto Djédjé
- Souvenir, an album by Marlee Scott
- Souvenir: The Singles 2004–2012, a compilation by Kaiser Chiefs

==== Souvenirs ====
- Souvenirs, a poem for orchestra (1906) by Vincent d'Indy
- Souvenirs (The Country Gentlemen album), 1995
- Souvenirs (Dan Fogelberg album), 1974
- Souvenirs (Demis Roussos album), 1975
- Souvenirs (The Duke Spirit album), 2005
- Souvenirs (Emahoy Tsegué-Maryam album), 2024
- Souvenirs (The Gathering album), 2003
- Souvenirs (John Prine album), 2000
- Souvenirs (Tina Arena album)
- Souvenirs (Vince Gill album)
- Souvenirs, an album by Bettye LaVette
- Souvenirs, an album by Big Tom and The Mainliners
- Souvenirs, an album by Tosca
- Souvenirs, an album by White Heart
- Souvenirs, an album by Pussycat (band) which charted No.1 in New Zealand.

=== Songs ===
- "Souvenir" (song), a 1981 song by Orchestral Manoeuvres in the Dark
- "Souvenir", a song by Matia Bazar (1985)
- "Souvenir", a song by Boygenius, from the extended play Boygenius
- "Souvenir", a song by Bump of Chicken (2022)
- "Souvenir", a song by Selena Gomez, from the deluxe edition of the album Rare
- "Souvenir", a song by Billy Joel, from the album Streetlife Serenade
- "Souvenir", a song by Avril Lavigne, from the album Head Above Water
- "Souvenir", a song by Paul McCartney, from the album Flaming Pie
- "Souvenirs" (song), a 1959 song by Barbara Evans
- "Souvenirs", a song by Meat Loaf, from the album Braver Than We Are
- "Souvenirs", a song by John Prine, from the album Diamonds in the Rough
- "Souvenirs", a song by the Vels, from the album House of Miracles
- "Souvenirs", a song by Voyage
- "Souvenir", a 2025 song by Deftones from private music

== Other ==
- Souvenir (typeface), a font created in 1914
