= Seven Stories into '98 =

Studio album by IQ
- Released: 1998
- Recorded: 1981–1982 and 1998
- Genre: Neo-prog
- Length: 43:31
- Producer: IQ

IQ chronology
Subterranea (1997)	Seven Stories into '98 (1998)	The Seventh House (2000)

Professional ratings
Review scores
Source	Rating
AllMusic	2.5/5 stars

Seven Stories into '98 is an IQ album, released in 1998 as a new version of the demo album Seven Stories into Eight (1982).

== Track listing ==
=== 1998 version ===
Disc 1

No.	Title	Length
1.	"Capital Letters (In Surgical Spirit Land)"	3:49
2.	"About Lake Five"	5:26
3.	"Intelligence Quotient"	8:18
4.	"For Christ's Sake"	5:17
5.	"Barbell Is In"	4:53
6.	"Fascination"	7:03
7.	"For the Taking"	4:33
8.	"It All Stops Here"	7:53
9.	"Eloko Bella Neechi"	5:16

=== 1982 version ===
Disc 2

No.	Title	Length
1.	"Capital Letters (In Surgical Spirit Land)"	3:46
2.	"About Lake Five"	5:01
3.	"Intelligence Quotient"	6:55
4.	"For Christ's Sake"	5:05
5.	"Barbell Is In"	5:31
6.	"Fascination"	5:56
7.	"For the Taking"	4:17
8.	"It All Stops Here"	6:57
