= Revell (surname) =

Revell is a surname. Notable people with the surname include:

- Alex Revell (born 1983), English footballer
- Alexander Hamilton Revell (1858–1931), American businessman
- Andy Revell (born 1958), British businessman, scientist and musician
- Anthony Revell (1935–2018), British Royal Navy medical officer and Surgeon General of the British Armed Forces
- Ashley Revell (born 1971), English entrepreneur
- Charlie Revell (1919–1999), English footballer
- Donald Revell (born 1954), American poet, essayist, translator and professor
- Ernest John Revell (1934–2017), Scottish scholar, professor emeritus
- Fleur Revell (born 1972), New Zealand television personality and journalist
- Graeme Revell (born 1955), New Zealand musician and composer
- Guy Revell (1941–1981), Canadian pair skater
- Henry Revell (1767–1847), British politician
- Ian Revell (born 1948), New Zealand politician
- J. Revell Carr (born 1939), American author, historian, curator and museum director
- Jessica Revell (born 1994), English actress and singer
- Kim Revell (born 1975), Australian football player
- Louise Revell, British archaeologist
- Nellie Revell (1873–1958), American journalist, novelist, publicist, vaudeville performer
- Nick Revell, British comedian and writer
- Ray Revell (1911–1968), Australian speedcar driver
- Thomas Revell (died 1752), British victualler and politician
- Viljo Revell (1910–1964), Finnish architect

== See also ==
- Revell Eardley-Wilmot (1842–1922), British military officer
