= Nomzamo (album) =

Studio album by IQ
- Released: April 1987
- Recorded: January–February 1987
- Studio: Chipping Norton Recording, Chipping Norton, Oxfordshire, England
- Genre: Neo-prog, Pop rock
- Length: 48:13
- Label: Squawk
- Producer: Ken Thomas

IQ chronology
Living Proof (1986)	Nomzamo (1987)	Are You Sitting Comfortably? (1989)

Singles from Nomzamo
- 1. "Passing Strangers" Released: May 1987; 2. "Promises (As the Years Go By)" Released: August 1987

Professional ratings
Review scores
Source	Rating
AllMusic	3/5 stars

Nomzamo is the third studio album by the British neo-prog band IQ. It was released in April 1987 by Squawk Records and distributed by Mercury Records internationally, Vertigo Records in the United Kingdom, and Metronome in West Germany. Recorded at Chipping Norton Recording Studios in Chipping Norton, Oxfordshire, England, from January to February 1987, it was produced by Ken Thomas. It was the first disc recorded without lead singer Peter Nicholls, who was replaced by P.L. Menel.

== Track listing ==
All lyrics are written by P.L. Menel; all music is composed by IQ.

Side one
No.	Title	Length
1.	"No Love Lost"	6:03
2.	"Promises (As the Years Go By)"	4:34
3.	"Nomzamo"	7:01
4.	"Still Life"	5:58

Side two
No.	Title	Length
5.	"Passing Strangers"	3:48
6.	"Human Nature"	9:42
7.	"Screaming"	4:07
8.	"Common Ground"	7:00
Total length:		48:13

Original Cassette bonus track
No.	Title	Length
9.	"Colourflow"	5:27
Total length:		53:39

Original CD bonus tracks
No.	Title	Length
9.	"Colourflow"	5:27
10.	"No Love Lost" (piano/vocal version)	4:12
Total length:		57:52

1994 Giant Electric Pea reissue bonus tracks
No.	Title	Length
9.	"Colourflow"	5:27
10.	"No Love Lost" (piano/vocal version)	4:12
11.	"Common Ground" (live)	6:34
Total length:		64:26

== Personnel ==
=== IQ ===
- P.L. Menel – lead vocals, backing vocals
- Mike Holmes – electric and acoustic guitars, guitar synthesizer
- Tim Esau – bass guitar, bass pedals, rhythm guitar on "Passing Strangers", backing vocals
- Martin Orford – keyboards, backing vocals
- Paul Cook – drums, percussion

=== Additional musicians ===
- Micky Groome – backing vocals
- Ray Carless – saxophone
- Jules O'Kine – vocal duet on "Colourflow"

=== Technical personnel ===
- Ken Thomas – producer
- Barry Hammond – engineer (at Chipping Norton Recording Studios, Chipping Norton, Oxfordshire, England)
- Gerard Johnson – engineer (at Music Works Recording Studio, Kingston, Jamaica)
- Chris Morton – sleeve design
- Paul Cox – photography
