= Tales from the Lush Attic =

Studio album by IQ
- Released: 9 September 1983
- Recorded: 2–5 August 1983
- Studio: Flame (London)
- Genre: Neo-prog
- Length: 45:51
- Label: The Major Record Company
- Producer: IQ

IQ chronology
Seven Stories into Eight (1982)	Tales from the Lush Attic (1983)	The Wake (1985)

Tales from the Lush Attic, released in 1983, is the debut album by neo-prog group IQ, following the cassette-only demo Seven Stories into Eight. It was also among the first neo-progressive releases, alongside Marillion's Script for a Jester's Tear, released in the same year.

In the style of some classic progressive rock albums, Tales from the Lush Attic consists of one epic song filling out almost an entire side of the original vinyl and shorter songs composing the other side.

The Giant Electric Pea 2006 re-release features a bonus track, "Just Changing Hands", which is credited as running for 5:12 but in reality is 10:18 long and features a hidden track, a short nameless exotic sounding instrumental.

== Reception ==
Professional ratings
Review scores
Source	Rating
AllMusic	3/5 stars

In a retrospective review, Mike DeGagne of AllMusic commented that while the album is highly derivative of progressive rock-era Genesis, "there's an air to this album that gathers attention, especially on the synth-ridden passages." He praised the songs for running long enough for the listener to reflect on the playing, and the numerous unexpected changes in tempo. Paul Stump, in his History of Progressive Rock, commented that "the band are tight enough, and are redeemed by a sense of mission, self-belief and even fun", making particular note of the use of satire ("a commodity as rare as hen's teeth [in progressive rock]") in "My Baby Treats Me Right".

== Track listing ==
All songs written by IQ.

Side one
No.	Title	Length
1.	"The Last Human Gateway"	19:57
2.	"Through The Corridors"	2:35

Side two
No.	Title	Length
3.	"Awake and Nervous"	7:45
4.	"My Baby Treats Me Right 'Cos I'm A Hard Lovin' Man All Night Long"	1:45
5.	"The Enemy Smacks"	13:49

Bonus track included on the re-release by Giant Electric Pea
No.	Title	Length
6.	"Just Changing Hands" (actual music: 5:12)	10:18
Total length:		56:09

2013 Remix (30th Anniversary Collector's Edition)
No.	Title	Length
1.	"The Last Human Gateway"	20:20
2.	"Through The Corridors"	2:38
3.	"Awake and Nervous"	7:57
4.	"My Baby Treats Me Right 'Cos I'm A Hard Lovin' Man All Night Long"	1:51
5.	"The Enemy Smacks"	14:06
6.	"Wintertell (Demo" (In tracklist as "Just Changing Hands")	3:06
7.	"The Last Human Gateway (Demo)"	2:48
8.	"Just Changing Hands" (In tracklist as "Wintertell (Demo))	5:38
9.	"Dans Le Parc Du Chateau Noir (Demo)"	6:45
Total length:		01:03:57

- Tracks 6, 7 and 9 of the 2013 Remix had previously been unreleased.

== Personnel ==
- Peter Nicholls – vocals
- Mike Holmes – acoustic, electric and twelve-string guitars
- Martin Orford – keyboards
- Tim Esau – bass guitar
- Paul Cook – drums, percussion

== Production ==
- Arranged and produced by IQ
- Engineered and mixed by Mel Simpson
- Remastered by Peter Van T'Riet
