= Steve Lawson (musician) =

British bass guitarist (born 1972)

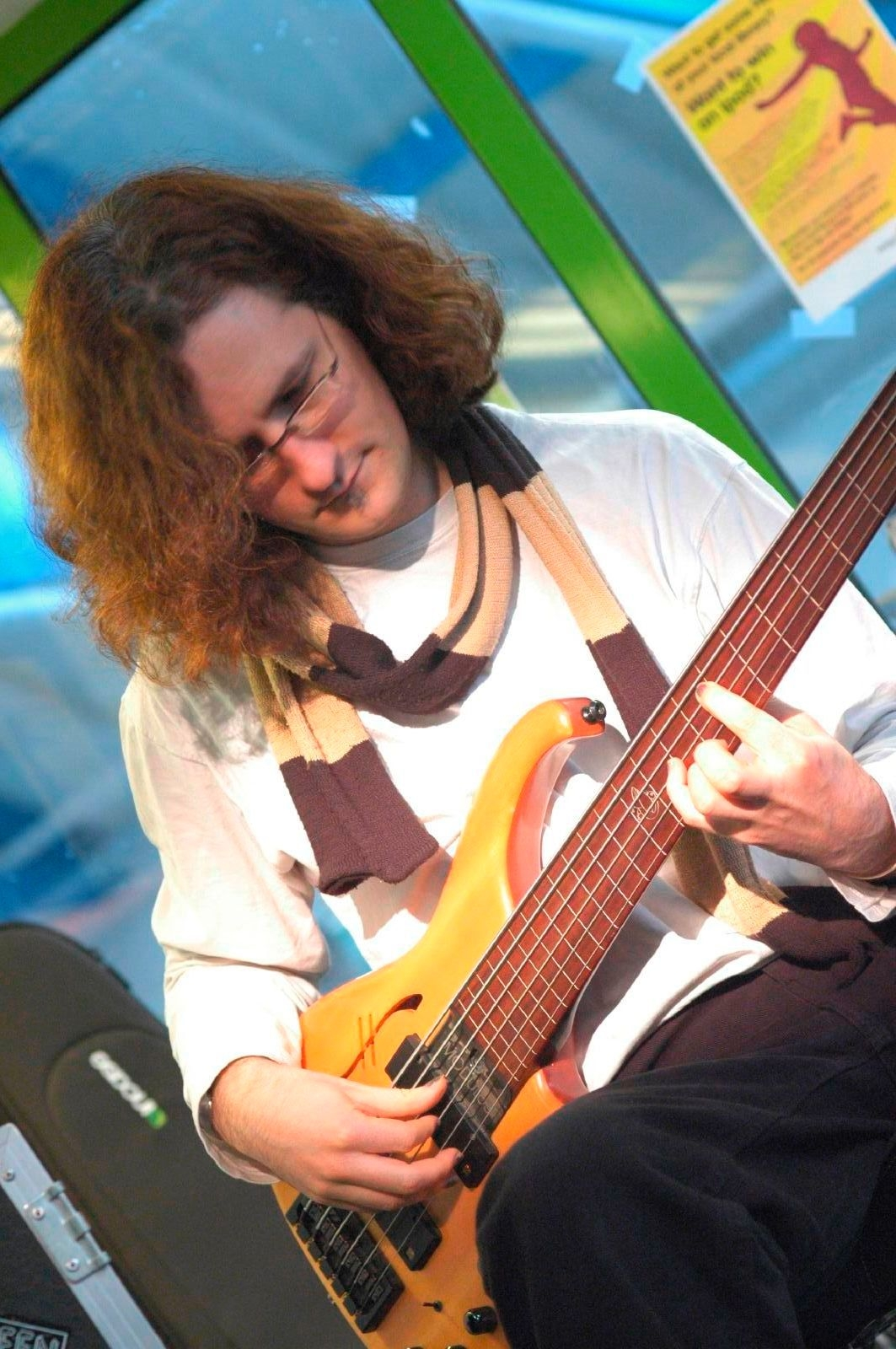
- Steve Lawson performing live

Background information
- Born: 1972 (age 53–54)
- Genres: Jazz fusion, loop music, world music, progressive rock, ambient music, new-age, experimental, doom metal
- Occupations: Musician, journalist, teacher
- Instrument: Bass guitar
- Years active: 1993–present
- Label: Pillow Mountain
- Website: www.stevelawson.net

Steve Lawson (born 1972) is a British bass guitarist. Based in Birmingham, England, Lawson regularly tours in the United States and Europe. He has supported Level 42 and 21st Century Schizoid Band, worked as a third of the political doom metal band #TORYCORE, and performed and recorded as a duo with his wife, singer Lobelia.

Lawson releases his music through his Pillow Mountain label and Bandcamp. His albums have included solo works, duets, and trio with live looping, mingling layers of sounds generated from a bass guitar. As a music journalist he contributes to Bassist, Guitarist magazine, The Independent On Sunday, Third Way magazine, Bass Player, and Bass Guitar magazine.

He teaches bass guitar in Birmingham. In 2015 Bass Guitar magazine published an in depth interview with him.

== Equipment ==
He uses two Modulus 6-string basses, one fretted and one fretless. He uses a Looperlative LP1 for looping and a majority of his effects are provided by the two Lexicon G2 multi-effects processors. Lawson also uses an Elrick Steve Lawson SLC signature bass guitar.

== Discography ==
- And Nothing but the Bass (2000)
- Lessons Learned from an Aged Feline, Pt I (2001)
- Not Dancing for Chicken (2002)
- Grace and Gratitude (2004)
- Lessons Learned From an Aged Feline, Pt II (2004)
- Behind Every Word (2006)
- Lessons Learned From an Aged Feline, Pt III (2006)
- Ten Years On: Live in London (2010)
- 11 Reasons Why 3 is Greater than Everything (2011)
- Believe in Peace (2012)
- What the Mind Thinks, the Heart Transmits (2014)
- Closing In (2015)
- The Way Home (2015)
- You Guys! Let's Just Talk About Nail Varnish! (2015)
- A Crack Where the Light Gets In (2015)
- Referendum (2016)
- The Surrender of Time (2016)
- Hands Music (2016)
- Colony Collapse Disorder (2016)
- Ten Years Too Late (Radio Edit) (2016)
- Well - Say Hello Then (2016)
- Hark-Winter (2016)
- Towards a Better Question (2017)
- PS, You Are Brilliant (2017)
- Small Is Beautiful (2017)
- Always Be The Bridge (2017
- If They Had Won (2017)
- Beauty And Desolation (2018)
- Grace & Gratitude - Revisited (2018)
- The Dudley Bug (2018)
- The Long Game (2018)
- How/Why (2019)
- Stepping Stones (2019)
- The Arctic Is Burning (2019)
- The Field Of Strategic Possibilities (2019)
- The Gift Of Patience (2019)
- Time Is A Broken Lens (2019)
- Tangled (2020)
- The Aesthetics Of Care (2020)
- Better Living Through Technology (2020)
- Half Life (2020)
- (dis)order (2020)
- Hindsight (2020)
- Scenes From The Dystopia (2020)
- an unbearably slow collapse, after bill viola (2020)
- The Root Of It All (2020)
- Here. Now. (2020)
- And Nothing But The Bass @ 20 - The First Concert. (2020)
- Still My Soul (2020)
- Listen (2020)
- A 20/20 Christmas (2020)
- With Trepidation (2020)
- Resolution (2021)
- The Multiverse (2021)
- Cabinet Of Curiosities (2021)
- Birmingham London Oxford Birmingham (2021)
- Forward Motion (2021)
- Skitter (2021)
- No Through Route (2021)
- Fairytale (Christmas 2021) (2021)
- Covid Brain Fog (2022)
- First Glimpse of the Olive Branch (2022)
- Rick (2022)
- TLC (2022)
- The Waiting Game (2022)
- Episode 50: A New Hope (2023)
- The End Is Still Unwritten (2023)
- Blue (2023)
- Three Thin Cows (2023)
- Time Stops Vol 1 (2023)
- Time Stops Vol 2 (2023)
- Time Stops Vol 3 (2023)
- Birdsong (2023)
- Days Like These, Live @ Artefact (2023)
- Falling In Love With The Alien In The Mirror (2023)
- Peace On Earth (2023)
- In Need Of Friends (2024)
- ceasefire (2024)
- LARVIK (2024)
- I'm Still Here (2024)
- Music for Nili-People Pt II (2024)
- Sleighride - Christmas 2024 (2024)
- Unearthed : 2014 (2024)
- Stevemas Eve (2024)
- Great Expectations (2025)
- Show And Tell (2025)
- Ambiguous Hands (2025)
- Amsterdam (2025)
- HamsterJam (2025)
- Once Upon A Time (2025)
- Christmas In Tegucigalpa (2025)
- All Back To Mine (2026)

=== Collaborations ===
- Conversations (2003) with Jez Carr
- It's Not Going to Happen (2003) with Theo Travis
- Behind Every Word (2006) with B J Cole & Julie McKee
- Calamateur v Steve Lawson (2007) with Calamateur
- Live in Nebraska (2008) with Lobelia
- Numbers (2008) as Lawson/Dodds/Wood (with Roy Dodds & Patrick Wood)
- Live At Don Quixotes (2009) with Michael Manring & Lobelia
- Slow Food (2010) with Trip Wamsley
- Infralab (2010) with Trip Wamsley
- Live So Far (2010) with Lobelia
- Hidden Windows (2012) with Neil Alexander
- Invenzioni (2012) with Mike Outram
- Nothing Can Prepare (2012) with Andy Williamson
- ...Honestly, We Had No Idea! (2013) with Daniel Berkman
- Academia (2013) with Daniel Berkman
- Accidentally (On Purpose) (2013) with Daniel Berkman
- Everything Is Possible In This Best Of All Possible Worlds (2013) with Daniel Berkman
- Free Fall (2013) with Daniel Berkman
- Nie Mój Cyrk, Nie Moje Małpy (2013) with Daniel Berkman
- The Sound Of Being Understood (2013) with Daniel Berkman
- Fingerpainting (2013) with Daniel Berkman & Artemis
- Serendipity (2013) with Daniel Berkman & Artemis
- The New Normal (2013) with Daniel Berkman & Artemis
- Diversion (2014) with Jon Thorne
- Marinate (2014) with Julie Slick
- Tangents (2014) with Murphy McCaleb
- Explore (2015) with Ruth Goller
- Live at the Tower of Song with Andy Edwards & Jen Godfrey
- Winter Song (2015) with Andy Edwards & Bryan Corbet
- Ley Lines (2015) with Phi Yaan-Zek & Andy Edwards
- Language Is a Music (2016) with Michael Manring
- The Quiet After the Drums (2016) with Phi Yaan-Zek
- Illuminated Loops I (2017) with Poppy Porter
- Ley Lines II (2017) with Phi Yaan-Zek & Andy Edwards
- Over Time (2017) with Andy Edwards
- Intersect (2017) with Pete Fraser
- Oven-Spring (2017) with Pete Fraser
- Beautifully Disturbed (2017) with Bryan Corbett
- Surprise (2018) with Corey Mwamba
- Live At Around Midnight (2018) with Michael Manring
- Restless (2018) with Peter Fraser
- Ley Lines III (2018) with Phi Yaan-Zek & Andy Edwards
- Illuminated Loops II (2018) with Poppy Porter
- Texture Like Sun (2018) with Rich Brown
- Pulse (2018) with Robert Logan
- The Circle (2018) with Robert Logan
- Illuminated Loops III (2019) with Poppy Porter
- Seeing Sound (2019) with Artemis & Daniel Berkman
- Ley Lines IV (2019) with Phi Yaan-Zek & Andy Edwards
- Ley Lines V (2019) with Phi Yaan-Zek & Andy Edwards
- What We Need (2019) with The Lab; Karlo Wenzel; Sven Kosakowski; Marc Mennigmann
- LEYlines VI - Malleable Mechanism (2020) with Phi Yaan-Zek & Andy Edwards
- Deep Roots Fuzzy Shoots (2021) with Phi Yaan-Zek
- Steve And Lo's Melancholy Christmas (2022) with Lobelia
- Reunion (2023) with Daniel Berkman & Artemis
- Home From Home (2024) with Daniel Berkman
- On The Town (2025) with John Pope

=== Compilations ===
- Best of Steve Lawson Pt 1 (Solo, 2000-2013)
- Best Of Steve Lawson Pt 2 (Collaborations, 2000-2013)
- Best of Steve Lawson Pt 3 (Solos, 2014-2021)
- Best of Steve Lawson Pt 4 (Collaborations, 2014-2021)
- Best of Steve Lawson Pt 5 (The Longs - Solo)
- Best of Steve Lawson Pt 6 (The Longs - Collaborations)
- The Fingerpainting Sessions Vol.1
- The Fingerpainting Sessions Vol.2
