= Pallas (band) =

Scottish progressive rock band

- Also known as: Rainbow, Pallas Athene
- Origin: Aberdeen, Scotland
- Genres: Neo-prog; progressive metal
- Years active: 1976–present
- Labels: Sue-I-Cide (private); Granite Wax (private); Harvest Records; Centaur Discs; Inside Out Music; Pallas Records; Psonik; Music Theories/ Mascot Records
- Members: Ronnie Brown; Niall Mathewson; Graeme Murray; Colin Fraser; Alan Reed
- Past members: Derek Forman; Euan Lowson; Paul Mackie
- Website: pallasofficial.com

Pallas are a Scottish progressive rock band from Aberdeen. They were one of the bands at the vanguard of what was termed neo-prog during progressive rock's second-wave revival in the early 1980s. Other major UK acts included Marillion, IQ, Twelfth Night, Pendragon and Solstice.

== History ==
Formed in 1974 as 'Rainbow', they dropped the name after Ritchie Blackmore left Deep Purple and called his new band Rainbow. Pallas began hitting the club circuit at the beginning of a grassroots revival of full-blown progressive rock, which, at the time, was extremely unfashionable due to the overwhelming influence of pop and new wave. Ignoring prevailing trends, the band even directly imitated older progressive rock bands, with vocalist Brian Wood mimicking the voice and hairstyle of Peter Gabriel, keyboardist Mike Stobbie donning a Rick Wakeman-style cape, and drummer Derek Forman constructing a helmet for himself out of sheet metal. The band temporarily changed their name to Pallas Athene during this time. However, their debut EP (featuring tracks such as "Reds Under the Beds") saw them attempting to fit in with the ongoing punk rock movement by emphasising harder rock and deliberately avoiding signature progressive rock elements such as Mellotron and twelve-string guitar.

An upheaval in the band's ranks during 1979 saw most of the original members leave, with only Forman and bassist Graeme Murray remaining alongside the new recruits. Murray contacted Marillion vocalist Fish through an advertisement in Melody Maker, establishing a relationship between the two progressive rock bands that led to a nationwide tour of small venues which enabled Pallas to establish a following in England, where they were previously unknown (and similarly enabled Marillion to break in to the Scotland market). They secured a successful headlining run at London's Marquee Club (a hotbed for the neo-prog revival). A highlight of their set at that time and also a highlight of the early Marquee shows (until the Marquee threatened to ban the band if they did not stop playing it) was a track called "The Ripper", a fifteen-minute epic about child abuse, insanity, rape and murder. The climax of "The Ripper" featured new lead singer Euan Lowson dressed half as an old man, half as a woman, acting out a rape on stage (the Yorkshire Ripper case was still, at the time, a fresh news item).

The Marillion association and Pallas's relentless gigging (which included a spot on the bill at the 1983 Reading Music Festival) made Pallas a hot property. After releasing a self-produced LP entitled Arrive Alive (recorded in Scotland in 1981), Pallas was courted by EMI Records (who had just signed Marillion) and went into the recording studio with Yes/Emerson, Lake & Palmer engineer Eddy Offord to record The Sentinel. The plan was that The Sentinel would be a recorded version of The Atlantis Suite, an epic centrepiece of the band's live performances at the time based around a futuristic version of the story of Atlantis, with plenty of references to the Cold War.

In order to increase the commercial potential of the group's major label debut the running order was changed, adding more commercial songs and removing much of the Atlantis Suite material. The excised Atlantis Suite tracks were issued as B-sides on singles at the time of the album's release, and in 2004 a remastered version of the album was released with the Atlantis Suite intact as the band intended it.

Some elaborately staged shows in the UK (using The Sentinel concept as the theme, and featuring props by the special effects team from Doctor Who) failed to generate the needed interest, and by the time the band was ready to record their second album for EMI, Lowson decided to leave the band. In the wake of Lowson's departure the band recorded the Knightmoves EP with new singer Alan Reed, former vocalist and frontman with Abel Ganz (cf. Abel Gance). The centre-piece of the EP was the epic "Sanctuary", and early editions of the EP also included a bonus 7" featuring two tracks recorded as demos.

The band went on to record a second EMI album, The Wedge. The Wedge was selling well in Europe, but upon returning from a tour Pallas learned that all of their friends and associates at EMI had either left the company or been fired, and that EMI was withdrawing all promotion for the album.

The band fell into a semi-dormant state for a number of years, but CD reissues of the back catalogue, with extra tracks and re-engineered versions of The Sentinel, kept interest alive. Pallas persevered on and off for several years, and in 1999 released a comeback album, Beat the Drum. This featured a harder sound, returning to the band's classic rock roots, but still retained a progressive sound with glimpses of the epic on tracks such as album closer, "Fragments of The Sun". Interest in the band revived, and the internet became an important component in their career. By now the band was a spare time activity for its members, but they managed regular studio output and occasional short tours of Europe and North America. The Cross & the Crucible, a loose concept album exploring the historical tension between religion and science was released in 2001. The Dreams of Men was released in 2005, supplemented by Paul Anderson on violin and classical singer Pandy Arthur.

In spite of being largely ignored by major record labels and the mainstream music press, with the support of the German independent record label InsideOut the band continued to record and play regular live dates, particularly in Northern Europe. There were also a number of supplementary releases, such as two from the Radio Clyde River Sessions series, a double live collection, several official bootleg recordings and Mythopoeia, an archive CD-ROM of audio and video material from the band's history.

With effect from 28 January 2010, lead singer Alan Reed left the band he had fronted for the past 26 years. He has been replaced by Paul Mackie.

On 27 July 2010, the band announced they had signed a record deal for three albums with Music Theories/Mascot Records. The new album, XXV, was released 27 January 2011. The band confirmed that the album will be the successor to their 1984 release The Sentinel, thematically.

On 24 July 2011, Pallas opened the Prog Stage at the High Voltage Festival in London. Their half-an-hour set largely contained material from 'XXV', plus the song 'Eyes in the Night (Arrive Alive)'. Concert Live recorded the performance.

On 30 November 2013, Pallas played a full gig in Glasgow. The set contained not only known songs from the past albums, but also featured two new ones from the album Wearewhoweare, scheduled for release in 2014. At the end of the set, former frontman Euan Lowson appeared on stage for two songs.

In June 2018, Graeme Murray, posting from the band's Facebook account, stated: "I think there has been a long enough silence on the PALLAS front. The band I suppose is not DEAD, as we are all still alive, just not necessarily on the same continent, or wavelength. BUT not totally dead. Lets just say "in a state of suspended animation". the patient may come back to life!!!"

In December 2023, Pallas released new album The Messenger with returning singer Alan Reed replacing Paul Mackie. This was followed in October 2026 by A Song for Tomorrow.

== Members ==
Current members

- Graeme Murray — bass, backing vocals, guitars, bass pedals (1976–present)
- Niall Mathewson — guitars, guitar synthesizer, synthesizer, occasional backing vocals (1979–present)
- Ronnie Brown — keyboards, backing vocals (1979–1986, 1996–present)
- Alan Reed — lead vocals (1986–1988, 1993-2010, 2022–present)

Former members

- Brian Wood — lead vocals (1976–1979)
- Dave Holt — guitar (1976–1979)
- Mike Stobbie — keyboards (1976–1979, 1987–1996)
- Derek Forman — drums, occasional backing vocals (1976–1998)
- Euan Lowson — lead vocals (1979–1986)
- Colin Fraser — drums (1998–2022)
- Paul Mackie — lead vocals (2010–2022)

== Discography ==
=== Studio albums ===
- The Sentinel (1984) UK No. 41
- The Wedge (1986) UK No. 70
- Beat the Drum (1999)
- The Cross & the Crucible (2001)
- The Dreams of Men (2005)
- XXV (2011)
- Wearewhoweare (2014)
- The Messenger (2023)
- A Song for Tomorrow (2026)

=== Compilation albums ===
- Sketches (c. 1990) – cassette release only
- Knightmoves to Wedge (1992) – re-release of The Wedge with tracks from Knightmoves 12" single interspersed; this was later withdrawn in favour of a remastered edition of The Wedge with the Knightmoves tracks added at the end
- Mythopoeia (2002)
- The Sentinel Demos (2009) – download-only release from the band's homepage
- The Edge Of Time (2019) - collection of 2019 re-recordings of songs from Pallas' back catalogue. Initially available from the band's Bandcamp page.

=== Live albums ===
- Arrive Alive (1981) – initially a cassette-only release, then re-released on vinyl in 1983 with a different cover and slightly different track list; again re-released in 1998 on CD with tracks of the Paris Is Burning single added
- Pallas at the BBC and More (1983-84)
- Live from London, Camden Palace (1985.05) Blu-Ray only
- Live at Ritzy's Aberdeen (1985.10) Previously unreleased
- Live in Southampton (1986) – cassette only fanclub release
- Live our Lives – 2000 (2000)
- The Blinding Darkness (15 September 2003)
- The River Sessions 1 (2005)
- The River Sessions 2 (2005)
- Official Bootleg 27/01/06 (2006)
- Moment to Moment (2008)
- Live At Lorelei (14 February 2012) – MP3-CD and DVD
- The Blinding Darkness & Moment To Moment (Concert Videos) — (2002/2008) Single Blu-ray

=== Radio session ===
Pallas did a live-in-studio recording for the Friday Rock Show on 9 March 1984. The tracks they recorded were Cut and Run, Shock Treatment and a Rise and Fall/Heart Attack medley. The tracks were broadcast on 30 March 1984. The tracks are commercially available on a download version of The Sentinel distributed through Amazon in certain territories i.e. the UK.

=== Archives series ===
To coincide with the revamp of their homepage in August 2013, Pallas re-released a number of out-of-print and archive releases under the Archives Series moniker. These releases include the following:

- Studio recordings: The Pallas EP ‡
- Compilations: Sketches ‡, Knightmoves – an album that never was – both releases have been partly available before on the Mythopoeia compilation.
- Archive Demos: The Arrive Alive Demos (partly available before on the Mythopoeia compilation), The Sentinel Demos, The Sentinel Rough Mix
- Live albums: Live in Southampton ‡, Live our Lives

‡ – indicates an official digital re-release for the first time

=== Singles (UK releases) ===
- § indicates a non-album studio track at the time of the initial release. At present (2011), only the two Alan Reed demo tracks and the extended remix of Throwing Stones at the Wind remain exclusive to the initial vinyl release.
- "Arrive Alive" (1982) – 7"
  - "Arrive Alive", "Stranger on the Edge of Time" §
  - the single was released with two different images on front of the sleeve
- "Paris is Burning" (1983) – 7" – 12"
  - "Paris is Burning" §, "The Hammer Falls" §, "Stranger on the Edge of Time" § (on 12" only)
- "Eyes In The Night" (1984) – 7" – 7" picture disc – 12"
  - "Eyes in the Night", "East West" §, "Crown of Thorns" § (on 12" only)
- "Shock Treatment" (1984) – 7" – 7" poster sleeve – 12"
  - "Shock Treatment", "March On Atlantis" §, "Heart Attack" § (on 12" only)
- "Knightmoves" (1985) – 7" – 12" – 12" picture disc – 12" with bonus 7"
  - "Strangers" §, "Nightmare" §, "Sanctuary" § (on 12" only)
  - initial copies contain bonus 7" single with the 'Alan Reed Demo' tracks "Mad Machine" § and "A Stitch in Time" §, which are band compositions used as auditioning tracks when Alan Reed came up for the vocalist job.
- "Throwing Stones at the Wind" (1986) – 7" – 12"
  - "Throwing Stones at the Wind" (extended mix) §, "Cut and Run" (live version), "Crown of Thorns" (live version; on 12" only)
- "Monster" (radio edit) (2010) – download only single from the band's homepage; full version on the album XXV.
- "Atlantean" (2011) – download only single from the band's homepage; non-album track. This instrumental track is used as the intro on the 2011 tour, meant as a prelude to the opening track of XXV, "Falling Down".
- "Black Moon" (December 2011) – download only single from the band's homepage as a Christmas gift to the fans. This track was recorded in March 2010 shortly after Paul Mackie joined the band. The song was originally recorded by Emerson, Lake & Palmer for their 1994 album Black Moon. Pallas was asked to contribute to a planned ELP tribute compilation in spring of 2010, but the project folded prior to realisation, due to business issues. So the band shelved the track without initial intention of release.
- "Monster (Big Band Version)" (6 January 2012) – download only single from the band's homepage. This was the result of a little experimental excursion on several tracks from the XXV album that took place in the fall of 2011.
- "XXV Mega-mix" (15 February 2012) – bonus track on the Live At Lorelei CD and also available as a free download from the band's homepage. Orchestral re-arrangement of the album track laid out as a medley of "Alien Messiah", "XXV Part I" and "XXV Part II" with 11+ mins. of playing time. Several British prog / rock magazines featured the track on their magazine's freebie CD.
- "Something In The Deep (Karaoke Mix)" (10 May 2013) – download only release from the band's section on Bandcamp.com.

=== Other singles ===
Some of the regular singles have seen releases in other territories such as Germany or the United States. This section is for releases unique to territories outside UK.

- "Eyes In The Night" / "Shock Treatment" Spanish promo single (1984) – 7"
  - black and white picture sleeve, Spanish titles on the label and the cover (EMI P-040)

=== EPs ===
- PALLAS EP a.k.a. Sue-I-Cide EP (1978) – debut recording privately released in February 1978 on the mini label Sue-I-Cide from Aberdeen. Manufactured in a quantity of 1,000 items of which around 700 were sold at gigs. The tracks comprised Reds under the Beds, Wilmot (Dove House), Thought Police and C.U.UK which are all exclusive to this release. Comes in a plain white paper sleeve with a name/logo stamp in one corner.

Unlike the later releases this debut effort features a totally different musical style. Whereas Pallas has been compared with their contemporary competitors Marillion regularly, this EP is more in the verve of early material by The Police.

- Complimentary Tape 25/04/98 (1998) – given out to fans who wanted to attend Pallas' gig on 25 April 1998 at the Day of Dreams festival at the Hedon club in Zwolle that was cancelled on short notice, as a compensation for the inconvenience caused. The blank tape contains demo versions of "Beat The Drum" and "Blood And Roses" from the then-to-be-released album, Beat The Drum, plus an alternate take of "Refugee" from the never released Voices In The Dark album. Due to the circumstances of its existence this tape is – apart from the 1978 Sui-I-Cide EP – the most scarce item in Pallas' discography. The tape was re-issued in 2003 with a different J-card design and called PALLAS Sampler Tape. The three tracks saw a broader release through the Mythopoeia compilation in 2000.

=== Compilation appearances ===
- SI Magazine: Compilation Disc (1991) – CD
  - Pallas contributed "War Of Words" from the unreleased Voices In The Dark album to this compilation of the Dutch progressive rock magazine SI.
- SI Magazine: Compilation Disc (1993) – CD
  - Pallas contributed "Never Too Late" from the unreleased Voices In The Dark album to this compilation of the Dutch progressive rock magazine SI.

Both aforementioned tracks saw a re-release on the Mythopoeia compilation in 2000.

- Mannerisms – A Celebration of the Music of Geoff Mann (1994) – CD
  - Pallas contributed "What In The World" to this tribute compilation to the work of the late neo-prog artist Geoff Mann, who died the previous year. Other notable bands on the album include IQ, Galahad, Pendragon, Jadis, Eden Burning, and Mann's own band Twelfth Night.
  - In addition, Alan Reed, the Pallas vocalist, collaborated with Clive Nolan (Pendragon, Arena) on another track on the compilation, "Love Song".
