= Andrew Howie =

Scottish singer-songwriter

- Born: Andrew Howie; Scotland
- Origin: Glasgow, Scotland
- Genres: Singer-songwriter, alternative, electronic music, experimental rock
- Occupations: Musician, record producer
- Years active: 2000–present
- Label: Autoclave Records
- Website: www.andrew-howie.com

Andrew Howie (born 1974) is a Scottish singer-songwriter, producer and music tutor. From 2000 to 2013 he released music under the moniker of Calamateur. Howie's first album released under his own name, The Great Divide, was released in March 2015 on Autoclave Records. He has since released the Victory EP, two ambient albums, and Lonely Hummingbird, an album of songs co-written with American songwriters.

Howie also works regularly with prisons, schools, youth clubs and community groups, delivering music and songwriting workshops.

== As Calamateur ==
=== First years (2000–02) ===
Calamateur's first record was the 7" single White Light Unknown / Inhabit which was released in 2000. The single received airplay from John Peel and BBC Radio 1's Scottish Evening Session. It received high praise from a number of music publications. In 2001 Howie's then band, Oldsolar, released their first album Many Visitors Have Been Gored By Buffalo to high acclaim in both national press and music magazines such as NME

Howie followed this up with Autocity EP in 2002, a four track EP that sampled reports of car-accidents. A jarringly different musical direction from the previous release, a pattern that Calamateur would follow with subsequent releases. It received airplay from John Peel and Radio 3's Late Junction, garnering praise in In This Music? and Rough Trade.

=== First albums (2003–05) ===
Early 2003 saw the formation of the Autoclave Records label, which was to become home to all of Calamateur's future releases to date. The first Autoclave Records release was an Oldsolar EP on which Howie played.

In 2003, Calamateur released the eight track EP Son of Everyone and ten track mini album Tiny Pushes Vol.1: How to be Childlike. Both received high praise from the press.

Tiny Pushes Vol.1 was an exercise in limitations, recorded on four-track for very little budget. It is the most lo-fi of Calamateur's offerings and is notable as the first of Calamateur's releases to be made available for free when released.

In the late Summer of 2002 Calamateur played his first live gig, after seven years of writing songs, followed by a spate of support slots leading to playing at Greenbelt Festival.

The Son of Everyone EP was born of a desire to have a physical release that more closely resembled the music that Howie was playing at live venues instead of the more experimental releases put out at that point. A more conventional singer-songwriter album, it was the first to deal with the themes of faith, doubt and hope; themes that are still laced through Calamateur releases.

In 2004 Howie made the split from Oldsolar, largely due to logistical reasons, just after completion of a second album that, despite interest from labels, was never picked up.

July 2004 saw Calamateur build on the success of the Son of Everyone EP with The Old Fox of '45. A more eclectic affair, this album lost some of the acoustic stylings that had been present on earlier releases, in favour of richer electronic sounds, and features a full-band opening track, Half Truth, and a Blue Nile cover, Automobile Noise.

2004 also saw the release of Deep Peace a compilation album curated by Calamateur that features Aereogramme, Oldsolar and a slew of other artists. Deep Peace was released to raise public awareness for Trident Ploughshares.

=== Small projects and side projects (2005–07) ===
Over 2005 and 2006 Calamateur had two releases. In 2005 Tiny Pushes Vol.2: All the Wrong Buttons was released as a free album and received good reviews from Diskant and Is This Music?, also receiving airplay on BBC Radio 3's Late Junction. In 2006 Sergeant Howie's Holy Stamina Test was released on a track by track basis; all of the songs appearing on the EP were recorded over a ten-hour period. Calamateur collaborated with Steve Lawson in 2007 to produce a nine-track album, Calamateur vs. Steve Lawson.

=== TV appearance, Jesus is for Losers, and The Trufflehunters (2008–09) ===
In the summer of 2008 Calamateur filmed four songs and an interview for Rapal, a popular BBC Alba music television programme.

Jesus is for Losers was released in 2008 and received positive reviews from the press. It was released on a track-by-track basis with each track being accompanied by a blog post explaining a little about the song.

In early 2009 another side-project was launched to the wider-world—The Trufflehunters—a three-piece group released the album Signs of Life. Again, unlike the main body of Calamateur work, the album had a folkish, psalmodic quality.

In late 2009, a follow-up album with five tracks was made available to people who bought Jesus is for Losers, or helped to promote the album. Howie finished the year with a release of a compilation of tracks commissioned over 2008 and 2009, Commissions 2008–2009.

=== Each Dirty Letter and The Quiet in the Land (2010–2011) ===
May 2010 saw the release of Each Dirty Letter to high praise. Each Dirty Letter is the first Calamateur album that was not self-produced. A deeply personal album which conversely worked to give it greater appeal and the widest audience for a Calamateur album to date. The album received positive reviews in the national press and a number of music magazines. In 2012,Each Dirty Letter opener Change This World was featured on the BBC3 drama Lip Service.

The album release was followed up by a single release of Banoffee in August. This was also the year which saw the completion of Inverness Old Town art's Street Texts project, which Calamateur was involved with in several ways; working with a local primary school to produce The Bad Weather Song, soundtracking a short film by DUFI about the project, and having lyrics from his song Inhabit engraved on a paving stone in Church Street in Inverness. At the end of this year the entire Calamateur back catalogue was made available on Bandcamp.

The Quiet in the Land was released in November 2011; it did not receive the same level of press coverage as Each Dirty Letter but has found high praise with old and new fans alike.

In 2011 Calamateur started to playing house concerts. Recently Howie has produced a research study into the house concert movement. This year also the release of some tracks that Howie remixed for Iain Morrison.

== Discography ==
- 2000: White Light Unknown / Inhabit
- 2002: Autocity EP
- 2003: 258 Bridges EP
- 2003: Tiny Pushes Vol.1: How to be Childlike
- 2003: Son of Everyone EP
- 2004: The Old Fox of '45
- 2005: Tiny Pushes Vol.2 All the Wrong Buttons
- 2006: Sergeant Howie's Holy Stamina Test
- 2007: Calamateur vs. Steve Lawson
- 2008: Jesus is for Losers
- 2009: Jesus if for Losers, Bonus Tracks
- 2009: Commissions 2008–2009
- 2010: Banoffee EP
- 2010: Each Dirty Letter
- 2011: The Quiet in the Land
- 2012: Something Better EP
- 2013: Phonic Estate No.1
- 2015: The Fury and the Sound
- 2015: The Great Divide
- 2015: Victory
- 2016: Scars Are Like A Beacon
- 2017: I Can Sing A Rainbow
- 2017: Lonely Hummingbird
- 2018: Solo Guitar Loops 1
- 2018: Micronations
- 2019: Fragile EP
- 2019: Solo Guitar Loops 2
- 2020: Ambient 3: Miss Ballantyne
- 2020: Silver Dollar Club
- 2020: Remixed
- 2021: Sycamore
- 2021: Pale White Braches
- 2022: is this music? Session @ Regal Radio
- 2022: Live From The Lounge Session @ Express FM
- 2024: Micronations (instrumental)
- 2026: Diagram
- 2026: I Want To Tell You Everything’s Perfect
