= Andy Edwards =

Andy or Andrew Edwards may refer to:

- Andy Edwards (footballer, born 1971), English footballer and manager
- Andy Edwards (footballer, born 1965), Welsh footballer
- Andy Edwards (musician), English drummer
- Andy Edwards (sculptor), English artist
- Andrew Edwards (cricketer) (born 1978), English cricketer
- Andrew David Edwards (born 1958), American serial killer
