= Andy Revell =

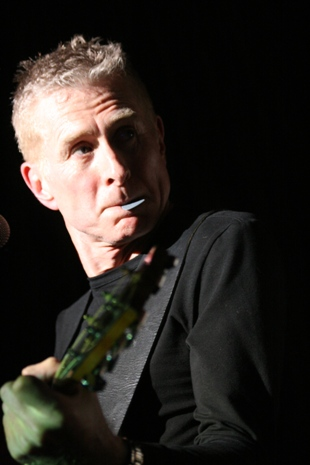
- Andy Revell
- Born: 21 February 1958 (age 67); Bournemouth, England

Andy "Rev" Revell (born Andrew David Revell on 21 February 1958) is a British businessman, scientist and musician. He was founding member of the band Twelfth Night in 1978.

He first started playing guitar after seeing Led Zeppelin in December 1971. After learning to play on a black Shaftsbury Les Paul copy, and being part of amateur bands in his home town of Bournemouth, he bought his trademark 1963 Gibson Les Paul Goldtop in 1977.

Andy formed Twelfth Night with Brian Devoil and Clive Mitten in 1978, and stayed until the end in 1987.

After doing some session work he stopped playing the guitar in 1988 and started writing-up his PhD. Having completed his PhD, he left Reading University in 1989 to work in the AIDS field for the Wellcome Foundation. He stayed at Wellcome until 1995. Between 1996 and 1999, he was Board Director of the medical communications group MediTech Media, and between 2000 and 2002, he was Communications Director of Virco Diagnostics.

Revell founded RDI in 2002 – a non-profit organisation developing artificial intelligence to optimise treatment decision-making in HIV/AIDS; and in 2004, he founded Household Design. He gained an MSc in Occupational Psychology from Birkbeck College, University of London in 2006.

Revell re-joined Twelfth Night for a series of concerts in 2007 and 2008, but left the band at the beginning of 2010. He performed as part of The Cryptic Clues, a spin-off band containing the three founder members of Twelfth Night in 2012, and at a one-off reunion of Twelfth Night in 2014.
