= The Sentinel (album) =

Studio album by Pallas
- Released: 13 February 1984
- Genre: Neo-prog
- Length: 39:00
- Label: Harvest
- Producer: Eddy Offord

Pallas chronology
Arrive Alive (1981)	The Sentinel (1984)	The Wedge (1986)

Singles from The Sentinel
- 1. "Eyes in the Night (Arrive Alive)" Released: 16 January 1984; 2. "Shock Treatment" Released: March 1984

The Sentinel is the debut album by British neo-progressive rock band Pallas. Released in February 1984, it is a concept album with lyrics based upon Cold War themes, using a futuristic version of the tale of Atlantis as a metaphor for a technologically advanced society brought to the brink of destruction. The cover artwork is by Patrick Woodroffe.

== Background and recording ==
Pallas had been actively touring for years before their debut album was recorded. A newly established association with Marillion, the popularity of heavy metal in the adolescent market, and a revival of interest in progressive rock led to the band being signed to EMI for a £500,000 advance. As a further indication that EMI were considering the possibility of a progressive rock revival, Eddy Offord, known for his extensive work with Yes and Emerson, Lake & Palmer, was brought on as producer.

Much of the album's material first appeared in the Atlantis Suite, an epic science fiction rock opera which was a cornerstone of live Pallas shows at the time. The band's original intent was that the album would present the entire piece as a concept album. The group recorded the entire suite at the time; however, EMI wanted the group to balance its progressive efforts with more commercial songs, namely "Eyes in the Night" (AKA "Arrive Alive"), "Cut and Run", and "Shock Treatment". As a result, only four of the seven songs from the Atlantis Suite were presented in the original version of the album, and not in Pallas's preferred running order. The excised songs were issued as B-sides and EP tracks.

The album was re-released on CD in 1992, under the Centaur Records label, with bonus tracks and a different running order; the commercial tunes the band recorded at EMI's behest are put at the start of the running order as a "warm-up", whilst the remainder of the album consists of the Atlantis Suite in its entirety. The record was released again in 2004 under the Insideout label on a numbered, special edition CD with added content.

== Reception ==
Professional ratings
Review scores
Source	Rating
Allmusic	2.5/5 stars
Kerrang!	(mixed)
Progreviews	(favorable)
Sounds	3/5 stars

In a retrospective review for Allmusic, Robert Taylor said Pallas's approach is derivative, and that the album's longer songs tend to be repetitious while the shorter songs are uninteresting standard rock tunes.

== Track listing ==
All tracks written by Ronnie Brown, Derek Forman, Euan Lowson, Niall Mathewson, and Graeme Murray

=== Side 1 ===
1. "Eyes in the Night (Arrive Alive)" - 4:08
2. "Cut and Run" - 5:02
3. "Rise and Fall" - 10:16

=== Side 2 ===
1. "Shock Treatment" - 4:29
2. "Ark of Infinity" - 7:05
3. "Atlantis" - 8:00

=== 1992 CD re-issue ===
1. "Shock Treatment" - 4:29
2. "Cut and Run" - 4:59
3. "Arrive Alive" - 4:05
4. "Rise and Fall (Part 1)" - 6:05
5. "Eastwest" - 4:58
6. "March on Atlantis" - 5:23
7. "Rise and Fall (Part 2)" - 4:08
8. "Heart Attack" - 7:59
9. "Atlantis" - 7:59
10. "Ark of Infinity" - 7:05

Total length 57:26

== Band members ==
- Euan Lowson – lead Vocal and Backing Voices
- Niall Mathewson – Lead Guitar, Roland Guitar Synthesizer, E Bow, and Backing Vocals
- Ronnie Brown – New England Digital Synclavier II, Oberheim OB-X Polyphonic Synthesizer, Roland Jupter-4 Polyphonic Synthesizer, Novatron, Steinway Grand Piano, Korg Sigma Synthesizer and Backing Vocals
- Graeme Murray – Rickenbacker 4001 Bass Guitar, Second Voice, Custom 12-String Guitar, Moog Taurus Bass Pedals and Backing Vocals
- Derek Forman – Premier Drums, Rototoms, Timbales, Tubular Bells, Simmons Drums and Backing Vocals
