= The Wake (IQ album) =

Studio album by IQ
- Released: 3 June 1985
- Recorded: March–April 1985
- Studio: Falconer Studios, London
- Genre: Neo-prog
- Length: 49:01
- Label: Sahara
- Producer: Mike Holmes; Tim Esau

IQ chronology
Tales from the Lush Attic (1983)	The Wake (1985)	Living Proof (1986)

Singles from The Wake
- 1. "Corners" / "The Thousand Days" Released: 1985

Professional ratings
Review scores
Source	Rating
AllMusic	4.5/5 stars

The Wake is the second studio album by British neo-prog band IQ, released on 3 June 1985 by Sahara Records. Recorded at Falconer Studios in London from March to April 1985, it was produced by Mike Holmes and Tim Esau.

== Release and reception ==
The Wake is IQ's only album to reach the UK Charts, peaking at number 72 with a stay of one week.

The Wake has been described by AllMusic as "definitely a classic" which "helped define what neo-progressive was and generated dozens of sound-alike albums." The review argued that it "remains the band's true classic, a must-have for anyone remotely interested in progressive rock from the 1980s."

== Sleeve art ==
The cover art was designed by lead singer Peter Nicholls. In the image, most of the characters are original, except the central one, which is based on Canadian actress Rae Dawn Chong wearing clay face paint as Ika in the film Quest for Fire (1981). However, according to Nicholls, many fans of the band misinterpreted this as a self-portrait, since he wore extensive stage makeup at the time.

In what is thought to be the earliest photograph ever taken of the band Radiohead, a poster of The Wake is shown on the wall behind Thom Yorke at Abingdon School.

== Track listing ==
All tracks are written by Mike Holmes, Martin Orford, Peter Nicholls, Tim Esau and Paul Cook

Side one
No.	Title	Length
1.	"Outer Limits"	8:14
2.	"The Wake"	4:12
3.	"The Magic Roundabout"	8:19
4.	"Corners"	6:21

Side two
No.	Title	Length
5.	"Widow's Peak"	9:13
6.	"The Thousand Days"	5:12
7.	"Headlong"	7:30
Total length:		49:01

Original Cassette and CD bonus track
No.	Title	Length
8.	"Dans le parc du chateau noir"	7:35
Total length:		56:41

1994 Giant Electric Pea Records bonus tracks
No.	Title	Length
8.	"Dans le parc du chateau noir"	7:40
9.	"The Thousand Days" (demo)	3:58
10.	"The Magic Roundabout" (demo)	6:28
Total length:		67:09

== Personnel ==
=== IQ ===
- Peter Nicholls – vocals and tambourine; design and illustration
- Mike Holmes – guitars; production
- Tim Esau – bass; production
- Martin Orford – synthesizer, organ, Mellotron, flute and backing vocals
- Paul Cook – drums and percussion

=== Technical personnel ===
- Harun Coombes – engineer
- George Bodnar – cover photography

== Charts ==
Chart (1985)	Peak position
UK Albums (OCC)	72
