= Andy Edwards (musician) =

British musician (born 1968)

Andy Edwards (born 1968) is a British drummer, multi-instrumentalist musician and music critic who is best known as former member of the progressive rock bands Frost* and IQ.

== Robert Plant's Priory of Brion ==
Edwards first came to prominence as the drummer in Robert Plant's Priory of Brion. Formed in 1999, the band performed more than 100 concerts across Europe. With the dissolution of this band in late 2000, Edwards became the UK's master drum clinician for Tama drums, performing at many of the major drum festivals and contributing to articles for a variety of drums magazines including Rhythm Magazine, Modern Drummer and Ragazzi. In 2001 readers of Rhythm Magazine voted Edwards as one of the top ten drum clinicians in the UK.

In 2002 Edwards joined The Ian Parker Band and toured extensively across Europe and played on the albums Lost and Found (2003) and Inside (2003).

== IQ, Frost* and progressive rock ==
In 2005 Edwards joined the neo-progressive IQ and toured Europe, US and Canada, and performed on the DVD Stage (2006) and on the album Frequency (2009). He then formed the neo-progressive rock supergroup Neo with members of IQ, Pendragon and Pallas and released the CD/DVD Broadcast (2006).

In 2006 Edwards joined Frost*, a progressive band formed by the keyboardist Jem Godfrey (best known for his pop songwriting and production for Atomic Kitten, Shane Ward and Holly Vallance), along with IQ bassist John Jowitt and guitarist John Mitchell. Their debut album Milliontown (2006) was well received among progressive rock fans, with Edwards being voted in the top five progressive rock drummers in the world in the DPRP Poll two years in a row.

In 2008 Frost released Experiments in Mass Appeal (2008).

Edwards departed IQ and Frost in 2009 and moved into music education and session work. He also contributed to sessions for Clive Nolan and Martin Orford.

In 2010, he briefly rejoined his ex-bandmates in Frost* to contribute to the track “The Dividing Line”, which was released as a bonus track on the live Philadelphia Experiment album later that year. In 2013, he was the guest drummer on The Twenty Seven Club by the progressive rock band Magenta, and this session led to the formation of Kiama, with Magenta keyboardist Rob Reed.

Away from live performance, in 2010 Edwards became the course leader for music at Kidderminster College and recorded a number of experimental improvisatory albums with bassist Steve Lawson and performed on a number of recordings with the virtuoso guitarist Phi Yaan-Zek. Edwards has also been featured and contributed to a number of books about Robert Plant.

In 2016 Edwards joined forces with former ELO and Move drummer Bev Bevan to form the double drummer rhythm section for the Birmingham folk rock band Quill and performed a number of concerts across the UK, including a show at the Cropredy Festival in 2017.

In 2024 Edwards played drums at the Winters End Festival for Tim Bowness and a band consisting of John Jowitt, Matt Stevens (of The Fierce and the Dead) and Rob Groucutt.

== Solo work ==
Andy Edwards is a multi-instrumentalist and producer. In 2001 he joined forces with Timmy Vegas in a group called Wikkamen and started producing garage and house recordings for a variety of labels including Blanco Y Negro and Palm Pictures. This has led to Edwards releasing a number of albums that explore electronica, jazz, funk, prog and experimental styles which in turn has led to the formation of the electronic funk jazz group Kundabuffa.

== Youtube music critic ==
In 2021, Edwards started a YouTube channel discussing rock music, prog, jazz and jazz rock as well as aesthetic philosophy. He has had Narada Michael Walden, Matthew Tavares, Simon Phillips and Jason Marsalis on as guests. He has also teamed up with fellow musician and YouTuber Rick Beato.

== Health ==
Andy Edwards suffers from Irritable Bowel Syndrome.
