= Brian Devoil =

British drummer (born 1954)

Brian Ronald Devoil (born 20 July 1954) is a British drummer who was a founding member of the band Twelfth Night.
