= Andy Sears =

English musician (born 1960)

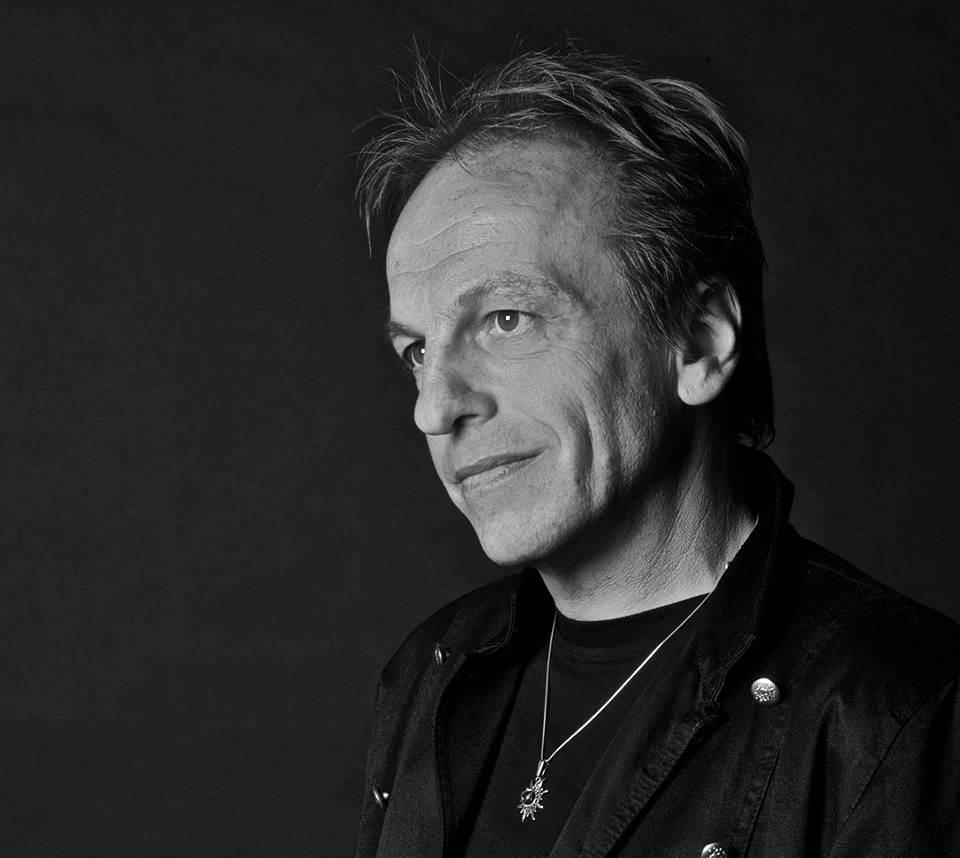
- Andy Sears
- Born: Andreas Costa Sears; 16 January 1960 (age 66); Shoreham-by-Sea, England

Andy Sears (born Andreas Costa Sears, 16 January 1960, Shoreham-By-Sea, West Sussex, England) is an English musician and vocalist/composer of the band Twelfth Night from November 1983 to December 1986, and again from June 2007 to November 2012.

Sears co-wrote many songs for Davy Jones of The Monkees during the early 1980s, many of which have been subsequently released in Japan and the US.

He provided all the backing vocals on the album Calibrated Collision Course by Spanish band Galadriel (2008).

In 2011, he released a limited edition CD of work in progress, Souvenir to coincide with a European Tour as support to Pendragon.

Recently, Sears has garnished critical acclaim for his character portrayal of the villainous 'Lord Henry Jagman' in the musical Alchemy, by Clive Nolan.

He is currently working on his next solo album, The Dragon Inside.

== Discography ==
=== Solo work ===
- 2011: Souvenir

=== Twelfth Night Albums ===
Studio

- Art and Illusion: October 1984, re-released on CD in 2003 with seven bonus tracks; re-released again on CD in 2010 with 12 bonus tracks
- Twelfth Night XII: July 1986, re-released on CD in 2005 with six bonus tracks

Live

- MMX: November 2010

Compilations

- Collector's Item: 1991, reissued with some different tracks 2001
- Voices in the Night: 2007

Archive releases

- 2005 Corner of the World Tour: live recording from 1985
- 2005 Live From London: live recording from 1984
- 2006 Night Vision: live recording from 1984

Singles

- June 1986 "Shame" / "Shame(ful mix)": 7" and 12" single
- August 1986 "Take a Look (part 4)" / "Blondon Fair" (short version) 7" single
- August 1986 "Take a Look (part 4)" / "Blondon Fair" (long version) / "Take a Look" (album version) 12" single

=== With other artists ===
- The Knife - Black Prince Disclosure - All background harmonies (2004)
- Galadriel - Calibrated Collision Course (2008) All background harmonies
- Clive Nolan - Alchemy (2013)
