= Pookah Makes Three =

The Pookah Makes Three were an electronic pop music group from the United Kingdom formed in 1981. The members were Martyn Watson and Mallett (Martyn Hallett); both former members of UK indie band Lost Touch. They released four singles for the 10 Records label (later a subsidiary of Virgin), with "Take It Back" being moderately successful. The group broke up in 1986 after their fourth single "Love Can't Be Far" failed to chart.

Watson later joined Twelfth Night on bass guitar and vocals. He then became a successful talent scout, as well as working with artists including Patti Smith, Divinyls and David Bowie. Martyn Watson died in May, 2019.

In 1989, Hallett joined Transvision Vamp on live drums.

The band's name refers to a fairy in Celtic folklore, the púca.

== Singles ==
Year	Release	UK	AU	Label
March 1984	"Lucky Lucky Lucky" / "Fanfare for a Cowboy"	-	-	10 Records (TEN 15)
September 1984	"Take It Back" / "I Can Do Anything"	85	28	10 Records (TEN 31)
May 1985	"Waving Flame" / "This"	-	-	10 Records (TEN 40)
July 1985	"Love Can't Be Far" / "Who in the World"	-	-	10 Records (TEN 56)
