= Nomzamo Zondo =

South African human rights attorney

Nomzamo Zondo is a South African attorney, specialising in human rights. Since July 2014, Zondo has been the Director of Litigation for the Socio-Economic Rights Institute for South Africa (SERI). In 2020, Zondo became executive director for SERI.

== Notable Cases ==
Under her leadership, SERI has argued and won numerous cases on social and economic rights before the Constitutional Court of South Africa.

In 2017, SERI successfully argued that the rules on emergency shelter for poor people evicted from their homes were unconstitutional (see, Dladla and Others v City of Johannesburg and Another 2018 (2) SA 327 (CC)). The rules prohibited men and women from living together through the provision of single-sex dormitories, resulting in the separation of families. The rules also required residents to be out of the shelter between 8 am and 5:30 pm every day, and to return by 8 pm, or face the prospect of not being allowed to enter the shelter. The Constitutional Court of South Africa held that these rules violated the rights to dignity, freedom and security of the person, and privacy, recognised under sections 10, 12 and 14 of the Constitution of South Africa.

In 2014, SERI successfully challenged the forcible removal of thousands of street traders from their trading sites in the Central Business District in Johannesburg, South Africa (see, South African Informal Traders Forum and Others v City of Johannesburg and Others 2014 (4) SA 371 (CC)). The traders were forcibly evicted as part of "Operation Clean Sweep" undertaken by the City of Johannesburg under Mayor Parks Tau between 30 September and 31 October 2013. While attempting to enforce an order of the Constitutional Court of South Africa upholding the rights of street traders, Zondo was arrested by officers of the Johannesburg Municipal Police Division. This took place on 5 December 2013, the night of Nelson Mandela's death. Zondo was released on bail later that night. On appearing before the Magistrate's Court the subsequent morning, all charges against her were dropped.

Under Zondo, SERI also represents the families of 36 people who were killed during the Marikana massacre. Zondo has repeatedly raised concerns regarding the persistent failure to prosecute those responsible for the massacre.

== Selected publications ==
- The Legacy of Marikana: Accountability urgent to prevent another atrocity, Nomzamo Zondo and Maanda Makwarela, Daily Maverick (15 August 2018).
- 'Bad buildings' - the law is not the problem, Lauren Royston, Lwazi Mtshiya and Nomzamo Zondo, Daily Maverick (6 July 2017).
- What students will learn from exercise of power, Stuart Wilson and Nomzamo Zondo, Business Day (21 October 2016).
- Upgrading informal settlements: The importance of the Slovo Park judgment, Nomzamo Zondo and Lauren Royston, Daily Maverick (11 April 2016).
