= Twelfth Night (band) =

English neo-prog band

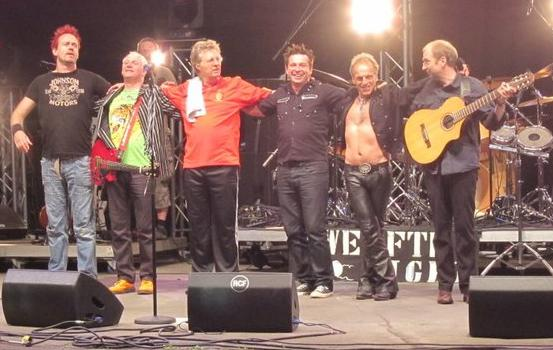
- Twelfth Night in 2010

Background information
- Also known as: The Cryptic Clues (2012)
- Origin: Reading, Berkshire, England
- Genres: Neo-prog
- Years active: 1978–1987, 2007–2008, 2010, 2012, 2014, 2018
- Members: Brian Devoil; Andy Revell; Mark Spencer
- Past members: Rick Battersby; Geoff Mann; Electra McLeod; Andy Sears; Martyn Watson; Roy Keyworth; Andy Faulkner; Clive Mitten; Dean Baker
- Website: twelfthnight.info

Twelfth Night are an English neo-prog band of the 1980s, reformed between 2007 and 2012 and again in 2014. The BBC has described them as Reading's biggest band of the 1980s.

== History ==
=== Formation ===
The seeds of Twelfth Night were sown when guitarist Andy Revell and drummer Brian Devoil joined forces on 23 February 1978 to win a talent competition at Reading University. The road crew included Geoff Mann as backdrop painter, and Rick Battersby as dry ice engineer. Devoil's previous musical experience was of various local bands in Reading, including Trash with whom he recorded a single "Priorities" released by Polydor in October the previous year. Revell's previous bands (in Bournemouth) included Joe Soap and The Bubbles and Abraxas. Later in 1978, Clive Mitten wandered into a rehearsal and asked for a job. Devoil described Mitten as being very good in creating opportunities, convincing them when he said "you need a bass player". Mitten had previously played with local bands in Brighton, including Luna Hare.

=== Twelfth Night ===
Following a couple of gigs as the "Andy Revell Band", the band changed their name to Twelfth Night. In March 1979, the band completed its first recording which resulted in the 'legendary' Skan demo (Line-up: Devoil, Mitten, Revell). Later, during the Summer, they played one notable gig: a Midsummer Rock Concert at Reading University where friend Mann guested on vocals. After a couple of open-air concerts in the summer, the band retired to Mann's parents' home in Manchester for rehearsals taking Battersby with them. While there they played a gig in Salford to an audience of 10 year olds.

When Battersby and Mann joined the band it was their first musical venture, although Battersby had previously been classically trained in the piano. However, Mann decided to remain in Manchester to paint and work with a close friend, Peter Lawrence, in a two-piece "off the wall" band called the "God Stars". So Twelfth Night, having decided to forge ahead as an instrumental band, started gigging in earnest early in 1980. These early gigs were mainly pubs in the Home Counties.

=== Coming to notice ===
The band's first publicly available material was released in January 1980. This was an album featuring live versions of Fur Helene and Encore along with studio tracks Freddie Hepburn and Sequences. It was only available as a cassette and was named The First Tape Album. Their first major breakthrough came when music paper "Musicians Only" voted this tape its "Demo of the Week". This was followed by an ecstatic gig review and full page article – the band's first national press.

To find a vocalist, the band advertised in Melody Maker and during that summer recruited American singer Electra MacLeod.

Electra added lyrics to a number of previously instrumental pieces, notably "The Cunning Man", "Abacus", "Keep The Aspidistra Flying" and "Sequences". Live recordings of this line-up remain unreleased.

The band, with Electra, recorded a second cassette album (known variously as Twelfth Night, The Electra Tapes and Early Material) which was released to coincide with an autumn tour. However, this did not work out and Electra left during November 1980. Despite this, a single, jokingly named "The First 7" Album" (TN001) was released that December featuring Electra's vocal contribution to "The Cunning Man" and a newly recorded short version of "Fur Helene".

Following Electra's departure the band quickly recorded a live album, Live at the Target (TN002). This album was released in February 1981 and was promoted by extensive live dates on a couple of which support was provided by "God Stars". This tour included the band's first gigs at the Marquee Club, London.

=== Success ===
The album Live at the Target was recorded over two days in January. This led to a publishing deal with Neptune – signed in March 1981 – and the initial success of the album prompted Pinnacle Records to offer a distribution deal which meant the band had product available nationally for the first time. It appeared in both Heavy Metal and Hippy charts in both Melody Maker and Sounds.

Once again the summer saw them searching for a vocalist. One track recorded with Reading vocalist Ian Lloyd-Jones in May 1981 was intended as a single, but did not materialise.

Eventually they recruited Mann once again and opened the Reading festival in August 1981, being only the second local band to appear at the event (after A.F.T. in 1976 who released one LP on Charisma that same year). Mann's own version of Sequences, debuted at Reading, would soon become a live staple and, ultimately, perhaps the best-loved Twelfth Night song.

After this they disappeared into the studio to demo some new songs. Some of the tracks from these demos were released on an LP length tape early in December 1981. Entitled Smiling at Grief (TN003) it also included Fur Helene Part II, one of the earliest tracks written in 1978 and not previously released. During this period Battersby left the band to pursue some solo projects. By this time, Live At The Target had also enjoyed significant sales in America, Scandinavia and Europe.

The band spent most of 1982 writing and recording the Fact and Fiction (TN006) album. Commenced in May it wasn't finally finished and released until December. Mitten doubled on keyboards in Battersby's absence and a few gigs were done as a four-piece that autumn.

During the summer, an offer to appear on TV came "out of the blue" and so the band performed East of Eden on the first ever David Essex Showcase. It was screened on BBC1 on 26 June 1982.

Two tracks which didn't find room on the Fact and Fiction album, Eleanor Rigby and East of Eden were released on single (REV009) in October 1982. Battersby then rejoined in December 1982, completing the line-up for the Fact and Fiction Tour which began in January 1983 and included the band's first headline gig at the Marquee. Bullet & Pinnacle Records took over distribution of the new album.

A new epic track, "The Collector", was performed and demoed during the first half of 1983.

In August 1983, the band once again performed at the Reading Festival. CBS records seemed poised to offer a recording deal after four demos were recorded for CBS the previous May.

=== Departure of Mann ===
In November 1983, Mann left after two sell-out gigs at the Marquee, which were recorded for a live album, Live and Let Live. Mann commenced a solo career, and was replaced by vocalist/songwriter Andy Sears (ex Canis Major, Isis, Rapid Apple, and Silva) in December.

=== Consolidation ===
In January 1984, the band began an extensive period of touring with Andy Sears, coinciding with the release of the Live And let Live LP on the Music For Nations label (Cat. No. MFN18). Highlights included a slot supporting Pallas at Hammersmith Odeon, London, in March and several more gigs at the band's second home the Marquee Club – including one which was filmed. This concert went out "live" in several European countries and was recorded for subsequent broadcast in the UK as part of a series: "Live From London". Twelfth Night's performance has never been broadcast, but was later released on video entitled "The Creep Show" and a DVD "Live From London".

Immediately after touring the band signed a management and publishing deal with Hit and Run Music, joining Genesis and Peter Gabriel amongst others at the company.

While most of summer 1984 was spent preparing new material, including a major new song Take A Look, the band broke cover in July to play their first major London headline at the Dominion Theatre. It was a great success with some 1,500 people attending. In August the band travelled to Liverpool to record the Art and Illusion album with Gil Norton (of "Echo & the Bunnymen" fame) producing. Soon after its release in October it reached No. 83 in the national chart. The tour saw the band playing much larger venues than before and included the Dominion Theatre again and what turned out to be their only gig outside the UK, in Marburg, Germany.

1985 started with a couple of special birthday gigs at the Marquee under the pseudonym Jan Six and the Cryptk Clues which sold out in advance through the fan club. Most of the rest of the first half of the year was spent writing new material, some of which was tried out during the Corner of the World tour in May.

It seemed that the band were at last going to get a major record deal when Charisma Records decided to sign them. In July, however, the company went bust. Not dispirited the band played a charity gig (Wycombe Live Aid) followed by three consecutive nights at the Marquee – their 14th, 15th and 16th successive sell-out gigs there.

By September the band had selected the songs for the next album and began pre-production with producer John L. Walters. Recording of the album began November, and in December the band signed a major record deal with Virgin Records, who had by now taken over Charisma. The album was premiered at a special "showcase" concert at the Marquee in April 1986.

In May another special concert, this time at the London Town and Country Club, was filmed by the BBC, with Blue Powder Monkey being subsequently shown on "Old Grey Whistle Test". The concert was also recorded for Radio 1, but was not eventually broadcast. In June, Virgin released Shame as a single b/w Blue Powder Monkey. In July the album Twelfth Night was released, followed soon after by second single Take a Look b/w Blondon Fair. Though receiving critical acclaim the overall sales of the album were disappointing, though it went straight in at No. 1 in Reading's local chart. Before the end of the year the band once again played Hammersmith Odeon in London.

=== Departure of Sears and Mitten ===
Andy Sears left the band in late 1986, severely disappointed with the complete lack of direction and promotional strategy displayed by Virgin. Sears was replaced by Martyn Watson from Pookah Makes Three. After initial rehearsals as a five-piece, Clive Mitten also left early in 1987 to run a recording studio. The contract with Virgin was terminated shortly after. The band continued briefly as a four-piece with Watson doubling on bass. The last set of songs written by Revell, Devoil, Battersby and Watson received a one-off live airing when the band supported Geoff Mann at one of his Marquee gigs. Following this, Twelfth Night quietly split.

=== Interregnum ===
In 1988, during one of the frequent calls between band members the subject of the unrecorded song The Collector was discussed. Mitten offered studio time, and so in May the "original" line-up (Revell, Devoil, Mitten, Mann and Battersby) reunited to record the song, along with a new version of Love Song. After careful deliberation the band offered a compilation of these and others to M.F.N in the form of the album Collector's Item which was finally released in early 1991.

Geoff Mann died of cancer in February 1993. In 1996, Andy Sears went to live in Spain, where he became actively involved in various projects, including an appearance at the Tiana festival (Barcelona), originally planned as a Twelfth Night reunion. In 2006, Sears was invited to supply all the backing vocals for a new Galadriel album, Calibrated Collision Course, released in December 2008.

In the period since the band's demise, a number of archive live recordings have become officially available from Brian Devoil's archives and a new compilation album, Voices in the Night was released in 2007.

=== Reunion ===
Quite unexpectedly in June 2007, Clive Mitten and Andy Sears announced a one-off gig performing Twelfth Night material to take place in November 2007. By July, it had been confirmed that they would be billed as Twelfth Night, and in September, a 2nd gig was added and both Andy Revell and Brian Devoil were revealed as part of the line-up, with Mark Spencer (formerly the vocalist in 80s prog band LaHost, Andy Sears' one time flatmate, and an old friend of the band) replacing Rick Battersby. The band were invited to headline the 10th Tiana Festival in Barcelona in May 2008 – their second only concert outside of the UK, the previous being a concert in Germany in 1984. Additional gigs were added in the UK, and at one of these, Geoff Mann's son James was invited by Andy Sears to accompany him on Love Song.

Play On, the official history of the band, was published in December 2009, just as the band announced their next gig: as headliners of the Progeny Festival in May 2010. Five other dates were subsequently announced, along with a revised line-up that included Roy Keyworth (guitar) and Dean Baker (keyboards) from the UK band Galahad in place of the unavailable Andy Revell.

In 2010, Twelfth Night were invited to headline the Friday night of the V Night of The Prog festival at Loreley, with Marillion headlining the Saturday night. Despite horrendous technical problems, the band were extremely well received.

MMX, a new live double DVD and CD, was released in November 2010 and represents the band's first 'new' material since 1986. Sears toured extensively as a solo artist in 2011.

From 2012 the band effectively split into two: founder members Devoil, Mitten and Revell, with Spencer and Baker, performed several dates as The Cryptic Clues. Spencer also joined Baker and Keyworth as the bassist in Galahad. Meanwhile, Twelfth Night (now with Devoil, Sears, Keyworth, Baker and newcomer Andy Faulkner) performed at the final edition of North East Art Rock Festival in June 2012. This was Sears' last performance, who confirmed his departure in November 2012 in order to compose new material and pursue other musical projects.

The Cryptic Clues performed a 'farewell' gig in London in December 2012, preceded by a warm-up gig as special guests at Danfest 2 at the Leicester Musician. The Cryptic Clues line-up was officially billed as Twelfth Night in a one-off gig in London in May 2014.

Devoil, Revell and Spencer, with guests, recorded a new studio version of the band's most famous song Sequences in 2018, released on 11 November 2018. This same trio reunited in December 2022 to record a new arrangement of the song Fact and Fiction for the compilation The Food Of Love.

== Personnel ==
=== Members ===
- Dean Baker – keyboards (2010, 2012, 2014, 2018)
- Rick Battersby – keyboards (1979–1981, 1982–1987, 1988)
- Brian Devoil – drums (1978–1987, 1988, 2007–2008, 2010, 2012, 2014, 2018, 2022)
- Andy Faulkner – bass (2012, 2018)
- Roy Keyworth – guitar (2010, 2012)
- Geoff Mann – vocals (1979, 1981–1983, 1988; died 1993)
- Electra McLeod – vocals (1980)
- Clive Mitten – bass, keyboards, guitar (1978–1987, 1988, 2007–2008, 2010, 2012, 2014)
- Andy Revell – guitar (1978–1987, 1988, 2007–2008, 2012, 2014, 2018, 2022)
- Andy Sears – vocals, keyboards, guitar (1983–1986, 2007–2008, 2010, 2012)
- Mark Spencer – guitar, bass, keyboards, vocals (2007–2008, 2010, 2012, 2014, 2018, 2022)
- Martyn Watson – vocals, bass (1986–1987)

=== Lineups ===
1978–1979	1979	1979–1980	1980
Brian Devoil – drums; Clive Mitten – bass, keyboards, guitar; Andy Revell – guitar	Brian Devoil – drums; Clive Mitten – bass, keyboards, guitar; Andy Revell – guitar; Rick Battersby – keyboards; Geoff Mann – vocals	Brian Devoil – drums; Clive Mitten – bass, keyboards, guitar; Andy Revell – guitar; Rick Battersby – keyboards	Brian Devoil – drums; Clive Mitten – bass, keyboards, guitar; Andy Revell – guitar; Rick Battersby – keyboards; Electra McLeod – vocals
1980–1981	1981	1981–1982	1982–1983
Brian Devoil – drums; Clive Mitten – bass, keyboards, guitar; Andy Revell – guitar; Rick Battersby – keyboards	Brian Devoil – drums; Clive Mitten – bass, keyboards, guitar; Andy Revell – guitar; Rick Battersby – keyboards; Geoff Mann – vocals	Brian Devoil – drums; Clive Mitten – bass, keyboards, guitar; Andy Revell – guitar; Geoff Mann – vocals	Brian Devoil – drums; Clive Mitten – bass, keyboards, guitar; Andy Revell – guitar; Geoff Mann – vocals; Rick Battersby – keyboards
1983–1986	1986–1987	1987	1987–1988
Brian Devoil – drums; Clive Mitten – bass, keyboards, guitar; Andy Revell – guitar; Rick Battersby – keyboards; Andy Sears – vocals, keyboards, guitar	Brian Devoil – drums; Clive Mitten – bass, keyboards, guitar; Andy Revell – guitar; Rick Battersby – keyboards; Martyn Watson – vocals	Brian Devoil – drums; Andy Revell – guitar; Rick Battersby – keyboards; Martyn Watson – vocals, bass	Disbanded
1988	1988–1994	1994	1994–2007
Brian Devoil – drums; Andy Revell – guitar; Rick Battersby – keyboards; Geoff Mann – vocals; Clive Mitten – bass, keyboards, guitar	Disbanded	Brian Devoil – drums; Clive Mitten – bass, keyboards, guitar; Andy Revell – guitar; Rick Battersby – keyboards; Andy Sears – vocals, keyboards, guitar	Disbanded
2007–2010	2010–2011	2012 (The Cryptic Clues)	2012 (Twelfth Night)
Brian Devoil – drums; Andy Revell – guitar; Clive Mitten – bass, keyboards, guitar; Andy Sears – vocals, keyboards, guitar; Mark Spencer – guitar, bass, keyboards, vocals	Brian Devoil – drums; Clive Mitten – bass, keyboards, guitar; Mark Spencer – guitar, bass, keyboards, vocals; Andy Sears – vocals, keyboards, guitar; Dean Baker – keyboards; Roy Keyworth – guitar	Brian Devoil – drums; Clive Mitten – bass, keyboards, guitar; Mark Spencer – guitar, bass, keyboards, vocals; Dean Baker – keyboards; Andy Revell – guitar	Brian Devoil – drums; Dean Baker – keyboards; Andy Faulkner – bass; Roy Keyworth – guitar; Andy Sears – vocals, keyboards, guitar
2012–2014	2014	2014–2018	2018–2022
inactive	Brian Devoil – drums; Dean Baker – keyboards; Clive Mitten – bass, keyboards, guitar; Andy Revell – guitar; Mark Spencer – guitar, bass, keyboards, vocals	inactive	Brian Devoil – drums; Andy Revell – guitar; Mark Spencer – guitar, bass, keyboards, vocals; with: Dean Baker – keyboards in 2018; Andy Faulkner – bass in 2018

== Recordings by Different Line-ups ==
Dates	Recordings	Devoil	Revell	Mitten	Battersby	Mann	McLeod	Sears	Watson	Spencer	Baker	Keyworth	Faulkner
February 1978 -September 1978 (as Andy Revell / Andy Revell Band)	live dates only	x	x	-	-	-	-	-	-	-	-	-	-
September 1978 -August 1979 (as Andy Revell Band until December 1978)	SKAN	x	x	x	-	-	-	-	-	-	-	-	-
August 1979 -Summer 1980	The First Tape Album	x	x	x	x	(guest)	-	-	-	-	-	-	-
Summer 1980 -November 1980	Early Material three of these tracks available on Voices In The Night, and one on the reissue of Live At The Target	x	x	x	x	-	x	-	-	-	-	-	-
November 1980 -August 1981	A Midsummer Night's Dream; Live At The Target; Entropy	x	x	x	x	-	-	-	-	-	-	-	-
August 1981 -November 1981	Smiling At Grief (part)	x	x	x	x	x	-	-	-	-	-	-	-
November 1981 -November 1982	Smiling At Grief (part); Smiling At Grief ... Live; Fact And Fiction one track on Voices in the Night	x	x	x	-	x	-	-	-	-	-	-	-
November 1982 -November 1983	Flashbacks; Live and Let Live two tracks on Collector's Item; 5 tracks on Voices in the Night	x	x	x	x	x	-	-	-	-	-	-	-
December 1983 -December 1986	Live From London; Art And Illusion; Corner Of The World; Twelfth Night XII; 6 tracks on Voices on the Night	x	x	x	x	-	-	x	-	-	-	-	-
December 1987	rehearsals only	x	x	x	x	-	-	-	x	-	-	-	-
January 1987 -October 1987	5 tracks on Voices In The Night (2007)	x	x	-	x	-	-	-	x	-	-	-	-
May 1988	two tracks for Collector's Item	x	x	x	x	x	-	-	-	-	-	-	-
March 1994	one track for Mannerisms, also available on Voices in the Night	x	x	x	x	-	-	x	-	-	-	-	-
September 2007-January 2010	live dates, 2007–2008	x	x	x	-	-	-	x	-	x	-	-	-
January 2010-December 2010	live dates, 2010; MMX	x	-	x	-	-	-	x	-	x	x	x	-
January–December 2012	live dates (billed as the Cryptic Clues)	x	x	x	-	-	-	-	-	x	x	-	-
June 2012	live date, June 2012	x	-	-	-	-	-	x	-	-	x	x	x
May 2014	live date, May 2014	x	x	x	-	-	-	-	-	x	x	-	-
2018	Sequences recording sessions, no live performances	x	x	-	-	-	-	-	-	x	x	-	x
2022	The Food Of Love recording sessions, no live performances	x	x	-	-	-	-	-	-	x	-	-	-
		Devoil	Revell	Mitten	Battersby	Mann	McLeod	Sears	Watson	Spencer	Baker	Keyworth	Faulkner

== Discography ==
=== Tapes ===
- Skan: March 1979
- The First Tape Album: January 1980
- Early Material: October 1980
- Smiling at Grief: January 1982, re-released on CD in 1997 with 4 bonus tracks, in 2009 as the Definitive Edition with 14 additional tracks and in 2022 with all new (re)mixes from the original master tapes

=== Albums ===
==== Studio ====
- Fact and Fiction: December 1982, re-released on CD in 2002 with 7 bonus tracks; re-released again on CD in 2018 as the Definitive Edition with 31 bonus tracks
- Art and Illusion: October 1984, re-released on CD in 2003 with 7 bonus tracks; re-released again on CD in 2010 as the Definitive Edition with 12 bonus tracks
- Twelfth Night XII: July 1986, re-released on CD in 2005 with 6 bonus tracks
- Sequences: November 2018

==== Live ====
- Live at the Target: February 1981, re-released on CD in 2004 with 3 bonus tracks, re-released as the Definitive Edition in 2012 with 9 different bonus tracks
- Live and Let Live: January 1984, re-released on CD in 1996 with 3 bonus tracks, re-released as the Definitive Edition in 2012 with 7 additional bonus tracks
- MMX: November 2010
- A Night to Remember: November 2019

=== Compilations ===
- Collector's Item: 1991, reissued with some different tracks 2001
- Voices in the Night: 2007, live and studio recordings from 1980 to 1997
- Nice Enough To... Join In?: 2020 bandcamp sampler
- All You Can... Eat?: 2020 bandcamp sampler
- Food Of Love: 2022 bandcamp sampler with new recording of Fact and Fiction

=== Archive releases ===
- Smiling at Grief ... Live: March 2003, live recording from 1981
- A Midsummer's Night Dream: 2005, live recording from 1980
- Corner of the World Tour: 2005, live recording from 1985
- Live From London: 2005, live recording from 1984
- Entropy: 2006, live recording from 1981
- Flashbacks: 2006, live recording from 1983
- Night Vision: 2006, live recording from 1984
- The Skan Demos / The First Tape Album: 2013, live recordings from 1979 and studio recordings from 1980
- Virgin on the Ridiculous: 2020, outtakes, demos and live tracks from 1984 to 1986

=== Singles ===
- The Cunning Man / Für Helene I: 7" single December 1980
- East of Eden / Eleanor Rigby: 7" single 1982
- Shame / Shame (ful mix): 7" and 12" single June 1986
- Take a Look (part 4) / Blondon Fair (short version) 7" single August 1986
- Take a Look (part 4) / Blondon Fair (long version) / Take A Look (album version) 12" single August 1986

=== DVDs ===
- Reading Rock '83: April 2010, live recording from 1983
- Live From London: live recording from 1984, previously released on VHS as The Creepshow
- Play On Archive: 2009, live and studio recordings from 1978 to 2008
- MMX: November 2010
- A Night to Remember: November 2019
