= Giant Electric Pea =

UK record label

- Founded: 1992
- Founder: Michael Holmes, Thomas Waber, Laurence Dyer, Martin Orford
- Status: Active
- Distributor(s): RSK Entertainment
- Genre: Progressive rock, progressive metal
- Country of origin: UK, Germany
- Location: UK
- Official website: gep.co.uk

Giant Electric Pea (often abbreviated as GEP) is an independent music label based in London and Berlin. Their releases consist of progressive rock, neo-prog and progressive metal music albums.

== History ==
Giant Electric Pea was formed in 1992 by Michael Holmes, Thomas Waber (also founder of European independent music labels, Inside Out Music and Superball Music), Laurence Dyer and Martin Orford. The label was originally intended as a vehicle for IQ's 1993 album, 'Ever' but went on to become the first independent music label for progressive rock, quickly establishing itself within the genre by signing new bands such as Spock's Beard, Jadis and Threshold to the label. GEP have also released albums by established artists such as John Wetton and Renaissance.

=== Management ===
Giant Electric Pea is now managed by four directors:

- Michael Holmes – CEO, also known for his work with progressive rock band IQ and solo project The Lens.
- Rob Aubrey – Technical Director, sound engineer and owner of recording studio 'Aubitt Studios'.
- Peter Huth – Marketing Director and Berlin-based journalist, author and editor-in-chief of German Sunday newspaper Welt am Sonntag.
- Thomas Waber – Business Director. Waber is also founder of European independent record labels, Inside Out Music and Superball Music who are responsible for many of today's Progressive artists.

== Artists ==
- IQ
- Big Big Train
- Synaesthesia
- The Lens
- Steve Thorne
- Martin Orford
- Renaissance
- Spock's Beard
- Niadem's Ghost
- Threshold
- John Wetton
- Damanek
- Southern Empire

== See also ==
- Inside Out Music
- IQ
