= Solstice (progressive rock band) =

British progressive rock band

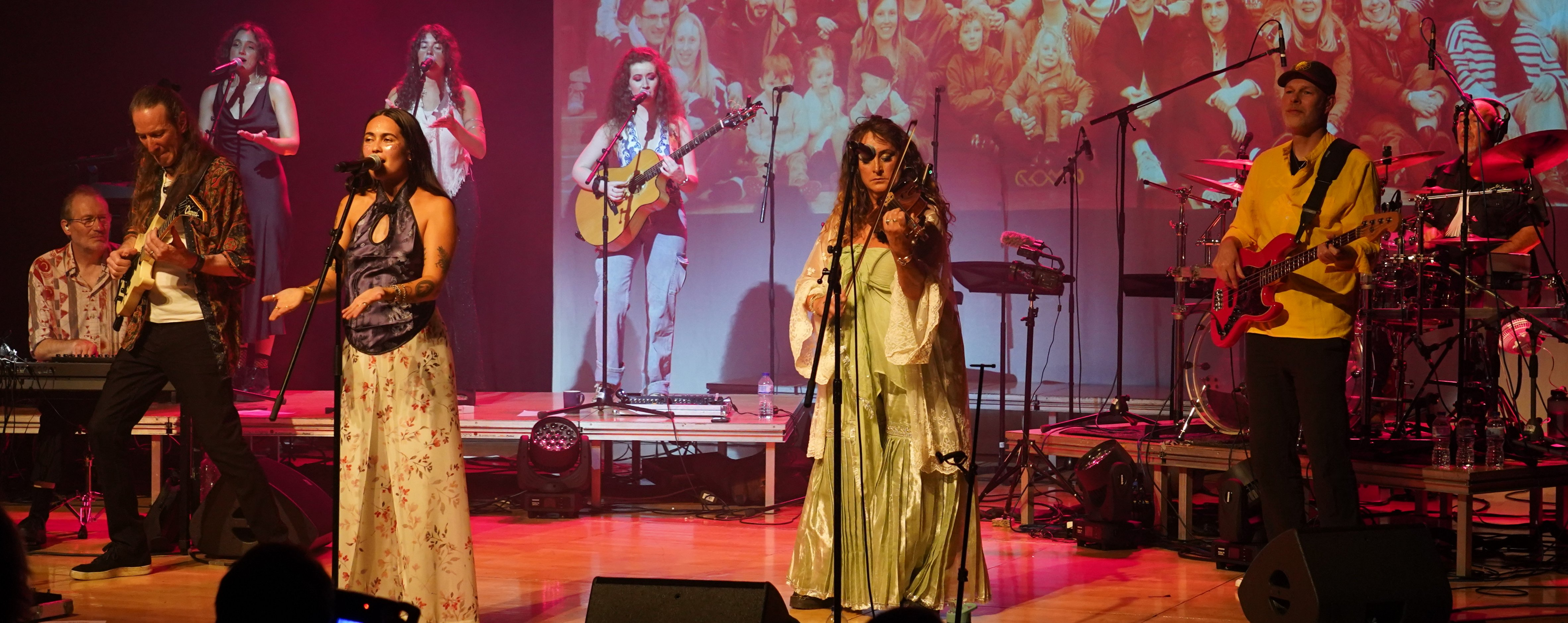
- Solstice in 2025

Background information
- Origin: Milton Keynes, England
- Genres: Neo-prog; progressive rock; folk
- Years active: 1980–present
- Labels: EMI; Capitol
- Members: Andy Glass; Jess Holland; Peter Hemsley; Steven McDaniel; Jenny Newman; Robin Phillips; Ebony Buckle; Dyane Crutcher; Leoni Jane Kennedy
- Past members: Emma Brown; Ken Bowley; Clive Bunker; Barbara Deason; Marc Elton; Mark Hawkins; Heidi Kemp; Sandy Leigh; Shelley Patt; Sue Robinson; Craig Sunderland; Martin Wright
- Website: solsticeprog.uk//

Solstice are an English neo-prog, folk rock band formed in Milton Keynes in 1980. They are led by guitarist Andy Glass, who is the sole founding member still in the band. AllMusic described the group as a "progressive rock band with heavy folk and new age touches".

== History ==
The band formed in 1980, and performed BBC sessions and received national music press coverage before splitting in 1985 (with one guest appearance in 1986). Their only album release in this period was 1984's Silent Dance.

Interest generated by a CD reissue of Silent Dance led to a reunion in the nineties with two studio releases, New Life and Circles, and a live album, The Cropredy Set.

Guitarist Andy Glass once more put the band on hold in order to focus on band 3sticks. A DVD release of the Cropredy performance preceded another reunion in 2007, with the entire back catalogue being remastered and issued in expanded "Definitive Edition" form. The band then toured the UK and, for the first time, mainland Europe. In Spring 2022, Solstice undertook an extensive tour of the UK and mainland Europe in support of the Sia album. They also previewed a track from their then-to-be-released seventh studio album. Anyone pledging to pre-order the as yet unnamed album also received a free download of "Solstice Live at MK11" - a digital only live album recorded at the Crauford Arms in Wolverton, Bucks, UK on two nights in September 2021.

The new album, entitled Light Up, was launched at a one-day festival, also called Light Up and staged at the MK11 venue on 6 November 2022. Pre-ordered copies of the CD version were available at the show and had been distributed the previous week. The band toured extensively to support Light UP into 2023 whilst at the same time previewing new tracks for a third album in the Sia / Light Up Trilogy, as originally conceived by Andy Glass. The tour included a slot at Glastonbury Festival as well as regional shows in Colchester, Wavendon, Kidderminster, Great Yarmouth, a return to the Cropredy Festival with a mid-afternoon slot and opened the final day of Towersey Festival in Venue 65. The album received extensive critical acclaim in the music press and online.

Band members Andy Glass, Peter Hemsley, and Jenny Newman also work together in the band "3 Sticks".

== Members ==
=== Current ===
- Andy Glass – guitars
- Jess Holland – vocals
- Peter Hemsley – drums
- Steven McDaniel – keyboards
- Jenny Newman – violin
- Robin Phillips – bass
- Ebony Buckle – backing vocals, additional keyboards
- Dyane Crutcher – backing vocals
- Leoni Jane Kennedy- guitar, backing vocals

=== Former ===
- Emma Brown – vocals
- Ken Bowley – bass
- Clive Bunker – drums
- Barbara Deason – vocals
- Marc Elton – violin, keyboards
- Mark Hawkins – bass
- Heidi Kemp – vocals
- Sandy Leigh – vocals
- Shelley Patt – vocals
- Sue Robinson – vocals
- Jen Sanin – vocals
- Johanna Stroud - vocals
- Craig Sunderland – bass
- Martin Wright – drums

== Discography ==
=== Studio albums ===
- Silent Dance (1984)
- New Life (1993)
- Circles (1997)
- Spirit (2010)
- Prophecy (2013)
- Sia (released 23 November 2020)
- Light Up (2022)
- Clann (2025)

=== Live albums ===
- The Cropredy Set (2002)
- Kindred Spirits (2011)
- Live in Veruno (2022)
- Return to Cropredy (2024)

=== Compilation albums ===
- Pathways (1998)
- The Beginners Guide To Solstice (2023)
