= Peter Nicholls (musician) =

British singer

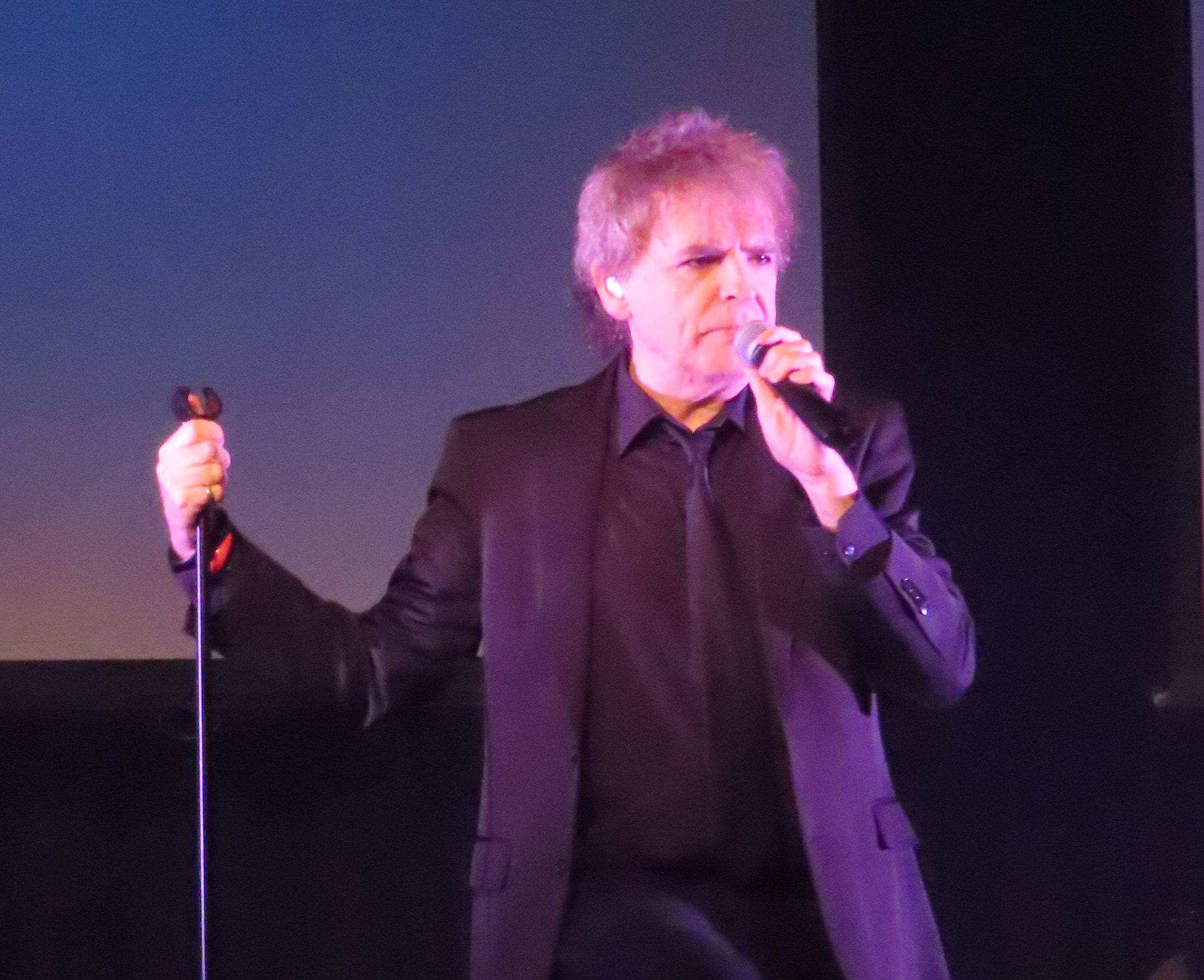
Nicholls with IQ in 2021.

Peter Nicholls (born 13 February 1959) is the lead singer of the progressive rock band IQ. Nicholls left the band briefly in the late 1980s to form the alternative rock band Niadem's Ghost but returned in 1990. He is known for his entertaining if somewhat reticent and eccentric stage presence.

Another interest of Nicholls is painting; he painted the album covers for IQ's second, third and sixth albums, respectively Tales from the Lush Attic, The Wake and Ever, among others.

In the 1980s, Nicholls also worked as an editor and letterer for comics publishers London Editions Magazines.
