= Neo-prog =

Subgenre of progressive rock

- Other names: Neo-progressive rock
- Stylistic origins: Progressive rock; hard rock; funk; punk rock
- Cultural origins: Early 1980s in England, UK

Other topics
- New prog; post-progressive

Neo-progressive rock (commonly abbreviated neo-prog) is a subgenre of progressive rock that developed in the UK in the early 1980s. The genre's most popular band, Marillion, achieved mainstream success in the decade. Several bands from the genre have continued to record and tour.

== Characteristics ==
Neo-prog is characterised by deeply emotional content, often delivered via dramatic lyrics and a generous use of imagery and theatricality on-stage. The music is mostly the product of careful composition, relying less heavily on improvised jamming. The subgenre relies very much on clean, melodic and emotional electric guitar solos, combined with keyboards. The main musical influences on the neo-prog genre are bands from the first wave of progressive rock such as early Genesis, Camel, and to a lesser extent Van der Graaf Generator and Pink Floyd. Funk, hard rock and punk rock were also influences on the genre.

== History ==
In the book The Progressive Rock Files, author Jerry Lucky dedicates a chapter to neo-progressive rock with the title "A Neo Beginning!", stating that this subgenre "surfaced in late 1981, bearing testimony to the lasting values of this musical form" of progressive rock, but distinguishing it from this main genre, saying, "Sure the sound was a bit different ... a little more bite, a little more eighties". Later in the same book, Jerry Lucky suggested that neo-prog peaked in the mid-1980s: "As 1984 dawned all of the British neo-progressive rock bands release material." Famous neo-prog albums were Marillion's Fugazi, Pallas' The Sentinel, Pendragon's Fly High Fall Far, Twelfth Night's Art and Illusion, Solstice's Silent Dance, IQ's The Wake, and Quasar's Fire in the Sky.

A predecessor to this genre was the Enid, who fused rock with classical but were more heavily influenced by Ralph Vaughan Williams than by more modern composers. The change of approach can be heard in the shift toward shorter compositions and a keyboard-based sound in the 1980s Rush albums Signals, Grace Under Pressure, Power Windows and Hold Your Fire. Neo-progressive bands emphasised individual solos instead of group improvisation, and they included more world music elements. Lyrics became more personal and less esoteric. Concept albums were still created, but not as frequently and on a smaller scale. Digital synthesizers took over many of the roles formerly filled by bulkier keyboards such as Mellotrons and organs, and their modern sound tended to minimise the folk influences that had been typical of 1970s progressive rock. Heavy metal bands such as Iron Maiden and Queensrÿche began to explore the mythological themes and extended concepts that had previously been the territory of progressive rock.

Early neo-prog was marked by sophisticated lyrics and often dark themes. While the accessibility of neo-prog to the mainstream is debatable, the form did generally seem more radio-friendly, with shorter and less complex songs than earlier progressive rock. Nonetheless, neo-prog never achieved the heights of popular success that the first wave of progressive rock in the 1970s did, with only one band, Marillion, achieving arena status. Marillion achieved major success across Europe in particular and produced eight top ten UK albums between 1983 and 1994, peaking in popularity with their album Misplaced Childhood in 1985, which topped the UK Albums Chart and produced two top five hit singles in the UK. The album has been called "the cornerstone of the entire 'neo-prog' movement". Following this peak, neo-prog declined in popularity as a genre, although several bands have continued to record and tour, with Marillion and their ex-singer Fish in particular both maintaining a large cult following.

== Bibliography ==
- Covach, John; Boone, Graeme M., eds. (1997). Understanding Rock: Essays in Musical Analysis. New York: Oxford University Press. ISBN 0-19-510005-0.
- Hegarty, Paul; Halliwell, Martin (2011). Beyond and Before: Progressive Rock Since the 1960s. New York: The Continuum International Publishing Group. ISBN 978-0-8264-2332-0.
