= English Electric (disambiguation) =

English Electric (EE) was a British industrial manufacturer.

English Electric may also refer to:

- English Electric (album), a 2013 album by Orchestral Manoeuvres in the Dark
- English Electric Part One, a 2012 album by Big Big Train
- English Electric Part Two, a 2013 album by Big Big Train
- English Electric: Full Power, a 2013 compilation by Big Big Train combining the two English Electric albums
