= Folklore (Big Big Train album) =

Studio album by Big Big Train
- Released: 27 May 2016
- Studio: English Electric Studios; Aubitt Studios; Real World Studios; Sweetwater Studios; Ashwood Studios; Regal Lane Studios
- Genre: Progressive rock, neo-prog
- Length: 69:03 (CD version); 81:15 (Double LP version)
- Label: English Electric
- Producer: Big Big Train

Big Big Train chronology
Wassail (2015)	Folklore (2016)	Grimspound (2017)

Folklore is the ninth studio album by English progressive rock band Big Big Train. Released on 27 May 2016, it was recorded at English Electric Studios, produced by Big Big Train, and mixed and mastered at Aubitt Studios by Rob Aubrey. It is the first studio album to feature Rachel Hall and then-Beardfish lead vocalist Rikard Sjöblom as official members.

The album was released in multiple formats: standard and High Res downloads, as a single CD, and as a double-LP vinyl release that features two additional tracks, "Mudlarks" and "Lost Rivers of London", both of which were previously released on the 2015 EP Wassail. Both versions of the album contain the title track from Wassail, meaning that the vinyl release features all three of the original songs on the EP.

== Reception ==
Reviews were largely positive for this release, the ProgReport saying "from the first listen is so breathtaking and magnificent, that more listens are welcomed". Concluding with "All in all, this is a sprawling collection of brilliantly told stories with even more impressive music".

== Track listing ==
=== CD Release ===
No.	Title	Writer(s)	Length
1.	"Folklore"	David Longdon	7:33
2.	"London Plane"	Greg Spawton	10:13
3.	"Along the Ridgeway"	Spawton	6:12
4.	"Salisbury Giant"	Spawton	3:37
5.	"The Transit of Venus Across the Sun"	Spawton	7:20
6.	"Wassail"	Longdon	6:57
7.	"Winkie"	Longdon	8:25
8.	"Brooklands"	Spawton	12:44
9.	"Telling the Bees"	Longdon	6:02

=== Vinyl Release ===
Side one
No.	Title	Writer(s)	Length
1.	"Folklore"	Longdon	7:33
2.	"Along the Ridgeway"	Spawton	6:12
3.	"Salisbury Giant"	Spawton	3:37

Side two
No.	Title	Writer(s)	Length
1.	"London Plane"	Spawton	10:13
2.	"Mudlarks*"	Spawton	6:10
3.	"Lost Rivers of London*"	Spawton	6:02

Side three
No.	Title	Writer(s)	Length
1.	"The Transit of Venus Across the Sun"	Spawton	7:20
2.	"Wassail"	Longdon	6:57
3.	"Winkie"	Longdon	8:25

Side four
No.	Title	Writer(s)	Length
1.	"Brooklands"	Spawton	12:44
2.	"Telling the Bees"	Longdon	6:02

*Vinyl-only tracks (though both were previously released on CD on the band's 2015 EP Wassail)

== Personnel ==
- David Longdon – lead vocals, flute, acoustic guitar, mandolin, percussion
- Nick D'Virgilio – drums, percussion, backing vocals
- Greg Spawton – bass guitar, bass pedals, acoustic guitar, backing vocals
- Andy Poole – acoustic guitar, mandolin, keyboards, backing vocals
- Dave Gregory – electric guitars
- Danny Manners – keyboards, double bass
- Rachel Hall – violin, viola, cello, backing vocals
- Rikard Sjöblom – electric guitars, keyboards, accordion, backing vocals
