= The Prog =

The Prog may refer to:

- The Princeton Progressive, a progressive magazine at Princeton University
- Prog, a British magazine dedicated to progressive rock music
- Progressive Field, a baseball stadium in Cleveland, Ohio
