= Grand Tour (Big Big Train album) =

Studio album by Big Big Train
- Released: 17 May 2019
- Studio: English Electric Studios, Abbey Road Studios, Real World Studios, Sweetwater Studios
- Genre: Progressive rock
- Length: 74:11
- Label: English Electric
- Producer: Longdon, Spawton

Big Big Train chronology
The Second Brightest Star (2017)	Grand Tour (2019)	Common Ground (2021)

Grand Tour is the twelfth studio album by the English progressive rock band Big Big Train. It contains all new songs unlike the previous, The Second Brightest Star. Thematically it broadens the lyrical landscape for the group into the European world, previously having a largely domestic British focus. It moves from English folklore and landscape, to the 17th and 18th century habit of well-to-do Europeans going on the 'Grand Tour' to experience a wider circle of art and science. It is the last studio album to feature band members Dave Gregory, Rachel Hall, and Danny Manners who left in 2020, and first without co-founder Andy Poole, who had departed in January 2018.

== Reception ==
Professional ratings
Review scores
Source	Rating
Daily Express	5/5 stars
The Times	3/5 stars
The Imaginative Conservative	(very favorable)

Initially well received, The Times says of this release, "A prog rock album that doesn't yield its secrets straight away and repays repeated listening". Tony Colvill in his review had been critical of the last two releases but then writes of this offering, "it's something new, a little bit different, but to the same high standards," presumably harking back to the 'railway inspired' subject content of English Electric: Full Power. He continues to heap praise on this offering with repeated and positive comparisons with Genesis both vocally and instrumentally. Daily Express writer Paul Davies also make comparisons to Genesis and adds a reference to Queen. Noting the subject of the Renaissance when referring to progressive music in general, he clearly underlines the band's significance. He assigns a rating of 5 out of 5. The album won the award of Best Album at the 2019 Progressive Music Awards.

== Track listing ==
Grand Tour
No.	Title	Lyrics	Music	Length
1.	"Novum Organum"	Greg Spawton	Nick D'Virgilio, Spawton	2:25
2.	"Alive"	David Longdon	Longdon	4:34
3.	"The Florentine"	Longdon	Longdon	8:17
4.	"Roman Stone": "Foundation"; "Rise" (instrumental); "Ne Plus Ultra"; "Fall" (instrumental); "Legacy"	Spawton	Spawton	13:33
5.	"Pantheon" (instrumental)		D'Virgilio	6:12
6.	"Theodora in Green and Gold"	Spawton	D'Virgilio, Longdon	5:32
7.	"Ariel": "Come Unto These Yellow Sands"; "Noises, Sounds and Sweet Airs"; "New Place"; "O! There Are Spirits of the Air"; "Music, When Soft Voices Die"; "Casa Magni, 1822"; "Approach, My Ariel, Come"; "Coda: The Triumph of Life"	Longdon	Longdon	14:28
8.	"Voyager": "On the Ocean"; "The Farthest Shore"; "The Pillars of Hercules"; "Further Beyond" (instrumental); "Grand Finale" (instrumental); "The Space Between the Stars"; "Homecoming"	Spawton	Spawton	14:20
9.	"Homesong"	Spawton	Spawton	4:50
Total length:				74:11

Japan bonus track
No.	Title	Lyrics	Music	Length
10.	"Journey's End"	Spawton	Spawton	4:38
Total length:				78:32

== Personnel ==
Big Big Train

- Nick D'Virgilio – drums, percussion, backing vocals, co-lead vocals on "Theodora in Green and Gold", additional keyboards, guitars
- Dave Gregory – 6-string and 12-string guitars
- Rachel Hall – violin, backing vocals
- David Longdon – lead vocals, flute, additional keyboards, guitars
- Danny Manners – keyboards
- Rikard Sjöblom – 6-string and 12-string guitars, keyboards on "Theodora in Green and Gold", backing vocals
- Greg Spawton – bass guitar, bass pedals, additional 12-string guitars

Production

- Rob Aubrey – mixing, mastering
- Rachel Hall – string arrangements on Voyager (with Manners & Spawton)
- Dave Desmond – brass arrangements (with Spawton)

== Charts ==
Chart (2019)	Peak position
Scottish Albums (OCC)	12
UK Albums (OCC)	35
