= Prog (magazine) =

British magazine focused on progressive rock

- Cover of issue 151, featuring Marillion
- Editor: Jerry Ewing
- Categories: Music magazine
- Frequency: Monthly
- Founded: 2009
- Company: Future
- Country: United Kingdom
- Based in: London
- Language: English
- Website: loudersound.com/prog

Prog is a British magazine dedicated to progressive rock music, published by Future. The magazine, which is edited by Jerry Ewing, was launched in March 2009 as a spin-off from Classic Rock and covers both past and present artists. Other current staff are Natasha Scharf (Deputy Editor), Russell Fairbrother (Art Editor), Julian Marszalek (News Editor), and Dave Everley (Album Reviews Editor).

== History and profile ==
Prog is published by Future, who are also responsible for its "sister" publications Classic Rock and Metal Hammer.

Prog was published nine times per year until 2012, when its frequency was switched to ten times a year.

According to The Guardian in 2010, the magazine was selling 22,000 copies an issue, half the circulation of the NME. Journalist and broadcaster Gavin Esler described it in 2014 as "one of the few music magazines I can think of whose circulation is healthy".

On 19 December 2016, TeamRock called in the administrators with the loss of 70 jobs, after experiencing financial difficulties. TeamRock's stable of titles including Classic Rock, Metal Hammer, and Prog, temporarily suspended publication.

On 8 January 2017, Prog, along with sister magazines Classic Rock and Metal Hammer, were bought by previous owners Future for £800,000.

On 27 March 2018, the family of Future's UK consumer music magazines including Prog re-branded and became covered under the umbrella title of Louder (also known as Louder Sound), with loudersound.com serving as the main online portal for the publications.

In March 2023, a partnership was established with the internet radio station Progzilla where bands and artists from Prog's "Limelight" and "All Around The World" monthly features would be promoted and played.

The magazine has supported the early careers of artists including Knifeworld, TesseracT, HENGE, and The Fierce and the Dead.

== Progressive Music Awards ==
Prog magazine was also behind the annual Progressive Music Awards that was established in 2012.

=== 2012 winners ===
The 2012 Progressive Music Award winners in full:

- New Blood: TesseracT
- Live Event: Anathema
- Grand Design: Pink Floyd's Immersion Reissues
- Anthem: Squackett's "A Life Within A Day"
- Album of the Year: Rush's Clockwork Angels
- Visionary: Peter Hammill
- Lifetime Achievement: Genesis
- Virtuoso: Carl Palmer
- Guiding Light: Steven Wilson
- Prog God: Rick Wakeman

=== 2013 winners ===
Winners

- Limeling: Sound of Contact
- Breakthrough: Big Big Train
- Anthem: Von Hertzen Brothers, "Flowers and Rust"
- Event: Steve Hackett, Genesis Revisited at Hammersmith Apollo
- Band of the Year: Marillion
- Album: Steven Wilson, The Raven That Refused to Sing (And Other Stories)
- Grand Design: Family Box Set
- Virtuoso: Mike Portnoy
- Visionary: Steve Hillage
- Guiding Light: Thomas Waber, founder of InsideOut
- Lifetime Achievement: Dave Brock
- Prog God: Ian Anderson

=== 2014 winners ===
The 2014 Progressive Music Award winners in full:

- Limelight: Messenger
- Live Event: Rick Wakeman – Journey to the Centre of the Earth 40th Anniversary Tour
- Breakthrough: Syd Arthur
- Anthem: Anathema – Anathema
- The Storm Thorgerson Grand Design: Fish – A Feast of Consequences
- Album of the Year: Transatlantic – Kaleidoscope
- Band of the Year: Dream Theater
- Outer Limits: Uriah Heep
- Virtuoso: Arjen Anthony Lucassen
- Guiding Light: Sonja Kristina
- Visionary: Robert John Godfrey
- Lifetime Achievement: Andrew Latimer
- Prog God: Peter Gabriel

=== 2015 winners ===
The 2015 Progressive Music Award winners in full:

- Limelight (for up-and-coming bands): Heights
- Live event: Marillion Weekends
- Vanguard (for acts who deserve wider recognition): Purson
- Anthem: Public Service Broadcasting – Gagarin
- The Storm Thorgerson grand design (box set design): Steven Wilson – Hand. Cannot. Erase.
- Album of the year: Steven Wilson – Hand. Cannot. Erase.
- Band of the year: Opeth
- Commercial breakthrough: Steven Wilson
- Outer Limits: Roy Wood
- Virtuoso: Danny Thompson
- Guiding light: Roger Dean
- Visionary: Bill Nelson
- Lifetime achievement: Gentle Giant
- Prog God: Tony Banks

=== 2016 winners ===
The 2016 Progressive Music Award winners in full:

- Limelight (for up-and-coming bands): The Anchoress
- Live event: Big Big Train Weekends
- Vanguard (for acts who deserve wider recognition): The Mute Gods
- Anthem: Riverside – Towards The Blue Horizon
- The Storm Thorgerson grand design : Anthony Phillips – Esoteric Reissue Series
- Album of the year: iamthemorning – Lighthouse
- Band of the year: Big Big Train
- Outer Limits: Buggles
- Virtuoso: Jakko Jakszyk
- Guiding light: Andy Summers
- Visionary: Jon Hiseman
- Lifetime achievement: Van der Graaf Generator
- Prog God: Jon Anderson

=== 2017 winners ===
The 2017 Progressive Music Award winners in full:

- Limelight – Beatrix Players
- Video of the Year – King Crimson – Heroes
- Event of the Year – Be Prog! My Friend
- Reissue of the Year – Steve Hillage – Searching For The Spark
- Album Cover of the Year – Tim Bowness – Lost in the Ghost Light
- Album of the Year – Anathema – The Optimist
- International Band of the Year – Opeth
- UK Band of the Year – Marillion
- Outer Limits – Mark King
- Outstanding Musical Achievement – John Miles
- Chris Squire Virtuoso – Steve Hackett
- Visionary – Voivod
- Industry VIP – Max Hole
- Lifetime Achievement – Eddie Jobson
- Prog God – Carl Palmer

=== 2018 winners ===
The 2018 Progressive Music Award winners in full:

- Limelight: Midas Fall
- Video of the Year: Orphaned Land – "Like Orpheus"
- Event of the Year: Space Rocks
- Reissue of the Year: Alan Parsons Project – Eye In The Sky 35th Anniversary Box Set
- Album Cover of the Year: Big Big Train –The Second Brightest Star
- International Band/Artist of the Year: Premiata Forneria Marconi (PFM)
- Album of the Year: To The Bone
- UK Band/Artist of the Year: Steven Wilson
- Outer Limits: Claudia Brücken
- Outstanding Contribution: Gary Brooker
- The Chris Squire Virtuoso: Phil Manzanera
- Visionary: John Lees
- Industry VIP: Kilimanjaro Live
- Lifetime Achievement: Caravan
- Prog God: Steve Howe

=== 2019 winners ===
- Visionary: Arthur Brown
- Album Cover of the Year: Daniel Tompkins – Castles (solo album by Tesseract vocalist)
- Video of the Year: Cellar Darling – "Insomnia"
- Chris Squire Virtuoso: John Petrucci
- Limelight: Jo Quail
- Reissue of the Year: Marillion – Clutching at Straws Deluxe Edition
- Lifetime Achievement: John Lodge
- Event of the Year: Ramblin’ Man Fair – Prog in the Park Stage
- Classic Album: Hawkwind – Warrior on the Edge of Time
- Album of the Year: Big Big Train – Grand Tour
- Outer Limits: Jack Hues
- International Band of the Year: Dream Theater
- Industry VIP: Tony Smith
- UK Band of the Year: Haken
- Prog God: Nick Mason
