= The Sane Day =

Studio album by Beardfish
- Released: 23 October 2005
- Recorded: 2004 – April 2005
- Studio: Overlook Studio, The Horsewall Studios, Studio Blå Rummet
- Genre: Progressive rock
- Length: 111:31
- Label: Self-released, re-released in 2007 by Progress Records
- Producer: Beardfish

Beardfish chronology
Från en plats du ej kan se (2003)	The Sane Day (2005)	Sleeping in Traffic: Part One (2007)

The Sane Day is the second studio album by Swedish progressive rock band Beardfish.

== Track listing ==
All songs written by Rikard Sjöblom.

=== Disc one ===
No.	Title	Length
1.	"A Love Story"	12:47
2.	"Sun Is the Devil"	2:08
3.	"Mudhill"	5:39
4.	"The Gooberville Ballroom Dancer"	6:57
5.	"Igloo on Two" (instrumental)	6:31
6.	"Tall Tales"	9:25
7.	"The Basic Blues"	5:18
8.	"The Summit"	7:10
Total length:		55:55

=== Disc two ===
No.	Title	Length
1.	"The Sane Day" (instrumental)	6:06
2.	"Blue Moon"	4:37
3.	"Do You Remember Fun Mom" (instrumental)	1:25
4.	"Return to Mudhill" (instrumental)	4:46
5.	"Waiting Room"	4:38
6.	"Miss Gooberville"	0:33
7.	"Mystique of the Beauty Queen"	7:02
8.	"Love Revisited" (instrumental)	2:50
9.	"Ask Someone Who Knows" (instrumental)	7:54
10.	"Now"	6:13
11.	"The Reason of Constructing and/or Building a Pyramid" (instrumental)	9:32
Total length:		55:36

== Personnel ==
Production and performance credits are adapted from the album liner notes.

Beardfish

- Rikard Sjöblom – lead vocals, left speaker guitar, organ, keys, synthesizers, percussives
- David Zackrisson – right speaker guitar, synthesizers, vocals, live sfx
- Robert Hansen – bass, guitar, vocals
- Magnus Östgren – drums

Special guests

- Rasmus Diamant – flute in “Sun is the Devil”
- Christer Jäderlung – vocals in “The Reason of Constructing and/or Building a Pyramid”
- Lisa Marklund – vocals in “The Reason of Constructing and/or Building a Pyramid”

Production

- William Blackmon - engineering and mixing
- Rikard Sjöblom - engineering and mixing
- Robert Hansen - mixing
- Björn Arnell - engineering
- C. Romanikov - mastering
- David Zackrisson - layout
- Hanna Lindqvist - fishdrawing
