= Grimspound (album) =

Studio album by Big Big Train
- Released: 28 April 2017
- Studio: English Electric Studios, Aubitt Studios, Real World Studios, Sweetwater Studios, Ashwood Studios
- Genre: Progressive rock
- Length: 67:52
- Label: English Electric, Giant Electric Pea
- Producer: Big Big Train

Big Big Train chronology
Folklore (2016)	Grimspound (2017)	The Second Brightest Star (2017)

Grimspound is the tenth studio album by the English progressive rock band Big Big Train. Released on 28 April 2017, it was recorded at English Electric Studios, produced by Big Big Train, and mixed and mastered at Aubitt Studios by Rob Aubrey.

Following the release of their previous album, Folklore, the band had planned to release an EP called Skylon that would contain a handful of songs not completed in time to be included on that album. During the recording sessions to finish off the songs the band realised that they had enough material for a full album, deciding to release it as Grimspound. Grimspound is intended to be a companion release to Folklore and features a guest appearance from former Fairport Convention singer Judy Dyble. Upon release it entered the UK music charts at position 45, the band's first time placing in the official charts.

== Track listing ==
Grimspound
No.	Title	Lyrics	Music	Length
1.	"Brave Captain: "Captain Albert Ball cradled in the arms of Mademoiselle Lieppe-Coulon, May 7th 1917" (instrumental); "Memorial to Captain Albert Ball, Nottingham Castle grounds 1973"; "The Great Game"; "Annoeullin (The Present Day)"	David Longdon	Longdon	12:37
2.	"On the Racing Line" (instrumental)		Danny Manners, Greg Spawton	5:12
3.	"Experimental Gentlemen: "Reflectors of Light"; "Merchants of Light"; "The Wonder of it All" (instrumental)"	Spawton	Spawton	10:01
4.	"Meadowland"	Spawton	Rikard Sjöblom, Longdon	3:37
5.	"Grimspound"	Longdon	Spawton	6:56
6.	"The Ivy Gate"	Longdon	Longdon	7:27
7.	"A Mead Hall in Winter"	Spawton	Sjöblom, Longdon	15:20
8.	"As the Crow Flies"	Spawton	Spawton	6:44

== Charts ==
Chart (2017)	Peak position
Scottish Albums (OCC)	41
UK Albums (OCC)	45
UK Independent Albums (OCC)	6
UK Progressive Albums (OCC)	8
UK Rock & Metal Albums (OCC)	1

== Personnel ==
Big Big Train

- Nick D'Virgilio – drums, percussion, backing vocals, co-lead vocals on "A Mead Hall in Winter"
- Dave Gregory – electric guitars
- Rachel Hall – violin, viola, cello, backing vocals, co-lead vocals on "As the Crow Flies"
- David Longdon – lead and backing vocals, flute, piano, electric guitars, mandolin, banjo, lute, celesta, synthesisers, percussion
- Danny Manners – keyboards, double bass
- Andy Poole – acoustic guitar, keyboards, backing vocals
- Rikard Sjöblom – electric guitars, backing vocals, keyboards on "The Ivy Gate"
- Greg Spawton – bass guitar, bass pedals

Additional musicians

- Judy Dyble – vocals (on "The Ivy Gate")
- Philip Trzebiatowski – cello (on "On the Racing Line")

Production

- Rob Aubrey – mixing, mastering
- Rachel Hall – string arrangements
