= Wassail (EP) =

EP by Big Big Train
- Released: 1 June 2015
- Studio: English Electric Studios
- Genre: Progressive rock, new prog
- Length: 25:16
- Label: English Electric
- Producer: David Longdon and Andy Poole

Big Big Train chronology
English Electric: Full Power (2013)	Wassail (2015)	Folklore (2016)

Wassail is the third official studio EP by the English progressive rock band Big Big Train. It was released on 1 June 2015 by English Electric Recordings and Burning Shed. It contains three new songs and a live bonus track that originally appeared on The Underfall Yard. The title track also appears on the band's next full-length studio album, Folklore, released the following year, while the other two new songs are included only on the double-LP vinyl release of that album.

== Track listing ==
1. "Wassail" (Longdon) - 6:48
2. "Lost Rivers of London" (Spawton) - 6:02
3. "Mudlarks" (Spawton) - 6:13
4. "Master James of St George (Live at Real World)" (Spawton) - 6:14

== Personnel ==
- Nick D'Virgilio – drums, backing vocals
- Dave Gregory – 6 and 12 string electric guitars
- Rachel Hall – violin, viola, cello, backing vocals
- David Longdon – lead vocals, flute, mandolin, percussion
- Danny Manners - keyboards, backing vocals
- Andy Poole – keyboards, mandolin, backing vocals
- Rikard Sjöblom – 6 and 12 string electric guitars, backing vocals
- Gregory Spawton – bass, bass pedals
- String arrangements – Rachel Hall on Wassail; Rachel Hall and Danny Manners on Lost Rivers of London
- Mixed and mastered by Rob Aubrey at Aubitt Studios
