= Big Big Train =

English progressive rock band

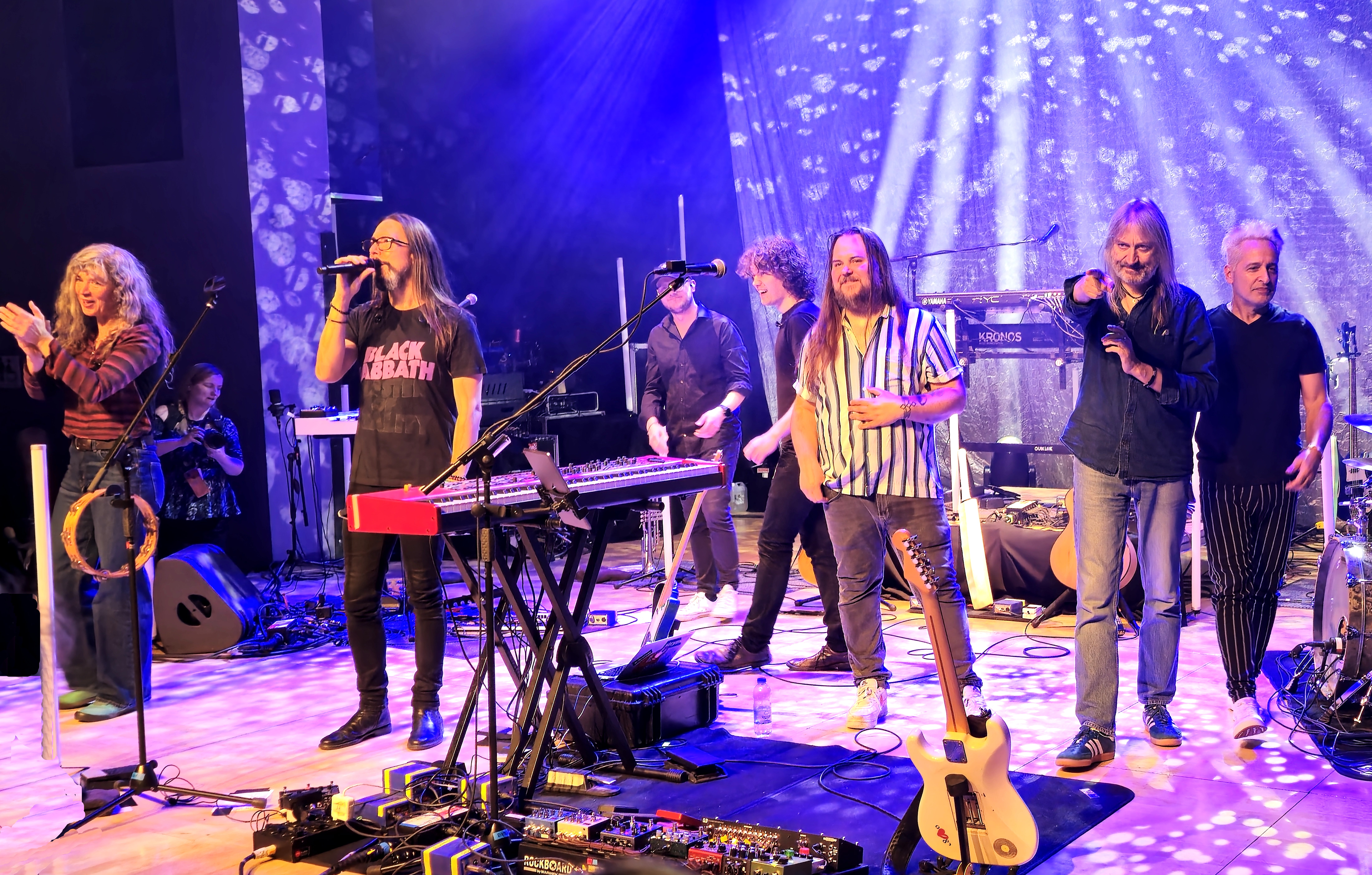
- Big Big Train in 2024. Left to right: Claire Lindley, Alberto Bravin, Paul Mitchell, Oskar Holldorff, Rikard Sjöblom, Gregory Spawton and Nick D'Virgilio.

Background information
- Origin: Bournemouth, Dorset, England
- Genres: Progressive rock, post-rock, new prog
- Years active: 1990–present
- Labels: English Electric, Giant Electric Pea, Inside Out Music
- Members: Gregory Spawton; Nick D'Virgilio; Rikard Sjöblom; Clare Lindley; Alberto Bravin; Oskar Holldorff; Paul Mitchell
- Past members: Andy Poole; Ian Cooper; Steve Hughes; Martin Read; Tony Müller; Pete Hibbit; Phil Hogg; Sean Filkins; David Longdon; Dave Gregory; Danny Manners; Rachel Hall; Dave Foster; Carly Bryant
- Website: bigbigtrain.com

Big Big Train are an international progressive rock band, initially formed in Bournemouth in 1990. The current line-up includes band founder Gregory Spawton (bass, guitars and keyboards), along with Nick D'Virgilio (drums, vocals, guitars and keyboards), Rikard Sjöblom (guitars and keyboards), Clare Lindley (violin, keyboards, guitars and vocals), Alberto Bravin (vocals, guitars, keyboards and drums), Oskar Holldorff (keyboards and vocals) and Paul Mitchell (trumpet, percussion). Until 2009, the band were active as a predominantly studio project led by Spawton and co-founder Andy Poole (bass, keyboards and guitars), who departed the band in 2018, with changing line-ups and guest musicians. They have released sixteen studio albums and six EPs.

After starting out as an independent band, Big Big Train were signed to Giant Electric Pea from 1993 to 1998 and distributed their releases through their own website. After their sixth album, The Underfall Yard, which received critical acclaim from the progressive rock community, a more stable line-up was established, and the band performed their first live concerts in 17 years at Kings Place, London, in August 2015. The gigs were voted Event of the Year by the readers of Prog magazine. Stone & Steel, a Blu-ray featuring the 2014 rehearsals at Real World Studios and four of the songs performed at Kings Place, was released on 21 March 2016. Big Big Train were the winners of the Breakthrough Award at the Progressive Music Awards held at Kew Gardens, London on 3 September 2013, and have been nominated in several other categories in recent years.

The band's latest studio album, Woodcut, was released in February 2026, as a follow-up to The Likes Of Us, released in March 2024. Their previous studio album, Welcome to the Planet, was released in January 2022. Ingenious Devices, a compilation album of re-recorded material with David Longdon's original vocals and one live track with their new singer Alberto Bravin, was released on 30 June 2023.

Big Big Train embarked on their first UK tour in October 2019. Scheduled dates for the band's first ever North American and European tours in 2020 were cancelled due to the coronavirus pandemic. Following a European and UK tour in autumn 2023, their first US tour finally took place in March 2024, and included two appearances at Cruise to the Edge. The band then embarked on a limited tour of the UK and Europe in late September/early October 2024, predominantly featuring tracks from their album, The Likes Of Us.

== History ==
=== Early history ===
The roots of Big Big Train go back to 1981 in Sutton Coldfield near Birmingham in England, when Gregory's older brother Nigel Spawton (drums) joined with Ed Serafinas (vocals), Pete McDonald (bass), Steve Lugg (guitar/vocals) and Tim McCarty (guitar/vocals) in the new wave outfit known as Big Big Train. Together they wrote and recorded many memorable tracks including ‘Snowbound Children’, ‘Girl in a Liver Swap’ and ‘Bandits at 12 o’clock’. Later in the 80s Andy Poole formed a songwriting partnership in Bournemouth, England, with his childhood friend, Ian Cooper. At around the same time, Gregory Spawton had also formed his first band, Equus. Equus played a few local gigs around the Birmingham area before splitting up when Spawton went to university in 1984. Meanwhile, Poole and Cooper's band, Archshine, recorded a few demos and occasionally emerged from their home studio to play some gigs.

In 1987, Spawton moved down to Bournemouth. Shortly afterwards, he met Poole and they discovered that they shared a mutual appreciation of Genesis, Van der Graaf Generator and other progressive bands. In particular, they were both fans of a then relatively obscure band called IQ. Indeed, Poole had spent some time as a roadie for The Lens and IQ.

In the late 1980s, they decided to record some demos together. After a few months, the very first Big Big Train songs emerged and in 1990, Archshine ceased to exist, and Big Big Train was founded, initially consisting of the duo of Spawton (guitar) and Poole (bass). The following year saw the recruitment of Cooper (keyboards), Steve Hughes (drums), and Martin Read (vocals).

The band's earliest songs were released on a demo tape in October 1991, and the band's first demo album, From the River to the Sea, was released in May 1992. During this time, the band continued to perform live dates, gradually playing to larger crowds in higher profile venues.

=== 1993–2003 ===
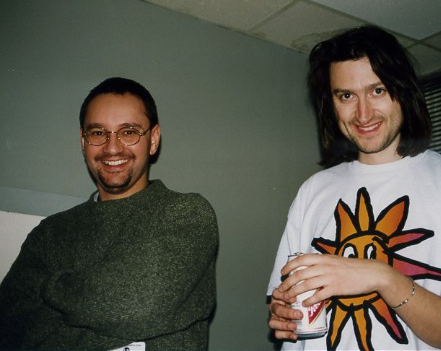
Band founders Andy Poole (left) and Gregory Spawton in 1996

In January 1993 the band released their second demo album, The Infant Hercules. The name is likely a reference to the quote by William Gladstone—"This remarkable place, the youngest child of England's enterprise, is an infant, but if an infant, an infant Hercules"—the words used to describe the English town Middlesbrough. The song "Kingmaker" was the first track the band played at their first concert. The demo was followed up six months later with their debut full-length album, Goodbye to the Age of Steam. The full-length album was recorded over the course of two weeks in July 1993. Not long after the recording sessions were completed, the band were signed to the progressive rock label Giant Electric Pea.

The response to the album was very positive, culminating in a licensing deal in Japan where the CD was re-released in 1995, with a bonus track. In the meantime, Ian Cooper had left the band (for family reasons) and due to this the band ceased touring and started looking for his replacement. In the meantime, they started work on their next album, with Spawton filling the role of keyboard player. Eventually, Tony Müller was recruited as keyboard player in early 1995 during the recording of the new album.

Some of the new songs were debuted live at The Astoria, London, the only live show the band performed during this period. English Boy Wonders was finally released in autumn 1997, although to a much less positive reaction than Age of Steam. At this stage, after a less than pleasurable recording experience, a poorly received second album, and with a record label which had stopped returning calls, it appeared that the band had run its course.

Steve Hughes left the band in September 1998 and went on to join The Enid. He was replaced, briefly, by Pete Hibbit. After a few more live performances, the band's momentum was all but spent and Spawton and Poole retreated back to their studio to work on the next album. Events had turned full circle; Poole and Spawton, with no particular goal in mind and without a band line-up, slowly began work on some demos, more out of habit than anything else.

As the demos took shape, Gregory and Andy called in the other band members as and when they were required. In February 2002, after three years of irregular writing and recording, Bard was released. Bard received some excellent reviews. The line-up of the band during the recording of Bard consisted of Spawton, Poole, Read, Müller, the returning Cooper, and drummer Phil Hogg. Around the time of the album's release, The Enid became inactive, and Steve Hughes returned to Big Big Train to replace the departing Hogg.

=== 2004–2008 ===
In 2003, Müller and Read departed the band, and Sean Filkins was recruited to replace Read. This line-up recorded the band's next album, Gathering Speed, which was released in March 2004. This was the last album to feature Ian Cooper on keyboards; Poole and Spawton took the keyboards to play in future albums.

A new album titled The Difference Machine was released in September 2007. The album featured guest appearances from future full-time member Nick D'Virgilio, and Dave Meros (both of Spock's Beard), as well as Pete Trewavas of Marillion. In 2008, BBT appeared on the Classic Rock Magazine CD for issue 112, with the song Summer's Lease, which is also found on The Difference Machine.

On BBT's blog, it was announced that they would be re-releasing English Boy Wonders. They partially re-recorded the album, as well as re-mixing it. English Boy Wonders was re-released on 1 December 2008.

=== 2009–2010 ===
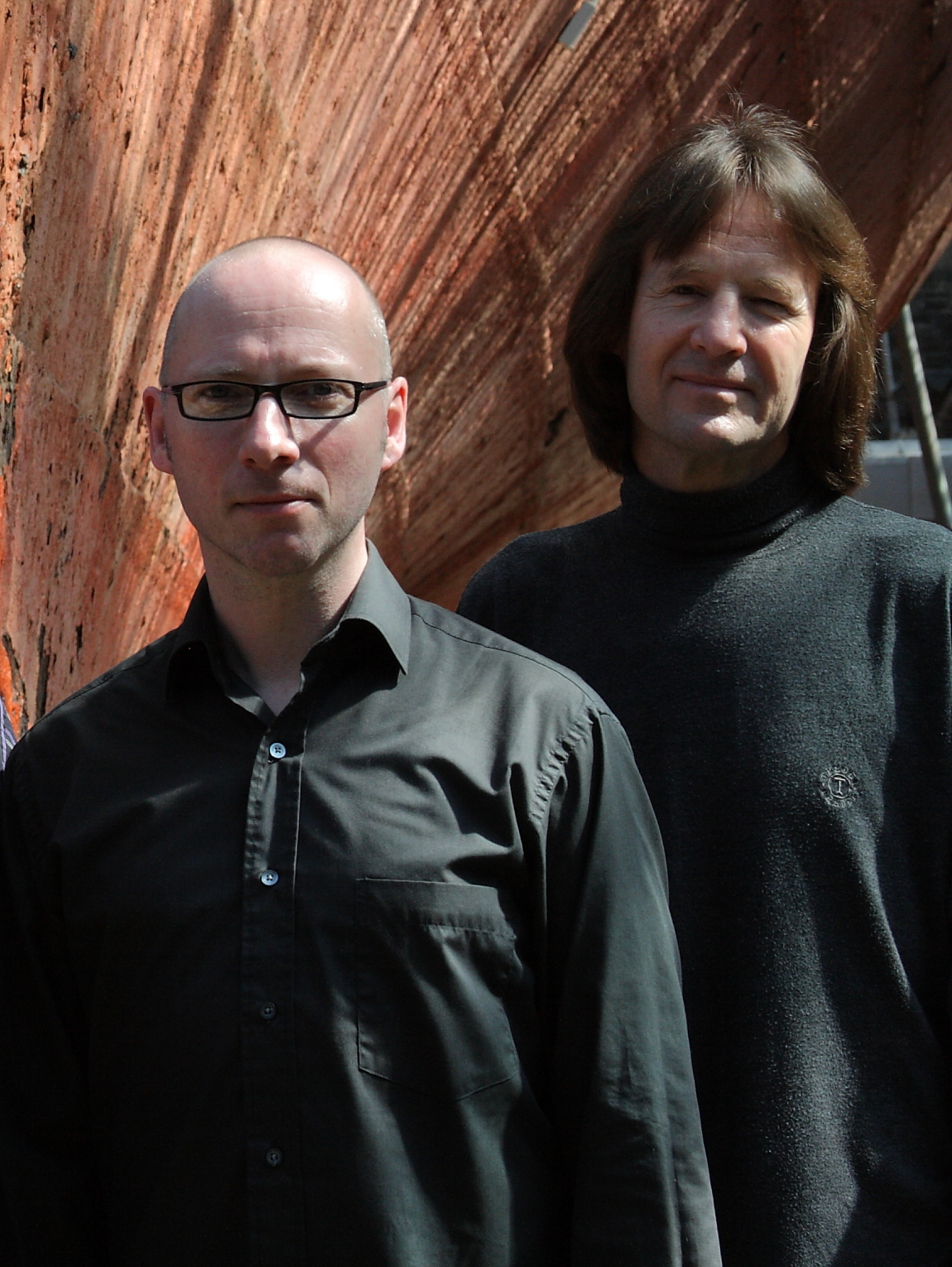
David Longdon and Dave Gregory both joined the band in 2009 and continued until 2021 and 2020 respectively.

Both Hughes and Filkins left the band in February 2009, and were replaced by then-Spock's Beard drummer and regular collaborator Nick D'Virgilio and vocalist and flute player David Longdon respectively.

BBT released their sixth studio album, The Underfall Yard, on 15 December 2009. Guitarist Dave Gregory (XTC), keyboardist Jem Godfrey (Frost*) and guitarist Francis Dunnery (It Bites) make guest appearances on The Underfall Yard. "Last Train" from The Underfall Yard was released on the iTunes essential compilation album Modern Prog on 10 February 2010.

The Underfall Yard received significant critical acclaim and the 23-minute title track was featured as Classic Rock's Track of the Day.

Gathering Speed was re-issued in December 2009, in a re-mastered digipack version. The Difference Machine was re-issued in January 2010 with a bonus track from the original sessions.

In October 2010, the band released the 41-minute EP entitled Far Skies Deep Time containing five tracks including a cover version of Anthony Phillips' "Master of Time". The EP also includes the 17-minute track "The Wide Open Sea" – a story about the Belgian singer songwriter Jacques Brel which inspired the cover artwork by Jim Trainer. The EP again features guitarist Dave Gregory (formerly of XTC and now an established part of the band's line-up) as well as featuring performances from guest musicians keyboardist Martin Orford and bassist Danny Manners (frequent collaborator with Louis Philippe).

=== 2011–2021 ===
The band's first album, Goodbye to the Age of Steam, was remixed from the original 2-inch, 24-track master tapes from January to July 2010 by Rob Aubrey and Andy Poole. No new parts were added, although some keyboard sounds were replaced. The original artwork was also replaced with new images by Jim Trainer inspired by the lyrical themes of the album, which was released in April 2011 in a digipack format. The album includes three additional tracks. "Far Distant Thing" was recorded in 1992 with Rob Aubrey for a local radio station. "Expecting Dragons" is a new arrangement and recording of themes from both Dragon Bone Hill and Expecting Snow. "Losing Your Way" incorporates an instrumental section excluded from the original album version of the track.

The band created a new arrangement for "Kingmaker", which they performed and recorded in June 2011. "Kingmaker" originally appeared on their 1992 demo album, The Infant Hercules. The new recording features the current line-up and replaced "Master of Time" on the Russian release of Far Skies Deep Time in a mini vinyl album format.

On 3 September 2012, the band released their seventh studio album, the first part of a double album, entitled English Electric Part One. The second part, English Electric Part Two, was released in March 2013, and featured Danny Manners (keyboards, double bass), who was now an official member of the band.

Big Big Train were the winners of the Breakthrough act award at the 2013 Progressive Music Awards.

On 23 September 2013, Big Big Train released English Electric: Full Power (EEFLP). This is a two-CD version of English Electric including all of the tracks from English Electric Part One and Part Two and four new tracks. Alongside EEFLP, the band released the Make Some Noise EP including the new tracks as a separate release.

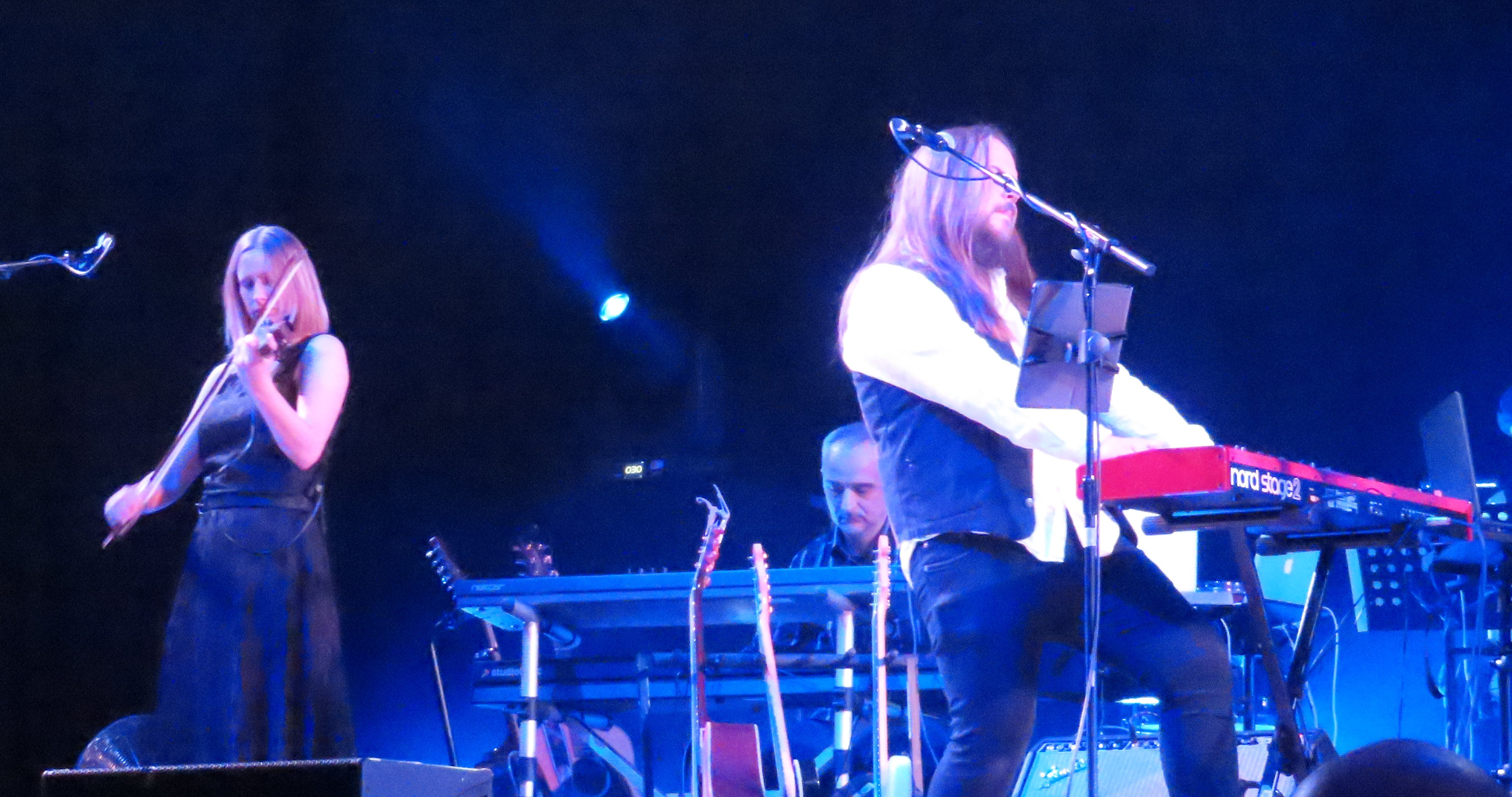
Rachel Hall (left) and Rikard Sjöblom (far right) joined as touring members in 2014 and later joined the band for studio work. Robin Armstrong is seen in the rear on keyboards

At the start of 2014 Beardfish frontman Rikard Sjöblom was confirmed as a touring keyboardist and guitarist. In August, the band convened at Real World Studios for a week to try out a live line-up that also included violinist Rachel Hall and a five-piece brass band under the directorship of trombonist Dave Desmond, who had featured on recent Big Big Train albums. The positive outcome led to the band announcing that its first live performances in seventeen years would take place in August 2015 at Kings Place in London, and that Sjöblom and Hall were now full band members for both live and studio work. Three dates were announced, selling out within days, and the gigs were voted Event of the Year by the readers of Prog magazine.

An EP containing new and live tracks, Wassail, was released on 1 June 2015, and Stone & Steel, a Blu-ray featuring rehearsals at Real World Studios as well as four of the songs performed at the Kings Place concerts, was released on 21 March 2016. The digital-only album From Stone and Steel, containing the Real World studio performances from August 2014, was released on 1 April 2016. Folklore was released on 27 May 2016 whilst its 'companion' album Grimspound was released on 28 April 2017. The video for 'As The Crow Flies' from Grimspound made its debut on YouTube on 31 March 2017. The video for "Experimental Gentlemen" from Grimspound made its debut on YouTube on 21 April 2017. The Second Brightest Star was released on 23 June 2017 as a companion album to Folklore and Grimspound, including 40 minutes of new tracks that "explore landscapes, rivers and meeting places and take the listener on voyages of discovery across the world and to the stars" in addition to 30 minutes of extended material from Folklore and Grimspound.

Big Big Train headlined The Night of the Prog festival in Lorelei, Germany, on 13 July 2018. A UK warm-up gig was played on 11 July 2018 at The Basingstoke Anvil. Previously, they played at Cadogan Hall, London, in September/October 2017.

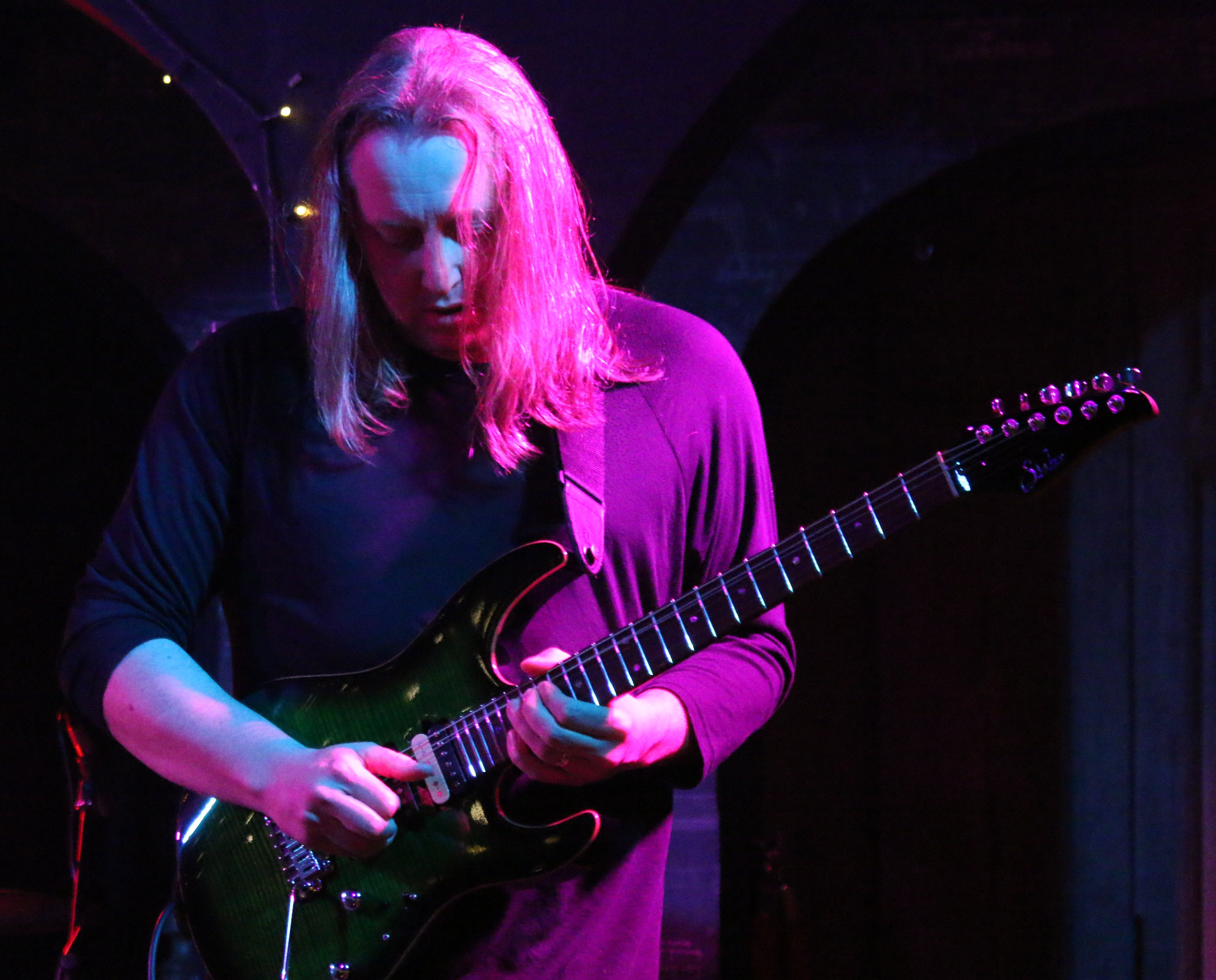
Dave Foster replaced Dave Gregory as lead guitarist in 2020.

Band co-founder Andy Poole departed the band early in January 2018, with Robin Armstrong, leader of Cosmograf, joining the live line-up of the band the following month on keyboards and guitars. Armstrong left the line-up at the end of 2019. Dave Gregory would announce his departure in March 2020 due to his desire to not tour internationally with Big Big Train. Randy McStine was subsequently named as his live replacement for scheduled shows in 2020, which were all subsequently cancelled due to the COVID-19 pandemic. Later in 2020, it was announced that Carly Bryant and Dave Foster would join the BBT live band.

On 27 November 2020, BBT released a live album entitled Empire, recorded at a concert at the Hackney Empire, London, 2 November 2019.

Their thirteenth album, Common Ground, was released on 30 July 2021.

On 21 October 2021, the band announced that their fourteenth studio album, Welcome to the Planet, would be released on 28 January 2022. Preceding the announcement of the album, the band released the singles "The Connection Plan", "Lanterna", and "Made From Sunshine" as part of their Stay Tuned streaming series on 24 August 2021, 21 September 2021, and 19 October 2021 respectively.

Lead vocalist David Longdon died on 20 November 2021, aged 56.

=== 2022–present ===
On 27 April 2022, Big Big Train announced former Premiata Forneria Marconi singer and keyboard player, Alberto Bravin, as their new lead vocalist. On 15 January 2023, it was announced that Carly Bryant was departing Big Big Train, to be replaced by Dim Gray's Oskar Holldorff. In December 2023, the band announced their first studio album of new material with Alberto Bravin, The Likes Of Us, which was released in March 2024. In the same month they also announced their first US tour dates, also for March 2024. In late September/early October 2024 the band embarked on a limited tour of the UK and Europe.

Big Big Train released their first full concept album titled Woodcut on Feb 7th, 2026. The album was produced and largely arranged by singer Alberto Bravin, and also saw writing contributions from Clare Lindley, who penned the lyrics for the single "The Sharpest Blade." The album also has vocal contributions from each member of the band.. While on tour in Oslo, Greg Spawton and Alberto Bravin visited the Munch Museum, where a display of woodcuts sparked an unexpected moment of inspiration. Struck by both the term “woodcut” and the artistic concept of carving negatives to create a final image, they immediately saw its potential as an album title and story and it became the starting point for a full concept album.

== Band members ==
=== Current ===
- Gregory Spawton – bass guitar, backing vocals, guitars, keyboards (1990–present)
- Nick D'Virgilio – drums, vocals, percussion, guitars, keyboards (2009–present)
- Rikard Sjöblom – guitars, keyboards, backing vocals (2014–present)
- Clare Lindley – violin, guitar, vocals, keyboards (2021–present)
- Alberto Bravin – lead vocals, guitar, keyboards, drums (2022–present)
- Oskar Holldorff – keyboards, vocals (2023–present; touring 2022–2023)
- Paul Mitchell – trumpet, keyboards, tin whistle, percussion, backing vocals (2025–present; touring 2024–2025)

== Discography ==
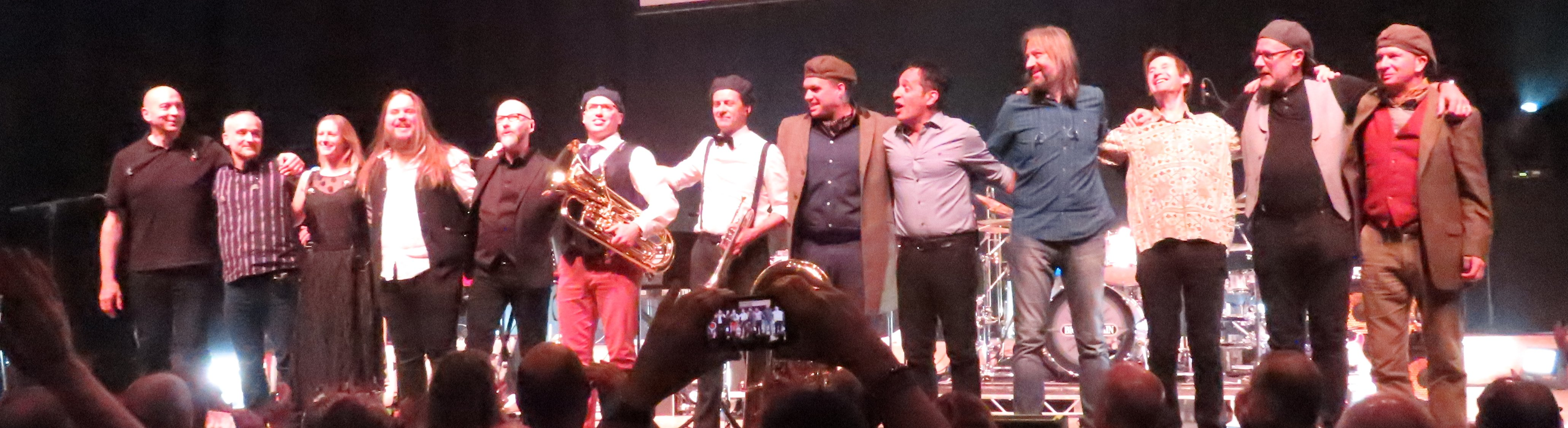
Touring line-up in 2019.

Studio Albums

- Goodbye to the Age of Steam (1994)
- English Boy Wonders (1997)
- Bard (2002)
- Gathering Speed (2004)
- The Difference Machine (2007)
- The Underfall Yard (2009)
- English Electric Part One (2012)
- English Electric Part Two (2013)
- Folklore (2016)
- Grimspound (2017)
- The Second Brightest Star (2017)
- Grand Tour (2019)
- Common Ground (2021)
- Welcome to the Planet (2022)
- The Likes of Us (2024)
- Woodcut (2026)

Compilation Albums

- English Electric: Full Power (2013)
- Summer's Lease (2020)
- Ingenious Devices (2023)
