= The Second Brightest Star =

Studio album by Big Big Train
- Released: 23 June 2017
- Studio: English Electric Studios, Aubitt Studios, Real World Studios, Sweetwater Studios, Ashwood Studios
- Genre: Progressive rock
- Length: 70:28
- Label: English Electric
- Producer: Big Big Train

Big Big Train chronology
Grimspound (2017)	The Second Brightest Star (2017)	Grand Tour (2019)

The Second Brightest Star is the eleventh studio album by the English progressive rock band Big Big Train. It contains a mix of new songs along with re-worked material from the band's previous two albums, Folklore and Grimspound. It is the band's last album to feature co-founder Andy Poole who departed the band in January 2018.

== Track listing ==
The Second Brightest Star
No.	Title	Lyrics	Music	Length
1.	"The Second Brightest Star"	David Longdon	Longdon	7:17
2.	"Haymaking" (instrumental)		Rachel Hall	3:24
3.	"Skylon"	Longdon, Greg Spawton, Rikard Sjöblom	Longdon, Spawton, Sjöblom	6:44
4.	"London Stone" (instrumental)		Sjöblom, Danny Manners	2:00
5.	"The Passing Widow"	Hall	Hall	5:33
6.	"The Leaden Stour"	Spawton	Spawton	7:19
7.	"Terra Australis Incognita" (instrumental)		Spawton, Manners	4:19
8.	"Brooklands sequence": "On the Racing Line"; "Brooklands"	Spawton	Spawton, Manners	17:33
9.	"London Plane sequence": "Turner on the Thames"; "London Plane"	Spawton	Spawton	13:17
10.	"The Gentlemen's Reprise" (instrumental)		Spawton	3:02
Total length:				70:28

== Personnel ==
Big Big Train

- Nick D'Virgilio – drums, percussion, backing vocals
- Dave Gregory – electric guitars
- Rachel Hall – violin, viola, cello, backing vocals
- David Longdon – lead vocals, flute, piano, electric guitars, mandolin, banjo, lute, celesta, synthesisers, percussion
- Danny Manners – keyboards, double bass
- Andy Poole – acoustic guitar, keyboards, backing vocals
- Rikard Sjöblom – electric guitars, backing vocals, keyboards on "The Second Brightest Star"
- Greg Spawton – bass guitar, bass pedals

Production

- Rob Aubrey – mixing, mastering
- Rachel Hall – string arrangements
