= Beardfish (band) =

Swedish progressive rock band

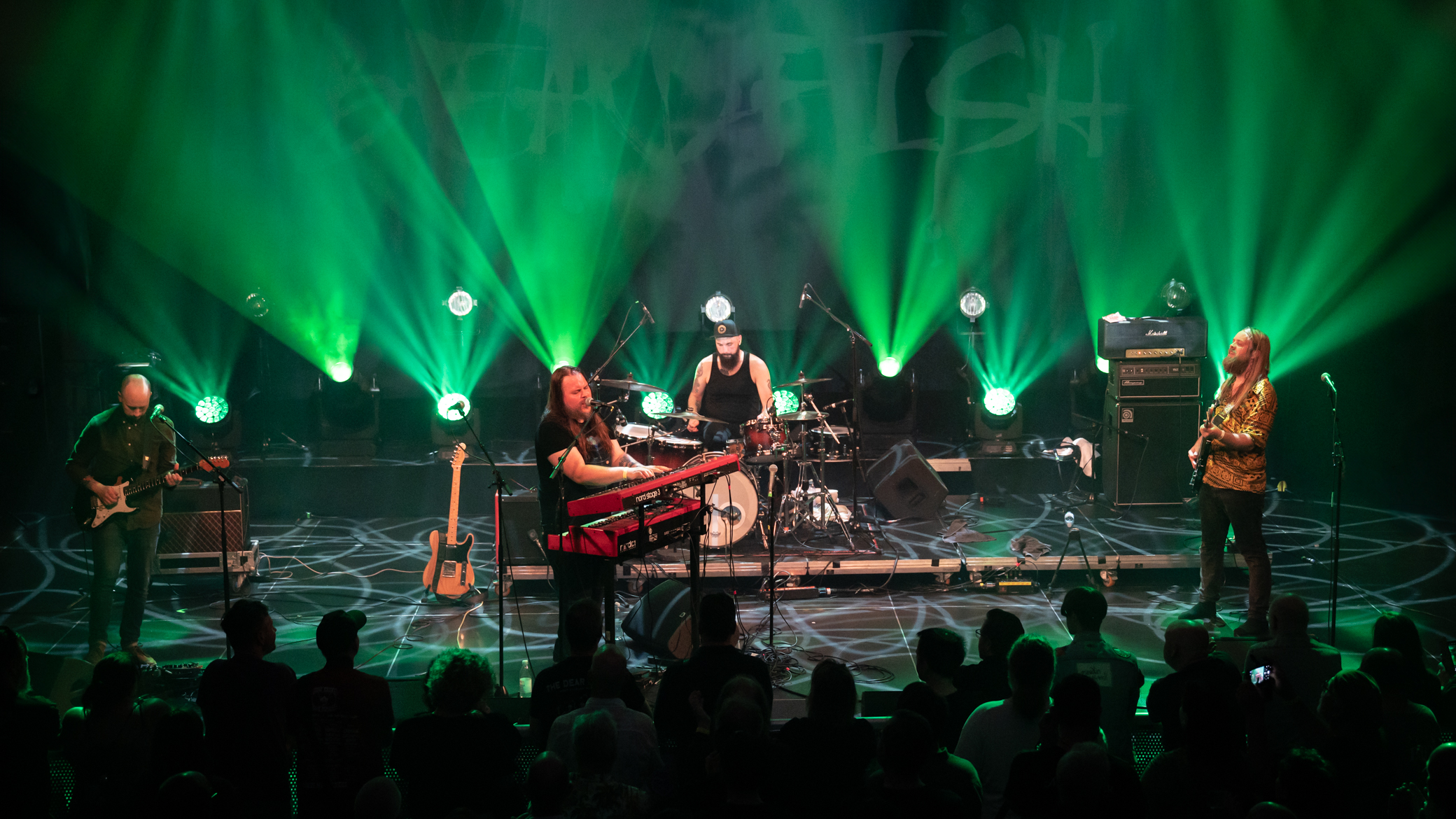
- Beardfish performing at We Låve Rock 2024

Background information
- Origin: Sweden
- Genres: Progressive rock, progressive metal
- Years active: 2001–2016, 2023–present
- Label: InsideOut Music
- Members: Rikard Sjöblom; David Zackrisson; Magnus Östgren; Robert Hansen
- Past members: Gabriel Olsson; Petter Diamant; Stefan Aronsson
- Website: beardfishband.com

Beardfish are a Swedish progressive rock band formed in 2001. Their style resembles progressive rock bands from the 1970s, such as King Crimson and Gentle Giant. The band's most prolific line-up consisted of founding members vocalist/keyboardist/guitarist Rikard Sjöblom and guitarist David Zackrisson, along with longtime drummer Magnus Östgren and bassist Robert Hansen; who joined the band in 2001 and 2002 respectively; this is the band's current line-up since 2003 (following the departure of keyboardist/guitarist Stefan Aronsson), including the band's reunion in 2023 after its 2016 hiatus.

== History ==
The initial lineup of Beardfish consisted of frontman Rikard Sjöblom, guitarist David Zackrisson, bassist Gabriel Olsson, and drummer Petter Diamant. Before the end of 2001, Diamant had been replaced by Magnus Östgren, and early in 2002 the band's lineup was augmented by keyboardist Stefan Aronsson. Later that year, Olsson was replaced by Robert Hansen, and it was this lineup that recorded the band's debut album, Från En Plats Du Ej Kan Se, in 2003. Following the release of the album, Aronsson left the band, leaving Beardfish with the four-man lineup which existed for the rest of the duration of the band's existence.

Following the release of the band's second album, The Sane Day, in 2006, the band were signed by InsideOut Music, and also performed their first concert in the US at the legendary Progday festival in North Carolina. Beardfish have remained on InsideOut ever since, releasing six more albums to date, the latest of which was 2015's +4626-COMFORTZONE.

In 2008, Beardfish toured with fellow progressive rock band The Tangent. The following year they were scheduled to tour North America during the summer as part of Progressive Nation, a tour organized by Dream Theater drummer Mike Portnoy; however, they were forced to withdraw from this event after InsideOut lost funding because its distributor, SPV, declared bankruptcy.

In September 2012, Beardfish were the opening act for all European dates of the band Flying Colors, and in May 2013, were one of the opening acts (along with Sound of Contact) for all European dates of the band Spock's Beard. The band followed this up by touring with Sound of Contact in support of Spock's Beard during 2013. In 2014 the band commenced work on their eighth studio album, with Sjöblom also joining the band Big Big Train in the capacity of touring guitarist. In October it was announced that Sjöblom would remain with Big Big Train in an official capacity. The following month Beardfish announced the completion of their eighth studio album, entitled *+4626-COMFORTZONE (+46 is the international telephone country code for Sweden, (0)26 is the area code for Gävle/Sandviken, where the band comes from), scheduled for release in January 2015. For the tour dates commencing in early 2015 the band extended their touring line-up with the addition of keyboardist Martin Borgh.

In July 2016, the band announced they had broken up.

In September 2023, the Asker Culture House of Asker, Norway announced in a Facebook post that Beardfish would be playing on a bill with The Chronicles of Father Robin at the We Låve Rock Festival, taking place in May 2024. This would be the first time the band performed since 2015. At the time, it was unclear whether band had reformed, or if it was simply a reunion show. In November 2023, an official Beardfish account was created on Instagram. On 15 December 2023 it was officially announced by the Sounds Fair organisation that Beardfish were booked to play at the Gefle Skivmässa (a record fair plus live concerts) in their hometown of Gävle, in May 2024. Over the course of the next few months, the band shared roughly a dozen different videos from studio sessions which seemed to suggest a new album was in the works. Over this same period, the band (also via Instagram) also shared the dates of a few other live performances. Finally, in an April 2024 Instagram post, the band confirmed a new album was on the way and that it was, "starting to take shape." 4 May 2024 saw the official reunion gig at the Gefle Skivmässa. Later that month, on 17 May 2024, the band revealed that they had re-signed to InsideOut Music, and announced a reissue and vinyl run of their 2009 album Destined Solitaire for its 15th anniversary. On 30 August 2024, they released their first song since reuniting, entitled "In the Autumn", and announced that their next album, entitled Songs for Beating Hearts, would be released on 1 November 2024 on InsideOut Music. The single features guest vocalist Amanda Örtenhag, and was accompanied by a music video.

== Members ==
Beardfish at We Låve Rock 2024

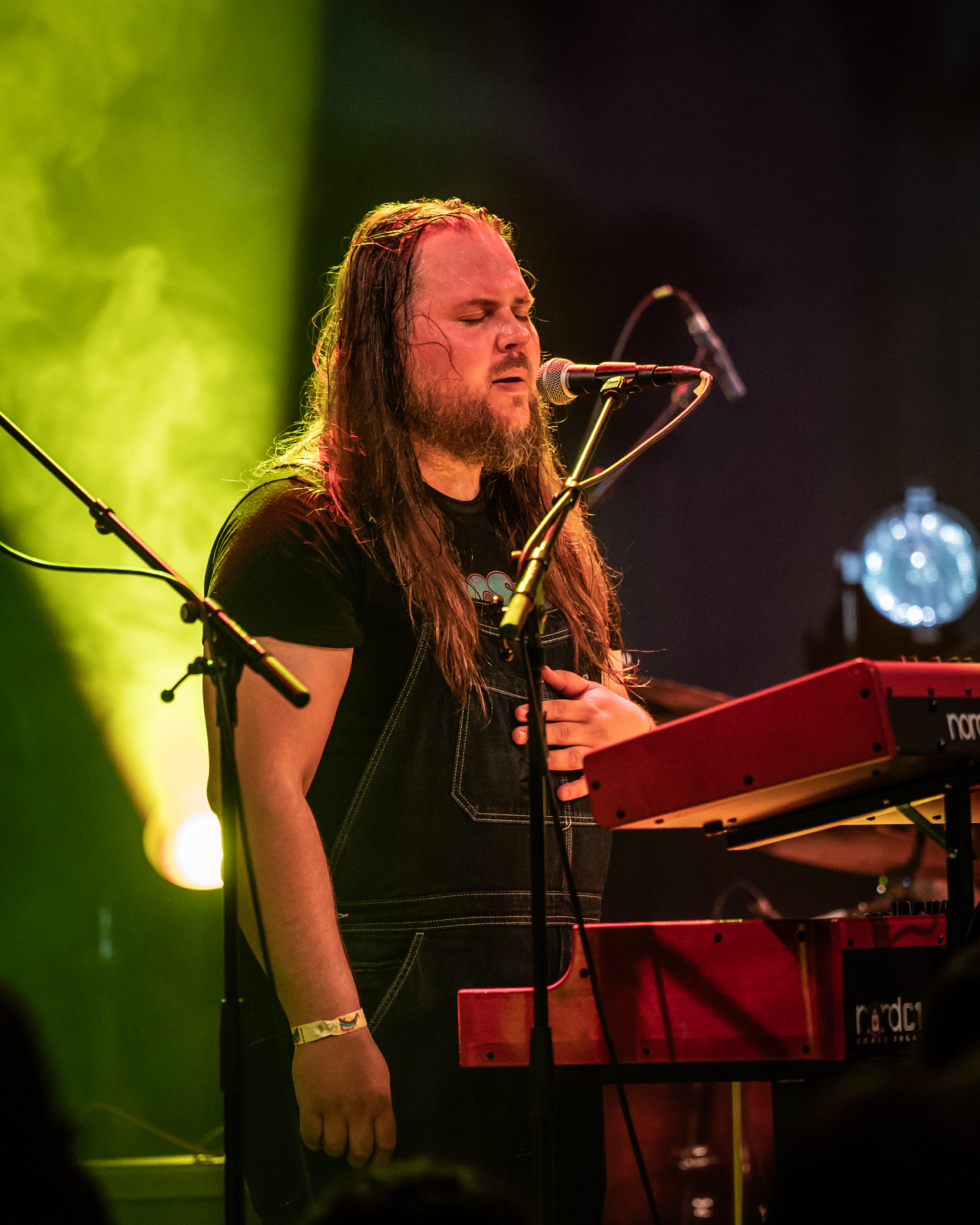
Sjöblom

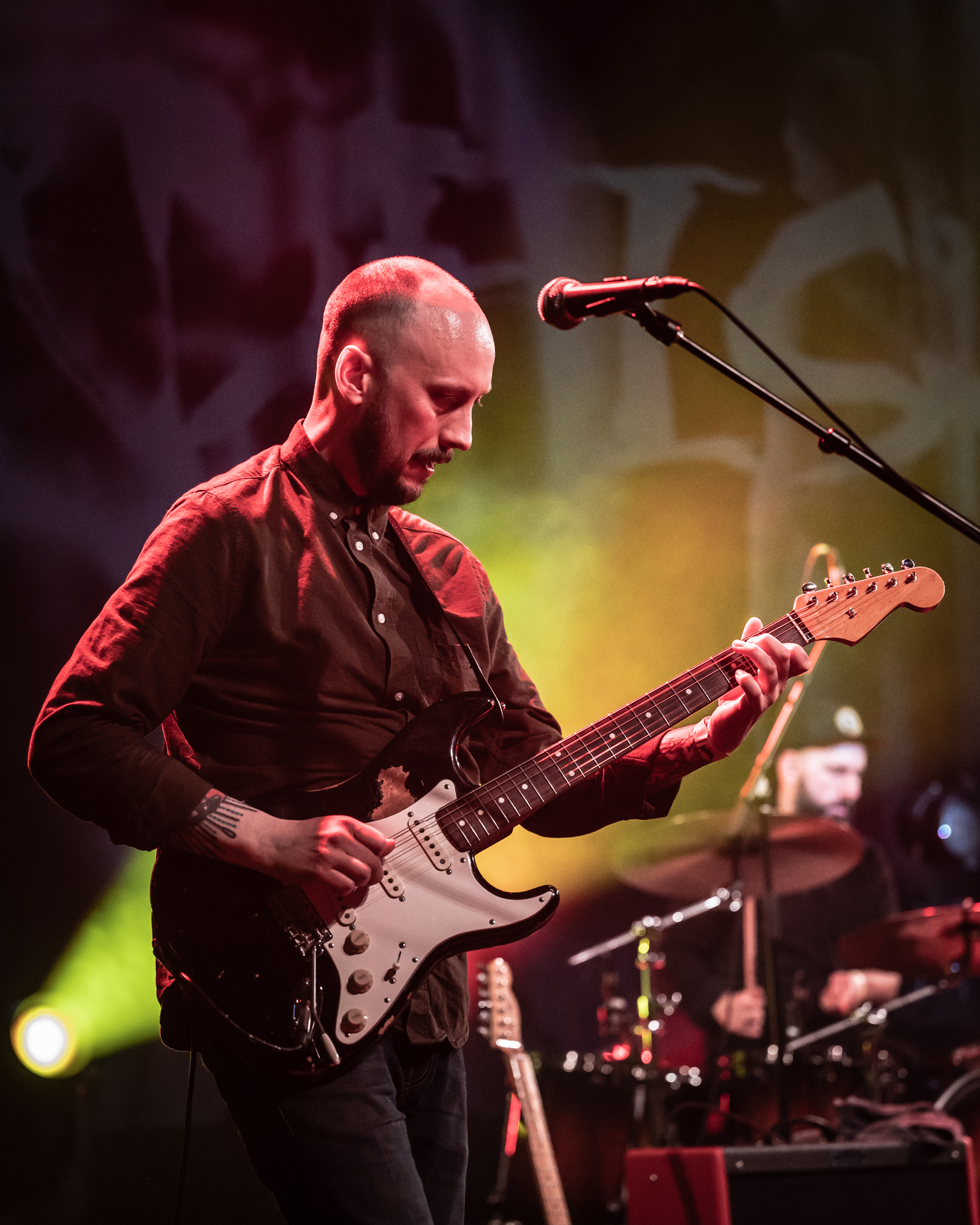
Zackrisson

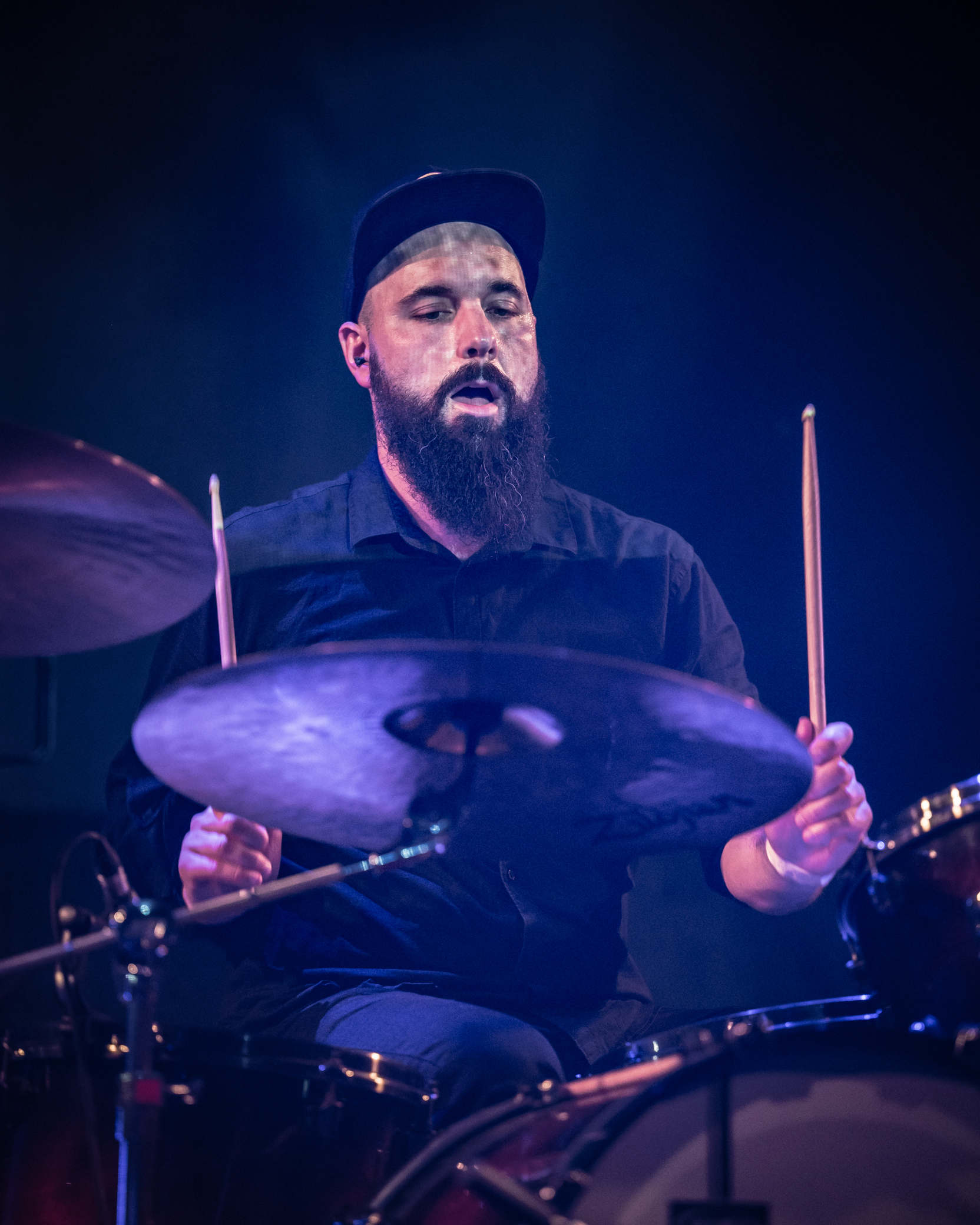
Östgren

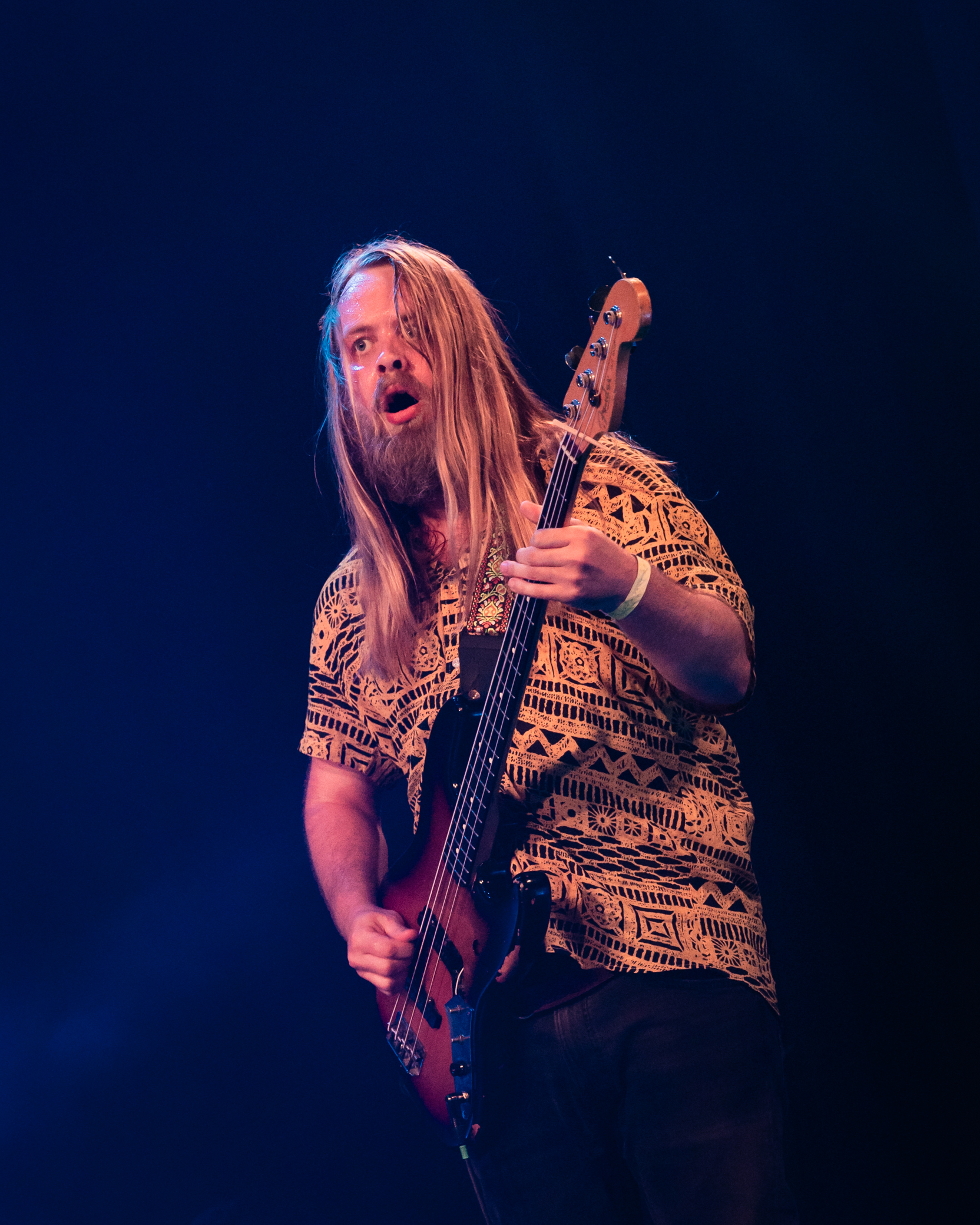
Hansen

Current members

- Rikard Sjöblom - lead vocals, keyboards, guitars (2001–2016, 2023–present)
- David Zackrisson - guitars, backing vocals (2001–2016, 2023–present)
- Magnus Östgren - drums (2001–2016, 2023–present)
- Robert Hansen - bass, backing vocals (2002–2016, 2023–present)

Early members

- Gabriel Olsson - bass (2001-2002)
- Petter Diamant - drums (2001)
- Stefan Aronsson - keyboards, guitars, flute (2002-2003)

Touring musicians

- Martin Borgh - keyboards (2015)

=== Lineups ===
2001	2001 – 2002	2002	2002 – 2003	2003 – 2016, 2023 – present
Rikard Sjöblom - vocals, keyboards, guitars; David Zackrisson - guitars; Gabriel Olsson - bass; Petter Diamant - drums	Rikard Sjöblom - vocals, keyboards, guitars; David Zackrisson - guitars; Gabriel Olsson - bass; Magnus Östgren - drums	Rikard Sjöblom - vocals, keyboards, guitars; David Zackrisson - guitars; Gabriel Olsson - bass; Magnus Östgren - drums; Stefan Aronsson - keyboards, guitars, flute	Rikard Sjöblom - vocals, keyboards, guitars; David Zackrisson - guitars; Magnus Östgren - drums; Stefan Aronsson - keyboards, guitars, flute; Robert Hansen - bass	Rikard Sjöblom - vocals, keyboards, guitars; David Zackrisson - guitars; Magnus Östgren - drums; Robert Hansen - bass

== Discography ==
- Från en plats du ej kan se... (2003)
- The Sane Day (2005)
- Sleeping in Traffic: Part One (2007)
- Sleeping in Traffic: Part Two (2008)
- Destined Solitaire (2009)
- Mammoth (2011)
- The Void (2012)
- +4626-COMFORTZONE (2015)
- Songs for Beating Hearts (2024)
