= English Electric: Full Power =

Compilation album by Big Big Train
- Released: 23 September 2013
- Genre: Progressive rock, new prog
- Length: 135:11
- Label: English Electric Recordings
- Producer: Andy Poole

Big Big Train chronology
Make Some Noise (EP) (2013)	English Electric: Full Power (2013)	Wassail (EP) (2015)

English Electric: Full Power (sometimes abbreviated to EEFLP) is a compilation album by the English progressive rock band Big Big Train. It presents tracks from their seventh and eighth studio albums, English Electric Part One and English Electric Part Two, along with four new pieces (which were additionally released on the EP Make Some Noise) as a self-contained double CD album. The album was issued in a book-style digipack, including a 96-page booklet.

EEFLP (along with the Make Some Noise EP) marks the final release of English Electric material, which began work as early as 2010, and was the last release of new material from the band until the EP Wassail in 2015. A new edition of EEFLP with a different cover under the name English Electric was released in 2016.

== Background ==
Each song on the album tells a different story, many of them centering around characters living and working in England, with reference to the country's industrial past and processes which have changed its landscape. Full lyrics as well as descriptions of the stories behind the songs are included in the 96-page booklet of EEFLP. Additionally, Greg Spawton and David Longdon discussed the meanings of the tracks on the two initially released "parts" of English Electric in blogs leading up to the releases of those albums.

== Track listing ==
Disc One
No.	Title	Writer(s)	Original album	Length
1.	"Make Some Noise"	David Longdon	Make Some Noise EP	4:23
2.	"The First Rebreather"	Greg Spawton	English Electric Part One	8:31
3.	"Uncle Jack"	Longdon	English Electric Part One	3:49
4.	"Swan Hunter"	Longdon, Spawton	English Electric Part Two	6:21
5.	"Seen Better Days"	Spawton	Make Some Noise EP	7:37
6.	"Edgelands"	Danny Manners, Spawton	Make Some Noise EP	1:26
7.	"Summoned by Bells"	Spawton	English Electric Part One	9:17
8.	"Upton Heath"	Longdon, Spawton	English Electric Part One	5:39
9.	"A Boy in Darkness"	Longdon	English Electric Part One	8:03
10.	"Hedgerow"	Longdon, Andy Poole, Spawton	English Electric Part One	8:54
Total length:				63:57

Disc Two
No.	Title	Writer(s)	Original album	Length
1.	"Judas Unrepentant"	Longdon	English Electric Part One	7:18
2.	"Worked Out"	Spawton	English Electric Part Two	7:31
3.	"Winchester from St Giles' Hill"	Spawton	English Electric Part One	7:18
4.	"The Lovers"	Longdon	Make Some Noise EP	5:32
5.	"Leopards"	Longdon	English Electric Part Two	3:54
6.	"Keeper of Abbeys"	Spawton	English Electric Part Two	6:59
7.	"The Permanent Way"	Spawton	English Electric Part Two	8:16
8.	"East Coast Racer"	Spawton	English Electric Part Two	15:45
9.	"Curator of Butterflies"	Spawton	English Electric Part Two	8:45
Total length:				71:14

== Personnel ==
- Nick D'Virgilio – drums (all tracks), backing vocals (track 1-1, 1-7, 1-10, 2-1, 2-7), cajon (track 2-6, 2-9)
- Dave Gregory – electric guitar (all tracks except 1-8), voice of the court usher (track 2-1), 12-string electric guitar (track 1-5, 1-7, 1-10, 2-6), banjo (track 1-8), mellotron (track 1-10), marimba (track 2-2), electric sitar (track 2-6), e-bow (track 2-8), backwards guitar (track 2-4; as Lord Cornelius Plum)
- David Longdon – lead and backing vocals (all tracks), flute (all tracks but 2-7, 2-8), vibes (track 1-2), tambourine (track 1-2, 1-3, 1-7, 1-9, 1-10, 2-6), banjo (track 1-3, 2-5), accordion (track 1-3, 1-8, 1-9, 2-6), melodica, birds and bees (track 1-3), keyboards (track 1-8, 1-9, 1-10, 2-1, 2-4), acoustic guitar (track 1-1, 1-3, 1-9, 2-1, 2-5), mandolin (track 1-9, 1-10, 2-1), electric guitar (tracks 1-9, 2-1), percussion (track 2-2), piano, organ, synthesizer (track 2-5), dumbek (track 2-6)
- Andy Poole – backing vocals (all tracks but 1-9), acoustic guitar (track 1-1, 2-1, 2-2, 2-3, 2-6), keyboards (track 1-7, 1-10, 2-8), mandolin (track 1-8), choir (track 8), electric piano (track 2-6), 12 string guitar (track 2-9), bass pedals (track 2-9)
- Gregory Spawton – bass guitar (all tracks but 1-3 and 1-8, 2-5), electric guitar (track 1-2, 1-8, 2-2, 2-6, 2-8), slow moog (track 1-2), backing vocals (all tracks but 1-9), mandolin (track 1-3, 2-6, 2-8), classical guitar (track 2-3), acoustic guitar (track 1-5, 1-8, 2-1, 2-2, 2-6), keyboards (track 1-7, 1-10), 12-string guitar (track 2-2, 2-4, 2-6, 2-8, 2-9), organ (track 2-6), mellotron (track 2-8)
- Danny Manners - keyboards (track 1-1, 1-5, 2-4, 2-8), double bass (track 1-3, 1-7, 1-8, 1-9, 2-1, 2-5, 2-6), piano (track 1-4, 1-6, 1-7, 1-10, 2-1, 2-2, 2-3, 2-7, 2-8, 2-9), organ (track 1-6, 2-2, 2-3), synthesizer (track 2-2)

Guest musicians

- Andy Tillison - organ, keyboards (track 1-2, 1-9, 2-1, 2-7, 2-8), piano, Moog (track 1-2), Tillisification (track 2-7)
- Abigail Trundle - cello (track 1-2, 1-7, 1-8, 1-9, 2-3, 2-5, 2-6, 2-9)
- Teresa Whipple - viola (track 1-2, 1-9, 2-3, 2-5, 2-8, 2-9)
- Eleanor Gilchrist - violin (track 1-2, 1-9, 2-3, 2-8, 2-9)
- Geraldine Berreen - violin (track 1-2. 2-3, 2-5, 2-8, 2-9)
- Rachel Hall - violin (track 1-3, 1-4, 1-8, 1-10, 2-1, 2-2, 2-6, 2-7)
- Verity Joy - backing vocals (tracks 1-7, 1-8, 1-10)
- Violet Adams - backing vocals (tracks 1-3, 1-7, 1-8, 1-10, 2-7)
- Robin Armstrong – backing vocals (tracks 1-5)
- Daniel Steinhardt - electric guitar (track 1-10, 2-3)
- Ben Godfrey - cornet (track 1-4, 1-7, 1-10, 2-7, 2-8, 2-9), trumpet, piccolo trumpet, choir (track 1-10)
- Dave Desmond - trombone (track 1-7, 1-10, 2-7, 2-8, 2-9)
- Jan Jaap Langereis - recorders (track 1-7, 2-7)
- Jon Truscott - tuba (track 1-4, 1-7, 1-10, 2-7, 2-8, 2-9)
- John Storey - euphonium (track 1-4, 1-7, 1-10, 2-8), trombone (track 1-7, 1-10, 2-7)
- Lily Adams - backing vocals (tracks 1-3, 1-7, 1-8, 1-10, 2-7)
- Sue Bowran - violin (track 1-9, 2-5)
- Simon Godfrey - backing vocals (track 2-2)
- Megan Fisher – harp (track 2-2, 2-8)
- Rob Aubrey – bass pedals (track 2-3, 2-8)

Arrangements and technical

- String arrangement on "A Boy in Darkness", "Leopards" by Louis Phillipe
- Brass arrangement on "Swan Hunter", "Summoned by Bells", "Hedgerow", "The Permanent Way", "East Coast Racer" and "Curator of Butterflies" by Dave Desmond
- String arrangement on "The First Rebreather", "Winchester from St Giles' Hill", "East Coast Racer" and "Curator of Butterflies" by Dave Gregory
- String arrangement on "Swan Hunter" and "The Permanent Way" by Rachel Hall
- Closing section of "Summoned by Bells" arranged by Danny Manners
- Mixing and mastering by Rob Aubrey at Aubitt Studios
