= English Electric Part One =

Studio album by Big Big Train
- Released: 3 September 2012
- Genre: Progressive rock, new prog
- Length: 58:50
- Label: English Electric / GEP

Big Big Train chronology
Far Skies Deep Time (EP) (2010)	English Electric Part One (2012)	English Electric Part Two (2013)

English Electric Part One is the seventh studio album by the English progressive rock band Big Big Train. It was released on 3 September 2012, by English Electric Recordings and GEP.

== Track listing ==
No.	Title	Writer(s)	Length
1.	"The First Rebreather"	Greg Spawton	8:32
2.	"Uncle Jack"	David Longdon	3:49
3.	"Winchester from St. Giles' Hill"	Spawton	7:16
4.	"Judas Unrepentant"	Longdon	7:18
5.	"Summoned By Bells"	Spawton	9:17
6.	"Upton Heath"	Spawton, Longdon	5:39
7.	"A Boy in Darkness"	Longdon	8:03
8.	"Hedgerow"	Spawton, Longdon, Andy Poole	8:52

== Personnel ==
- Nick D'Virgilio – drums (all tracks), backing vocals (track 4, 5, 8), choir (track 8)
- Dave Gregory – electric guitar (all tracks except 6), voice of the court usher (track 4), 12-string electric guitar (track 5, 8), banjo (track 6), mellotron, choir (track 8)
- David Longdon – lead and backing vocals, flute (all tracks), vibes (track 1), tambourine (track 1, 2, 5, 7, 8), banjo (track 2), accordion (track 2, 6), melodica, birds and bees (track 2), keyboards (track 2, 4, 6–8), acoustic guitar (track 2, 4, 7), mandolin (track 4, 7, 8), electric guitar (track 4, 7)
- Andy Poole – backing vocals (all tracks but 7), baritone bee (track 2), acoustic guitar (track 3, 4), keyboards (track 5, 8), mandolin (track 6), choir (track 8)
- Gregory Spawton – bass guitar (all tracks but 2 and 6), electric guitar, slow moog (track 1), backing vocals (all tracks but 7), mandolin (track 2), classical guitar (track 3), acoustic guitar (track 4, 6), keyboards (track 5, 8), electric guitar (track 6)
- Danny Manners - double bass (track 2, 4–7), piano (track 3, 4, 5, 8), organ (track 3)

Guest musicians

- Andy Tillison - organ, keyboards (track 1, 2, 4, 7), piano (track 1), Moog (track 1)
- Abigail Trundle - cello (track 1, 3, 5–7)
- Teresa Whipple - viola (track 1, 3, 7)
- Eleanor Gilchrist - violin (track 1, 3)
- Geraldine Berreen - violin (track 1, 3, 7)
- Rachel Hall - violin (track 2, 3, 6, 8)
- Verity Joy - backing vocals (tracks 2, 5–7)
- Violet Adams - backing vocals (tracks 2, 5–7)
- Daniel Steinhardt - electric guitar (track 3, 8)
- Ben Godfrey - cornet (track 5, 8), trumpet, piccolo trumpet, choir (track 8)
- Dave Desmond - trombone (track 5, 8), choir (track 8)
- Jan Jaap Langereis - recorders (track 5)
- Jon Truscott - tuba (track 5, 8), choir (track 8)
- John Storey - euphonium (track 5, 8), choir (track 8)
- Lily Adams - backing vocals (tracks 5, 6, 8)
- Sue Bowran - violin (track 7)
- Martin Orford - backing vocals (track 8), choir (track 8)

== Cover ==
The photos on the cover and the booklet were made by Matt Sefton at Tanfield Railway, Co. Durham. Big Big Train saw a picture from him on Flickr, that Matt Sefton described: "English Electric: Side panel of a railway crane, Tanfield Railway sidings, County Durham. Great name for a band and an album cover - if it doesn't exist already, I'm claiming it!“ Gregory Spawton commented, "My band is working on an album called English Electric at the moment. We're prog / post rock. Great pictures, thanks for uploading them." So Matt Sefton and BBT had contact and sometimes later a dealing. The pictures in the booklet are from the flickr-album "Tanfield Railway, Co. Durham“ by Matt Sefton.
