= Rikard Sjöblom =

Swedish singer and musician

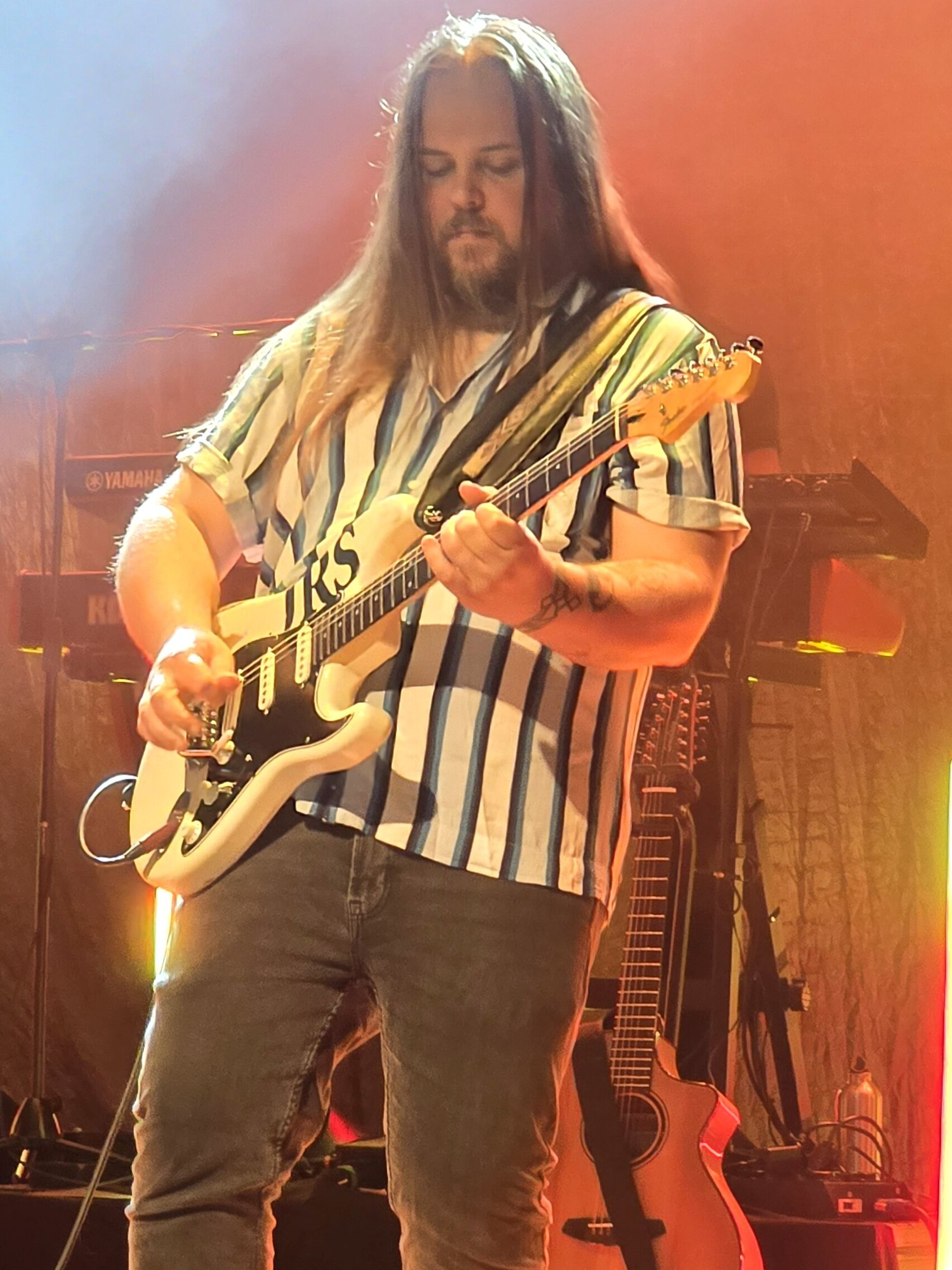
- Sjöblom performing with Big Big Train in 2024

Background information
- Born: 23 February 1982 (age 44)
- Genres: Progressive rock; progressive metal
- Occupations: Musician; singer-songwriter
- Instruments: Vocals; guitar; keyboards; accordion; Hammond organ
- Member of: Bootcut; Beardfish; Big Big Train; Gungfly

Rikard Sjöblom (born 23 February 1982) is a Swedish singer and musician, best known as a member of Beardfish and Big Big Train, and also for his solo project, Gungfly. In 2026, Loudwire ranked him as the 4th greatest progressive rock singer of all time.

== Biography ==
Sjöblom started playing accordion at age 6, under the encouragement of his grandfather. He started playing guitar at age 10, and bought a Hammond organ at age 17. He started playing guitar because of metal bands like Helloween, Iron Maiden and Metallica.

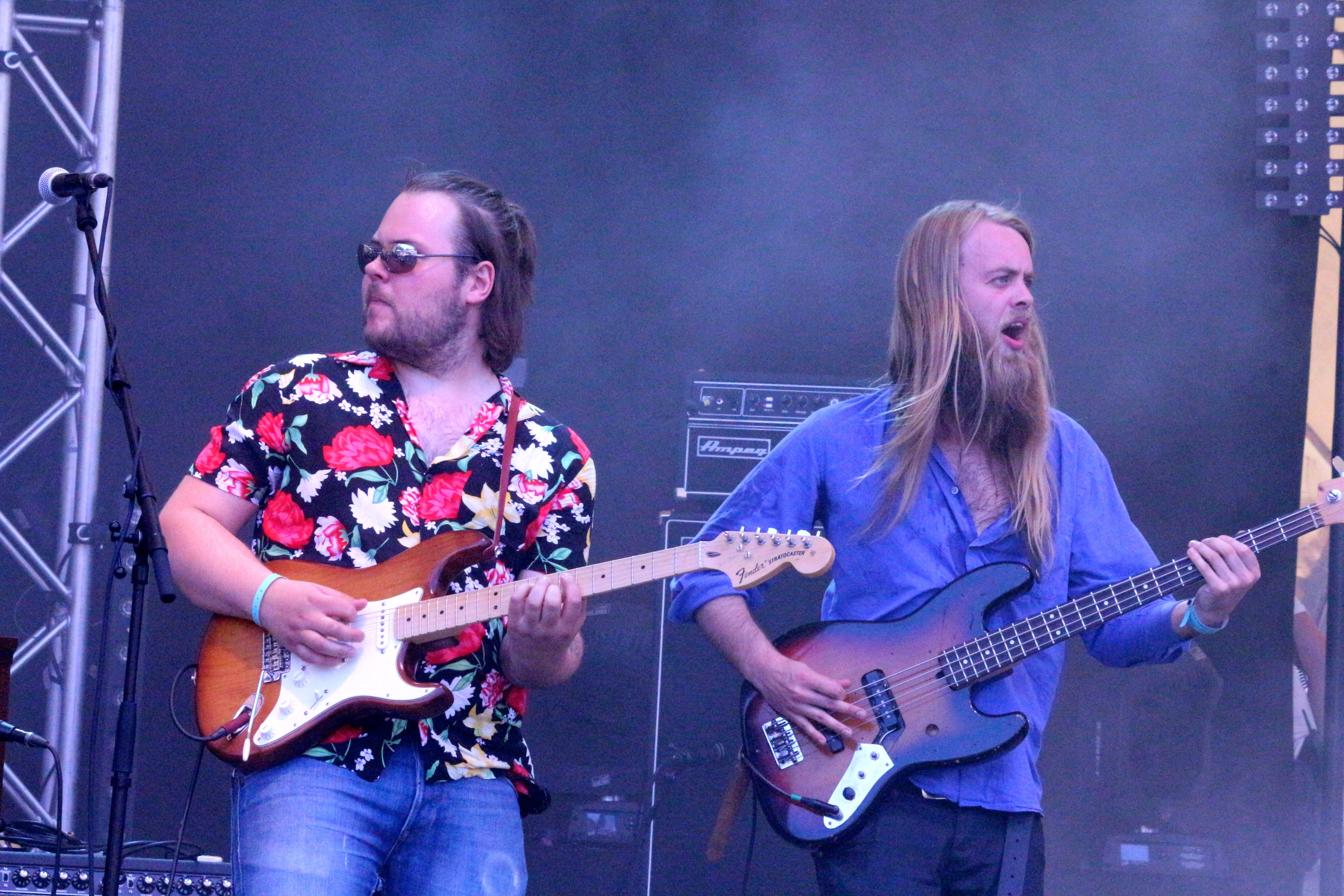
Sjöblom (left) performing with Beardfish in 2015.

After buying a Hammond organ, he formed a duo with drummer Petter Diamant called Bootcut, who released two CDs, Hammond vs Drums (2002) and De Fluff (2005) and a digital release called Suspended Animation. They continue to be active to the present day, and released an album in 2017.

He formed Beardfish in 2001, with guitarist David Zackrisson (with whom he had played in a Grunge band called Wooderson), drummer Petter Diamant (of Bootcut) and bassist Gabriel Olsson. Diamant soon left the band due to not being into the bands progressive direction. He was replaced by Magnus Östgren. The next addition to the band was multi-instrumentalist Stefan Aronsson in 2002 who played keyboards, guitar and flute. Olsson was replaced Robert Hansen later in 2002. Aronsson left in 2003 reverting the band to a four piece line-up which it would stay until 2015, when they toured with keyboardist Martin Borgh. Beardish mainly made progressive rock music, as well as verging into metal with The Void (2012).

Sjöblom has also performed with The Tangent, providing narration.

Sjöblom was recruited by Big Big Train in 2014 as a touring guitarist and keyboardist, as the band was considering the possibility of live performances. He has since become a permanent member appearing on all of their releases since Wassail (2015).

Gungfly is Sjoblom's pseudonym for his solo work, he releases studio work and also performs live under the name.

== Discography ==
=== with Bootcut ===
- Real Music Beauty Of Soul (2000) demo
- Hammond vs Drums (2002)
- De Fluff (2006)
- Suspended Animation (2013)

=== Solo ===
- Kretslopp (2001)
- Cyklonmannen (2006) with Den Gyllene Orkestern
- The Unbendable Sleep (2016)

=== as Gungfly ===
- Please Be Quiet (2009)
- Lamentations (2011)
- On Her Journey To The Sun (2017)
- Friendship (2018)
- Alone Together (2020)

=== Other releases ===
Year	Band	Title	Notes	Cite
2001	Wooderson	Wooderson	album by band with David Zackrisson	
2008	Ground Mower	Ground Mower	Hammond organ	
2009	Anna Frank	Harriets' Grief	noises on one track	
2010	The Saigon Sickness	Invocation Of My Demon Brothers	organ on four tracks	
2013	The Tangent	Le Sacre Du Travail	narration on one track	
2020	Dyble Longdon	Between A Breath And A Breath	accordion on one track	
