= London Philharmonic Choir =

London based choir

- Also known as: LPC
- Origin: London, England
- Genre: Classical,
- Instrument: Choral
- Years active: 1947–present
- Members: Patron; Princess Alexandra, The Hon Lady Ogilvy; President; Sir Mark Elder; Chorus Director; Madeleine Venner; Accompanist; Jonathan Beatty; Chair; Tessa Bartley
- Website: www.lpc.org.uk

The London Philharmonic Choir (LPC) is one of the leading independent British choirs in the United Kingdom based in London. The patron is Princess Alexandra, The Hon Lady Ogilvy and Sir Mark Elder is president. The choir, comprising more than 200 members, holds charitable status and is governed by a committee of 6 elected directors. As a charity, its aims are to promote, improve, develop and maintain education in the appreciation of the art and science of music by the presentation of public concerts.

== Background ==
The LPC was formed in 1946 with Frederic Jackson as chorus master, for the London Philharmonic Orchestra (LPO). On 15 May 1947, the choir made its début with a performance of Beethoven's Ninth Symphony at the Royal Albert Hall under the baton of Victor de Sabata. Their first recording was of Stravinsky's Symphony of Psalms with the LPO in 1947 followed by the first radio broadcast of Vaughan Williams' Sancta Civitas and Verdi's Stabat Mater in March 1948 with the BBC Symphony Orchestra. Throughout Jackson's tenure (1947–1969), the choir worked closely with the LPO and with major conductors and soloists of the period including Sir Adrian Boult, Eduard van Beinum, Dame Janet Baker, Peter Pears and Kathleen Ferrier. Despite funding cuts to the LPO in the 1950s, the choir maintained work by being engaged by other orchestras. By the mid-1960s LPC's performance standards were slipping and Jackson was invited to retire. His successor, John Alldis improved the standards of the choir and also encouraged the performance of contemporary works such as David Bedford's Star clusters, Nebulae and Places in Devon. The choir worked with Bernard Haitink and Sir John Pritchard during their time as LPO principal conductors in the 1970s. A noted LPC recording called Sounds of Glory in 1976, now marketed as Praise – 18 Choral Masterpieces, has become the best-selling recording for the choir to date. In 1979, LPC undertook its first overseas tour to Germany.

In 1982, Richard Cooke succeeded Alldis as chorus master and saw the choir through a productive decade. In 1984, the choir registered as a charity. The choir performed under Georg Solti and Klaus Tennstedt who were the two principal LPO conductors of that decade. The LPC also continued to enjoy touring overseas. A noted recording with Tennstedt of the Mahler eighth symphony won an award in 1987. However, the early 1990s was a period of turmoil for the LPO and LPC as financial recession and resignations at the LPO created a climate of uncertainty, while there was some press opposition to the appointment of Franz Welser-Möst as principal conductor. Cooke resigned in 1991 due in part to the strained working relationship with Welser-Möst and disputes between choir and LPO management. The LPO appointed Jeremy Jackman as the next chorus master in 1992. However, with the choir's difficulties being widely advertised, existing membership levels declined and recruitment of new members became a challenge. Jackman resigned in 1994 after only two seasons at the helm.

Neville Creed became the next chorus master (1994–2025). His enthusiasm helped to build back morale and membership. In 1996, at the end of the Welser-Möst tenure, the LPC became autonomous after being severed from the LPO's payroll. During this bleak period, the choir was able to secure concerts with other London orchestras and with arts promotion institutions such as IMG Artists and Raymond Gubbay for much needed financial aid. Over time, the choir's performance standard, visibility and reputation improved. Eventually, relations with the LPO settled into mutual respect and good will and the LPC was given the right of first refusal for most future choral projects with the LPO. In 1997, the choir celebrated its 50th anniversary with a concert at the Albert Hall attended by Princess Alexandra and Ursula Vaughan Williams. In 2002, the choir adopted a new constitution and became a registered charity with the legal protection of a limited company. For their 60th anniversary in 2007, the book Hallelujah! An informal history of the London Philharmonic Choir was published. The LPC continues to work closely with the LPO's principal conductor Vladimir Jurowski (2007–present) and guest principal conductor Yannick Nézet-Séguin (2009–present).

== Organisation ==
The LPC is an independent amateur mixed-voice choir holding charitable status. The choir, while being rooted in the British choral tradition, also performs a wide repertoire of different styles and languages. The choir's aim is to perform large choral works to professional standard whilst providing a friendly social network for its members. As a charity, its aims are to promote, improve, develop and maintain education in the appreciation of the art and science of music by the presentation of public concerts. The choir also aims to encourage and support for the public benefit all art forms, particularly but not exclusively those involving music, including other cultural and educational activities in order to make these more accessible to the public.

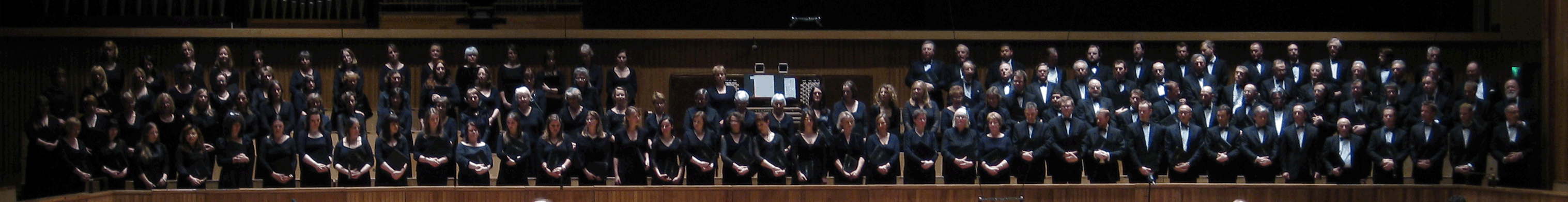
Members of the London Philharmonic Choir after the performance of Antonín Dvořák's Requiem at the Royal Festival Hall on 7 February 2009

=== Choir ===
The choir consists of a pool of more than 200 members ranging from college students, working age to retirees. There are four vocal sections; bass, tenor, alto and soprano. Each vocal section is divided into upper and lower voices. The choir also accepts female tenors and male altos as members. Each section has a voice representative who manages the section members, notes attendance and sits on the committee.

All members are volunteers and each member is auditioned prior to joining. Members who pass their audition pay a one-off £25 subscription. There is no annual membership fee. Existing members are re-auditioned every 1 or 3 years with the choir.

The choir rehearses on Monday and/or Wednesday nights depending on the current project and the rehearsals are normally based at Hinde Street Methodist Church.

=== Board of directors and trustees ===
The board is made up of members of the choir, and they are in charge of the running of the choir and liaising with the London Philharmonic Orchestra and other organisations. The board is made up of the chair, secretary, treasurer, choir manager, membership co-ordinator and marketing manager. Additional voluntary roles, including voice representatives and librarian, support the board in the day-to-day running of the choir.

Revenue is derived from initial subscription, donations and above all from concert engagements. The artistic director and the accompanist are paid positions. The artistic director also holds an ex officio position on the committee.

=== Patrons ===
- 1996–present: Princess Alexandra, The Hon Lady Ogilvy

=== Presidents ===
- 1983–1996: Klaus Tennstedt
- 1996–2014: Sir Roger Norrington
- 2014–present: Sir Mark Elder

=== Chorus directors ===
- 1947–1969: Frederic Jackson, Choir Master
  - May–September 1968: Russell Burgess, Deputy Choir Master
- 1969–1982: John Alldis, Choir Master
- 1982–1991: Richard Cooke, Choir Master
- 1992–1994: Jeremy Jackman, Choir Master
- 1994–2025: Neville Creed, Artistic Director
  - 2003–2008: Matthew Rowe, Associate Chorus Director
  - 2024–present: Victoria Longdon, Associate Chorus Director
- 2025-present: Neville Creed, Chorus Director Emeritus
- 2025–present: Madeleine Venner, Chorus Director
  - 2025-2026: Bo Wang, Guest Associate Chorus Director

=== Chairs ===
- 1946–1947: Victoria Spenser Wilkinson
- 1947: Neville Rogers
- 1947–1955: Victoria Spenser Wilkinson
- 1955–1961: Frank J. Wheeler
- 1961–1968: Christopher (P.C.) Roscoe
- 1968–1969: Frank J. Wheeler
- 1969–1970: David R. Anderson
- 1970–1972: Daniel Snowman
- 1972–1977: Vey Roberts
- 1977–1984: Anthony Shillingford
- 1984–1987: Vincent Evans
- 1987–1992: Aidan Jones
- 1992–1996: Nigel Grieve
- 1996–1999: Jane Hanson
- 1999–2002: John Peirce
- 2002–2008: Peter Taylor
- 2008–2013: Mary Moore
- 2013–2014: Andrew Mackie
- 2014–2018: Ian Frost
- 2018–2026: Tessa Bartley
- 2026-present: Alex Marshall

== History ==
=== Jackson era (1947–1969) ===
The LPC was formed in December 1946 by former members of the Philharmonic Choir (founded in 1919 by Charles Kennedy Scott and disbanded in 1939 at the onset of World War II) and the London Philharmonic Orchestra. The appointed choir master was Professor Frederic Jackson as Charles Kennedy Scott was unable to resume conductorship. This alliance made the London Philharmonic Choir the first major London choir to be attached to one of the big independent London orchestras.

In the founding years, the choir was composed of amateur and professional singers, the latter being paid a sum of ten shillings and sixpence per rehearsal session. The amateur members paid the annual membership fee of one guinea. The choir also commenced a membership drive with the placement of an advertisement in the February 1947 issue of The Musical Times.. In March 1947, after recruiting over 300 members, rehearsals commenced on Wednesday evenings at the Westminster Cathedral Hall.

The choir made its début on 15 May 1947 with a performance of Beethoven's Ninth Symphony with the LPO conducted by Victor de Sabata at the Royal Albert Hall. The choir's first recording was Igor Stravinsky's Symphony of Psalms in 1947 under Ernest Ansermet. This was followed by their first radio broadcast of Vaughan Williams' Sancta Civitas and Verdi's Stabat Mater in March 1948 with the BBC Symphony Orchestra (BBCSO) under Sir Adrian Boult. Another first for the choir was the Proms performance in August 1952 of Stravinsky's Symphony of Psalms with the LPO conducted by Basil Cameron at the Royal Albert Hall.

In the early 1950s, the LPO was in financial difficulties as funding from the London County Council was severed. Despite the LPO's loyalty to the choir, the financial crisis resulted in the choir being used less during this period. The LPO board cited "...because of the number of professional choristers, the cost of putting a concert with the Choir had become so great that it was difficult to maintain its interest." Jackson was now paid by engagement rather than a fixed salary. The LPO board also agreed "that in the circumstances, no objection could be raised if the choir found work for themselves, provided reference was made to the LPO before any engagement was accepted". By 1958, the choir's annual membership fee was raised to one pound ten shillings as a means to maintain administration funds. This was further raised in 1959 to £3 as the choir was now responsible for the remuneration of the chorus master.

The LPC continued its partnership with the LPO throughout the 1960s. In the spring of 1967, Bernard Haitink was appointed principal conductor of the LPO and in the first season under his reign, the LPC performed Britten's Spring Symphony, Bruckner's E Minor Mass and Mahler's Resurrection Symphony. In March 1968, the choir made its first television broadcast: a performance of Elgar's Dream of Gerontius at Canterbury Cathedral with the LPO conducted by Sir Adrian Boult with soloists Peter Pears, Dame Janet Baker and John Shirley-Quirk. The production was directed by Brian Large for the BBC and broadcast in colour.

However, by the late 1960s, the LPO board were dissatisfied with the dwindling performance quality of the LPC and by implication, with Jackson. Jackson's retirement as chorus master was announced in May 1969, "... after 21 years owing to the pressure of other engagements...". John Alldis, who was founding chorus master of the London Symphony Chorus (LSC), succeeded as chorus master of the LPC that same year.

Frederic Jackson died on 10 February 1972 while conducting Verdi's Requiem at the Royal Academy of Music. He was 67 years old.

=== Alldis era (1969–1982) ===
The arrival of John Alldis fostered a new era for the LPC. The committee restructured with the addition of voice section representatives. The choir's annual membership fee was also abolished. Rehearsals were relocated to Bishopsgate Institute as Alldis favoured its acoustics. Recruitment of new members commenced almost immediately with advertisements and invitation by existing members. Alldis also re-auditioned existing LPC members to maintain standards. Some former LSC members loyal to Alldis followed him to the LPC. One new recruit who joined as a tenor in 1972 was David Temple. He is now the conductor and musical director of the Crouch End Festival Chorus. David had been invited to become the music director of Crouch End Arts Festival in 1984 by John Gregson, its director and fellow LPC tenor. Together they founded Crouch End Festival Chorus in that year. It was at this time that Malcolm Hicks joined as accompanist and deputy chorus master.

Along with maintaining a high performance level with standard choral repertoire, Alldis also encouraged the choir to undertake contemporary works such as David Bedford's Star Clusters, Nebulae and Places in Devon which was commissioned for the LPC and Brass of the LPO and was given its première on 7 March 1971 at the Royal Festival Hall. Another performance of a contemporary work occurred in August 1972 when David Rowland's Cantate Laetantes Alleluia was featured at the International Carnival of Experimental Sound – ICES-72 – in the Roundhouse at Chalk Farm.

The LPC performed with major classical soloists of the decade. These included, Kiri Te Kanawa, Heather Harper, Sheila Armstrong, Margaret Price, Norma Procter, Helen Watts, Peter Pears, Richard Lewis, Robert Tear, John Carol Case, John Shirley-Quirk, Norman Bailey and Raimund Herincx.

In 1976, the choir recorded Sounds of Glory which is a compilation of hymns and songs for choir and orchestra for use in television advertisements and the like. The recording is now marketed under the title Praise – 18 Choral Masterpieces and has become the best-selling album for the choir to date. Produced by Irving Martin, it was a chart success and by 25 December, in its seventh week on the Music Week Top Albums chart, it was at no. 20. In 1979, the choir undertook its first European tour, to Wilhelmshaven in Northern Germany, performing Bruckner's E Minor Mass with the local wind ensemble. This tour was arranged through contacts from a choir member as part of Wilhelmshaven's annual music festival Wochenende an der Jade.

After 13 years as chorus master of the LPC, Alldis retired in 1982, the year of LPO's golden jubilee.

John Alldis died on 20 December 2010. He was 81 years old.

=== Cooke era (1982–1991) ===
Alldis' successor was Richard Cooke who took up the post on 10 March 1982. On 12 March 1984, the choir adopted the rules by the Charity Commission and a month later became a registered charity.

During the 1980s, recordings became less frequent as most came to be offered to professional ensembles. However, the choir sang regularly under the baton of such conductors as Sir Georg Solti and Klaus Tennstedt. Opportunities for touring became more common; in 1985, for example, the choir visited Italy with Tennstedt, performing Beethoven's Ninth in Perugia and Pompeii. Tennstedt became the choir's first president when he commenced his tenure as the LPO's principal conductor and artistic director in 1983. It was with Tennstedt that the choir recorded the Mahler's Eighth Symphony together with the Tiffin School boys' choir and the LPO for EMI in 1987. This recording won the 1987 Gramophone Magazine's 'Orchestral Record of the Year Award'. Tennstedt stood down from the LPO in 1987 due to ill health, having nurtured good rapport with Cooke and the LPC during his tenure. In 1988, members of the choir wore monks' habits during their performance of the British concert première of Olivier Messiaen's 5-hour-long opera, Saint François d'Assise (Saint Francis of Assisi) at the Royal Festival Hall conducted by Kent Nagano, a performance they then took to Lyon.

In 1990, the LPO appointed Franz Welser-Möst to the post of principal conductor. That same year, the LPO became the first "resident" orchestra at the South Bank (the arts complex which includes the Royal Festival Hall). This enabled the LPO (and its choir) to have first choice in dates, rehearsals and repertoire. In 1991, Tennstedt conducted the LPC and LPO in three performances of Mahler's Eighth Symphony at the Royal Festival Hall one of which was attended by Mahler's granddaughter, Anna.

The economic recession of the 1990s was a turbulent period for the arts in Britain. High-level resignations at the LPO management fostered tension and uncertainty for the LPO and LPC. Furthermore, Welser-Möst was not enamoured with the choir, preferring what he called a more 'Continental sound'. Inevitably, the working relationship was strained between Cooke and Welser-Möst. In August 1991, after a performance at The Proms of Beethoven's Ninth Symphony conducted by Tennstedt, Cooke concluded his engagement with the LPC.

Richard Cooke is now music director of the Royal Choral Society.

=== Jackman era (1992–1994) ===
The LPO appointed Jeremy Jackman, a former member of the King's Singers, as the next chorus master in late 1991 to commence in 1992. The LPO did not programme any concerts involving the LPC in the 1992/93 season to allow the choir time to regroup. With the departure of Cooke, some LPC members, uncertain of the choir's future, defected to other choirs resulting in declining membership. Recruitment was made all the more challenging as the choir's difficulties were widely advertised. Despite this setback, Jackman and the fragmented choir worked hard to achieve decent results for Beethoven's Ninth with Tennstedt, Janáček's Glagolitic Mass with Jiří Bělohlávek and Haydn's Creation with Sir Roger Norrington. In March 1994, Jackman handed in his resignation after working with the choir for only two concert seasons. By late 1994, after months of searching and auditioning, the LPO eventually appointed Neville Creed as the next LPC chorus master.

Jeremy Jackman is now musical director of the English Baroque Choir until 2021, the Cecilian Singers in Leicester, and the Jay Singers in Norfolk. He also gives music masterclasses and workshops.

=== Creed era (1994–2025) ===
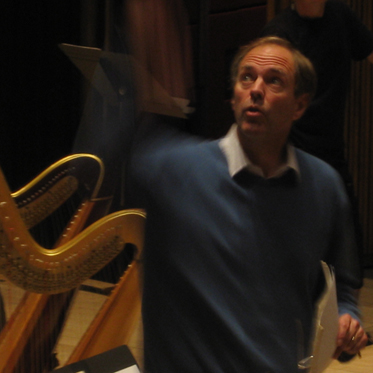
Neville Creed instructing the choir during the dress rehearsal of Mahler's Resurrection Symphony at the Royal Festival Hall on 25 September 2009.

Neville Creed was the former head of music at Tiffin School and conductor of the Bournemouth and Guildford choirs. He collaborated with the LPC by preparing the Tiffin Boys' Choir on the Mahler Eight recording in 1987. His brother, Marcus Creed, is also a noted English conductor, now based in Germany. Creed's enthusiasm and drive enabled the LPC to undertake a membership drive and to build up morale. The choir was able to give creditable performances with the LPO at the Royal Festival Hall in the 1994/95 LPO concert season of the Britten and Verdi Requiems under Welser-Möst, Berlioz concerts with Norrington, Beethoven's Ninth and Bruckner's Te Deum with Haitink, and two performances of Verdi's Aida with Zubin Mehta.

However, the prevailing economic conditions in the arts in Britain meant orchestras were under ever increasing financial strains. By the time of Franz Welser-Möst departure in 1996, the LPC ceased to be on the payroll of the LPO and became autonomous. This meant that the choir needed to maintain some form of financial stability while recognising concerts with the LPO were no longer guaranteed. The main focus for the choir was to improve its standard of choral singing if it were to survive as reputation alone was not enough to garner any engagements. The choir began approaching and performing with other orchestras such as the Royal Philharmonic Orchestra, The London Symphony Orchestra and the Philharmonia Orchestra. The choir also actively pursued engagements from arts organisations through networks known by individual choir members, such as IMG Artists (Hampton Court Music Festival) and Raymond Gubbay (Classical Spectacular concerts). LPC members were also likely to be found augmenting other larger choirs and their respective orchestras, such as the Royal Choral Society or the London Symphony Chorus if a large force was required for a particular performance. Eventually, the relationship between the LPO and LPC settled into one of mutual respect and goodwill. The choir was now given the right of first refusal for future choral projects involving the LPO.

In 1996, Princess Alexandra, The Hon Lady Ogilvy accepted the choir's invitation to become its first Patron. In the same year, Sir Roger Norrington became the second president of the choir. In 1997, the LPC celebrated its 50th anniversary with a performance of Vaughan Williams' Sea Symphony at the Royal Albert Hall conducted by Neville Creed and attended by Princess Alexandra and Ursula Vaughan Williams.

In 2002, the choir adopted a new constitution and became a registered charity with the legal protection of a limited company. In 2003, Neville Creed's role changed from chorus master to artistic director. This enabled him to have a say on the type of programming the choir was to undertake. However, Creed's increasing commitments as director of cultural activities at St Edward's School in Oxford, resulted in the appointment of Matthew Rowe as associate chorus director to work alongside Creed.

2004 and 2005 saw an exceptional number of tours and high-prestige performances for members of the LPC. In January 2004, Rowe prepared and accompanied the LPC to perform Mahler's Resurrection symphony (and to première John Harbison's Abraham) before Pope John Paul II at the Vatican. For this "Papal Concert of Reconciliation", the LPC were joined by the Ankara State Polyphonic Choir, the Kraków Philharmonic Choir, members of the Mendelssohn Choir of Pittsburgh and the Pittsburgh Symphony Orchestra under Gilbert Levine. In April, the choir sang Haydn's Creation in Hong Kong, returning to perform La damnation de Faust with Mark Elder in London and the Mahler's Resurrection symphony with the Philharmonia under Esa-Pekka Salonen in Paris and at the Royal Festival Hall. Other performances that year included Glagolitic Mass (June), Janáček's The Eternal Gospel and Mahler's Third Symphony (July), La damnation de Faust and Carmina Burana (October), A Sea Symphony (November) and Raymond Gubbay's Christmas classics and Beethoven Ninth (December).

In 2005 alone, the choir toured six countries beginning with Greece in January, Malaysia and Australia in June, Germany in July, Switzerland in September and finally Italy in November. In May 2005, the choir performed Britten's War Requiem with the LPO under Kurt Masur. This concert – the last before the Royal Festival Hall's closure for refurbishment – marked the 60th anniversary of the end of World War II in Europe and was recorded by the LPO for the orchestra's recently launched CD label. The LPC celebrated their 60th anniversary in May 2007, with a choral concert at the Queen Elizabeth Hall. This event also coincided with the book launch of Hallelujah! An informal history of the London Philharmonic Choir written by author and long standing member of the choir, Daniel Snowman.

In June 2007, the Royal Festival Hall was reopened following extensive refurbishment. The LPC participated in the gala opening concert, one highlight of which was a celebratory new composition, Alleluia, by the composer – and member of the LPC bass section – Julian Anderson. In September 2007, as part of its ongoing commitment as a charity, the LPC was involved with its first Mayor of London Open Rehearsal at the Bishopsgate Institute.

In July 2008, Rowe prepared the choir for the Doctor Who Prom with the BBC Philharmonic under conductors Stephen Bell and Ben Foster held at the Royal Albert Hall. Soloists were Melanie Pappenheim and Tim Phillips. He also undertook non-LPC engagements, such as mentor to Katie Derham in BBC 2's production of Maestro shown in August and September 2008. After 6 years, Rowe left the LPC at the end of 2008 to take up the position of symphony orchestra conductor for the San Diego State University School of Music and Dance in January 2009. Creed returned to full duties as artistic director, and the role of associate chorus director was made redundant.

With the success of the 2008 Doctor Who Prom, the choir was invited to perform in the "Evolution!" Prom in August 2009, performing Jón Leifs Hekla, Op. 52 and also the première of Goldie's composition Sine Tempore (Without Time) commissioned by the BBC. The creation of this work was featured in the two-part series Classic Goldie on BBC 2.

In September 2009, the choir, augmented by the London Chorus, recorded 50 greatest pieces of classical music with the LPO under David Parry at Henry Wood Hall. This "download only" recording released in December 2009, was the first for the LPC. This recording was ranked 4th on the Gramophone Magazine classical charts as of 30 October 2010.

The choir's first engagement under the LPO's principal guest conductor Yannick Nézet-Séguin occurred in April 2009 with the performance of Brahms' Requiem with the LPO at the Royal Festival Hall. This performance was recorded for the LPO label and released 29 March 2010.

As part of the 115th BBC Prom season, the choir again participated in a Doctor Who Prom on 24 July which was reprised the following day. The prom also featured the BBC National Orchestra of Wales with conductors Ben Foster and Grant Llewellyn with music by Murray Gold.

In June 2014, Sir Mark Elder became the third President of the choir. In February 2024, the choir announced that Creed is to retire as its artistic director at the close of the 2024–2025 season, and subsequently to take the title of chorus director emeritus. In May 2024, The choir announced the appointment of Victoria Longdon as associate chorus director starting 1st June 2024. In April 2025, the choir announced the appointment of Madeline Venner as Chorus Director.

== Noted performances ==
Date	Composer	Performance	Orchestra / Ensemble	Conductor	Venue	Occasion
15 May 1947	Ludwig van Beethoven	Ninth Symphony	LPO	Victor De Sabata	Royal Albert Hall	LPC Debut
12 October 1947	Igor Stravinsky	Symphony of Psalms	LPO	Ernest Ansermet	Royal Opera House Covent Garden	First Recording by the LPC
20 March 1948; 21 March 1948	Ralph Vaughan Williams	Sancta Civitas	BBCSO	Sir Adrian Boult	Maida Vale Studios	First Broadcast by the LPC
20 March 1948; 21 March 1948	Giuseppe Verdi	Stabat Mater	BBCSO	Sir Adrian Boult	Maida Vale Studios	First Broadcast by the LPC
13 October 1949	Ernest Bloch	Sacred Service (Avodath Hakodesh)	LPO	Ernest Bloch	Royal Albert Hall	London Première
9 March 1950	Benjamin Britten	Spring Symphony	LPO	Eduard van Beinum	Royal Albert Hall	UK Première
30 June 1951	Edmund Rubbra	Festival Te Deum	LPO	Frederic Jackson	Royal Festival Hall	World Première and closing event of the Art Council's 'Season of the Arts' (Festival of Britain)
20 June 1952	Franz Reizenstein	Voices of Night	LPO	Sir Adrian Boult	Maida Vale Studios	UK Première Broadcast
26 August 1952	Igor Stravinsky	Symphony of Psalms	LPO	Basil Cameron	Royal Albert Hall	First LPC Performance at the Proms
3 June 1953	Malcolm Arnold	Symphony No.2	LPO	Sir Adrian Boult	Royal Festival Hall	UK Première
7 October 1953	Ralph Vaughan Williams	Serenade to Music	LPO	Ralph Vaughan Williams	Royal Albert Hall	LPO's 21st anniversary concert
19 November 1954	Albert Roussel	Aeneas	LPO	Jean Martinon	Royal Festival Hall	UK Première
10 June 1955	Samuel Barber	Prayers of Kierkegaard (Op.30)	LPO	Massimo Freccia	Royal Festival Hall	UK Première
20 November 1955	Stanley Bate	Symphony No. 4	LPO	Sir Adrian Boult	Royal Festival Hall	World Première
5 February 1956	Sergei Prokofiev	The Tale of the Stone Flower (Orchestral Suite)	LPO	Anatole Fistoulari	Royal Festival Hall	UK Première
16 March 1956	Ludwig van Beethoven	Der glorreiche Augenblick (The Glorious Moment Op. 136)	LPO	Hermann Scherchen	Royal Festival Hall	UK Première
6 October 1957	Ralph Vaughan Williams	Serenade to Music	LPO	Sir Adrian Boult	Royal Festival Hall	LPO's 25th anniversary and LPC's 10th anniversary concert
6 October 1957	Gustav Holst	The Planets	LPO	Sir Adrian Boult	Royal Festival Hall	LPO's 25th anniversary and LPC's 10th anniversary concert
2 June 1959	Igor Stravinsky	The Lamentations of Jeremiah	LPO	William Steinberg	Royal Festival Hall	UK Première
13 December 1960	Frank Martin	Le Mystère de la Nativité (The Mystery of the Nativity)	LPO	Jaroslav Krombholc	Royal Festival Hall	UK Première
24 June 1961	Havergal Brian	Symphony No. 1 in D minor "The Gothic"	Polyphonia Symphony Orchestra	Bryan Fairfax	Westminster Central Hall	World Première
26 October 1961	Ludwig van Beethoven arr. Herbert Zipper	Elegischer Gesang (Elegy for choir and organ)	LPO	Sir Adrian Boult	Royal Festival Hall	UK Première
18 February 1962	William Walton	Gloria	LPO	Malcolm Sargent	Royal Festival Hall	London Première
17 April 1962	Paul Hindemith	An American Requiem (When Lilacs Last in the Dooryard Bloom'd)	LPO	Paul Hindemith	Royal Festival Hall	UK Première
2 January 1966	William Walton	The Twelve	LPO	William Walton	Westminster Abbey	UK Première (Orchestral Version)
29 October 1963	Pablo Casals	El Pessebre (The Manger)	LPO	Pablo Casals	Royal Festival Hall	UK Première
24 May 1966	Franz Schmidt	The Book with Seven Seals	Polyphonia Symphony Orchestra	Bryan Fairfax	Royal Festival Hall	UK Première
28 January 1970	Ludwig van Beethoven	Choral Fantasia	LPO	Bernard Haitink	Royal Festival Hall	Royal Philharmonic Society bicentenary concert
28 January 1970	Ludwig van Beethoven	Ninth Symphony	LPO	Bernard Haitink	Royal Festival Hall	Royal Philharmonic Society bicentenary concert
7 March 1972	David Bedford	Star clusters, Nebulae and Places in Devon	LPO Brass	John Alldis	Royal Festival Hall	World Première Commissioned work
1 March 1977	William Walton	Belshazzar's Feast	LPO	Georg Solti	Royal Festival Hall	William Walton's 75th Birthday and Solti's last LPO concert
18 September 1977	Gustav Mahler	Symphony No. 2 Resurrection	LPO	Bernard Haitink	Royal Festival Hall	Concert for Haitink's 10th Anniversary as LPO's principal conductor
8 October 1977	Joseph Horovitz	Samson	Various Brass Bands	Joseph Horovitz	Royal Albert Hall	World Première for Royal Silver Jubilee Festival Concert and National Brass Band Festival
28 September 1986	Benjamin Britten	War Requiem	BBCSO	John Pritchard	Royal Albert Hall	Part of the Britten Tippett Festival
6 July 1987	Gustav Holst	The Hymn of Jesus	Guildford Philharmonic Orchestra	Richard Cooke	Royal Festival Hall	LPC's 40th anniversary concert
6 July 1987	Carl Orff	Carmina Burana	Guildford Philharmonic Orchestra	Richard Cooke	Royal Festival Hall	LPC's 40th anniversary concert
10 December 1988	Olivier Messiaen	Saint François d'Assise (Saint Francis of Assisi)	LPO	Kent Nagano	Royal Festival Hall	UK Première (Complete concert performance)
22 April 1995	Arvo Pärt	Litany: Prayers of St John Chrysostom for Each Hour of the Day and Night	LPO	Roger Norrington	Queen Elizabeth Hall	UK Première with The Hilliard Ensemble
13 May 1997	Ralph Vaughan Williams	Sea Symphony	LPO	Neville Creed	Royal Albert Hall	LPC 50th Anniversary Concert
16 September 1999	Thomas Adés	America: A Prophecy	LPO	Kurt Masur	Royal Festival Hall	London Première
5 October 2002	Richard Fitzhugh	Where Everything is Music	Richard Pearce (Organ)	Neville Creed	Mote Hall, Maidstone	World Première for The Mayor of Maidstone's Charity Concert
15 October 2003	Julian Anderson	I saw Eternity	(a cappella)	Neville Creed	St Botolph's Aldgate	World Première
17 January 2004	John Harbison	Abraham	Pittsburgh Symphony Orchestra	Gilbert Levine	Paul VI Audience Hall, Vatican	World Première at the 'Papal Concert of Reconciliation'
8 May 2005	Benjamin Britten	War Requiem	LPO	Kurt Masur	Royal Festival Hall	Concert for 60th Anniversary of the end of World War II and last performance at the Royal Festival Hall prior to refurbishment.
23 August 2006	Mark-Anthony Turnage	A Relic of Memory	LPO	Vladimir Jurowski	Royal Albert Hall	UK Première for BBC Proms 53.
13 May 2007	Johann Sebastian Bach	Lobet den Herrn	(a cappella)	Neville Creed	Queen Elizabeth Hall	LPC 60th Anniversary Concert
13 May 2007	Anton Bruckner	Bruckner Motets	(a cappella)	Neville Creed	Queen Elizabeth Hall	LPC 60th Anniversary Concert
13 May 2007	Wolfgang Amadeus Mozart	Requiem	LPO	Vladimir Jurowski	Queen Elizabeth Hall	LPC 60th Anniversary Concert
11 June 2007	Julian Anderson	Alleluia	LPO	Vladimir Jurowski	Royal Festival Hall	World Première for the Royal Festival Hall gala reopening and LPO's 75th Anniversary season.
4 April 2009	Johannes Brahms	A German Requiem	LPO	Yannick Nézet-Séguin	Royal Festival Hall	First collaboration with LPO principal guest conductor
1 August 2009	Goldie	Sine Tempore	BBC Concert Orchestra	Charles Hazelwood	Royal Albert Hall	BBC Commission; World Première for BBC Evolution! Prom (Prom 21 and 23).
28 January 2012	Prokofiev	Ivan the Terrible	LPO	Vladimir Jurowski	Royal Festival Hall	World Première (arrangement by Levon Atovmyan) as part of "Prokofiev: Man of the people?" Festival.
25 June 2012 and 26 June 2012	Berlioz	Grande Messe des Morts	LSO, LSC	Sir Colin Davis	St Paul's Cathedral	50th Anniversary of the City of London Festival with London Symphony Chorus
29 August 2012	Herbert Howells	Hymnus Paradisi	BBC SO, BBC SC	Martyn Brabbins	Royal Albert Hall	BBC Proms Première (Prom 61)
10 August 2014	William Walton arr. Christopher Palmer	Henry V – a musical scenario after Shakespeare	Academy of St Martin in the Fields, Trinity Boys Choir, Stephen Disley (Organ), John Hurt (Narrator)	Sir Neville Marriner	Royal Albert Hall	BBC Proms Première of Palmer arrangement (Prom 32) and Sir Neville Marriner at age 90, holds record for oldest conductor at the proms.
27 October 2014	Malcolm Forsyth	A Ballad of Canada	LPO	Pinchas Zukerman	Royal Festival Hall	UK Première. The concert commemorated British and Canadian soldiers who served in the First World War. Also dedicated to Corporal Nathan Frank Cirillo who was killed on 22 October 2014.
30 July 2015	Ralph Vaughan Williams	Sancta Civitas	The Hallé, The Hallé Choir, Hallé Youth Choir, Trinity Boys Choir, Iain Paterson, Robin Tritschler	Sir Mark Elder	Royal Albert Hall	BBC Proms Première (Prom 17)

== International tours ==
Date	Location	Country	Conductor	Orchestra / Ensemble	Repertoire	Occasion
26 August 1979	Rathausplatz, Wilhelmshaven	Germany	Fregatten-Kapitän Hermann Goldbeck	Marinemusikkorps Nordsee	Bruckner Mass No. 2 (E Minor)	Church Service "Jesus Christ the beautiful world"' for the "Wochenende an der Jade" Festival
22 September 1985	Chiesa Di San Domenico, Perugia	Italy	Klaus Tennstedt	LPO	Beethoven Ninth	
23 September 1985	Chiesa Di San Domenico, Perugia	Italy	Klaus Tennstedt	LPO	Haydn Die Schöpfung	
24 September 1985	Teatro Grande, Pompeii	Italy	Klaus Tennstedt	LPO	Beethoven Ninth	
8 December 1988	Opéra National de Lyon	France	Kent Nagano	LPO	Saint François d'Assise (Saint Francis of Assisi)	
17 March 1994	Teatro Roméo, Murcia	Spain	Jeremy Jackman	Hertfordshire Chamber Orchestra	Haydn Te Deum; Beethoven Mass in C	
18 March 1994	Teatro Arriaga, Bilbao	Spain	Jeremy Jackman	Hertfordshire Chamber Orchestra	Haydn Te Deum; Beethoven Mass in C	
25 April 1998	Teatro Real, Madrid	Spain	García Navarro	Orquesta Sinfonica De Madrid	Tippett A Child of our Time	
24 February 2000	Palau De La Música, Valencia	Spain	García Navarro	Orquesta de Valencia	Beethoven Missa Solemnis	
25 February 2000; 26 February 2000	Teatro Real, Madrid	Spain	García Navarro	Orquesta de Valencia	Beethoven Missa Solemnis	
15 June 2000	Dům Kultury, Teplice	Czech Republic	Ulrich Backofen	Radio Symphony Orchestra Warszawa	Verdi Requiem	Saxon Bohemian Music Festival
16 June 2000	Kreuzkirche, Dresden	Germany	Ulrich Backofen	Radio Symphony Orchestra Warszawa	Verdi Requiem	Saxon Bohemian Music Festival
28 December 2000	St. Mary's Basilica, Kraków (Kosciól Mariacki)	Poland	Gilbert Levine	(A Capella)	Bogurodzica (Mother of God)	1000 Year Anniversary of the Diocese of Kraków
28 December 2000	St. Mary's Basilica, Kraków (Kosciól Mariacki)	Poland	Gilbert Levine	LPO	Beethoven Ninth	1000 Year Anniversary of the Diocese of Kraków
7 January 2003	Teatro Guimerá, Santa Cruz de Tenerife	Spain	Víctor Pablo Pérez	Orquesta Sinfónica de Tenerife	Verdi Requiem	XIX Festival de Música de Canarias
9 January 2003	Auditorio Alfredo Kraus, Las Palmas de Gran Canaria	Spain	Víctor Pablo Pérez	Orquesta Sinfónica de Tenerife	Verdi Requiem	XIX Festival de Música de Canarias
17 January 2004	Paul VI Audience Hall, Vatican City	Italy	Gilbert Levine	Pittsburgh Symphony Orchestra	Mahler Symphony No. 2 John Harbison's Abraham	Papal Concert of Reconciliation
15 April 2004; 16 April 2004	Hong Kong Cultural Centre Concert Hall, Hong Kong	China	Samuel Wong	Hong Kong Philharmonic Orchestra	Haydn, The Creation	
26 April 2004	Théâtre du Châtelet, Paris	France	Esa-Pekka Salonen	Philharmonia Orchestra	Mahler Symphony No. 2	
15 January 2005	Athens Concert Hall, Athens	Greece	Kurt Masur	LPO	Beethoven Ninth	
17 June 2005; 18 June 2005; 19 June 2005	Petronas Philharmonic Hall, Kuala Lumpur	Malaysia	Jaap van Zweden	Malaysian Philharmonic Orchestra	Alto Rhapsody; Beethoven Ninth	
21 June 2005	Petronas Philharmonic Hall, Kuala Lumpur	Malaysia	Neville Creed	Iain Farrington (organ)	various	
24 June 2005; 25 June 2005	Perth Concert Hall	Australia	Matthias Bamert	West Australian Symphony Orchestra	Beethoven Missa Solemnis	
29 July 2005	Cologne Cathedral	Germany	Gilbert Levine	Royal Philharmonic Orchestra	Beethoven Missa Solemnis	World Youth Day 2005
6 September 2005	Kultur- und Kongresszentrum Luzern, Lucerne	Switzerland	Kurt Masur	LPO	Beethoven Ninth	
24 November 2005	St John Lateran, Rome	Italy	Paolo Olmi	LPO	Rossini Stabat Mater	Rome IV Festival Internazionale di Musica e Arte Sacra
21 February 2008	St. John's Cathedral, Hong Kong	China	Neville Creed	Iain Farrington (organ)	various	
23 February 2008	Hong Kong Cultural Centre	China	Edo de Waart	Hong Kong Philharmonic Orchestra	Stravinsky's Symphony of Psalms, Rachmaninoff's The Bells	Hong Kong Arts Festival
1 January 2009	Bartók Béla Nemzeti Hangversenyterem, Palace of Arts, Budapest	Hungary	Ádám Fischer	LPO	Haydn Die Schöpfung	
20 April 2012	Le Palais des Sports, Le Touquet-Paris-Plage	France	George Pehlivanian	Orchestra of The Academy of Music, Ljubljana, Orchestra of The Academy of Music, Riga, Orchestra of The Teresa Berganza Conservatoire, Madrid	Beethoven Ninth	Touquet International Music Masters
28 February 2013	Théâtre des Champs-Elysées, Paris	France	Vladimir Jurowski	LPO	Kurt Weill's Die Dreigroschenoper	
2 March 2014	Théâtre des Champs-Elysées, Paris	France	Vladimir Jurowski	LPO	Beethoven Ninth	
3 May 2014	Le Palais des Sports, Le Touquet-Paris-Plage	France	George Pehlivanian	Orchestre des Lauréats de l'Ecole Supérieure de Musique de Catalogne	Mozart Requiem	Touquet International Music Masters
11 March 2016	Palais des Beaux-Arts (BOZAR)	Brussels	Vladimir Jurowski	LPO	Szymanowski's Stabat Mater, op. 53; Zemlinsky's Psalm XXIII, op.14	Klara Festival, Brussels International Music
17 December 2017	Théâtre des Champs-Elysées, Paris	France	Vladimir Jurowski	LPO	Bach's Christmas Oratorio	

== Sources ==
- Snowman, Daniel (2007). Hallelujah! An informal history of the London Philharmonic Choir. London: London Philharmonic Choir. ISBN 978-0-9555688-0-0.
