= Dona nobis pacem (Vaughan Williams) =

1936 cantata by Ralph Vaughan Williams

- Cantata by Ralph Vaughan Williams
- The composer c. 1920
- Occasion: Centenary of the Huddersfield Choral Society
- Text: Mass ordinary; Poems by Walt Whitman; Political speech; Biblical quotations
- Language: English
- Composed: 1936
- Performed: 2 October 1936
- Scoring: soprano; baritone; mixed choir; orchestra

Dona nobis pacem (English: Grant us peace) is a cantata written by Ralph Vaughan Williams in 1936 and first performed on 2 October of that year. The work was commissioned to mark the centenary of the Huddersfield Choral Society. Vaughan Williams produced his plea for peace by referring to recent wars during the growing fears of a new one. His texts were taken from the Mass, three poems by Walt Whitman, a political speech, and sections of the Bible. A.V. Butcher has analysed Vaughan Williams' use of the Whitman poems in this composition.

The work is scored for SATB chorus, soprano and baritone soloists, and a large orchestra consisting of 3 flutes (one doubling piccolo), 2 oboes, 2 clarinets, 2 bassoons, contra bassoon, 4 french horns, 4 trumpets (2 optional), 4 tenor trombones (2 optional), bass trombone, tuba, timpani, percussion, harp, organ, and strings. The phrase Dona nobis pacem ("Give us peace"), in different settings, punctuates the entire piece.

== Sections ==
The work is in six continuous movements:

1. Agnus Dei, whose Latin text comes from the last movement of the same name in the Catholic Mass. The soprano introduces the theme, singing it over the orchestra and choir. The text translates as "Lamb of God, grant us peace."
2. Beat! Beat! Drums!, is based on the first Whitman poem. The text describes the drums and bugles of war bursting through doors and windows, disrupting the peaceful lives of church congregations, scholars, bridal couples, and other civilians.
3. Reconciliation, uses the entire second Whitman poem. The baritone soloist introduces the first half of the poem, which the choir echoes and varies. The baritone then continues with the rest of the poem, followed by the choir presenting a new variation of the first half. At the end, the soprano repeats a variation of the Dona nobis pacem of the first movement, hauntingly soaring above the final lines of the chorus.
  Word over all, beautiful as the sky,
  Beautiful that war and all its deeds of carnage must in time be utterly lost,
  That the hands of the sisters Death and Night incessantly softly wash again
  and ever again, this soiled world;
  For my enemy is dead, a man divine as myself is dead,
  I look where he lies white-faced and still in the coffin - I draw near,
  Bend down and touch lightly with my lips the white face in the coffin.
4. Dirge for Two Veterans, uses most of the Whitman poem. The movement was originally composed in 1914 and later incorporated into Dona nobis pacem. Here the drums return, but now in a dirge for the father and son, "dropped together", being marched in a "sad procession" to their "new-made double grave", overlooked by the "immense and silent moon". Still, for all the solemnity, the notes of hope in Whitman's poem are set to a swelling choral paean, as if to reassure us that we have indeed learned from the carnage of World War I.
5. The fifth movement, which bears no title in the original score, starts with the baritone soloist and a quote from the John Bright speech with which he sought to bring an end to the Crimean War ("The Angel of Death has been abroad throughout the land . . ."). It continues with sombre quotes from the Book of Jeremiah, with the soprano and choir intervening with the Dona nobis pacem plea.
6. An orchestral interlude, during which the music becomes more optimistic, leads into the final movement, also untitled. The baritone's opening "O man, greatly beloved, fear not!" is the first of eight Old Testament texts set in this movement. A brief setting of the opening lines of the Gloria in English is followed by an a cappella coda, marked pianissimo, in which the soprano, supported by the choir, sings Dona nobis pacem.

== Recordings ==
- BBC Music MM340 (included with BBC Music Magazine, Vol. 20 no. 4, January 2012): BBC Symphony Orchestra and BBC Chorus, Ralph Vaughan Williams, Cond.; Renée Flynn, soprano; Roy Henderson, baritone. Recorded before an audience in the Concert Hall, BBC Broadcasting House, November 13, 1936.
- EMI CDM 7 69820 2: London Philharmonic Orchestra, Sir Adrian Boult, Cond.; London Philharmonic Choir; Sheila Armstrong, soprano; John Carol Case, baritone.
- Philips, SGL 5876 (original LP): Utah Symphony Orchestra; Maurice Abravanel, conductor
- Chandos CHAN 8590: Edith Wiens, Brian Raynor Cook; London Philharmonic Orchestra; London Philharmonic Choir; Bryden Thomson, conductor
- Naxos Catalogue No. 8.572424: Bach Choir, Bournemouth Symphony Orchestra, cond. David Hill (choral director); Christina Pier, Matthew Brook. Released Mar 29, 2010. c/w Sancta Civitas
- Telarc 80479: Atlanta Symphony Orchestra and Chorus, cond. Robert Shaw; Carmen Pelton, soprano; Nathan Gunn, baritone. Grammy winner for Best Classical Album and Best Choral Performance.
- Warner Classics 7547882: London Symphony Orchestra & Chorus, cond. Richard Hickox; soloists: Yvonne Kenny, soprano; Bryn Terfel, bass-baritone; Philip Langridge, tenor. Released 1993, commended BBC Radio 3 'Building a Library, July 2017.
