= Jeremy Jackman =

British choral director, composer and arranger

Jeremy Jackman (born 22 April 1952) is a British choral director, composer and arranger, and a former counter-tenor of the King's Singers.

== Biography ==
Jackman was a chorister at St Paul's Cathedral. He trained at the Royal College of Music and Hull University.

In 1973 he began a short-lived teaching career at Morley Grammar School in Leeds.

He joined The King's Singers in 1980, later returning to work as a choral conductor and director. He was chorus master to the Belfast Philharmonic Choir (1991–97), the London Philharmonic Choir (1992–94), and is currently the musical director of the English Baroque Choir and the Cecilian Singers, and the chorusmaster of OSJ Voices. He also conducts on a freelance basis as well as providing masterclasses for choral groups.

=== Family ===
His brother, Andrew Pryce Jackman, was a keyboardist and arranger with The Syn and Chris Squire.

== Performances ==
=== Blackadder II ===
While a member of the a cappella vocal group The King's Singers, Jeremy Jackman sang the counter-tenor part at the end of each episode of the second series of Blackadder.
