= Maurice Jacobson =

English composer, pianist, and music publisher

- Born: 1 January 1896
- Origin: England
- Died: 2 February 1976)
- Occupations: Pianist, Composer, Music publisher

Maurice Jacobson OBE (1 January 1896 – 2 February 1976) was an English pianist, composer, music publisher and music festival judge. He was also director and later chairman of the music publishing firm J. Curwen & Sons.

Jacobson was born in London on 1 January 1896 into a Jewish family. He won a scholarship to study piano at London's Modern School of Music (which led to him receiving lessons from Ferruccio Busoni), then composition at the Royal College of Music under Sir Charles Villiers Stanford and Gustav Holst until 1923. That year Jacobson adapted Vaughan Williams' Mass in G minor (in English) for liturgical use.

He married Constance Suzannah Wasserzug (1903-1988) and there were two sons, Michael and Julian. The couple were friendly with the poet Stevie Smith, whom they met in Aylesbury while Maurice was conducting the Aylesbury Choral Society. But the friendship ended abruptly when Smith modeled her characters Rosa and Herman on the Jacobsons in her book Novel on Yellow Paper (1936), which they instantly recognised as versions of themselves and thought unkind portrayals. In the 1960s his address was White Lodge, Long Lane, Heronsgate in Hertfordshire.

Jacobson appeared as a castaway on the BBC Radio programme Desert Island Discs on 20 January 1969, and was appointed an Officer of the Order of the British Empire (OBE) in 1971. He died in Brighton, England, on 2 February 1976, and was buried at Golders Green Jewish Cemetery in London.

His son is the pianist Julian Jacobson (born 1947), who studied with Lamar Crowson, John Barstow and Louis Kentner.

== Compositions ==
Between 1929 and 1931 Jacobson wrote incidental music for theatre productions (mostly Shakespeare plays) at the Old Vic. In the mid 1930s he was commissioned by the Markova-Dolin company to compose the music for a new biblical ballet, David. It was premiered in 1936 with Anton Dolin dancing the title role, and subsequently received over 120 performances. During the 1940s his solo voice setting of The Song of Songs was taken up by Kathleen Ferrier (whom he had first "discovered" while adjudicating at the Carlisle Music Festival in 1937) and broadcast by the BBC on 3 November 1947, with Frederick Stone at the piano. Among the most important of his extended pieces are the cantatas The Lady of Shalott (1942) and The Hound of Heaven (1953, which the composer regarded as his best work), the Theme and Variations for orchestra (1940s), and the Symphonic Suite for Strings (premiered by the Hallé Orchestra under Sir John Barbirolli at the 1951 Cheltenham Festival and repeated at The Proms later that year, conducted by Basil Cameron).

Solo piano music was also an important part of his output, though there are no large scale works. Examples include Carousal (dedicated to Louis Kentner and published in 1946), Soliloquy (dedicated to Ilona Kabos, published 1940), and the five movement suite Music Room, the most popular of his piano works during his lifetime, particularly the melodic Sarabande. His setting of "Ho-Ro, My Nut-Brown Maiden", a traditional Gaelic song translated into English in 1883 by John Stuart Blackie, featured in the film I Know Where I'm Going! (1945) and remains well-known.

The Hound of Heaven was last revived in January 1976 when it was broadcast in tribute to the composer's 80th birthday (just a month before his death), conducted by David Willcocks. An archive recording exists. Some of the piano music (along with The Song of Songs) has been recorded and issued on CD by Naxos. Ferrier's 1947 recording of The Song of Songs has been reissued by SOMM.
