= Shilpa Ananth =

Indian musician

- Born: Dubai, United Arab Emirates
- Genres: Soul, Jazz, Electronic
- Occupations: Vocalist, Songwriter, Producer, Educator
- Instrument: Voice
- Website: www.shilpaananth.com

Shilpa Ananth is an Indian vocalist, songwriter, composer, producer, and educator whose work combines R&B, soul, jazz, and electronic music elements with music styles from South India. Singing in Tamil, Malayalam, Hindi, Arabic as well as English,. she published her debut album Indian Soul in 2015. In December 2020, she was given the 'Best Independent Artist' award at the Blue Rhymez Entertainment Honorary Awards.

== Biography ==
=== Early life ===
Shilpa Ananth grew up in Dubai studying Indian classical music from the age of 3, singing bhajans and taking lessons. At the age of 13, her older brother introduced her to Western styles of music, such as jazz, rock, and hip hop, and she drew inspiration from Western artists such as Norah Jones, Lalah Hathaway, and Ella Fitzgerald. She successfully competed in vocal competitions as a teenager.

=== Music career ===
Ananth released her debut EP, "Indian Soul" in 2015, and will be releasing a second EP entitled "Reproduction" in the Fall of 2021. The first single from her upcoming EP, "Face Myself", was released on December 12, 2019, and the second single, "Align", was released on January 2, 2020.

She has been featured on a Grammy-nominated album 'ONA' by Thana Alexa and has performed with Grammy award-winning artists such as A. R. Rahman, Bobby McFerrin, and Javier Limón.

In 2020, Ananth became an instructor at the Berklee College of Music's new campus in Abu Dhabi, teaching voice and songwriting.

In 2023, Ananth went on tour in India. She played in various cities from Kochi to Bengaluru and New Delhi.

On 3 March 2023, Ananth was the opening act for the Balimaya Project at the Arts Center at NYU Abu Dhabi.

Ananth performed on 23 July 2025 with Beatbox Ray and Ashtar for a KÄF Concert in Berlin, Germany.

== Awards and honors ==
More recently, she was given the 'Best Independent Artist' award at the 2020 Blue Rhymez Entertainment Honorary Awards in December. She was also the recipient of the New York Foundation for the Arts Women's Fund for Media, Music, and Theater, and was the 2020 Fall Grantee of the Café Royal Cultural Foundation music grant.

== Discography ==
=== As a leader ===
- Indian Soul (2015)
- Reproduction (2023)

=== As a guest ===
With Javier Limón

- OQ (IMG Artists, 2018)

With Thana Alexa

- Ona (Self release, 2020)
