= The Bach Choir =

UK choir, founded 1876

- Choir
- The logo of The Bach Choir
- Founded: 1870
- President: John Rutter
- Music director: David Hill
- Website: thebachchoir.org.uk

The Bach Choir is a large independent musical organisation founded in London, England in 1876 to give the first performance of J. S. Bach's Mass in B minor in Britain.

The choir has around 240 active members. Directed by David Hill (Yale Schola Cantorum/Bournemouth Symphony Orchestra) it regularly performs and records across London and the UK, including at the Royal Festival Hall, Royal Albert Hall and Abbey Road Studios.

The choir's patron is King Charles III. Its conductor laureate was David Willcocks, who was the choir's musical director from 1960 to 1998. Other musical directors have included Charles Villiers Stanford, Ralph Vaughan Williams and Reginald Jacques.

In 2013, John Rutter was appointed president of the choir, following the death of Leopold David de Rothschild in 2012. Its vice presidents are Janet Baker, Felicity Lott, Roderick Williams and Sam Gordon Clark.

In addition to their extensive history of classical recordings and performances, The Bach Choir may be best known for their work on the 1969 song "You Can't Always Get What You Want" by The Rolling Stones, including their extensive choral opening to the song; in 2004, Rolling Stone magazine placed the song at No. 100 on its list of the 500 Greatest Songs of All Time.

The Bach Choir has performed for many film scores, including Kingdom of Heaven, Prometheus, Robin Hood, The Chronicles of Narnia, Shrek the Third, Jack the Giant Slayer, and The Martian. The choir has also released many recordings, including Howells's Stabat Mater and Missa Sabrinensis; Vaughan Williams's Dona Nobis Pacem / Sancta Civitas (2010), which received a Gramophone award nomination; and Frederick Delius's A Mass of Life, which received a coveted Choc de Classica from French classical magazine Classica, and was named Album of the Week by The Sunday Times and The Telegraph.

Other projects include work with John Rutter and the Royal Philharmonic Orchestra and designer Richard Quinn at London Fashion Week, and appearances on The Andrew Marr Show, BBC Radio 3, BBC One, Sky Arts and Sky Sports News. The Bach Choir regularly commissions new music, including from Roxanna Panufnik, Gabriel Jackson, Gavin Higgins, Carmen Ho, Charlotte Harding, James Wilson, Des Oliver, and Heloise Werner.

== Early years ==
Formed in 1875 for the purpose of giving the first complete British performance of J. S. Bach's Mass in B minor, the Bach Choir continued and developed to become one of the world's leading amateur choirs.

The original idea for the choir came from Arthur Duke Coleridge, a young lawyer and outstanding amateur tenor who became acquainted with the Mass while a student at Leipzig, where he studied music along with the young Charles Villiers Stanford. He formed a committee to promote a British performance of the Mass, recruiting George Grove and John Stainer to serve on it. They appointed as musical director Otto Goldschmidt, the husband of Jenny Lind (the "Swedish Nightingale") who, as a former pupil of Felix Mendelssohn in Leipzig, had a good knowledge of the music of Bach. Within six months a choir was assembled and two performances of the Mass, conducted by Goldschmidt, were given on 26 April and 8 May 1876.

The concerts' success encouraged the formation of a permanent choir with Goldschmidt as its first musical director. The choir's declared aim was "the practice and performance of choral works of excellence and of various schools". Initially, members were drawn exclusively from the upper levels of Victorian society, the social stratum in which Coleridge and Goldschmidt moved. Among the singing members was Princess Christian, the fifth child of Queen Victoria; and among the founder-members, W. E. Gladstone.

The exclusivity of the choir was perpetuated as recruits had to be proposed and seconded by existing members and approved by the committee. Of greater concern for the choir's future health, however, were the lack of a requirement for regular re-audition, and a five o'clock rehearsal time. While the latter ensured that members' evening social lives were not disturbed, rehearsal attendance by tenors and basses with business interests soon became a cause for concern. A positive feature of the wealthy membership, however, was that programming could be more adventurous without the need to resort to performances of the popular oratorio repertoire to secure essential funds.

The repertoire in the Goldschmidt years was biased towards motets and Renaissance church music, a reflection of his particular interests; but the connection with Bach was maintained by regular performances of the Mass in B Minor and some of the cantatas.

Goldschmidt resigned in 1885 to be replaced by Stanford, organist of Trinity College, Cambridge and conductor of the Cambridge University Musical Society, who had recently been appointed professor of composition at the Royal College of Music. Stanford expanded the repertoire with programmes which included the Brahms Requiem, excerpts from Parsifal, the Verdi Requiem and other contemporary works. The choir always had connections with royalty, and Queen Victoria became patron in 1879. To mark her golden jubilee in 1887, the choir invited Hubert Parry to compose its first commissioned work, the choral ode Blest Pair of Sirens.

== 20th century ==
By the end of the 19th century, the choir faced a crisis. Deteriorating performance standards—due primarily to an ageing membership not subject to re-audition, and inadequate rehearsal time—produced mounting financial losses. Membership was opened to all social groups, and regular re-tests for existing members were implemented. Stanford resigned in 1902 to take up the conductorship of the Leeds Festival. He was replaced by Henry Walford Davies, who rebuilt the choir, then handed it over to Hugh Allen in 1907.

Allen inherited a choir that included Ralph Vaughan Williams and later Adrian Boult among its singing members. He had already gained a reputation as a choral conductor at Ely and Oxford, and brought immense energy to the task. Under him a number of first London performances were given, including Toward the Unknown Region and A Sea Symphony. He steered the choir through the difficult years of the First World War; and in 1916, presided over the first performance of Parry's Songs of Farewell.

The growing pressure of Allen's commitments obliged him to resign in 1921, to be succeeded by Vaughan Williams. While he remained faithful to the tradition of the performance of Bach — in particular, the St Matthew Passion — Vaughan Williams also gave audiences opportunities to hear works by contemporary composers, including his good friend Gustav Holst; and in 1926 he conducted the choir in the first London performance of his oratorio Sancta Civitas.

In October 1927, the start of the 1927/28 season, Vaughan Williams announced his intention to resign to concentrate on composing. He gave a season's notice, giving the choir what was considered ample time to find a replacement. Probably at Vaughan Williams's prompting, the choir approached Holst, who had established a reputation as a first-rate choral trainer and teacher as director of music at St Paul's Girls' School, Hammersmith, and at Morley College. Holst confirmed his acceptance by letter on 16 December 1927, and it was arranged for him to start at the beginning of the new season in October 1928. By May 1928, however, his health had deteriorated, requiring him to withdraw his acceptance. With a new season fast approaching, the choir was in trouble. Malcolm Sargent was approached; he was interested in the role, but negotiations broke down over his insistence on using deputy choirmasters to take rehearsals that conflicted with his other engagements.

Many choir members were already lobbying for Adrian Boult (who believed the musical director should take all rehearsals); and, following the breakdown of negotiations with Sargent, he was approached. Although he was already heavily committed, Boult accepted the appointment; and in June 1928, the handover from Vaughan Williams (who was elected a vice-president of the choir) was finalised at the July 1928 AGM. Although only in charge for four seasons, Boult produced performances of high quality, and introduced challenging contemporary works. His lasting legacy was to initiate annual complete performances of the St Matthew Passion in English, a tradition that continues to this day.

Boult was followed in 1932 by Reginald Jacques, who had been a pupil of Hugh Allen at Oxford. In a stay of twenty-eight years he introduced the traditional annual Carol Concert, ensured that activities continued without a break during the Second World War, and in 1947-48 conducted the choir in its first recording – a somewhat abridged performance of the St Matthew Passion with Kathleen Ferrier as the contralto soloist. Despite several movements of the piece being cut, the recording still filled forty-two sides of the old style 78 rpm discs. Ferrier had made her debut in Messiah with the choir in 1943.

Following the sudden departure of Jacques in 1960 after a heart attack, the musical directorship went to David Willcocks, director of music at King's College, Cambridge. He was soon pointing the choir in new directions, introducing important contemporary works including Honegger's King David, Delius's Sea Drift and Janáček's Glagolitic Mass. He undertook a number of recordings, including a performance of Britten's War Requiem conducted by the composer, which sold 200,000 copies in its first five months. A series of foreign tours was also arranged to the United States, Hong Kong, Australia and New Zealand, France, Sweden and South Africa. The choir gave the Italian premiere of the War Requiem at La Scala, Milan.

In 1968, the choir performed on the Rolling Stones song "You Can't Always Get What You Want", with a choral arrangement by Jack Nitzsche. In 2004, Rolling Stone magazine placed the song at No. 100 on its list of the 500 Greatest Songs of All Time.

In the later part of the 20th century the choir worked with conductors such as Pierre Monteux (under whom it performed and recorded Beethoven's Ninth Symphony), Jascha Horenstein, Lorin Maazel and David Oistrakh. Willcocks retired in 1998 after thirty-eight years in charge.

The current musical director, David Hill MBE, was appointed in 1998, coming from a background of appointments as organist and master of the music at Winchester Cathedral and musical director of St John's College, Cambridge.
