= Classic Goldie =

2009 British TV documentary

- Classic Goldie title card
- Genre: Factual, music
- Directed by: Toby Macdonald
- Starring: Goldie
- Country of origin: United Kingdom
- Original language: English
- No. of series: 1
- No. of episodes: 2

Production
- Producer: Toby Macdonald
- Production location: London
- Running time: 60 minutes

Original release
- Network: BBC Two
- Release: 31 July – 7 August 2009

Classic Goldie was a British two-part documentary directed by Toby Macdonald shown on BBC Two in Summer 2009.

== Background ==
The show was based around the Drum and Bass musician Goldie learning how to create a piece of classical music. Goldie was a competitor on the BBC television conducting series Maestro. At the beginning Goldie does not know how to read or play classical music. During the show Goldie spent from January to the summer of 2009 studying classical music and developing his piece.

In the end, the BBC Concert Orchestra and the London Philharmonic Choir conducted by Charles Hazlewood perform Goldie's piece "Sine Tempore" at the Royal Albert Hall in the 2009 Proms season. On the performance, Elisa Bray said in The Independent that "Goldie has proven himself again."
