= Sancta Civitas =

1926 oratorio by Ralph Vaughan Williams

- Oratorio by Ralph Vaughan Williams
- The composer c. 1920
- English: The Holy City
- Text: from Book of Revelation
- Language: English
- Composed: 1925–1926
- Performed: 1926
- Scoring: tenor; baritone; choirs; orchestra

Sancta Civitas (The Holy City) is an oratorio by Ralph Vaughan Williams. Written between 1923 and 1925, it was his first major work since the Mass in G minor two years previously. Vaughan Williams began working on the piece from a rented furnished house in the village of Danbury, Essex, found for him by his former pupil, Cecil Armstrong Gibbs.

The work received its first performance in Oxford in May 1926, during the General Strike. Although its title is in Latin, the libretto is entirely in English, based upon texts from Revelation. The text is drawn from several translations, including Taverner's Bible. Late in life, Vaughan Williams called Sancta the favourite of his choral works. Michael Kennedy described it as "in the form of a homage to Bach from the twentieth century".

== Orchestration ==
Sancta Civitas is scored for a full orchestra, with optional organ, as well as a mixed chorus, a semi-chorus, a "distant chorus" of boys (accompanied by an offstage trumpet), a baritone solo, and a tenor solo.

== Structure ==
The work lasts approximately 30 to 35 minutes. Although Sancta Civitas is presented in the score as a single continuous piece, recordings typically divide it into 10 sections as follows:

1. I was in the spirit (Lento)
2. And I saw Heaven opened (Allegro)
3. And I saw an angel standing in the sun (Meno mosso)
4. Babylon the great is fallen (Lento)
5. Rejoice over her O Heavens (Allegro moderato)
6. And I saw a new heaven (Adagio)
7. Therefore are they before the throne of God (Poco meno largo)
8. And I saw a pure river
9. Holy, Holy, Holy (Andante sostenuto)
10. Heaven and earth are full of Thy glory (Poco animato)

== Vocal score ==
The piano reduction of the orchestral parts used in the first vocal score was prepared by fellow composer Havergal Brian. That score is now superseded by the revised and corrected edition issued by Faber Music in 2014.

== Recordings ==
- Sir David Willcocks, conductor-John Shirley-Quirk, baritone; Ian Partridge, tenor; with Bach Choir and London Symphony Orchestra.
- Richard Hickox, conductor-Bryn Terfel, baritone; Philip Langridge, tenor; with London Symphony Chorus and London Symphony Orchestra.
- David Hill; Andrew Staples, Matthew Brook. Bach Choir, Bournemouth Symphony Orchestra, Winchester Cathedral Choristers; Naxos Catalogue No. 8.572424:cond. Released Mar 29, 2010. c/w Dona nobis pacem
