= Mass in G minor (Vaughan Williams) =

- by Ralph Vaughan Williams
- Vaughan Williams c. 1920
- Text: Mass ordinary
- Language: English
- Composed: 1921
- Dedication: Gustav Holst
- Performed: 6 December 1922
- Movements: 5
- Scoring: four soloists; double choir

The Mass in G minor is a choral work by Ralph Vaughan Williams written in 1921. According to one commentator, it is the first Mass written in a distinctly English manner since the sixteenth century. The composer dedicated the piece to Gustav Holst and the Whitsuntide Singers at Thaxted in north Essex, but it was first performed by the City of Birmingham Choir on 6 December 1922. Though the first performance was in a concert venue Vaughan Williams intended the Mass to be used in a liturgical setting. R.R Terry directed its first liturgical performance at Westminster Cathedral.

It is written for unaccompanied double choir and four soloists, and divided into five movements:

1. Kyrie
2. Gloria in excelsis
3. Credo
4. Sanctus Osanna I – Benedictus – Osanna II
5. Agnus Dei

The work has been described as spirituality reminiscent of William Byrd and his contemporaries, and might be thought of as a vocal equivalent to the Tallis Fantasia, with its double choir and four soloists mirroring the Fantasia's double string orchestra and string quartet. A typical performance takes about 25 minutes.

In 1923 Maurice Jacobson adapted the piece in an English translation for liturgical use as The Communion Service in G minor. Vaughan Williams himself revised Jacobson’s work before it was published. This version was recorded for the first time in 2022 by the Chapel Choir of the Royal Hospital Chelsea, conducted by William Vann.
