= Klaus Tennstedt =

German orchestral conductor (1926–1998)

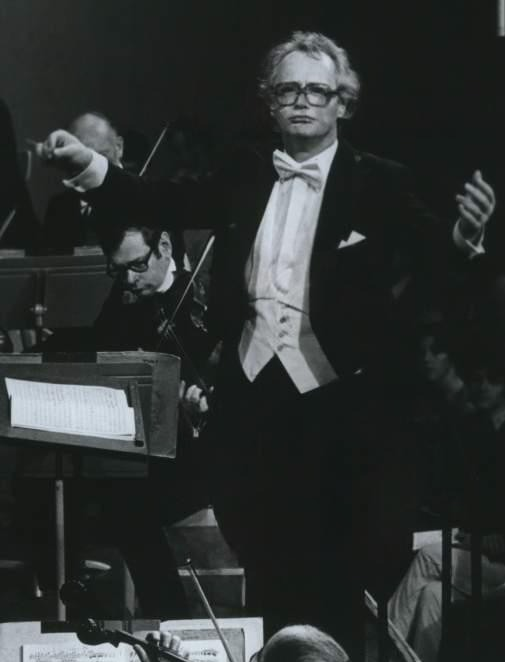
- Tennstedt conducting c. 1977

Background information
- Born: 6 June 1926; Merseburg, Germany
- Died: 11 January 1998 (aged 71) Kiel, Germany
- Genre: Classical
- Occupation: Conductor
- Years active: 1958–1994

Klaus Hermann Wilhelm Tennstedt (German: [ˈtɛnʃtɛt]; June 6, 1926 – January 11, 1998) was a German conductor from Merseburg. Known for his interpretation of the Austro-German repertoire, especially his sympathetic approaches towards Gustav Mahler, Tennstedt is widely considered one of the greatest and most influential conductors of the late 20th century. He worked with the Swedish Radio Symphony Orchestra, the NDR Symphony Orchestra, and other highly regarded ensembles such as the Berlin Philharmonic Orchestra, and most notably the London Philharmonic Orchestra (LPO), which he was the principal conductor of from 1983 to 1987. With the LPO, he recorded extensively, including a complete cycle of Mahler's 10 symphonies for EMI.

== Life and career ==
He studied violin and piano at the Leipzig Conservatory. He avoided military service during the Nazi era by joining a Baroque orchestra. He became concertmaster of the Halle Municipal Theater orchestra in 1948, but a finger injury ended his career as a violinist and he continued as a voice coach at the same theater. Tennstedt then directed his talents toward conducting. In 1958, he became music director of the Dresden Opera, and in 1962, music director of the Schwerin State Orchestra and Theatre.

He emigrated from East Germany in 1971, obtaining asylum in Sweden. He conducted in Gothenburg at the Göteborg Theater, and in Stockholm with the Swedish Radio Symphony Orchestra. In 1972, he became general music director of the Kiel Opera in northern Germany. From 1979 to 1981, he was chief conductor of the North German Radio Symphony Orchestra (NDR Symphony) in Hamburg, and during the same period (1979–82) was principal guest conductor of the Minnesota Orchestra in Minneapolis.

In 1974, Tennstedt made his North American debut with the Toronto Symphony Orchestra. His first U.S. appearance was shortly after that, with the Boston Symphony Orchestra, on December 13, 1974, conducting an all-Brahms program. The following week, his BSO Bruckner Symphony No. 8 earned laudatory reviews. In Norman Lebrecht's The Maestro Myth, the story was told that when the Boston management asked Tennstedt what he wanted to conduct, he replied: "You mean I get to choose?" His appearances were so highly acclaimed that as a result, Tennstedt was invited to guest-conduct at the Tanglewood Music Festival and Blossom Music Festival in 1975.

His only American opera engagement was a series of seven performances of Beethoven's Fidelio at the Metropolitan Opera, the last of which, on January 7, 1984, was broadcast.

Tennstedt then guest-conducted the Philadelphia Orchestra, the Chicago Symphony, the Cincinnati Symphony, the Cleveland Orchestra, the Detroit Symphony, the Los Angeles Philharmonic and the New York Philharmonic. In Europe, he guest- conducted the Concertgebouw Orchestra, Bavarian Radio Symphony of Munich, the Berlin Philharmonic and the SDR Symphony (now the Stuttgart Radio Symphony Orchestra).

His London debut was with the London Symphony (LSO) in 1976. In 1977 came his first engagement with the London Philharmonic (LPO), which led to his appointment as its principal guest conductor in 1980, and eventually as principal conductor in 1983. Due to ill-health he resigned in 1987, but was later named its conductor laureate, returning to the LPO in 1986 to record Mahler's Symphony No. 8 ("Symphony of a Thousand", EMI DSB-47625) and for Mahler concerts in November 1991 (Symphony No. 6) and May 1993 (Symphony No. 7). His last guest appearance in the U.S. was with the New York Philharmonic in 1992, but on the advice of his physicians he retired from conducting altogether in October 1994. The last time he conducted was in June 1994, at a rehearsal of a student orchestra at Oxford University, where he received an honorary doctorate a few days later. He died of throat cancer in January 1998, at his home in Kiel, Germany.

In 1978 Tennstedt became the first German conductor of his generation to conduct the Israel Philharmonic, which until then had boycotted German conductors because of their connections with the Nazi regime.

His recordings include a complete cycle of the symphonies of Gustav Mahler, and several of Tennstedt's concert performances have been reissued on CD.

Cultural offices
Preceded by Moshe Atzmon	Chief Conductor, North German Radio Symphony Orchestra; 1979–1981	Succeeded by Günter Wand
