= English Baroque Choir =

UK choral group

The English Baroque Choir is an amateur choir formed in 1978 in London. The choir specialises in the music of the Baroque period, with large-scale works by Bach, Handel and Monteverdi regularly appearing in its programmes. However, its repertoire also includes music from the 15th century right through to the present day – commissioning and giving the world premiere of Psalm-Cantata by John McCabe in 2013 – and frequently presents smaller-scale concerts with keyboard, harp, brass or completely a cappella.

The choir performs mainly in London, in venues including St John's Smith Square, St Martin-in-the-Fields and St James's Church, Piccadilly. It also travels throughout the home counties and Europe, having performed in Belgium, France, Germany, Italy, the Netherlands and Poland.

== Musical directors ==
The choir was founded in 1978 under the direction of conductor Leon Lovett, who remained musical director for 22 years. Between 2000 and 2021 the choir was led by Jeremy Jackman, renowned choral director, composer, arranger, and former member of the King's Singers. Since 2022 the choir has been led by conductor and choral director Harry Bradford.
