= IMG Artists =

International performing arts management company

Inventive Music Group
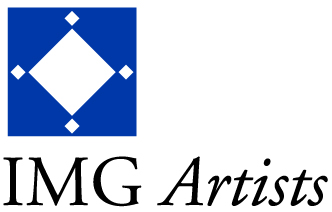
- The company logo of IMG Artists
- Trade name: IMG Artists
- Type: Performing arts management company
- Industry: Classical music; performing arts; cultural entertainment
- Founded: 1979
- Headquarters: New York City, New York; London, England; Paris, France; Hanover, Germany
- Owner: Alexander Shustorovich
- Number of employees: 80
- Divisions: Artists & Attractions; Conductors & Instrumentalists; Consulting; Dance; Film with Orchestra; Film with Orchestra; Special Projects; Touring; Vocal
- Website: https://imgartists.com/

Inventive Music Group (IMG Artists) is an international performing arts management company and talent agency. The company manages the careers of classical and contemporary artists, dance companies, film with orchestra presentations, and live shows and attractions as well as produces and manages musical tours around the world. The company's main offices are in New York, London, and Paris, and Hannover, with additional representational locations throughout North America, Europe, and Asia.

== History ==
In 1979, Charles Hamlen and Edna Landau co-founded Hamlen/Landau, a New York-based musical artist management agency and company. The company was later renamed as IMG Artists.

In 1991, the European headquarters of IMG Artists were opened in London, England, followed by the opening of offices in Paris, France and Hanover, Germany. Additionally, the company has acquired additional representative presences throughout North America, Europe, and Asia.

In September 2004, entrepreneur Barrett Wissman purchased a majority stake of IMG Artists. In 2023, Alexander Shustorovich became sole owner of the company.
