= Ralph Vaughan Williams =

English composer (1872–1958)

Vaughan Williams c. 1920

Ralph Vaughan Williams (/ˌreɪf vɔːn ˈwɪljəmz/ RAYF vawn WIL-yəmz; (Note: Vaughan Williams insisted on the traditional English pronunciation of his first name: "Rafe" (/reɪf/); Ursula Vaughan Williams said that he was infuriated if people pronounced it in any other way.) 12 October 1872 – 26 August 1958) was an English composer. His works include operas, ballets, chamber music, secular and religious vocal pieces and orchestral compositions including nine symphonies, written over sixty years. Strongly influenced by Tudor music and English folk-song, his output marked a decisive break in British music from its German-dominated style of the 19th century.

Vaughan Williams was born to a well-to-do family with strong moral views and a progressive social outlook. Throughout his life he sought to be of service to his fellow citizens, and believed in making music as available as possible to everybody. He wrote many works for amateur and student performance. He was musically a late developer, not finding his true voice until his late thirties; his studies in 1907–1908 with the French composer Maurice Ravel helped him clarify the textures of his music and free it from Teutonic influences.

Vaughan Williams is among the best-known British symphonists, noted for his very wide range of moods, from stormy and impassioned to tranquil, from mysterious to exuberant. Among the most familiar of his concert works are Fantasia on a Theme by Thomas Tallis (1910) and The Lark Ascending (1914). His vocal works include hymns, folk-song arrangements and large-scale choral pieces. He wrote eight works for stage performance between 1919 and 1951. Although none of his operas became popular repertoire pieces, his ballet Job: A Masque for Dancing (1930) was successful and has been frequently staged.

Two episodes made notably deep impressions in Vaughan Williams's personal life. The First World War, in which he served in the army, had a lasting emotional impact. Twenty years later, though in his sixties and devotedly married, he was reinvigorated by a love affair with a much younger woman, who later became his second wife. He went on composing through his 70s and 80s, producing his last symphony months before his death at the age of 85. His works have continued to be a staple of the British concert repertoire, and all his major compositions and many of the minor ones have been recorded.

== Life and career ==
=== Early years ===
Vaughan Williams was born at Down Ampney, Gloucestershire, the third child and younger son of the Reverend Arthur Vaughan Williams, the vicar, and his wife, Margaret, née Wedgwood. (Note: His siblings were Hervey (1869–1944) and Margaret (Meggie, 1870–1931).) His paternal forebears were of mixed English and Welsh descent; many of them went into the law or the Church. The judges Sir Edward and Sir Roland Vaughan Williams were respectively Arthur's father and brother. Margaret Vaughan Williams was a great-granddaughter of Josiah Wedgwood and niece of Charles Darwin. (Note: Margaret's father was Josiah Wedgwood III, grandson of the potter; he married his cousin, Caroline Darwin, sister of Charles Darwin.)

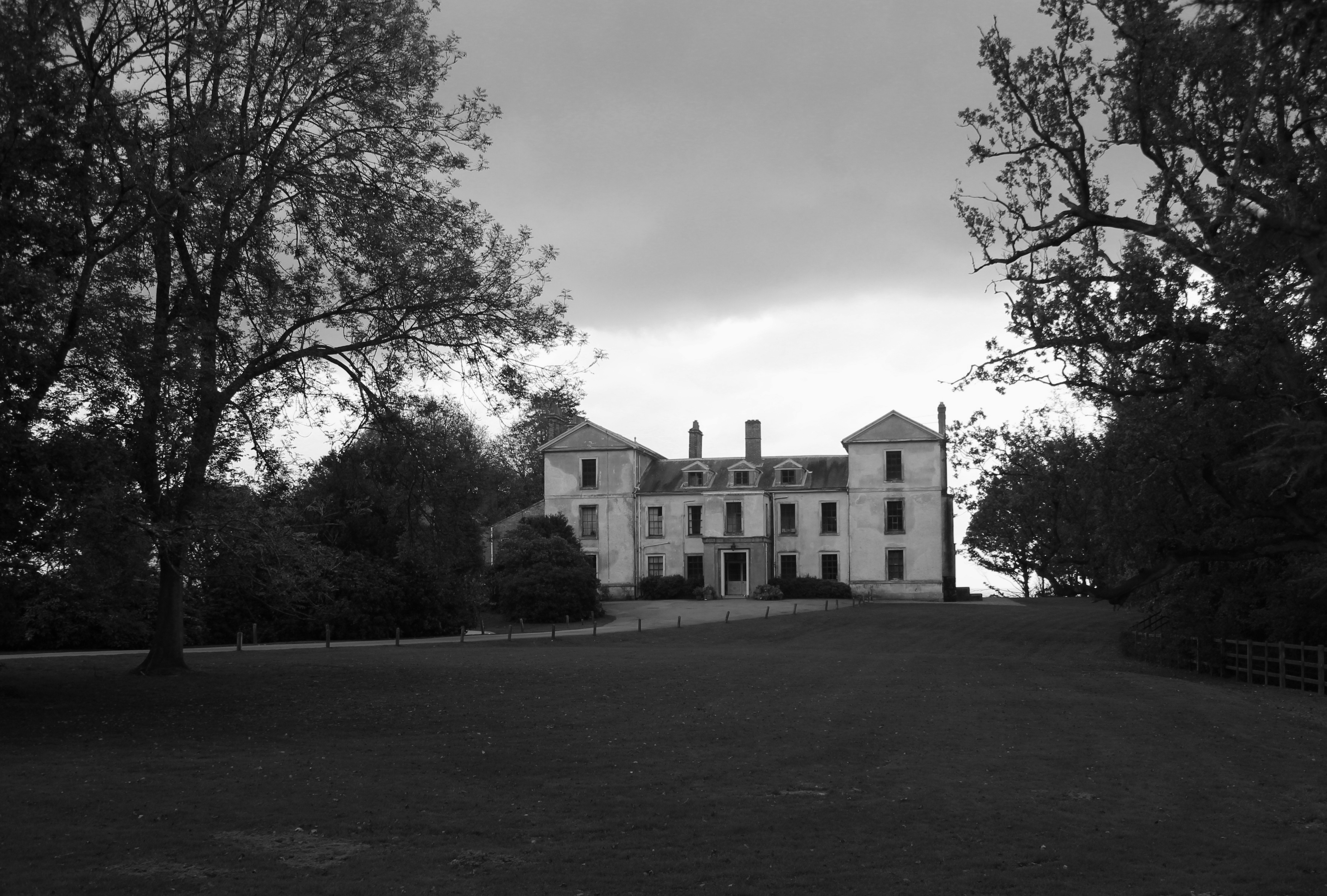
Leith Hill Place, Surrey, Vaughan Williams's childhood home

Arthur Vaughan Williams died suddenly in February 1875, and his widow took the children to live in her family home, Leith Hill Place, Wotton, Surrey. The children were under the care of a nurse, Sara Wager, who instilled in them not only polite manners and good behaviour but also liberal social and philosophical opinions. Such views were consistent with the progressive-minded tradition of both sides of the family. When the young Vaughan Williams asked his mother about Darwin's controversial book On the Origin of Species, she answered, "The Bible says that God made the world in six days. Great Uncle Charles thinks it took longer: but we need not worry about it, for it is equally wonderful either way".

In 1878, at the age of five, Vaughan Williams began receiving piano lessons from his aunt, Sophy Wedgwood. He displayed signs of musical talent early on, composing his first piece of music, a four-bar piano piece called "The Robin's Nest", in the same year. He did not greatly like the piano, and was pleased to begin violin lessons the following year. In 1880, when he was eight, he took a correspondence course in music from Edinburgh University and passed the associated examinations.

In September 1883 he went as a boarder to Field House preparatory school in Rottingdean on the south coast of England, forty miles (64 km) from Wotton. He was generally happy there, although he was shocked to encounter for the first time social snobbery and political conservatism, which were rife among his fellow pupils. From there he moved on to the public school Charterhouse in January 1887. His academic and sporting achievements there were satisfactory, and the school encouraged his musical development. In 1888 he organised a concert in the school hall, which included a performance of his G major Piano Trio (now lost) with the composer as violinist.

While at Charterhouse Vaughan Williams found that religion meant less and less to him, and for a while he was an atheist. This softened into "a cheerful agnosticism", and he continued to attend church regularly to avoid upsetting the family. His views on religion did not affect his love of the Authorised Version of the Bible, the beauty of which, in the words of his widow Ursula Vaughan Williams in her 1964 biography of the composer, remained "one of his essential companions through life." In this, as in many other things in his life, he was, according to his biographer Michael Kennedy, "that extremely English product the natural nonconformist with a conservative regard for the best tradition".

=== Royal College of Music and Trinity College, Cambridge ===
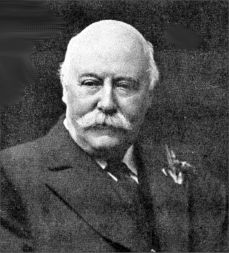
Hubert Parry, Vaughan Williams's first composition teacher at the Royal College of Music

In July 1890 Vaughan Williams left Charterhouse and in September he was enrolled as a student at the Royal College of Music (RCM), London. After a compulsory course in harmony with Francis Edward Gladstone, professor of organ, counterpoint and harmony, he studied organ with Walter Parratt and composition with Hubert Parry. He idolised Parry, and recalled in his Musical Autobiography (1950):

Parry once said to me: "Write choral music as befits an Englishman and a democrat". We pupils of Parry have, if we have been wise, inherited from him the great English choral tradition, which Tallis passed on to Byrd, Byrd to Gibbons, Gibbons to Purcell, Purcell to Battishill and Greene, and they in their turn through the Wesleys, to Parry. He has passed on the torch to us and it is our duty to keep it alight.

Vaughan Williams's family would have preferred him to remain at Charterhouse for two more years and then go on to Cambridge University. They were not convinced that he was talented enough to pursue a musical career, but feeling it would be wrong to prevent him from trying, they had allowed him to go to the RCM. (Note: One of his aunts thought him a "hopelessly bad" musician, but recognised that "it will simply break his heart if he is told that he is too bad to hope to make anything of it.") Nevertheless, a university education was expected of him, and in 1892 he temporarily left the RCM and entered Trinity College, Cambridge, where he spent three years, studying music and history.

Among those with whom Vaughan Williams became friendly at Cambridge were the philosophers G. E. Moore and Bertrand Russell, the historian G. M. Trevelyan and the musician Hugh Allen. He felt intellectually overshadowed by some of his companions, but he learned much from them and formed lifelong friendships with several. Among the women with whom he mixed socially at Cambridge was Adeline Fisher, the daughter of Herbert Fisher, an old friend of the Vaughan Williams family. She and Vaughan Williams grew close, and in June 1897, after he had left Cambridge, they became engaged to be married. (Note: Vaughan Williams and Adeline had known each other since childhood. When they became engaged he wrote to his cousin Ralph Wedgwood, "for many years we have been great friends and for about the last three I have known my mind on the matter".)

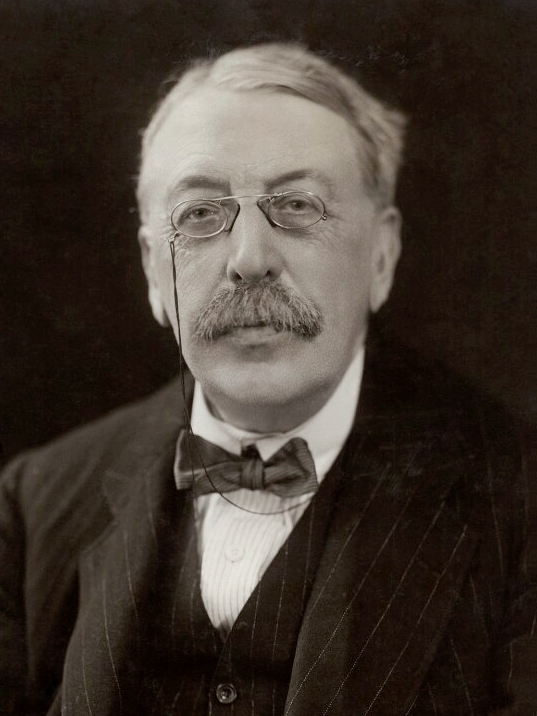
Charles Villiers Stanford, Vaughan Williams's second composition teacher at the RCM

During his time at Cambridge Vaughan Williams continued his weekly lessons with Parry, and studied composition with Charles Wood and organ with Alan Gray. He graduated as Bachelor of Music in 1894 and Bachelor of Arts the following year. After leaving the university he returned to complete his training at the RCM. Parry had by then succeeded Sir George Grove as director of the college, and Vaughan Williams's new professor of composition was Charles Villiers Stanford. Relations between teacher and student were stormy but affectionate. Stanford, who had been adventurous in his younger days, had grown deeply conservative; he clashed vigorously with his modern-minded pupil. Vaughan Williams had no wish to follow in the traditions of Stanford's idols, Brahms and Wagner, and he stood up to his teacher as few students dared to do. Beneath Stanford's severity lay a recognition of Vaughan Williams's talent and a desire to help the young man correct his opaque orchestration and extreme predilection for modal music.

In his second spell at the RCM (1895–1896) Vaughan Williams got to know a fellow student, Gustav Holst, who became a lifelong friend. Stanford emphasised the need for his students to be self-critical, but Vaughan Williams and Holst became, and remained, one another's most valued critics; each would play his latest composition to the other while still working on it. Vaughan Williams later observed, "What one really learns from an Academy or College is not so much from one's official teachers as from one's fellow-students ... [we discussed] every subject under the sun from the lowest note of the double bassoon to the philosophy of Jude the Obscure". In 1949 he wrote of their relationship, "Holst declared that his music was influenced by that of his friend: the converse is certainly true."

=== Early career ===
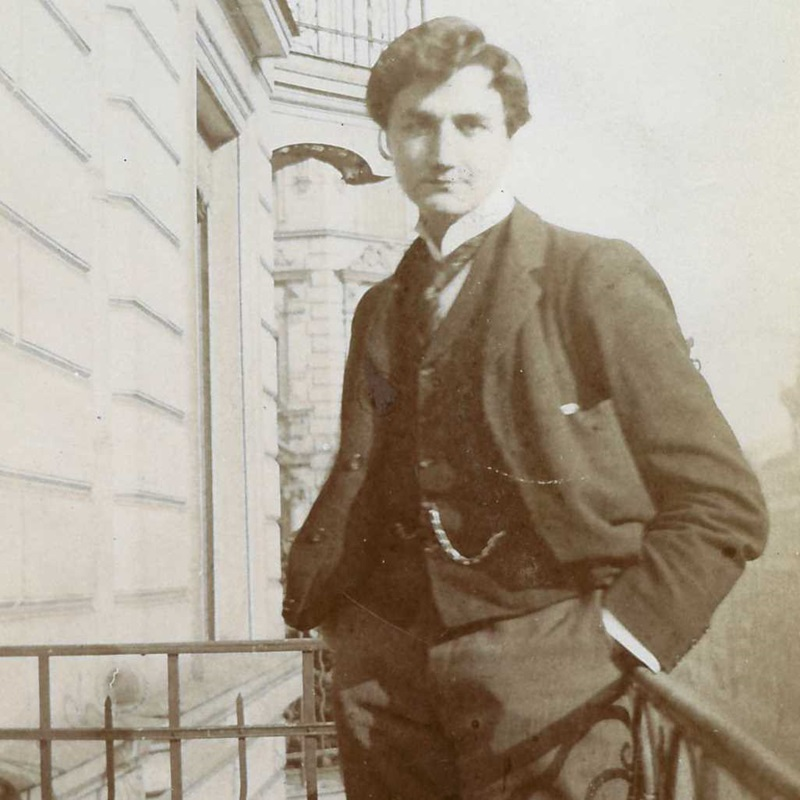
Vaughan Williams in 1898

Vaughan Williams had a modest private income, which in his early career he supplemented with a variety of musical activities. Although the organ was not his preferred instrument, (Note: Vaughan Williams had studied under distinguished organists, and was given to boasting that he was the only pupil who had completely baffled Sir Walter Parratt, organist of St George's Chapel, Windsor, and Master of the Queen's Music.) the only post he ever held for an annual salary was as a church organist and choirmaster. He held the position at St Barnabas, in the inner London district of South Lambeth, from 1895 to 1899 for a salary of £50 a year. He disliked the job, but working closely with a choir was valuable experience for his later undertakings.

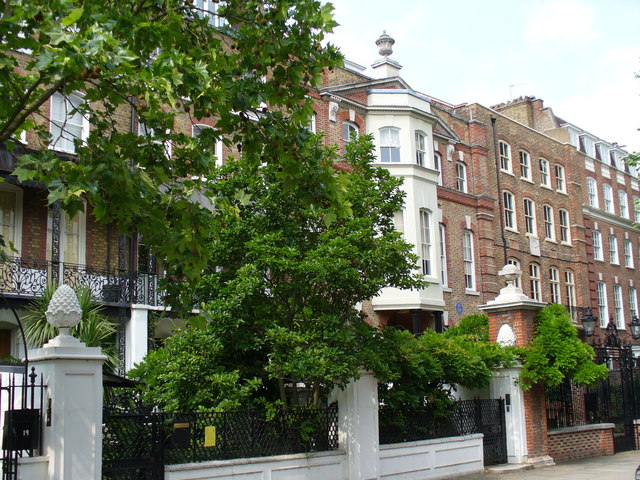
Vaughan Williams lived in Cheyne Walk, Chelsea, from 1905 to 1929

In October 1897 Adeline and Vaughan Williams were married. They honeymooned for several months in Berlin, where he studied with Max Bruch. On their return they settled in London, originally in Westminster and, from 1905, in Chelsea. There were no children of the marriage.

In 1899 Vaughan Williams passed the examination for the degree of Doctor of Music at Cambridge; the title was formally conferred on him in 1901. The song "Linden Lea" became the first of his works to appear in print, published in the magazine The Vocalist in April 1902 and then as separate sheet music. In addition to composition he occupied himself in several capacities during the first decade of the century. He wrote articles for musical journals and for the second edition of Grove's Dictionary of Music and Musicians, edited the first volume of Purcell's Welcome Songs for the Purcell Society, and was for a while involved in adult education in the University Extension Lectures. From 1904 to 1906 he was music editor of a new hymn-book, The English Hymnal, of which he later said, "I now know that two years of close association with some of the best (as well as some of the worst) tunes in the world was a better musical education than any amount of sonatas and fugues". Always committed to music-making for the whole community, he helped found the amateur Leith Hill Musical Festival in 1905, and was appointed its principal conductor, a post he held until 1953.

In 1903–1904 Vaughan Williams started collecting folk-songs. He had always been interested in them, and now followed the example of a recent generation of enthusiasts such as Cecil Sharp and Lucy Broadwood in going into the English countryside noting down and transcribing songs traditionally sung in various locations. Collections of the songs were published, preserving many that could otherwise have vanished as oral traditions died out. Vaughan Williams incorporated some into his own compositions, and more generally was influenced by their prevailing modal forms. This, together with his love of Tudor and Stuart music, helped shape his compositional style for the rest of his career.

Over this period Vaughan Williams composed steadily, producing songs, choral music, chamber works and orchestral pieces, gradually finding the beginnings of his mature style. His compositions included the tone poem In the Fen Country (1904) and the Norfolk Rhapsody No. 1 (1906). He remained unsatisfied with his technique as a composer. After unsuccessfully seeking lessons from Sir Edward Elgar, he contemplated studying with Vincent d'Indy in Paris. Instead, he was introduced by the critic and musicologist M. D. Calvocoressi to Maurice Ravel, a more modernist, less dogmatic musician than d'Indy.

=== Ravel; rising fame; First World War ===
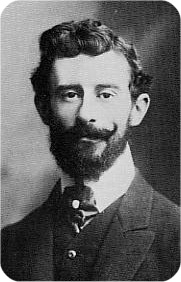
Maurice Ravel in 1906

Ravel took few pupils, and was known as a demanding taskmaster for those he agreed to teach. Vaughan Williams spent three months in Paris in the winter of 1907–1908, working with him four or five times each week. There is little documentation of Vaughan Williams's time with Ravel; the musicologist Byron Adams advises caution in relying on Vaughan Williams's recollections in the Musical Autobiography written forty-three years after the event. The degree to which the French composer influenced the Englishman's style is debated. Ravel declared Vaughan Williams to be "my only pupil who does not write my music"; nevertheless, commentators including Kennedy, Adams, Hugh Ottaway and Alain Frogley find Vaughan Williams's instrumental textures lighter and sharper in the music written after his return from Paris, such as the String Quartet in G minor, On Wenlock Edge, the Overture to The Wasps and A Sea Symphony. Vaughan Williams himself said that Ravel had helped him escape from "the heavy contrapuntal Teutonic manner".

In the years between his return from Paris in 1908 and the outbreak of the First World War in 1914, Vaughan Williams increasingly established himself as a figure in British music. For a rising composer it was important to receive performances at the big provincial music festivals, which generated publicity and royalties. In 1910 his music featured at two of the largest and most prestigious festivals, with the premieres of the Fantasia on a Theme by Thomas Tallis at the Three Choirs Festival in Gloucester Cathedral in September and A Sea Symphony at the Leeds Festival the following month. The leading British music critics of the time, J. A. Fuller Maitland of The Times and Samuel Langford of The Manchester Guardian, were strong in their praise. The former wrote of the fantasia, "The work is wonderful because it seems to lift one into some unknown region of musical thought and feeling. Throughout its course one is never sure whether one is listening to something very old or very new". Langford declared that the symphony "definitely places a new figure in the first rank of our English composers". (Note: The fantasia made less of an impression on some lesser-known critics: "G. H." in Musical News thought the work "of not much musical interest", and the unnamed reviewer in The Musical Times found it "over-long for concert use".) Between these successes and the start of war Vaughan Williams's largest-scale work was the first version of A London Symphony (1914). In the same year he wrote The Lark Ascending in its original form for violin and piano.

Vaughan Williams in 1913

Despite his age—he was approaching forty-two in October—Vaughan Williams volunteered for military service on the outbreak of the First World War in August. Joining the Royal Army Medical Corps as a private, he served as a stretcher bearer in an ambulance crew in France and later in Greece. Frogley writes of this period that Vaughan Williams was considerably older than most of his comrades, and "the back-breaking labour of dangerous night-time journeys through mud and rain must have been more than usually punishing". The war left its emotional mark on Vaughan Williams, who lost many comrades and friends, including the young composer George Butterworth. In 1917 Vaughan Williams was commissioned as a lieutenant in the Royal Artillery, seeing action in France from March 1918. The continual noise of the guns damaged his hearing, and led to deafness in his later years. After the armistice in 1918 he served as director of music for the British First Army until demobilised in February 1919.

=== Inter-war years ===
During the war Vaughan Williams stopped writing music, and after returning to civilian life he took some time before feeling ready to compose new works. He revised some earlier pieces, and turned his attention to other musical activities. In 1919 he accepted an invitation from Hugh Allen, who had succeeded Parry as director, to teach composition at the RCM; he remained on the faculty of the college for the next twenty years. (Note: His students included Ivor Gurney, Constant Lambert, Elizabeth Maconchy, Grace Williams and Gordon Jacob, the last of whom went on to work with his former teacher, transcribing the composer's barely legible manuscripts and arranging existing pieces for new instrumental combinations. Later the composer's other regular helper was Roy Douglas, who worked with Vaughan Williams between 1947 and 1958 and wrote a memoir of working with him.) In 1921 he succeeded Allen as conductor of The Bach Choir, London. It was not until 1922 that he produced a major new composition, A Pastoral Symphony; the work was given its first performance in London in May conducted by Adrian Boult and its American premiere in June conducted by the composer.

Vaughan Williams in 1922

Throughout the 1920s Vaughan Williams continued to compose, conduct and teach. Kennedy lists forty works premiered during the decade, including the Mass in G minor (1922), the ballet Old King Cole (1923), the operas Hugh the Drover and Sir John in Love (1924 and 1928), the suite Flos Campi (1925) and the oratorio Sancta Civitas (1925).

During the decade Adeline became increasingly immobilised by arthritis, and the numerous stairs in their London house finally caused the Vaughan Williamses to move in 1929 to a more manageable home, "The White Gates", Dorking, where they lived until Adeline's death in 1951. Vaughan Williams, who thought of himself as a complete Londoner, was sorry to leave the capital, but his wife was anxious to live in the country, and Dorking was within reasonably convenient reach of town.

In 1932 Vaughan Williams was elected president of the English Folk Dance and Song Society. From September to December of that year he was in the US as a visiting lecturer at Bryn Mawr College, Pennsylvania. The texts of his lectures were published under the title National Music in 1934; they sum up his artistic and social credo more fully than anything he had published previously, and remained in print for most of the remainder of the century.

During the 1930s Vaughan Williams came to be regarded as a leading figure in British music, particularly after the deaths of Elgar, Delius and Holst in 1934. Holst's death was a severe personal and professional blow to Vaughan Williams; the two had been each other's closest friends and musical advisers since their college days. After Holst's death Vaughan Williams was glad of the advice and support of other friends including Boult and the composer Gerald Finzi, but his relationship with Holst was irreplaceable.

In some of Vaughan Williams's music of the 1930s there is an explicitly dark, even violent tone. The ballet Job: A Masque for Dancing (1930) and the Fourth Symphony (1935) surprised the public and critics. The discordant and violent tone of the symphony, written at a time of growing international tension, led many critics to suppose the symphony to be programmatic. Hubert Foss dubbed it "The Romantic" and Frank Howes called it "The Fascist". The composer dismissed such interpretations, and insisted that the work was absolute music, with no programme of any kind; nonetheless, some of those close to him, including Foss and Boult, remained convinced that something of the troubled spirit of the age was captured in the work. (Note: Boult recalled that the symphony "brought many of us straight up against the spectacle of war, and the ghastly possibility of it. A prophet, like other great men, he foresaw the whole thing.")

As the decade progressed, Vaughan Williams found musical inspiration lacking, and experienced his first fallow period since his wartime musical silence. After his anti-war cantata Dona nobis pacem in 1936 he did not complete another work of substantial length until late in 1941, when the first version of the Fifth Symphony was completed.

In 1938 Vaughan Williams met Ursula Wood (1911–2007), the wife of an army officer, Captain (later Lieutenant-Colonel) Michael Forrester Wood. She was a poet, and had approached the composer with a proposed scenario for a ballet. Despite their both being married, and a four-decade age-gap, they fell in love almost from their first meeting; they maintained a secret love affair for more than a decade. Ursula became the composer's muse, helper and London companion, and later helped him care for his ailing wife. Whether Adeline knew, or suspected, that Ursula and Vaughan Williams were lovers is uncertain, but the relations between the two women were of warm friendship throughout the years they knew each other. The composer's devotion to his first wife never faltered, according to Ursula, who admitted in the 1980s that she had been jealous of Adeline, whose place in Vaughan Williams's life and affections was unchallengeable.

=== 1939–1952 ===
During the Second World War Vaughan Williams was active in civilian war work, chairing the Home Office Committee for the Release of Interned Alien Musicians, helping Myra Hess with the organisation of the daily National Gallery concerts, serving on a committee for refugees from Nazi oppression, and on the Council for the Encouragement of Music and the Arts (CEMA), the forerunner of the Arts Council, and even driving a lorry about to collect scrap metal. In 1940 he composed his first film score, for the 49th Parallel, a tribute to the essential contribution of Canada to the war effort.

In 1942 Michael Wood died suddenly of heart failure. At Adeline's behest the widowed Ursula was invited to stay with the Vaughan Williamses in Dorking, and thereafter was a regular visitor there, sometimes staying for weeks at a time. The critic Michael White suggests that Adeline "appears, in the most amicable way, to have adopted Ursula as her successor". Ursula recorded that during air raids all three slept in the same room in adjacent beds, holding hands for comfort.

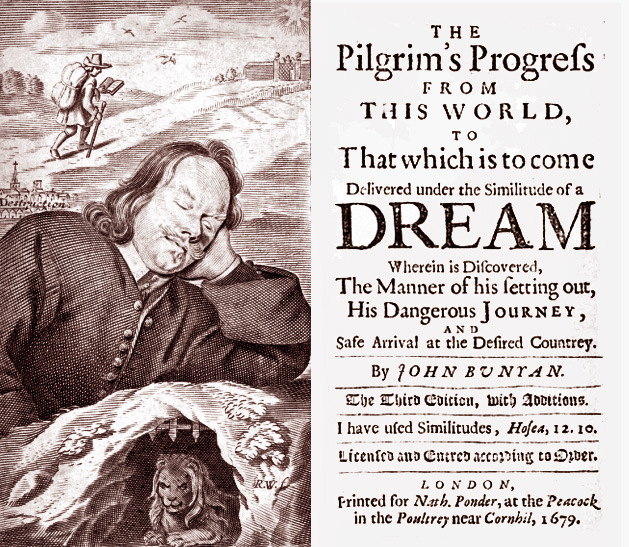
The Pilgrim's Progress – inspiration to Vaughan Williams across forty-five years

In 1943 Vaughan Williams conducted the premiere of his Fifth Symphony at the Proms. Its serene tone contrasted with the stormy Fourth, and led some commentators to think it a symphonic valediction. William Glock wrote that it was "like the work of a distinguished poet who has nothing very new to say, but says it in exquisitely flowing language". The music Vaughan Williams wrote for the BBC to celebrate the end of the war, Thanksgiving for Victory, was marked by what the critic Edward Lockspeiser called the composer's characteristic avoidance of "any suggestion of rhetorical pompousness". Any suspicion that the septuagenarian composer had settled into benign tranquillity was dispelled by his Sixth Symphony (1948), described by the critic Gwyn Parry-Jones as "one of the most disturbing musical statements of the 20th century", opening with a "primal scream, plunging the listener immediately into a world of aggression and impending chaos." Coming as it did near the start of the Cold War, many critics thought its pianissimo last movement a depiction of a nuclear-scorched wasteland. The composer was dismissive of programmatic theories: "It never seems to occur to people that a man might just want to write a piece of music."

In 1951 Adeline died, aged eighty. In the same year Vaughan Williams's last opera, The Pilgrim's Progress, was staged at Covent Garden as part of the Festival of Britain. He had been working intermittently on a musical treatment of John Bunyan's allegory for forty-five years, and the 1951 "morality" was the final result. The reviews were respectful, but the work did not catch the opera-going public's imagination, and the Royal Opera House's production was "insultingly half-hearted" according to Frogley. The piece was revived the following year, but was still not a great success. Vaughan Williams commented to Ursula, "They don't like it, they won't like it, they don't want an opera with no heroine and no love duets—and I don't care, it's what I meant, and there it is."

=== Second marriage and last years ===
In February 1953 Vaughan Williams and Ursula were married. (Note: There were no children of the marriage.) He left the Dorking house and they took a lease of 10 Hanover Terrace, Regent's Park, London. It was the year of Queen Elizabeth II's coronation; Vaughan Williams's contribution was an arrangement of the Old Hundredth psalm tune, and a new setting of "O taste and see" from Psalm 34, performed at the service in Westminster Abbey.

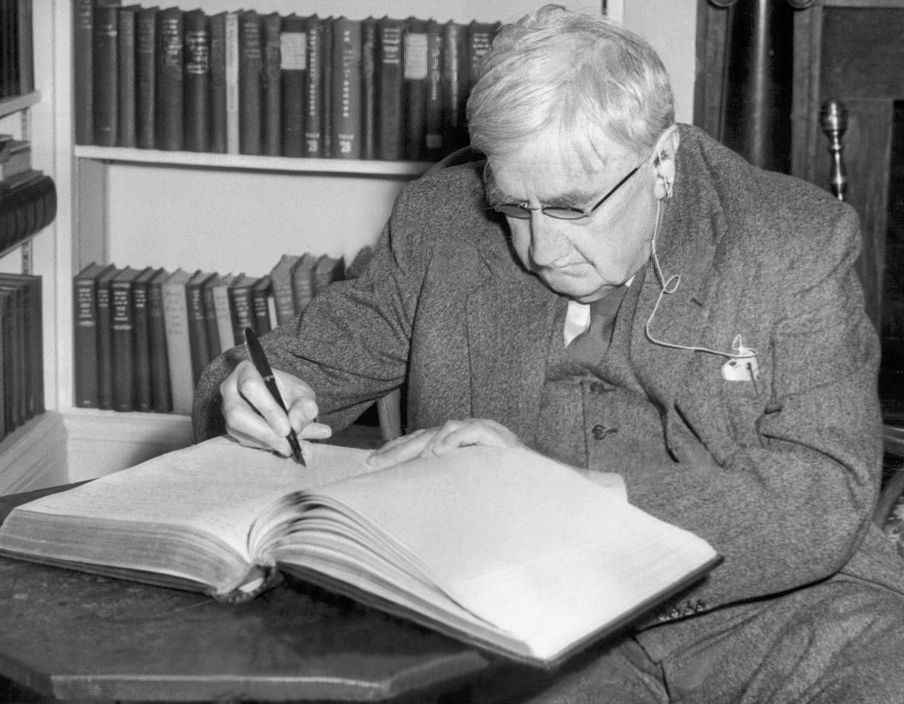
Vaughan Williams signing the guest book at Yale University in 1954

Having returned to live in London, Vaughan Williams, with Ursula's encouragement, became much more active socially and in pro bono publico activities. He was a leading figure in the Society for the Promotion of New Music, and in 1956 he set up and endowed the RVW Trust to support young composers and promote new or neglected music. (Note: In 2022, on the 150th anniversary of the composer's birth, and following a merger with the Vaughan Williams Charitable Trust, the RVW Trust became the Vaughan Williams Foundation.) He and his wife travelled extensively in Europe, and in 1954 he visited the US once again, having been invited to lecture at Cornell and other universities and to conduct. He received an enthusiastic welcome from large audiences, and was overwhelmed at the warmth of his reception. Kennedy describes it as "like a musical state occasion".

Of Vaughan Williams's works from the 1950s, Grove makes particular mention of Three Shakespeare Songs (1951) for unaccompanied chorus, the Christmas cantata Hodie (1953–1954), the Violin Sonata, and, most particularly, the Ten Blake Songs (1957) for voice and oboe, "a masterpiece of economy and precision". Unfinished works from the decade were a cello concerto and a new opera, Thomas the Rhymer. The predominant works of the 1950s were his three last symphonies. The seventh—officially unnumbered, and titled Sinfonia antartica—divided opinion; the score is a reworking of music Vaughan Williams had written for the 1948 film Scott of the Antarctic, and some critics thought it not truly symphonic. The Eighth, though wistful in parts, is predominantly lighthearted in tone; it was received enthusiastically at its premiere in 1956, given by the Hallé Orchestra under the dedicatee, Sir John Barbirolli. The Ninth, premiered at a Royal Philharmonic Society concert conducted by Sir Malcolm Sargent in April 1958, puzzled critics with its sombre, questing tone, and did not immediately achieve the recognition it later gained.

Having been in excellent health, Vaughan Williams died suddenly in the early hours of 26 August 1958 at Hanover Terrace, aged 85. Two days later, after a private funeral at Golders Green, he was cremated. On 19 September, at a crowded memorial service, his ashes were interred near the burial plots of Purcell and Stanford in the north choir aisle of Westminster Abbey.

== Music ==
Opening of Fantasia on a Theme by Thomas Tallis, 1910

Michael Kennedy characterises Vaughan Williams's music as a strongly individual blending of the modal harmonies familiar from folk‐song with the French influence of Ravel and Debussy. The basis of his work is melody, his rhythms, in Kennedy's view, being unsubtle at times. Vaughan Williams's music is often described as visionary; (Note: The word is used repeatedly in discussions of Vaughan Williams by composers such as Herbert Howells, Anthony Payne, and Wilfrid Mellers, conductors including Sakari Oramo, and scholars such as Byron Adams, Kennedy, and Hugh Ottaway.) Kennedy cites the masque Job and the Fifth and Ninth Symphonies. Vaughan Williams's output was prolific and wide-ranging. For the voice he composed songs, operas, and choral works ranging from simpler pieces suitable for amateurs to demanding works for professional choruses. His comparatively few chamber works are not among his better-known compositions. Some of his finest works elude conventional categorisation, such as the Serenade to Music (1938) for sixteen solo singers and orchestra; Flos Campi (1925) for solo viola, small orchestra, and small chorus; and his most important chamber work, in Howes's view—not purely instrumental but a song cycle—On Wenlock Edge (1909) with accompaniment for string quartet and piano.

In 1955 the authors of The Record Guide, Edward Sackville-West and Desmond Shawe-Taylor, wrote that Vaughan Williams's music showed an exceptionally strong individual voice: Vaughan Williams's style is "not remarkable for grace or politeness or inventive colour", but expresses "a consistent vision in which thought and feeling and their equivalent images in music never fall below a certain high level of natural distinction". They commented that the composer's vision is expressed in two main contrasting moods: "the one contemplative and trance-like, the other pugnacious and sinister". The first mood, generally predominant in the composer's output, was more popular, as audiences preferred "the stained-glass beauty of the Tallis Fantasia, the direct melodic appeal of the Serenade to Music, the pastoral poetry of The Lark Ascending, and the grave serenity of the Fifth Symphony". By contrast, as in the ferocity of the Fourth and Sixth Symphonies and the Concerto for Two Pianos: "in his grimmer moods Vaughan Williams can be as frightening as Sibelius and Bartók".

=== Symphonies ===
It is as a symphonist that Vaughan Williams is best known. The composer and academic Elliott Schwartz wrote (1964), "It may be said with truth that Vaughan Williams, Sibelius and Prokofieff are the symphonists of this century". Although Vaughan Williams did not complete the first of them until he was thirty-eight years old, the nine symphonies span nearly half a century of his creative life. In his 1964 analysis of the nine, Schwartz found it striking that no two of the symphonies are alike, either in structure or in mood. Commentators have found it useful to consider the nine in three groups of three—early, middle and late.

External audio
- A Sea Symphony

==== Sea, London and Pastoral Symphonies (1910–1922) ====
The first three symphonies, to which Vaughan Williams assigned titles rather than numbers, (Note: Vaughan Williams did not assign numbers to any of his symphonies before No 8, but Nos 4–6 have generally been referred to by number nevertheless.) form a sub-group within the nine, having programmatic elements absent from the later six.

A Sea Symphony (1910), the only one of the series to include a part for full choir, differs from most earlier choral symphonies in that the choir sings in all the movements. The extent to which it is a true symphony has been debated; in a 2013 study, Alain Frogley describes it as a hybrid work, with elements of symphony, oratorio and cantata. Its sheer length—about eighty minutes—was unprecedented for an English symphonic work, and within its thoroughly tonal construction it contains harmonic dissonances that pre-echo the early works of Stravinsky which were soon to follow. A London Symphony (1911–1913) which the composer later observed might more accurately be called a "symphony by a Londoner", is for the most part not overtly pictorial in its presentation of London. Vaughan Williams insisted that it is "self-expressive, and must stand or fall as 'absolute' music". There are some references to the urban soundscape: brief impressions of street music, with the sound of the barrel organ mimicked by the orchestra; the characteristic chant of the lavender-seller; the jingle of hansom cabs; and the chimes of Big Ben played by harp and clarinet. But commentators have heard—and the composer never denied or confirmed—some social comment in sinister echoes at the end of the scherzo and an orchestral outburst of pain and despair at the opening of the finale. Schwartz comments that the symphony, in its "unified presentation of widely heterogeneous elements", is "very much like the city itself". Vaughan Williams said in his later years that this was his favourite of the symphonies. (Note: This was in 1951, when the last three symphonies were yet to be written.)

The last of the first group is A Pastoral Symphony (1921). The first three movements are for orchestra alone; a wordless solo soprano or tenor voice is added in the finale. Despite the title the symphony draws little on the folk-songs beloved of the composer, and the pastoral landscape evoked is not a tranquil English scene, but the French countryside ravaged by war. Some English musicians who had not fought in the First World War misunderstood the work and heard only the slow tempi and quiet tone, failing to notice the character of a requiem in the music and mistaking the piece for a rustic idyll. (Note: Peter Warlock commented that the symphony was "like a cow looking over a gate", though he added, "but after all, it's a very great work" and Sir Hugh Allen said the work conjured up "VW rolling over and over in a ploughed field on a wet day".) Kennedy comments that it was not until after the Second World War that "the spectral 'Last Post' in the second movement and the girl's lamenting voice in the finale" were widely noticed and understood.

==== Symphonies 4–6 (1935–1948) ====
The middle three symphonies are purely orchestral, and generally conventional in form, with sonata form (modified in places), specified home keys, and four-movement structure. The orchestral forces required are not large by the standards of the first half of the 20th century, although the Fourth calls for an augmented woodwind section and the Sixth includes a part for tenor saxophone. The Fourth Symphony (1935) astonished listeners with its striking dissonance, far removed from the prevailing quiet tone of the previous symphony. The composer firmly contradicted any notions that the work was programmatical in any respect, and Kennedy calls attempts to give the work "a meretricious programme ... a poor compliment to its musical vitality and self-sufficiency".

The Fifth Symphony (1943) was in complete contrast to its predecessor. Vaughan Williams had been working on and off for many years on his operatic version of Bunyan's The Pilgrim's Progress. Fearing—wrongly as it turned out—that the opera would never be completed, Vaughan Williams reworked some of the music already written for it into a new symphony. Despite the internal tensions caused by the deliberate conflict of modality in places, the work is generally serene in character, and was particularly well received for the comfort it gave at a time of all-out war. Neville Cardus later wrote, "The Fifth Symphony contains the most benedictory and consoling music of our time."

With the Sixth Symphony (1948) Vaughan Williams once again confounded expectations. Many had seen the Fifth, composed when he was seventy, as a valedictory work, and the turbulent, troubled Sixth came as a shock. After violent orchestral clashes in the first movement, the obsessive ostinato of the second and the "diabolic" scherzo, the finale perplexed many listeners. Described as "one of the strangest journeys ever undertaken in music", it is marked pianissimo throughout its 10–12-minute duration. (Note: In 1956 the composer said in a letter to Michael Kennedy that the nearest that words could get to what he intended in the finale were Prospero's in The Tempest: "We are such stuff as dreams are made on, and our little life is rounded with a sleep.")

==== Sinfonia antartica, Symphonies 8 and 9 (1952–1957) ====
The seventh symphony, the Sinfonia antartica (1952), a by-product of the composer's score for Scott of the Antarctic, has consistently divided critical opinion on whether it can be properly classed as a symphony. Alain Frogley in Grove argues that though the work can make a deep impression on the listener, it is neither a true symphony in the understood sense of the term nor a tone poem and is consequently the least successful of the mature symphonies. The work is in five movements, with wordless vocal lines for female chorus and solo soprano in the first and last movements. In addition to large woodwind and percussion sections the score features a prominent part for wind machine.

The Eighth Symphony (1956) in D minor is noticeably different from its seven predecessors by virtue of its brevity and, despite its minor key, its general light-heartedness. The orchestra is smaller than for most of the symphonies, with the exception of the percussion section, which is particularly large, with, as Vaughan Williams put it, "all the 'phones' and 'spiels' known to the composer". The work was enthusiastically received at its early performances, and has remained among Vaughan Williams's most popular works.

The final symphony, the Ninth, was completed in late 1957 and premiered in April 1958, four months before the composer's death. It is scored for a large orchestra, including three saxophones, a flugelhorn, and an enlarged percussion section. The mood is more sombre than that of the Eighth; Grove calls its mood "at once heroic and contemplative, defiant and wistfully absorbed". The work received an ovation at its premiere, but at first the critics were not sure what to make of it, and it took some years for it to be generally ranked alongside its eight predecessors.

=== Other orchestral music ===
External media

Audio
- The Lark Ascending
- Fantasia on Greensleeves

Video
- Fantasia on a Theme by Thomas Tallis

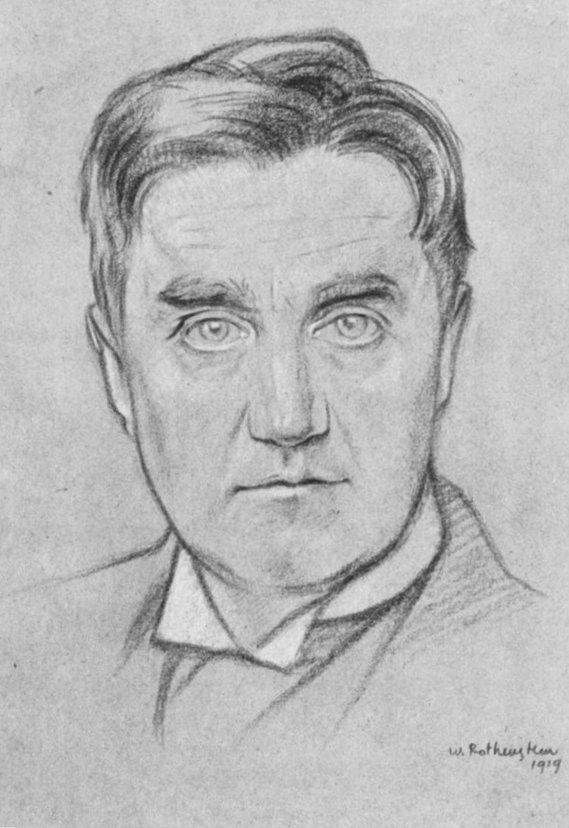
Vaughan Williams in 1919, by William Rothenstein

Grove lists more than thirty works by Vaughan Williams for orchestra or band over and above the symphonies. They include two of his most popular works—the Fantasia on a Theme by Thomas Tallis (1910, revised 1919), and The Lark Ascending, originally for violin and piano (1914); orchestrated 1920. Other works that survive in the repertoire in Britain are the Norfolk Rhapsody No 1 (1905–1906), The Wasps (An Aristophanic Suite) (1909) – the overture in particular – the English Folk Song Suite (1923) and the Fantasia on Greensleeves (1934).

Vaughan Williams wrote four concertos: for violin (1925), piano (1926), oboe (1944) and tuba (1954); another concertante piece is his "Romance for harmonica, strings and piano" (1951), written for Larry Adler. None of these works has rivalled the popularity of the symphonies or the short orchestral works mentioned above. (Note: The 2015 concert listings section of the Ralph Vaughan Williams Society lists no performances of any of the concertos in Britain during that year, and, internationally, one performance of the "Oboe Concerto" (in Las Palmas) and one of the Piano Concerto (in Seattle).) Bartók was among the admirers of the Piano Concerto, written for and championed by Harriet Cohen, but it has remained, in the words of the critic Andrew Achenbach, a neglected masterpiece.

In addition to the music for Scott of the Antarctic, Vaughan Williams composed incidental music for eleven other films, from 49th Parallel (1941) to The Vision of William Blake (1957).

=== Chamber and instrumental ===
By comparison with his output in other genres, Vaughan Williams's music for chamber ensembles and solo instruments forms a small part of his oeuvre. Grove lists twenty-four pieces under the heading "Chamber and instrumental"; three are early, unpublished works. Vaughan Williams, like most leading British 20th-century composers, was not drawn to the solo piano and wrote little for it. (Note: The composer and musical scholar Christopher Palmer includes Vaughan Williams in the list of major British composers, along with Elgar, Delius, Holst, Walton and Britten, who showed little interest in the solo piano and seldom wrote for it.) From his mature years, there survive for standard chamber groupings two string quartets (1908–1909, revised 1921; and 1943–1944), a "phantasy" string quintet (1912), and a sonata for violin and piano (1954). The first quartet was written soon after Vaughan Williams's studies in Paris with Ravel, whose influence is strongly evident. (Note: Vaughan Williams was amused by the comment of a friend who correctly detected the French influence, but thought "I must have been having tea with Debussy.") In 2002 the magazine Gramophone described the second quartet as a masterpiece that should be, but is not, part of the international chamber repertory. It is from the same period as the Sixth Symphony, and has something of that work's severity and anguish. The quintet (1912) was written two years after the success of the Tallis Fantasia, with which it has elements in common, both in terms of instrumental layout and the mood of rapt contemplation. The violin sonata has made little impact.

=== Vocal music ===
Ursula Vaughan Williams wrote of her husband's love of literature, and listed some of his favourite writers and writings:

From Skelton and Chaucer, Sidney, Spenser, the Authorised Version of the Bible, the madrigal poets, the anonymous poets, to Shakespeare—inevitably and devotedly—on to Herbert and his contemporaries, Milton, Bunyan, and Shelley, Tennyson, Swinburne, both Rossettis, Whitman, Barnes, Hardy and Housman.

In addition to his love of poetry, Vaughan Williams's vocal music is inspired by his lifelong belief that the voice "can be made the medium of the best and deepest human emotion."

==== Songs ====
Between the mid-1890s and the late 1950s Vaughan Williams set more than eighty poems for voice and piano accompaniment. The earliest to survive is "A Cradle Song", to Coleridge's words, from about 1894. The songs include many that have entered the repertory, such as "Linden Lea" (1902), "Silent Noon" (1904) and the song cycles Songs of Travel (1905 and 1907) and On Wenlock Edge. To Vaughan Williams the human voice was "the oldest and greatest of musical instruments". He described his early songs as "more or less simple and popular in character", and the musicologist Sophie Fuller describes this simplicity and popularity as consistent throughout his career. Many composers of the late 19th and early 20th centuries wrote sentimental works for female voice; by contrast, songs by Vaughan Williams, such as "The Vagabond" from Songs of Travel, to words by Robert Louis Stevenson, are "a particularly masculine breath of fresh air" (Fuller), "virile open-air verses" (Kennedy). Some of Vaughan Williams's later songs are less well known; Fuller singles out the cycle Three Poems by Walt Whitman, a largely dark work, as too often overlooked by singers and critics. For some of his songs the composer expands the accompaniment to include two or more string instruments in addition to the piano; they include On Wenlock Edge, and the Chaucer cycle Merciless Beauty (1921), judged by an anonymous contemporary critic as "surely among the best of modern English songs".

==== Choral music ====
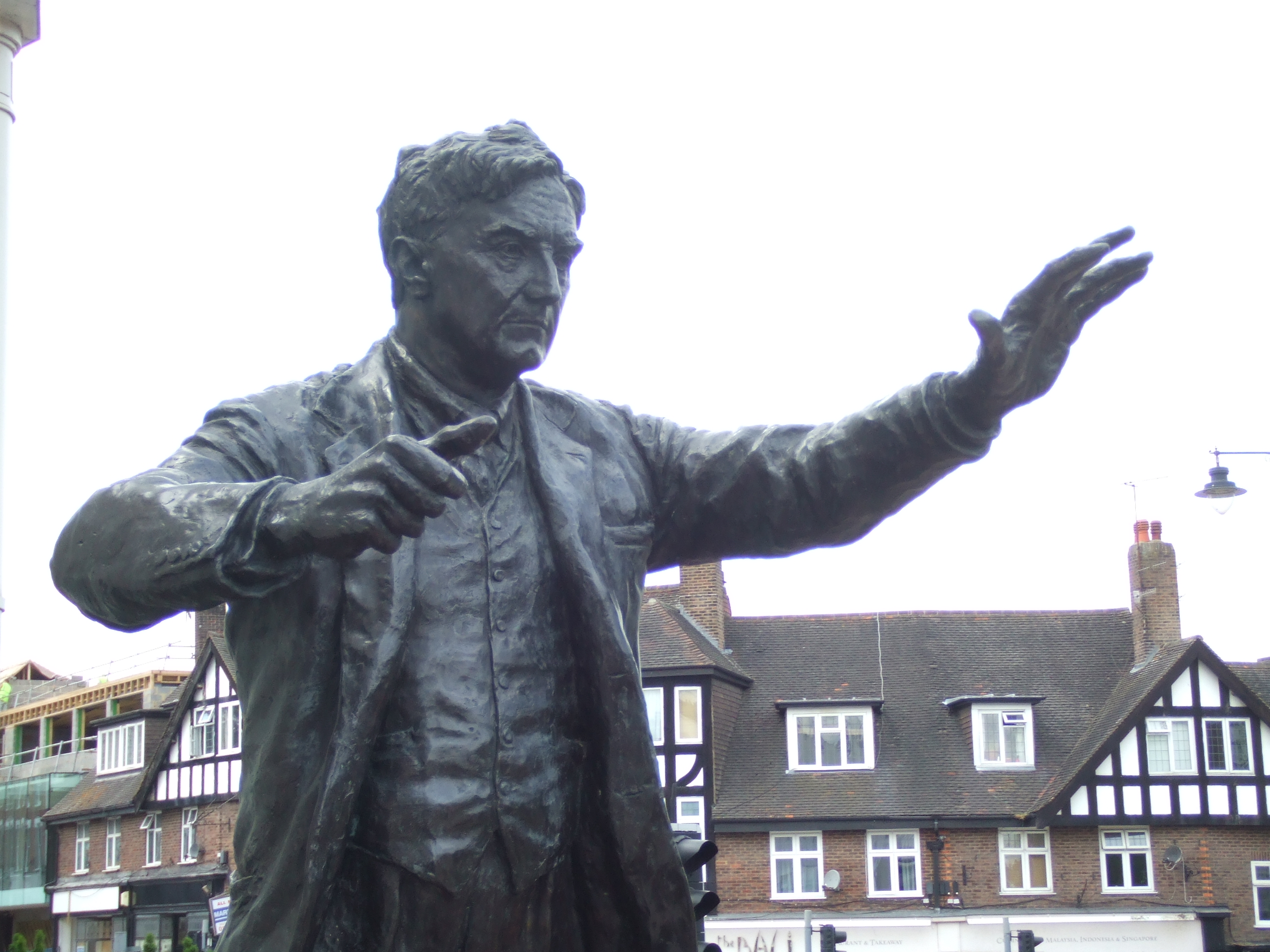
Statue of Vaughan Williams by William Fawke, Dorking

Despite his agnosticism Vaughan Williams composed many works for church performance. His two best known hymn tunes, both from c. 1905, are "Down Ampney" to the words "Come Down, O Love Divine", and "Sine nomine" "For All the Saints". Grove lists a dozen more, composed between 1905 and 1935. Other church works include a Magnificat and Nunc Dimittis (1925), the Mass in G minor (1920–1921), a Te Deum (1928) and the motets O Clap Your Hands (1920), Lord, Thou hast been our Refuge (1921) and O Taste and See (1953). The latter was first performed at the Coronation of Queen Elizabeth II, for which Vaughan Williams also produced an elaborate arrangement of All People that on Earth do Dwell for choir, congregation and orchestra.

Vaughan Williams's choral works for concert performance include settings of both secular and religious words. The former include Toward the Unknown Region to words by Whitman (composed 1904–1906), Five Tudor Portraits, words by John Skelton (1935), and the Shakespearean Serenade to Music (in its alternative version for chorus and orchestra, 1938). Choral pieces with religious words include the oratorio Sancta Civitas (1923–1925) and the Christmas cantata Hodie (1954). In 1953 the composer said that of his choral works Sancta Civitas was his favourite. The Dona Nobis Pacem, an impassioned anti-war cantata (1936) is a combination of both, with words from Whitman and others juxtaposed with extracts from the Latin mass, anticipating a similar mixture of sacred and secular text in Britten's War Requiem twenty-five years later.

=== Stage works ===
Vaughan Williams was wary of conventional labels; his best known ballet is described on the title page as "a masque for dancing" and only one of his operatic works is categorised by the composer simply as an opera. For some of his theatre pieces that could be classed as operas or ballets, he preferred the terms "masque", "romantic extravaganza", "play set to music", or "morality". (Note: Applied by the composer to, respectively, On Christmas Night and The Bridal Day; The Poisoned Kiss, Riders to the Sea and The Pilgrim's Progress.)

In a 2013 survey of Vaughan Williams's stage works, Eric Saylor writes, "With the possible exception of Tchaikovsky, no composer's operatic career was less emblematic of his success elsewhere." Although Vaughan Williams was a regular opera-goer, enthusiastic and knowledgeable about works by operatic masters from Mozart to Wagner and Verdi, his success in the operatic field was at best patchy. There is widespread agreement among commentators that this was partly due to the composer's poor choice of librettists for some, though not all, of his operas. Another problem was his keenness to encourage amateurs and student groups, which sometimes led to the staging of his operas with less than professional standards. A further factor was the composer's expressed preference for "slow, long tableaux", which tended to reduce dramatic impact, although he believed them essential, as "music takes a long time to speak—much longer than words by themselves."

Hugh the Drover, or Love in the Stocks (completed 1919, premiere 1924) has a libretto, by the writer and theatre critic Harold Child, which was described by The Stage as "replete with folksy, Cotswold village archetypes". In the view of the critic Richard Traubner the piece is a cross between traditional ballad opera and the works of Puccini and Ravel, "with rhapsodic results." The score uses genuine and pastiche folk-songs but ends with a passionate love duet that Traubner considers has few equals in English opera. Its first performance was by students at the Royal College of Music, and the work is rarely staged by major professional companies.

Old King Cole (1923) is a humorous ballet. The score, which makes liberal use of folk-song melodies, was thought by critics to be strikingly modern when first heard. Kennedy comments that the music "is not a major work but it is fun." The piece has not been seen frequently since its premiere, but was revived in a student production at the RCM in 1937.

On Christmas Night (1926), a masque by Adolph Bolm and Vaughan Williams, combines singing, dancing and mime. The story is loosely based on Dickens's A Christmas Carol. The piece was first given in Chicago by Bolm's company; the London premiere was in 1935. Saylor describes the work as a "dramatic hodgepodge" which has not attracted the interest of later performers.

The only work that the composer designated as an opera is the comedy Sir John in Love (1924–1928). It is based on Shakespeare's The Merry Wives of Windsor. Folk-song is used, though more discreetly than in Hugh the Drover, and the score is described by Saylor as "ravishingly tuneful". Although versions of the play had already been set by Nicolai, Verdi, and Holst, Vaughan Williams's is distinctive for its greater emphasis on the love music rather than on the robust comedy. In 1931, with the Leith Hill Festival in mind, the composer recast some of the music as a five-section cantata, In Windsor Forest, giving the public "the plums and no cake", as he put it.

The Poisoned Kiss (1927–1929, premiered in 1936) is a light comedy. Vaughan Williams knew the Savoy operas well, and his music for this piece was and is widely regarded as in the Sullivan vein. The words, by an inexperienced librettist, were judged to fall far short of Gilbert's standards. Saylor sums up the critical consensus that the work is something between "a frothy romantic comedy [and] a satirical fairy-tale", and not quite successful in either category.

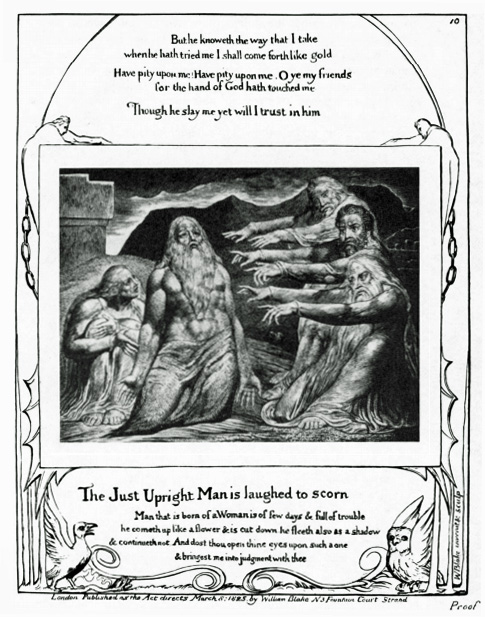
William Blake's engraving of Job and his comforters

Job: A Masque for Dancing (1930) was the first large-scale ballet by a modern British composer. Vaughan Williams's liking for long tableaux, however disadvantageous in his operas, worked to successful effect in this ballet. The work is inspired by William Blake's Illustrations of the Book of Job (1826). The score is divided into nine sections and an epilogue, presenting dance interpretations of some of Blake's engravings. The work, choreographed by Ninette de Valois, made a powerful impression at its early stagings, and has been revived by the Royal Ballet several times. Kennedy ranks the score as "one of Vaughan Williams's mightiest achievements", and notes that it is familiar in concert programmes, having "the stature and cohesion of a symphony."

In Kennedy's view the one-act Riders to the Sea (1925–1931, premiered 1937) is artistically Vaughan Williams's most successful opera; Saylor names Sir John in Love for that distinction, but rates Riders to the Sea as one of the composer's finest works in any genre. It is an almost verbatim setting of J. M. Synge's 1902 play of the same name, depicting family tragedy in an Irish fishing village. Kennedy describes the score as "organized almost symphonically" with much of the thematic material developed from the brief prelude. The orchestration is subtle, and foreshadows the ghostly finale of the Sixth Symphony; there are also pre-echoes of the Sinfonia antartica in the lamenting voices of the women and in the sound of the sea.

The Bridal Day (1938–1939) is a masque, to a scenario by Ursula, combining voice, mime and dance, first performed in 1953 on BBC television. Vaughan Williams later recast it a cantata, Epithalamion (1957).

The Pilgrim's Progress (1951), the composer's last opera, was the culmination of more than forty years' intermittent work on the theme of Bunyan's religious allegory. Vaughan Williams had written incidental music for an amateur dramatisation in 1906, and had returned to the theme in 1921 with the one-act The Shepherds of the Delectable Mountains (finally incorporated, with amendments, into the 1951 opera). The work has been criticised for a preponderance of slow music and stretches lacking in dramatic action, but some commentators believe the work to be one of Vaughan Williams's supreme achievements. Summaries of the music vary from "beautiful, if something of a stylistic jumble" (Saylor) to "a synthesis of Vaughan Williams's stylistic progress over the years, from the pastoral mediation of the 1920s to the angry music of the middle symphonies and eventually the more experimental phase of the Sinfonia antartica in his last decade" (Kennedy).

== Recordings ==
Vaughan Williams conducted a handful of recordings for gramophone and radio. His studio recordings are the overture to The Wasps and the ballet Old King Cole (both made in 1925), and the Fourth Symphony (1937). Live concert tapings include Dona Nobis Pacem (1936), the Serenade to Music, and the Fifth Symphony, recorded in 1951 and 1952, respectively. There is a recording of Vaughan Williams conducting the St Matthew Passion with his Leith Hill Festival forces. In the early days of LP in the 1950s Vaughan Williams was better represented in the record catalogues than most British composers. The Record Guide (1955) contained nine pages of listings of his music on disc, compared with five for Walton, and four apiece for Elgar and Britten.

All the composer's major works and many of the minor ones have been recorded. There have been numerous complete LP and CD sets of the nine symphonies, beginning with Boult's Decca cycle of the 1950s, most of which was recorded in the composer's presence. (Note: The Ninth Symphony in what became the Decca complete cycle was recorded by Everest Records; the sessions took place on the morning after the composer's death. Decca licensed the recording from Everest for inclusion in a CD set of the nine symphonies in 2003.) Although rarely staged, the operas have fared well on disc. The earliest recording of a Vaughan Williams opera was Hugh the Drover, in an abridged version conducted by Sargent in 1924. Since the 1960s there have been stereophonic recordings of Hugh the Drover, Sir John in Love, Riders to the Sea, The Poisoned Kiss, and The Pilgrim's Progress. Most of the orchestral recordings have been by British orchestras and conductors, but notable non-British conductors who have made recordings of Vaughan Williams's works include Herbert von Karajan, Leonard Bernstein, Dimitri Mitropoulos, Charles Munch, Leopold Stokowski, and, most frequently, André Previn, who conducted the London Symphony Orchestra in the first complete stereo cycle of the symphonies, recorded between 1967 and 1972. Among the British conductors most closely associated with Vaughan Williams's music on disc and in concert in the generations after Boult, Sargent and Barbirolli are Vernon Handley, Richard Hickox, Sir Mark Elder and Sir Andrew Davis. Record companies with extensive lists of Vaughan Williams recordings include EMI, Decca, Chandos, Hyperion and Naxos.

== Honours and legacy ==
Vaughan Williams refused a knighthood at least once, and declined the post of Master of the King's Music after Elgar's death. The one state honour he accepted was the Order of Merit in 1935, which confers no prenominal title: he preferred to remain "Dr Vaughan Williams". His academic and musical honours included an honorary doctorate of music from the University of Oxford (1919); the Cobbett medal for services to chamber music (1930); the gold medal of the Royal Philharmonic Society (1930); the Collard life fellowship of the Worshipful Company of Musicians (1934, in succession to Elgar); an honorary fellowship of Trinity College, Cambridge (1935); the Shakespeare prize of the University of Hamburg (1937); the Albert medal of the Royal Society of Arts (1955); and the Howland memorial prize of Yale University (1954).

Although the Shakespeare Prize was awarded to Vaughan Williams in 1937, he travelled to Hamburg to receive it in June 1938; currency restrictions prevented him from taking the 10,000-mark prize money out of Germany.

After Vaughan Williams's death, The Times summed up his legacy in a leading article:

[H]istorically his achievement was to cut the bonds that from the times of Handel and Mendelssohn had bound England hand and foot to the Continent. He found in the Elizabethans and folk-song the elements of a native English language that need no longer be spoken with a German accent, and from it he forged his own idiom. The emancipation he achieved thereby was so complete that the composers of succeeding generations like Walton and Britten had no longer need of the conscious nationalism which was Vaughan Williams's own artistic creed. There is now an English music which can make its distinctive contribution to the comity of nations.

In 1994 a group of enthusiasts founded the Ralph Vaughan Williams Society, with the composer's widow as its president and Roy Douglas and Michael Kennedy as vice presidents. The society, a registered charity, has sponsored and encouraged performances of the composer's works including complete symphony cycles and a Vaughan Williams opera festival. The society has promoted premieres of neglected works, and has its own record label, Albion Records.

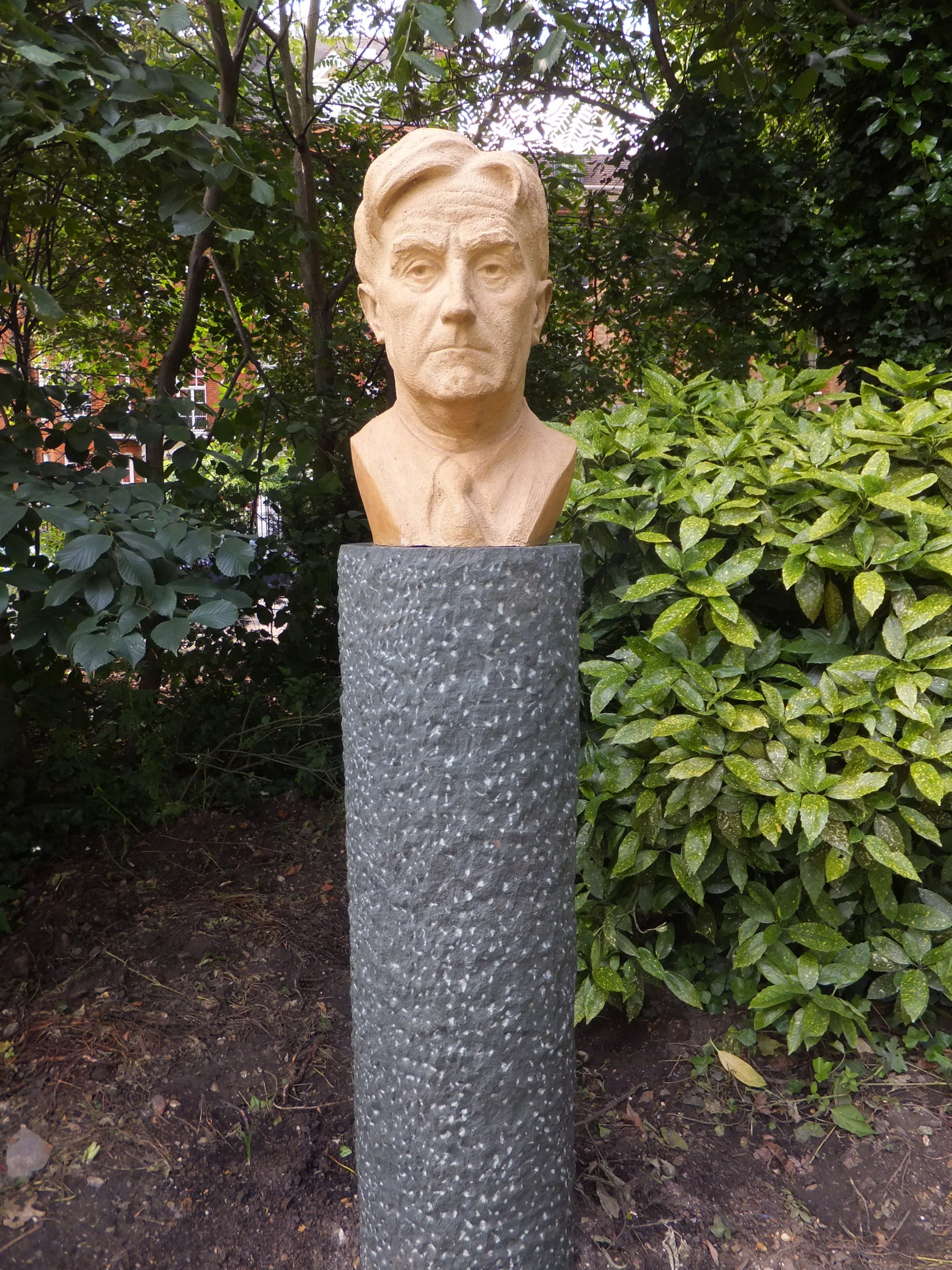
Bust of Vaughan Williams by Marcus Cornish, Chelsea Embankment

Composers of the generation after Vaughan Williams reacted against his style, which became unfashionable in influential musical circles in the 1960s; diatonic and melodic music such as his was neglected in favour of atonal and other modernist compositions. In the 21st century this neglect has been reversed. In the fiftieth anniversary year of his death two contrasting documentary films were released: Tony Palmer's O Thou Transcendent: The Life of Vaughan Williams and John Bridcut's The Passions of Vaughan Williams. British audiences were prompted to reappraise the composer. The popularity of his most accessible works, particularly the Tallis Fantasia and The Lark Ascending, increased, (Note: The British radio station Classic FM, which specialises in popular classics, conducted polls of its listeners in 2014 and 2015 in which The Lark Ascending was voted the most popular of all musical works, and the Tallis Fantasia was in the top three.) but a wide public also became aware of what a reviewer of Bridcut's film called "a genius driven by emotion". Among the 21st-century musicians who have acknowledged Vaughan Williams's influence on their development are John Adams, PJ Harvey, Sir Peter Maxwell Davies, Anthony Payne, Wayne Shorter, Neil Tennant and Mark-Anthony Turnage.

=== Cultural legacy ===
The Royal College of Music commissioned an official portrait of the composer from Sir Gerald Kelly (1952) which hangs in the college. The Manchester Art Gallery has a bronze sculpture of Vaughan Williams by Epstein (1952) and the National Portrait Gallery (NPG) has drawings by Joyce Finzi (1947) and Juliet Pannett (1957 and 1958); versions of a bronze head of the composer by David McFall (1956) are in the NPG and at the entrance to the Music reading room of the British Library. There is a statue of Vaughan Williams in Dorking, and a bust by Marcus Cornish in Chelsea Embankment Gardens, near his old house in Cheyne Walk.

== Notes, references and sources ==
=== Sources ===
- Achenbach, Andrew (August 2008). "Building the ideal RVW library". Gramophone: 40–45.
- Adams, Byron (1996). "Scripture, Church and culture: biblical texts in the works of Ralph Vaughan Williams". In Alain Frogley (ed.). Vaughan Williams Studies. Cambridge: Cambridge University Press. ISBN 978-0-521-48031-4.
- Adams, Byron (2013). "Vaughan Williams's musical apprenticeship". In Alain Frogley and Aidan Thomson (ed.). The Cambridge Companion to Vaughan Williams. Cambridge: Cambridge University Press. ISBN 978-0-521-19768-7.
- Barbirolli, John; Arthur Bliss; Adrian Boult; Norman Demuth; George Dyson; Alun Hoddinott; Herbert Howells; Frank Howes; John Ireland; Michael Kennedy; Steuart Wilson (October 1958). "Tributes to Vaughan Williams". The Musical Times. 99: 535–539. JSTOR 937433. (subscription required)
- Cobbe, Hugh (2010) [2008]. Letters of Ralph Vaughan Williams. Oxford: Oxford University Press. ISBN 978-0-19-958764-3.
- Cox, David (1967). "Ralph Vaughan Williams". In Simpson, Robert (ed.). The Symphony: Elgar to the Present Day. Harmondsworth: Pelican Books. OCLC 221594461.
- Culshaw, John (1981). Putting the Record Straight. London: Secker and Warburg. ISBN 978-0-436-11802-9.
- De Savage, Heather (2013). "Chronology". In Alain Frogley and Aidan Thomson (ed.). The Cambridge Companion to Vaughan Williams. Cambridge: Cambridge University Press. ISBN 978-0-521-19768-7.
- Dibble, Jeremy (2003). Charles Villiers Stanford: Man and Musician. Oxford and New York: Oxford University Press. ISBN 978-0-19-816383-1.
- Foreman, Lewis (1998). Vaughan Williams in Perspective: Studies of an English Composer. Ilminster: Albion Press. ISBN 978-0-9528706-1-6.
- Frogley, Alain (2013). "History and geography: the early orchestral works and first three symphonies". In Alain Frogley and Aidan Thomson (ed.). The Cambridge Companion to Vaughan Williams. Cambridge: Cambridge University Press. ISBN 978-0-521-19768-7.
- Frogley, Alain; Aidan Thomson (2013). "Introduction". In Alain Frogley and Aidan Thomson (ed.). The Cambridge Companion to Vaughan Williams. Cambridge: Cambridge University Press. ISBN 978-0-521-19768-7.
- Fuller, Sophie (2013). "The songs and shorter secular choral works". In Alain Frogley and Aidan Thomson (ed.). The Cambridge Companion to Vaughan Williams. Cambridge: Cambridge University Press. ISBN 978-0-521-19768-7.
- Horton, Julian (2013). "The later symphonies". In Alain Frogley and Aidan Thomson (ed.). The Cambridge Companion to Vaughan Williams. Cambridge: Cambridge University Press. ISBN 978-0-521-19768-7.
- Hughes, Gervase (1962). Composers of Operetta. London: Macmillan. OCLC 1828913.
- Kennedy, Michael (1980) [1964]. The Works of Ralph Vaughan Williams (second ed.). Oxford: Oxford University Press. ISBN 978-0-19-315453-7.
- Kennedy, Michael (1989). Portrait of Walton. Oxford: Oxford University Press. ISBN 978-0-19-816705-1.
- Kennedy, Michael (1997) [1993]. "Ralph Vaughan Williams". In Amanda Holden (ed.). The Penguin Opera Guide. London: Penguin. ISBN 978-0-14-051385-1.
- Kennedy, Michael (August 2008). "The Vaughan Williams Identity". Gramophone: 36–39.
- Kennedy, Michael (2013). "Fluctuations in the response to the music of Ralph Vaughan Williams". In Alain Frogley and Aidan Thomson (ed.). The Cambridge Companion to Vaughan Williams. Cambridge: Cambridge University Press. ISBN 978-0-521-19768-7.
- Manning, David (2008). Vaughan Williams on Music. Oxford and New York: Oxford University Press. ISBN 978-0-19-518239-2.
- March, Ivan; Edward Greenfield; Robert Layton; Paul Czajkowski (2008). The Penguin Guide to Recorded Classical Music 2009. London: Penguin. ISBN 978-0-141-03335-8.
- Mark, Christopher (2013). "Chamber music and works for soloist with orchestra". In Alain Frogley and Aidan Thomson (ed.). The Cambridge Companion to Vaughan Williams. Cambridge: Cambridge University Press. ISBN 978-0-521-19768-7.
- McGuire, Charles Edward (2013). "'An Englishman and a democrat': Vaughan Williams, large choral works and the English festival tradition". In Alain Frogley and Aidan Thomson (ed.). The Cambridge Companion to Vaughan Williams. Cambridge: Cambridge University Press. ISBN 978-0-521-19768-7.
- McVeagh, Diana (1986). Twentieth-century English Masters. London: Macmillan. ISBN 978-0-333-40242-9.
- Moore, Jerrold Northrop (1992). Vaughan Williams: A Life in Photographs. Oxford: Oxford University Press. ISBN 978-0-19-816296-4.
- Neighbour, Oliver (August 2008). "Ralph, Adeline, and Ursula Vaughan Williams: Some Facts and Speculation". Music & Letters. 89 (3): 337–345. doi:10.1093/ml/gcn042. JSTOR 30162996. (subscription required)
- Nichols, Roger (1987). Ravel Remembered. London: Faber and Faber. ISBN 978-0-571-14986-5.
- Onderdonk, Julian (2013). "1. The composer and society: family, politics, nation". In Alain Frogley and Aidan Thomson (ed.). The Cambridge Companion to Vaughan Williams. Cambridge: Cambridge University Press. pp. 9–28. ISBN 978-0-521-19768-7.
- Ottaway, Hugh (July 1957). "Vaughan Williams's Eighth Symphony". Music & Letters. 38 (3): 213–225. doi:10.1093/ml/xxxviii.3.213. JSTOR 730270. (subscription required)
- Roach, Emma (2002). Gramophone Classical Good CD Guide 2003. Teddington: Gramophone Company. ISBN 978-1-876871-98-7.
- Sackville-West, Edward; Desmond Shawe-Taylor (1955). The Record Guide. London: Collins. OCLC 474839729.
- Saylor, Eric (2013). "Music for stage and film". In Alain Frogley and Aidan Thomson (ed.). The Cambridge Companion to Vaughan Williams. Cambridge: Cambridge University Press. ISBN 978-0-521-19768-7.
- Schwartz, Elliott (1982) [1964]. The Symphonies of Ralph Vaughan Williams. New York: Da Capo Press. ISBN 978-0-306-76137-9.
- Steinberg, Michael (2005). Choral Masterworks: A Listener's Guide. Oxford and New York: Oxford University Press. ISBN 978-0-19-512644-0.
- Stonehouse, Roger; Gerhard Stromberg (2004). The Architecture of the British Library at St Pancras. London and New York: Spon Press. ISBN 978-0-419-25120-0.
- Thomson, Aidan (2013). "Becoming a national composer: critical reception to c.1925". In Alain Frogley and Aidan Thomson (ed.). The Cambridge Companion to Vaughan Williams. Cambridge: Cambridge University Press. ISBN 978-0-521-19768-7.
- Thomson, Aidan; Peter Maxwell Davies; Piers Hellawell; Nicola LeFanu; Anthony Payne (2013). "Vaughan Williams and his successors: composers' forum". In Alain Frogley and Aidan Thomson (ed.). The Cambridge Companion to Vaughan Williams. Cambridge: Cambridge University Press. ISBN 978-0-521-19768-7.
- Vaughan Williams, Ursula (1965) [1964]. RVW: A Biography of Ralph Vaughan Williams. Oxford: Oxford University Press. ISBN 978-0-19-315411-7.
- Vaughan Williams, Ursula (1972–1973). "Ralph Vaughan Williams and his Choice of Words for Music". Proceedings of the Royal Musical Association: 81–89. JSTOR 766156. (subscription required)
- Weltzien, O. Alan (Autumn 1992). "Notes and Lineaments: Vaughan Williams's Job: A Masque for Dancing and Blake's Illustrations". The Musical Quarterly. 76 (3): 301–336. doi:10.1093/mq/76.3.301. JSTOR 742481. (subscription required)
