= Classic Rock (disambiguation) =

Classic rock is a radio format which plays popular rock music particularly from the late 1960s onward.

Classic Rock may also refer to:

- Classic Rock (Time-Life Music)
- Classic Rock series, album series by the London Symphony Orchestra and the Royal Choral Society
- Classic Rock (album), by the London Symphony Orchestra
- Classic Rock (magazine), a British magazine
- Classic Rock (Australian radio network)
- Classic Rock (Dial Global radio network), a U.S.-based radio music format
- Classic Rock (Westwood One), a U.S.-based radio music format
- Arena Rock, the musical genre commonly referred to as classic rock

== See also ==
- Classical rock, progressive rock
