= Tom Brislin =

Musical artist (born 1973)

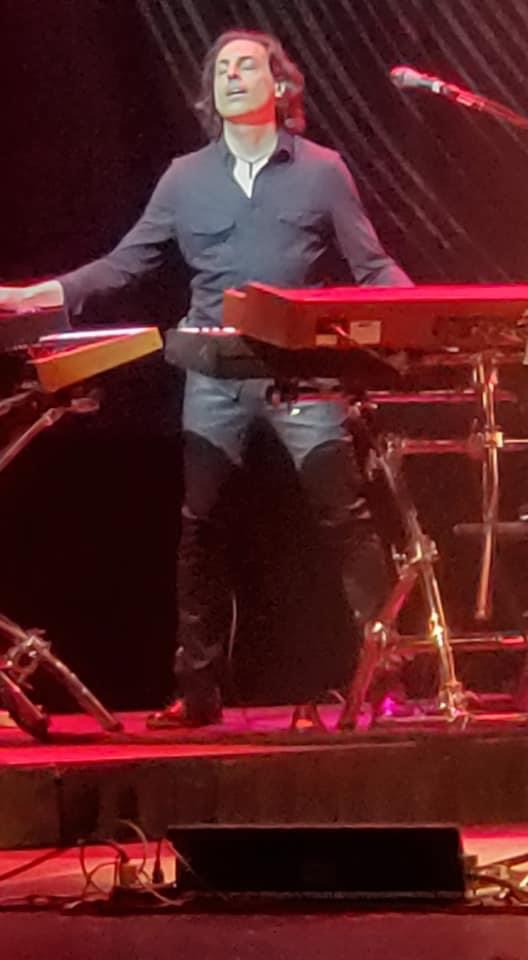

Background information
- Born: October 5, 1973 (age 53); New Jersey, United States
- Occupations: Keyboardist, songwriter, singer, producer, writer
- Instruments: Piano; keyboards; percussion; vocals
- Website: tombrislin.com

Tom Brislin (born October 5, 1973) is an American keyboardist, songwriter, singer, producer, and author. In December 2018, American progressive rock band Kansas announced Brislin as the group’s keyboardist; his playing, vocals, and prominent songwriting contributions are featured on the band’s most recently released studio album, The Absence of Presence (2020).

== Biography ==
Early Life

Brislin was born and raised in New Jersey, the youngest of five children in a musically inclined household in Dunellen, New Jersey. His older siblings provided his first exposure to music, which consisted of album-oriented 1970s rock acts such as Foreigner, Yes, and Led Zeppelin. As a young piano student in the 1980s, he drew inspiration from pop acts such as Prince, Men At Work, Duran Duran, and The Police, as well as keyboardists like Keith Emerson and Herbie Hancock. Brislin formed his first bands with childhood friends at the age of 10; by 12, he had cemented his aspiration to be a professional musician.

Education

Brislin graduated from Immaculata High School in Somerville, New Jersey, and was inducted into the school’s hall of fame in 2016. He went on to study classical and jazz piano performance at William Paterson University under the tutelage of notable musicians Harold Mabern, Norman Simmons, Rufus Reid, and others. During this period, Brislin performed in a variety of venues and styles, ranging from solo piano, jazz quartets, rock bands, church music, and dance bands.

Late 90s-2001

As an undergraduate at William Paterson, he formed a recording project with fellow student musicians which evolved into the live band You Were Spiraling. With Brislin as frontman, keyboardist, and songwriter, the group performed throughout the New York City metro area and toured nationwide as a supporting act for They Might Be Giants throughout the late 90s and early ‘00s. Brislin produced 3 recordings with You Were Spiraling, including a self-titled EP distributed via the Hello Recording Club (a subscription record label launched by TMBG’s John Flansburgh) in 1997.

In 1996, Brislin also played keyboards for fellow New Jersey resident Glen Burtnik (formerly of Styx). Burtnik connected Brislin with Meat Loaf (through musical director Kasim Sulton), which led to him joining the singer's band as keyboardist for three years (1998-2001). His tenure with Meat Loaf encompassed concert tours of Europe, the United Kingdom, and the US, as well as numerous television appearances, including The Tonight Show with Jay Leno, The Late Show with David Letterman, and a 1999 episode of VH1 Storytellers. Brislin’s piano work is featured on the artist’s 2003 album, Couldn’t Have Said It Better.

During this period, Brislin released 30 Day Keyboard Workout, published by Alfred Music in 1999. Positive reviews for the book in Keyboard magazine led to his contributing a monthly column entitled “Keyboard Basics” and working for the publication as a senior correspondent and contributing editor from 2001-2014.

Prog Rock Notoriety & Spiraling (2001-2009)

In July 2001, Brislin came to notoriety within the progressive rock sphere as keyboardist for Yes, joining them on their YesSymphonic tour in support of their nineteenth studio album, Magnification. The tour covered North America and Europe, and ran from July to December 2001. Two performances featuring Brislin on keyboards were recorded at Heineken Music Hall in Amsterdam and released as the 2002 DVD and 2009 CD Symphonic Live.

As his time with Yes and Meat Loaf concluded, Brislin resumed the helm of You Were Spiraling. The group solidified its longest-lasting four member lineup (with Marty O'Kane on guitar, Bob Hart on bass, and Paul Wells on drums) and shortened its name to Spiraling in 2002.

The band independently released its first full-length album, Transmitter, in 2002. The New York Times praised the album for “show[ing] off [Brislin’s] talents on synthesizer in 80's-flavored modern rock numbers like ''The Girl on Top of the Piano'' and ''Lightning Twice.''” As the album gained traction with national college and commercial radio airplay, The Aquarian Weekly hailed the Transmitter as “an instant classic.” In support of the album, Spiraling played to nationwide audiences, often as an opening band for acts such as OK Go, They Might Be Giants, and The Violent Femmes.

Through his work with Yes and Keyboard magazine, Brislin was drafted as the keyboardist for English progressive rock band Camel for select dates of their Farewell Tour, with Spiraling as support act on selected dates. Brislin’s time with Camel culminated in the band’s headlining performance at NearFest 2003.

In 2004, Brislin was a member of the house band featured on the pilot of John McEnroe’s short-lived CNBC talk show, McEnroe. The episode also included bandmates Glen Burtnik and Patti Smyth, with guest star Sting lending backing vocals to the group.

In August 2004, Spiraling released its sophomore recording effort, Challenging Stage, marking its launch at Starland Ballroom in Sayreville, New Jersey. The album was listed as the #1 indie album of the year by multiple press outlets, including Upstage Magazine, The Courier News, and Aquarian Weekly.

Brislin spent 2007 serving as musical director and keyboardist for Deborah Harry during her supporting turn in Cyndi Lauper’s True Colors concert series, followed by her own headlining Necessary Evil concert tour, both encompassing North America. Spiraling alums Hart, Wells, and guitarist J.P. Doherty collectively joined Brislin on the road as Harry’s backing band.

Spiraling’s 2008 album, Time Travel Made Easy, was to be the band’s swan song to date. The Daily Vault praised TTME’s “audacious” directive of “[capturing] an audience with an extended narrative of...pop songs”, describing it as “a fairly aggressively uncommercial album, full of smart, challenging...ideas that force the listener to...think and appreciate the larger vision of the artist.” The band quietly disbanded months after the album was released. While they did regroup to play a handful of benefit shows, no formal announcement of the band’s breakup was made. Brislin continues to play material written for Spiraling in his solo live shows.

Brislin began the latter half of 2008 as a member of the reformed lineup of prog rock outfit The Syn. His stint with the band ran through recording one studio album, Big Sky, and a brief US tour that ended with The Syn’s performance at Rosfest on May 1, 2009. Brislin subsequently went on to perform with Syn bandmate Francis Dunnery, appearing as pianist/keyboardist on Dunnery’s 2009 double disc release, There’s A Whole New World Out There. On November 6, 2009, Brislin and the members of Dunnery’s band shared the stage with Robert Plant at The Walls, Owestry, UK.

In 2009, progressive rock band Renaissance announced Brislin as a member of its new lineup for their 40th anniversary commemorative tour, filling the role of recreating the orchestral element the band had gradually infused into its style. He toured with this incarnation of Renaissance throughout 2010, then returned to the band from the fall 2014 to the spring of 2016.

Solo in Nashville (2010-2013)

After relocating to Nashville in 2010, Brislin wrote and recorded his debut solo album, 2012’s Hurry Up and Smell the Roses, which he independently funded through a successful Kickstarter campaign. The album, which Brislin describes as "Cinematic Pop", was written, produced, performed, and recorded by Brislin, and features guest contributions from guitarist and platinum songwriter Clint Lagerberg, vocalist Annie Haslam of Renaissance, and Theremin synthesist Shueh-li Ong. In 2013, the album was released in Japan on Powerpop Academy/Thistime Records. A vinyl edition of the album was released at the end of 2013 on the Plane Groovy label.

Around the World (2014-mid 2018)

Brislin spent a portion of 2014 as a guest faculty member at the Swarnabhoomi Academy of Music outside of Chennai, India. In 2015, he traveled to Sweden to play keyboard for the Jon Anderson (Yes)/ Roine Stolt (Flower Kings) collaborative album Invention of Knowledge.

He briefly rejoined Meat Loaf’s band on tour in 2016, filling in on piano/vocals for Justin Avery. Later that year, he co-founded a program called Accessing Music Promoting Success with musician/occupational therapist Karen Kowalski. As technology director of the project, he and Kowalski developed a system for individuals with disabilities which provides an adaptive, high-tech system that allows them to successfully play music and engage with others, regardless of experience, training, or ability.

In April 2017, Brislin announced that he would be joining ex-Styx frontman Dennis DeYoung for a handful of shows, filling in for John Blasucci.

That same year, Roine Stolt and Jonas Reingold (also of The Flower Kings) both approached Brislin with the idea of forming a group. The trio had previously worked together in the studio for Anderson/Stolt’s 2015 release Invention of Knowledge. With the addition of singer Daniel Gildenlöw (of Pain of Salvation) and drummer Marco Minnemann, The Sea Within formally announced its formation in December 2017. Their self-titled debut album was recorded in Livingston Studios in North London and released by InsideOut records in the spring of 2018. The band’s inaugural performance took place at Night of the Prog in Lorelei, Germany on July 14, 2018. The self-described “art rock collective” also shared billing with Yes and Steve Hackett on Cruise to the Edge in early 2019.

In 2018, Brislin began a songwriting collaboration with a handpicked group of musicians, including Randy McStine (guitar, bass, vocals, Daniel McGowan (guitar, vocals), Rajendra Sharma (drums), and David Anthony (percussion). That October, the newly formed group took the stage at ProgStock under the name Gold Rotation, performing songs from Brislin’s solo album as well as a selection of newly composed material.

Kansas (Late 2018–Present)

After seeing him perform with The Sea Within at Night of the Prog in July 2018, InsideOut label head Thomas Waber recommended Brislin to American rock band Kansas as a replacement for departing keyboardist David Manion. Months later, Kansas drummer Phil Ehart asked him to join the band. Kansas officially announced Brislin’s addition to their current lineup on December 19, 2018. His first performance as a member of Kansas took place on the Rock Legends Cruise in February 2019, after which Kansas resumed its Point of Know Return Anniversary Tour.

Brislin’s lyric, compositional, and vocal contributions figure heavily in his studio debut with Kansas, 2020’s The Absence of Presence, with writing credits on seven of the album’s nine songs and a turn at lead vocals on the album’s closing track, “The Song The River Sang.” According to American Songwriter Magazine online, The Absence of Presence “takes the band even further into the progressive rock arena while still maintaining the classic Kansas sound.” The album reached the following positions on various Billboard Charts: Album Sales, #10; Current Album Sales, #10; Tastemakers, #12; Independent Albums, #32; Rock Albums, #31; Germany Albums, #7.

On May 28, 2021, Kansas released their sixth live album, Point of Know Return Live & Beyond. The album features 22 songs selected from 12 shows recorded in 2019 and 2020 during Kansas’s Point of Know Return Anniversary Tour, Brislin’s first tour with the band.

Kansas resumed their touring schedule on July 30, 2021 in Maumee, Ohio. Their Woodstock, Illinois show on August 7, 2021, marked Brislin’s 100th live performance as a member of the group. They are currently scheduled to tour the United States throughout 2022.

Brislin appeared with Kansas on an episode of The CW’s Walker, which aired on April 14, 2022.

On December 9, 2022, the three disc compilation Another Fork In The Road - 50 Years Of Kansas was released to commemorate the band's 50th anniversary in 2023. Included on it are various tracks from all 16 Kansas studio albums, and features a new 2022 recording of "Can I Tell You", co-produced by Brislin, Phil Ehart, and Richard Williams.

On June 2, 2023, Kansas began their 50th Anniversary Tour "Another Fork in the Road", continuing through 2024. Starting with this tour, Brislin was named the band's Musical Director in addition to keyboardist/vocalist.

== Discography ==
=== As solo artist ===
- 2011 Steppin' Out (single)
- 2012 Hurry Up and Smell the Roses (album)
- 2020 Sanitize Your Phone and Remote Control (single)

=== With You Were Spiraling ===
- 1994 You Were Spiraling
- 1997 Hello Recording Club CD
- 1999 Delusions Of Grandeur

=== With Spiraling ===
- 2002 Transmitter
- 2004 Challenging Stage (EP)
- 2005 Do You Hear What I Hear? (single)
- 2008 Time Travel Made Easy

=== With Meat Loaf ===
- 1999 VH1: Storytellers (CD, DVD, and VHS)
- 1999 Is Nothing Sacred (single)
- 2003 Couldn't Have Said It Better

=== With Yes ===
- 2002 Symphonic Live (DVD/VHS/CD)
- 2002 Magnification (reissue)

=== With Kansas ===
- 2020 The Absence of Presence
- 2021 Point of Know Return Live & Beyond
- 2022 Another Fork in the Road - 50 Years of Kansas

=== With other artists ===
- 2001 Patti Rothberg - Candelabra Cadabra
- 2002 Patti Rothberg - Snow Is My Downfall (EP)
- 2005 Camel - Footage II (DVD)
- 2009 The Syn - Big Sky
- 2009 Francis Dunnery and The New Progressives - There's a Whole New World Out There
- 2010 Renaissance - The Mystic and The Muse (EP)
- 2010 The Tea Club - Rabbit
- 2010 Camel - The Opening Farewell (DVD)
- 2011 Josh Kelley - Georgia Clay
- 2015 The Syn - Live Rosfest
- 2016 Anderson/Stolt – Invention of Knowledge
- 2018 The Sea Within - The Sea Within
