= Syndestructible =

Studio album by The Syn
- Released: 31 October 2005
- Recorded: Metropolis, London
- Genre: Progressive rock, psychedelic rock
- Label: Umbrello
- Producer: Paul Stacey, Gerard Johnson

The Syn chronology
Original Syn (2004)	Syndestructible (2005)

Syndestructible is a studio album by The Syn, released in 2005 on Umbrello Records.

== Track listing ==
1. "Breaking Down Walls" (Nardelli, Squire, P. Stacey) - 0:52
2. "Some Time, Some Way" (Nardelli, Squire, P. Stacey, Johnson) - 7:56
3. "Reach Outro" (Nardelli, Squire, P. Stacey, Johnson) - 3:38
4. "Cathedral of Love" (Nardelli, Squire, Johnson, Hamish Brewer) - 8:58
5. "City of Dreams" (Nardelli, Squire) - 9:38
6. "Golden Age" (Nardelli, Squire) - 8:07
7. "The Promise" (Nardelli, Squire, P. Stacey, Johnson) - 13:26

== Personnel ==
Personnel adapted from Syndestructible liner notes.

The Syn

- Steve Nardelli - lead vocals
- Chris Squire - bass guitar, backing vocals
- Paul Stacey - guitar, backing vocals
- Gerard Johnson - keyboards, backing vocals
- Jeremy Stacey - drums

== Production ==
- Paul Stacey - production, mixing, engineering
- Gerard Johnson - production
- Chris Harrison - assistant production
- Jamie Selway - assistant production
- Henry Philpotts - assistant production
- Ian Cooper - mastering
