= Faking =

Faking may refer to:

== Music ==
- Miming in instrumental performance (pretending to play an instrument)
- Faking (Western classical music) (pretending to play a difficult section of orchestral music)
- Lip-synching (pretending to sing in a concert)
- Backing track (using pre-recorded music in a live show)
- Faking (jazz) (providing improvised accompaniment in jazz)

== Other contexts ==
- Fake news
- Fake orgasm
- Poseur (a person pretending to be part of a subculture)
- Charlatan (a person pretending to be a member of a certain profession)

== See also ==
- Fake (disambiguation)
- Fakir
