= Miming guitar =

Miming guitar may refer to:

- Air guitar, pretending to play a guitar without holding a real instrument
- Miming in instrumental performance, pretending to play a real instrument
