= Fako (disambiguation) =

Fako is the highest point in Cameroon.

Fako or FAKO may also refer to:

- Fako (department), a department in the Southwest Region of Cameroon
- FAKO score

== See also ==
- Fake (disambiguation)
