= Faker =

Faker may refer to:

== People ==
- Charlatan, someone who fakes
- Poseur, someone who poses for effect
- Faker (gamer), the in-game name of Korean professional League of Legends player Lee Sang-Hyeok (born 1996)
- Faker (Masters of the Universe), fictional character from the Masters of the Universe franchise

== Arts ==
- The Faker, 1929 American silent film
- Faker (band), Australian alternative rock band formed in Sydney in 1996
- Faker (comics), Vertigo imprint comic book published by DC Comics

== See also ==
- Chet Faker (Nicholas James Murphy, born 1988), Australian musician
- Fakir (disambiguation)
- Fake (disambiguation)
- Faking (disambiguation)
