= Transmitter (album) =

Studio album by Spiraling
- Released: 2002
- Recorded: 2002
- Genre: rock
- Label: Brizmuzik
- Producer: Tom Brislin

Transmitter is the first studio album by American rock band Spiraling. It was released in 2002 as a self release by the group. Reviewed on CD Baby as "the best new pop record I have heard in years. Spiraling plays high-energy, rocking pop songs with delicious vocals and awesome lyrics that are damn near impossible not to sing along to."

== Personnel ==
- Tom Brislin: keyboards, vocals
- Bob Hart: bass guitar, track 1, 3, 4, 6-12
- Nicholas D'Amato: bass guitar, track 2, 5
- Marty O'Kane: guitar, track 5, 7
- J.P. Doherty: guitar, track 1-4, 6-12
- Paul Wells: drums, track 1-3, 5-10, 12
- Rajendra Sharma: drums, track 4
- Tim Metz: drums, track 11
- Sylvia Mincewicz: violin, track 11

== Track listing ==
1. "The Connection"
2. "The Girl On Top (Of the Piano)"
3. "(I Don't Want To) Grow Up"
4. "This Is the Road"
5. "Transmitter"
6. "Lightning Twice"
7. "Living Proof"
8. "The "L" Word III"
9. "Too Good to be True"
10. "Today is the Last Day I Fixate on Your Shape"
11. "Your Excellent Body"
12. "(Get Your Own) Holy Grail"
