= Jonathan Wolfson =

American television producer and artist manager

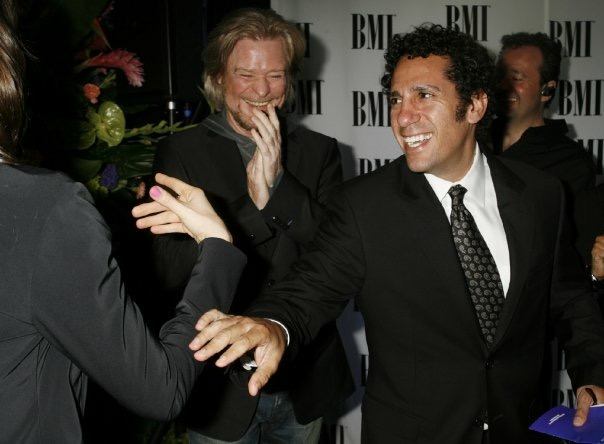
- Jonathan Wolfson (right) and Daryl Hall (left) at the 2008 BMI Awards at the Regent Beverly Wilshire Hotel in Los Angeles, photographed by Fred Prouser
- Born: December 1, 1970 (age 55); Spring Valley, New York, U.S.
- Occupations: Television producer; manager; publicist
- Years active: 1994–present

Jonathan Wolfson (born December 1, 1970) is an American artist manager and television executive. He operates Wolfson Entertainment (previously Wolfson Public Relations).

== Early life and education ==
Jonathan Wolfson was born in Spring Valley, New York, on December 1, 1970, and attended Northeastern University in Boston. In 1994, he moved to Los Angeles.

== Career ==
Wolfson became an apprentice to publicist Lee Solters who later promoted him to working in the music department. After working with Solters, Wolfson created Wolfson Public Relations, a publicity firm.

=== Wolfson Public Relations ===
Wolfson signed record executive Marion “Suge” Knight and his record label Death Row Records for publicity services to Wolfson Public Relations after a personal visit to the hip-hop mogul in Mule Creek State Prison in 2000.

Wolfson's past clientele includes Suge Knight, The Doors, 3 Doors Down, Godsmack, Yanni, Dirty Heads, Everlast, Tonic, Afroman, Peter Noone, Big Tymers, Beth Hart, Nick Lachey of 98 Degrees, Toto, Blue October, YES, The Syn, T-Pain, Wu-Tang Clan, DMX, The Ventures, Vic Mizzy, Motown’s 50th Anniversary, SRC/Loud Records founder Steve Rifkind in addition to Cash Money’s Bryan “Birdman” Williams and Ronald “Slim” Williams.

=== Wolfson Entertainment ===
The company began managing artists in 2009 with Hall & Oates as its first act after doing publicity for the duo for five years at Wolfson PR. Loverboy, a Canadian band from Calgary, Alberta was the next group to sign to its management department. Present clients of Wolfson Entertainment are Hall, Loverboy, Howard Jones, The Tubes, Eric Hutchinson, and Wang Chung. Wolfson represented Huey Lewis & The News to promote their album “Weather” in 2020.

=== Executive producer ===
Daryl Hall’s music series, Live From Daryl’s House, is executive produced by both Hall and Wolfson. The show is centered on jam sessions featuring Hall performing with various artists he invites to the show, which originated at his home in Millerton, New York in 2007. Since 2007, it has broadcast over 90 episodes online and on television. The series aired on MTV Live (formerly Palladia) for over six years. In April 2020, the series began airing on AXS-TV. The series returned after a five-year hiatus in November 2023 and now airs on Daryl Hall's Youtube channel. Wolfson co-executive produced the DIY Network show, “Daryl’s Restoration Over-Hall”, which aired and ran for a season in 2014.

On April 5, 2018, Variety announced that Live Nation had acquired Wolfson Entertainment. The company, now under Artist Nation (part of Live Nation) is still run by Jonathan Wolfson.

== Personal life ==
Wolfson lives in Los Angeles and is married with two children.
