= Miming in pop music =

Miming in pop music may refer to:

- Lip-syncing, matching lip movements with sung or spoken vocals
- Miming in instrumental performance, pretending to play an instrument during a pop concert
