= Alphabet City (disambiguation) =

Alphabet City may refer to:

- Alphabet City, Manhattan, a neighborhood in New York City
- Alphabet City (album), a 1987 album by the band ABC
- Alphabet City (film), a 1984 crime drama film directed by Amos Poe
- Alphabet City, a song by Clare and the Reasons off of their 2007 album, The Movie.
