= April Smith and the Great Picture Show =

American folk rock/indie pop group

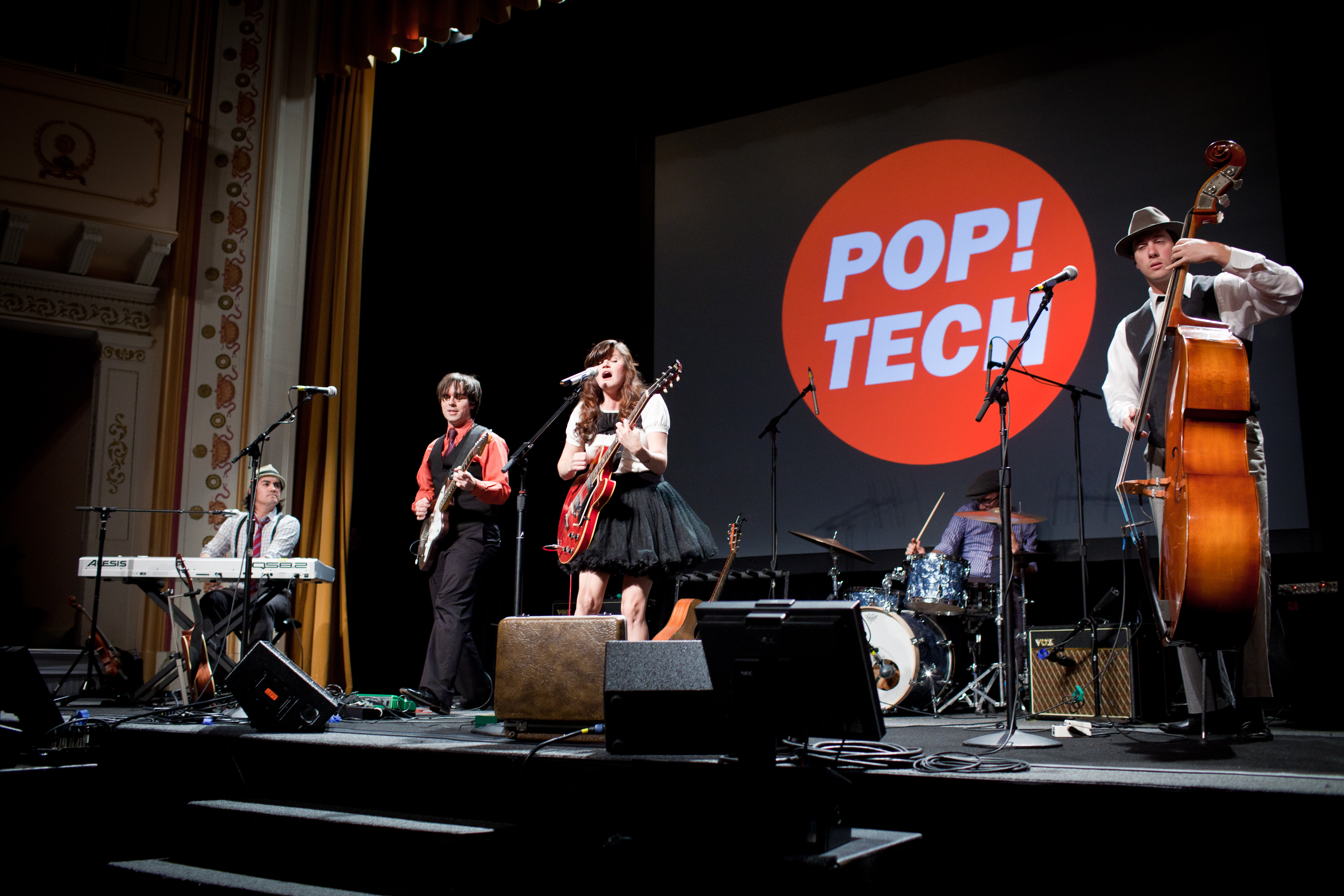
- April Smith and The Great Picture Show performing in 2010

Background information
- Origin: Folk rock, indie pop
- Years active: 2009–present
- Label: Independent
- Members: April Smith; Stevens; Marty O’Kane; Ray Malo; Nick D’Agostino
- Website: http://www.aprilsmithmusic.com/

April Smith and the Great Picture Show are an American folk rock/indie pop group from Brooklyn, New York. The group won Best Pop/Rock Song at the 8th Annual Independent Music Awards for their song "Colors".

== Discography ==
- Loveletterbombs (2005)
- Live from the Penthouse (2008)
- Songs for a Sinking Ship (2010)

== Songs for a Sinking Ship ==
In 2010, the band released their first studio album, "Songs for a Sinking Ship". This album was funded by fans through the website Kickstarter. "Drop Dead Gorgeous", from the album, was featured on Amazon.com's Top 100 Songs of 2010 List.

== Television appearances ==
A number of April Smith and the Great Picture Show's songs have been used in television promotions and episodes. "Terrible Things" from "Songs for a Sinking Ship" was used in a promo for the third season of the Showtime series Californication. The song was also used during the end credits for an episode of Weeds, as well as promo for the series' sixth season. Music from the same album also appeared on the shows "Introducing: Fresh on the Net" on BBC 6, and "Fearless Music". "Can't Say No" from "Songs for a Sinking Ship" appeared in an episode of the 10th season of American Idol. "Colors" from "Songs for a Sinking Ship" was used in a 2012 commercial for Lowe's Valspar Paint products and featured in the movie The Perfect Family. "Movie Loves a Screen" from "Songs for a Sinking Ship" appeared in a commercial for Pandora and Nescafe. "Movie Loves a Screen" was also featured in an episode of ABC Family's "Switched at Birth". A cover of the Lesley Gore song "You Don't Own Me" performed by the band was featured in an NFL commercial airing in 2010 and 2011. "Wow and Flutter" was used in a 2010 Colgate Wisps commercial.

== Other appearances ==
"Colors" from "Songs for a Sinking Ship" was used in episode 457:Why Pink? of NPR's Planet Money podcast, released in early May, about how trends are picked up and used in clothing - specifically the colors chosen for the Planet Money t-shirts offered through their Kickstarter page.
