= Spiraling (band) =

American pop rock band

Spiraling is a New Jersey–based pop-rock quartet. The band was formed out of a previous incarnation called You Were Spiraling by keyboardist/vocalist Tom Brislin.

Spiraling gained national exposure with its self-produced independent release Transmitter. Critical and popular response to the album was enthusiastic. The Star-Ledger of Newark hailed, "There isn't a dull moment on the band's self-released, immaculately produced debut album Transmitter." It also attracted the attention of The New York Times, among a host of other national publications. It is difficult to pigeonhole the group's dynamic, synth-infused modern rock sound.

The band has performed with marquee acts such as OK Go, They Might Be Giants, Violent Femmes, and Rooney at various venues. In 2007, Brislin toured with Deborah Harry during the True Colors tour, and Spiraling was the whole band for Harry's Necessary Evil tour. Spiraling regularly plays at Glen Burtnik's XMAS Xtravaganza, performing "Nutrocker" and "Do You Hear What I Hear". At the 2007 Xtravanganza, they also played "Feliz Navidad" with Harry singing.

Brislin has toured with progressive-rock legends Yes, as well as behind the operatic-rock of Meat Loaf, holding his own with these music veterans and gaining acceptance from both acts' devoted followings. He now is a member of Kansas, with writing credits on their new album The Absence of Presence.

== Members ==
- Tom Brislin – keyboards and vocals
- Bob Hart – bass
- Marty O'Kane – guitar
- Paul Wells – drums

== Discography ==
- 2002 Transmitter
- 2004 Challenging Stage
- 2004 Spiraling Live in New York City
- 2008 Time Travel Made Easy
- 2011 Spiraling Live at Maxwell's 12/17/2004
