= Andrew Pryce Jackman =

English keyboardist, arranger and composer

Andrew Pryce Jackman (13 July 1946 – 16 August 2003) was an English keyboardist, arranger and composer who worked with many leading figures in British popular music. His most successful project was as the arranger and conductor of the Classic Rock series of albums by the London Symphony Orchestra, the first of which reached No 3 in the charts in 1978.

== Career ==
Jackman began his music career as the keyboard player in The Selfs, a rhythm and blues band formed in 1964 in Wembley, London, also featuring bassist Chris Squire (later of Yes) and drummer Martyn Adelman. The Selfs amalgamated with another band, The Syn, in 1965, led by Steve Nardelli. Nardelli and Jackman became the main songwriters for the band. The Syn broke up in 1967.

Jackman went on to concentrate on making orchestral and other arrangements for various bands, such as Peter Skellern (including the distinctive arrangement for brass band and chorus for the 1972 hit You're a Lady), The Congregation, Rush (Power Windows) and Barclay James Harvest (string arrangement for Guitar Blues). He continued to work with Chris Squire, providing arrangements and pianos on his Fish Out of Water (1975) album, providing an orchestral arrangement for the Squire-penned 'Onward' on the Yes album Tormato (1978), and working on the Alan White and Chris Squire solo single Run with the Fox in 1981. He also worked with Yes guitarist Steve Howe on several occasions.

On the first Classic Rock album, Jackman was responsible for arranging and conducting seven of the ten tracks, recorded at EMI's Abbey Road Studios on 15–16 October 1976 with the London Symphony Orchestra. A further nine albums in the series followed, between 1979 and 1992. He was also the arranger and conductor of The Dust Bowl Symphony, which Nanci Griffith recorded in 1999 with the same orchestra.

Jackman composed much instrumental library and production music for film and television use. His music was used for a scene in An American Werewolf in London. Other film and television credits include Roy Clarke's The Growing Pains of P.C. Penrose (1975) and the independent drama film East of Elephant Rock (1978).

From the 1980s Jackman lived at Tivetshall, Norfolk, where he regularly conducted local choirs and composed music for them to sing. In 2001 he contributed a choral arrangement of 'Swing Low, Sweet Chariot' for the collection Spirituals for Choirs, published by OUP. He had just completed the arrangements for Steve Howe's Elements album when he died of a heart attack on 16 August 2003 at age 57.

== Family ==
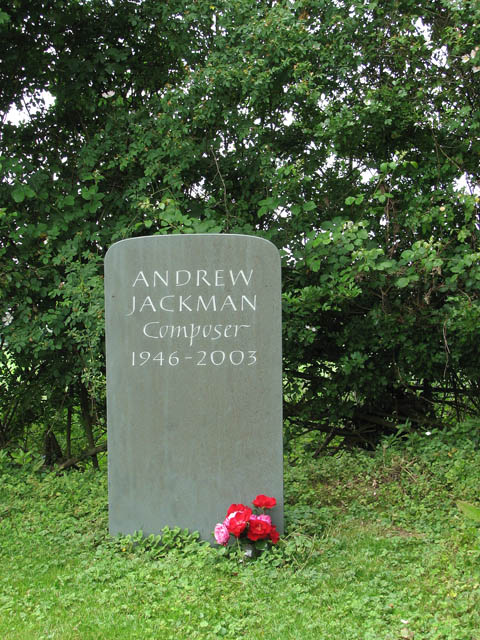
Jackman's grave at St Margaret's church, Tivetshall St Margaret, Norfolk

His brother Gregg Jackman is a sound engineer and producer who has worked with Yes, Enya and Barclay James Harvest. Another brother, Jeremy Jackman, sang countertenor with the King's Singers for ten years. Their father, Bill Jackman, was a session musician who contributed flute, vocals and hand claps to the Beatles songs Hey Jude, and tenor saxophone to Lady Madonna.

Andrew's son, Henry Jackman, is a film composer whose scores include Monsters vs. Aliens, Winnie the Pooh, Puss in Boots, and Wreck-It Ralph. He is also a keyboard player, and performed live with Chris Squire in August 2006. Andrew's youngest son Ralph Jackman is a writer of historical fiction including Actium's Wake (2014) and Agrippa's Wake (2017), both set in ancient Rome.
