= Dirty Power =

Studio album by Shane Theriot
- Released: 2009
- Label: Shose

Shane Theriot chronology
The Grease Factor (2003)	Dirty Power (2009)

Dirty Power is the third studio album by guitarist Shane Theriot. It was released in 2009.

== Track listing ==
1. Old Men (5:21)
2. Dirty Power (3:39)
3. Four On the Floor (3:50)
4. Bring It (3:46)
5. Mr. Ed (3:54)
6. Buckshot (4:36)
7. Memphis (4:20)
8. Buckshot (Reprise) (0:49)
9. The Pygmy Love Dance (4:21)
10. Kirk's Little Backpack (3:04)

== Personnel ==
- Jim Keltner - drums
- Hutch Hutchinson - bass
- Shane Theriot - bass, guitar, baritone guitar, composer, mixing, producer
- Richie Hayward - drums
- Johnny Neel - keys
- Sonny Landreth - guitar
- Zigaboo Modeliste - drums
- Doug Belote - drums
- Adam Nitti - bass
- Johnny Vidacovich - drums
- Kirk Joseph - sousaphone
- Mark Braud - trumpet
- Big Sam Williams - trombone
- Roderick Paulin - sax
- Neal Cappellino, Jack Miele- engineer/mixing
