= Shane Theriot =

American musician

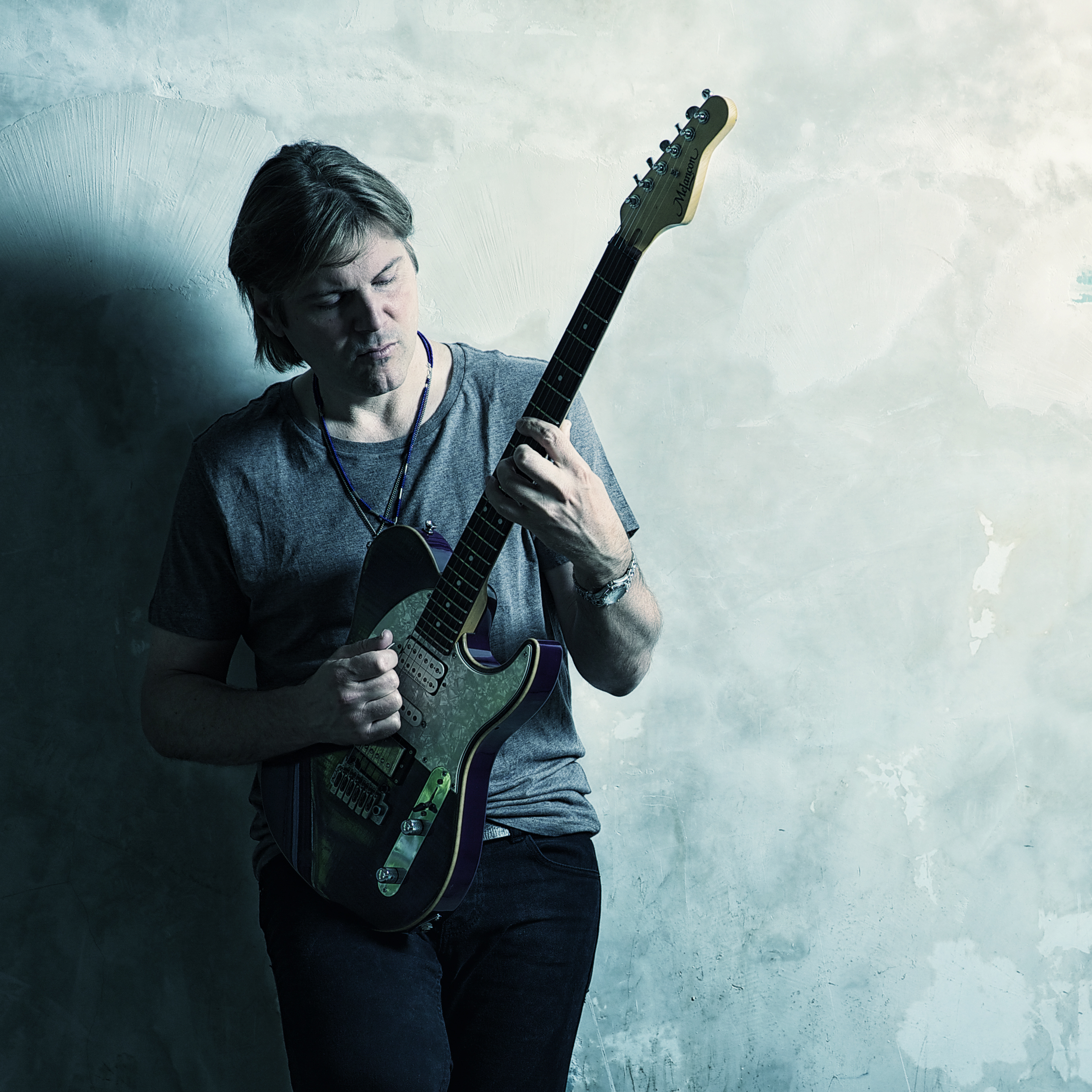

Background information
- Born: October 3, 1972 (age 53); Thibodaux, Louisiana, U.S.
- Genres: Alternative rock
- Occupations: Musician, record producer
- Instruments: Guitar, mandolin
- Years active: 1992–present
- Website: shanetheriot.com

Shane Theriot (/ˈtɛrioʊ/; born October 3, 1972) is an American guitarist, composer, and producer. He is the musical director, guitarist, and band leader for Hall & Oates and musical director/guitarist for the television show Live from Daryl's House. As a composer for TV his music has been used by ESPN, HBO, and Showtime Networks. He is the author of several books on guitar styles, including New Orleans Funk Guitar Styles, and instructional DVDs.

== Early life and education ==
Theriot was born in Thibodaux, Louisiana, a small town about 60 miles from New Orleans. He was exposed to music at a very early age and began playing drums and guitar at 11. He also studied trumpet and piano and played drums in junior high school, as well as in his high school marching band. At the age of 12, he played at the 1984 Louisiana World Exposition. He is mostly self-taught except for some private study in classical and jazz guitar during high school.

Following high school, Theriot attended the Guitar Institute of Technology (now Musicians Institute) in Los Angeles. Guitarist Scott Henderson, an instructor there and (a member of the band Tribal Tech, as well as Chick Corea's band), recommended Theriot for a teaching position when Theriot was 20 years old.

== Music career ==
Theriot was first featured on Mark Varney's 1992 Guitar on the Edge CD series with an original composition, "In Between." In 1996 he began playing with The Neville Brothers, with whom he performed until 2003, touring nationally and internationally. In addition to his work with the band, he worked extensively with both Art Neville and Aaron Neville on solo projects.

In the 1990s he also began working as a session guitarist, and later began recording his own music. Theriot has released four albums as a leader since 2000: Still Motion (2017), Dirty Power (2009), The Grease Factor (2003), and Highway 90 (2000).

Theriot has either recorded or performed with a wide variety of artists in virtually all styles of music including The Neville Brothers, Hall and Oates, Boz Scaggs, LeAnn Rimes, Beyoncé, Harry Connick Jr., Allen Toussaint, Dr. John, Willie Nelson (he also makes an uncredited appearance in the movie The Dukes of Hazzard with Willie Nelson in band scene), Madeleine Peyroux, Sam Moore of Sam and Dave, Aaron Neville, Maria Muldaur, Larry Carlton, John Waite, Leni Stern, Zachary Richard, Howard Jones, Todd Rundgren, Dave Stewart, Glen Tilbrook (Squeeze), Wynonna Judd, Steve Earle, Idris Muhammad, Blue Floyd, Marc Broussard, Slim Whitman, The Syn (with Chris Squire and Alan White of Yes), and Little Feat among others. He spent three years on and off in Boz Scaggs' touring band, and as of 2020 he is musical director for Hall and Oates' touring band.

He was featured on Rickie Lee Jones' Kicks and The Other Side of Desire, playing a variety of instruments including guitar, bass, and lap steel. He also played on multiple Jon Cleary albums, including Dyna-mite and Go Go Juice, which won a Grammy for Best Regional Roots Album in 2016.

Theriot worked as the personal guitar instructor for Forest Whitaker and Nick Nolte for the 2010 movie My Own Love Song. Leni Stern named Theriot one of her "guitar heroes" and "favorite groove master" in an interview with Premier Guitar magazine.

Some notable venues where Theriot has performed include Madison Square Garden, Budokan in Tokyo Japan, The Grand Ole Opry, Montreal, Vancouver and Tokyo Jazz festivals, Radio City Music Hall, Hollywood Bowl and The White House for President Obama. Some notable TV show appearances include The Tonight Show with Jay Leno, Late Night with David Letterman, Jimmy Fallon, Jimmy Kimmel, The Today Show, The View, Soul Train, Conan, Howard Stern Show, and Good Morning America.

Theriot's most recent solo recording is entitled Still Motion and was released in May 2017. The record features three trios recorded in three different cities - New Orleans, Los Angeles and Austin, Texas. Jim Keltner, Johnny Vidacovich and Kirk Covington serve as drummers, while James Singleton, Nate Wood, Chris Maresh and Theriot fill the bass chair.

In the fall of 2024, Theriot was inducted into the Louisiana Music Hall of Fame, of which he said “I feel like my Louisiana upbringing and working with artists like the Neville Brothers and Dr. John and all the other great Louisiana musicians really shaped my style and allowed me to bring something special to a project.”

=== As a producer and composer ===
Theriot has produced records for other artists including Ramsey Lewis (with Dr. John and Kung Fu), Jo-El Sonnier (The Legacy, which won the 2015 Grammy award for Regional Roots album). He also co-produced "Philly Forget Me Not" with Hall, which was the first new collaborative track between Hall and John Oates in 15 years. The song also features Train's Pat Monahan.

He was a guest on Sammy Hagar's "Rock and Roll Roadtrip", where Theriot was appointed to help musically direct the New Orleans episode.

He contributed as a composer and instrumentalist to Larry Carlton and Paul Brown's 2021 album Soul Searchin' . In 2024, he also contributed as a composer and instrumentalist to renowned bassist Mark Egan's album Cross Currents alongside drummer Shawn Pelton.

In June 2019, Rolling Stone announced that Theriot produced Dr John's final album, which was released in 2022. 'Listening to his finished album, Mac was elated. "We sat and listened to everything twice", says Theriot, "He was singing along and had a big grin on his face. Then he walked me out to my car, stared at me and said, 'I'm glad. I made the right choice.' And then he hugged and kissed me on the cheek."'

Theriot has written music and jingles for MTV, Discovery Channel, A&E, CMT, VH1 and ESPN, including for the shows Sons of Guns and Anthony Bourdain's The Layover.

Shane acts as the long-time bandleader and musical director of Live from Daryl's House, which resumed filming and airing in 2023 after a hiatus.

Ahead of the 2024 holiday season, Theriot produced a new take on the classic Christmas track "I Heard the Bells on Christmas Day" for Jay Buchanan (of Rival Sons) and the Blind Boys of Alabama.

== Other ventures ==
Theriot taught guitar at the Atlanta Institute of Music (then GIT Atlanta) from 1991 to 1993 alongside Jimmy Herring (Allman Brothers, Widespread Panic). During this time he traveled and worked as a clinician for the Kaman Corporation, which included Takamine, Ovation and Hamer guitars.

He has written instructional columns for Guitar Player Magazine and has been featured in Guitar Player, Guitar World, Guitar for the Practicing Musician, Downbeat and Vintage Guitar magazine, among others. He has also done seminars for the National Guitar Summer Workshop and is a frequent guest at Musicians Institute campuses in Los Angeles and Japan.

Theriot has written instructional books for guitar players, including The Next Step: Creative Concepts For Improvising Guitarists (Atlanta Institute of Music, 1995) and New Orleans Funk Guitar^{[8]} (Alfred Publishing, 2000). He has three courses available from TrueFire. Rhythm Mojo, Solo Mojo and 30 Mojo Rhythms You Must Know.

As a clinician, Theriot has appeared as a guest instructor along with Dweezil Zappa and Lee Ritenour at the Crown of the Continent Guitar Festival.

In 2016, Theriot started a podcast entitled "The Riff Raff with Shane Theriot, a format where he "interviews and jams with musician friends and creative people". The first few episodes featured John Oates (Daryl Hall and John Oates), jazz musician John Scofield and Meters bassist George Porter Jr. More recent episodes have included "Late Night with David Letterman" bassist Will Lee, Dweezil Zappa, producer/guitarist John Leventhal, Ratt guitarist Warren DeMartini, Mike Stern, Daryl Hall, Sammy Hagar, Wayne Krantz, Mark Egan, G. E. Smith and many others.

== Discography ==
=== As a leader ===
- Highway 90 (2000)
- The Grease Factor (2003)
- Dirty Power (2009)
- Still Motion (2017)
