= Steve Nardelli =

- Born: Stephen Louis Nardelli; 10 April 1948 (age 78)
- Origin: London, England
- Genres: Progressive rock, pop rock
- Occupations: Musician, singer, songwriter
- Instruments: Guitar, vocals
- Years active: 1965–present
- Labels: Deram Records; Umbrello Records

Stephen Louis Nardelli (born 10 April 1948 in London) founded the Syn in 1966 with Chris Squire, Martyn Adelman and others. In 1968, Nardelli left the band for a business career in the fashion and sports industries before reforming the band in 2003 with Adelman and Peter Banks. Banks left the reunited band, but Squire joined and the band recorded a new album, Syndestructible.

== As a musician and song writer ==
Nardelli began playing the guitar at 12. The Beatles, the Who, and the Animals were early influences. Inspired by the scene at the Marquee Club, at fourteen Nardelli formed his first group called High Court, an R&B band. Not long after, High Court changed its name and amalgamated into the Syn with Nardelli, Chris Squire, Andrew Pryce Jackman, Martyn Adelman and John Painter. The Syn are considered a significant part of the pre-history of Yes.

Nardelli's first composition was "Grounded", a freakbeat song that he wrote when 14. He co-wrote "14 Hour Technicolour Dream" in 1967, which was reviewed as "one of the best British psychedelic singles by any band", and voted by Time Out magazine one of the best ever top 100 songs written about London. Both were singles performed by the Syn.

Nardelli continued to write music after The Syn of the 1960s and had a solo recording contract with Decca. Nardelli reformed the Syn with Peter Banks and Martyn Adelman in 2004. The line-up changed, re-uniting Nardelli with Chris Squire, and together they wrote Syndestructible (2005) with contributions from Gerard Johnson and Paul Stacey. This was followed by the album Armistice Day, the title track being written by Nardelli and Johnson. Squire, Johnson and Stacey all left the band, and Nardelli formed a new line-up with Francis Dunnery and Tom Brislin. They released Big Sky in 2009. Nardelli started working in collaboration with Swedish band Moon Safari on a new album in 2010 from the Syn called Trustworks. In an interview for Progzilla Radio in October, Nardelli announced that The Syn Live at Rosfest album was being released early in 2015, together with a newly commissioned film The Syn in the 21st Century, as a prelude to the release of the new studio album Trustworks. In January 2016 Umbrello Records, announced that the Trustworks album would finally be released worldwide on 25 March 2016, having been five years in the making.

== In business ==
After the Syn disbanded, Nardelli, along with his partner Ian Ross, a member of the Ross Foods family and a founder of Radio Caroline, opened a chain of fashion shops in Chelsea and Kensington.

Continuing a connection with the music industry, Nardelli teamed with Tommy Roberts, known for his fashion shop Mr. Freedom. and launched a record label, Fresh Records through WEA.

In 1997, Nardelli acquired from the government of Belgium's Walloon region the Donnay sports brand. He also worked with Mike Ashley (businessman) to successfully purchase the Disport retail chain in Belgium and the Longoni Sports retail chain in Italy. Nardelli also founded Umbrello Records with Chris Squire, and the IPTV music station theONE.tv.

In 2009, Nardelli formed P3 Eco Group (Portfolio Property Partners) with Graham Johnson and Brigadier Ian Inshaw, a Deputy Lord Lieutenant to the Queen and former High Sheriff of Oxfordshire. The company is one of the new eco developers and their site at NW Bicester was selected by Government to be one of four new eco towns. The eco town was master planned by Terry Farrell.. Both Nardelli and Johnson were adjudged bankrupt on 13 September 2024, with a subsequent legal attempt to overturn the bankruptcy failing.

In June 2018, Nardelli was appointed a Rudolph Steiner School charity trustee.

In March 2020, Nardelli was elected Chairman of the Coolhurst Tennis & Squash Club in London, with one of his first actions being to have to close the club following the government pandemic shut-down.

== Discography ==
With The Syn

Solo singles

- "I'll Never Find Another You"/"Mile End Road" - Decca/1978
- "Don't Ever Change"/"Dance Little Rita" - Decca/1978

With 14 Hour Technicolour Dream V-band

- "Reasons & Rituals" - download/2008
