= Faking (music) =

Musician pretending to play all notes

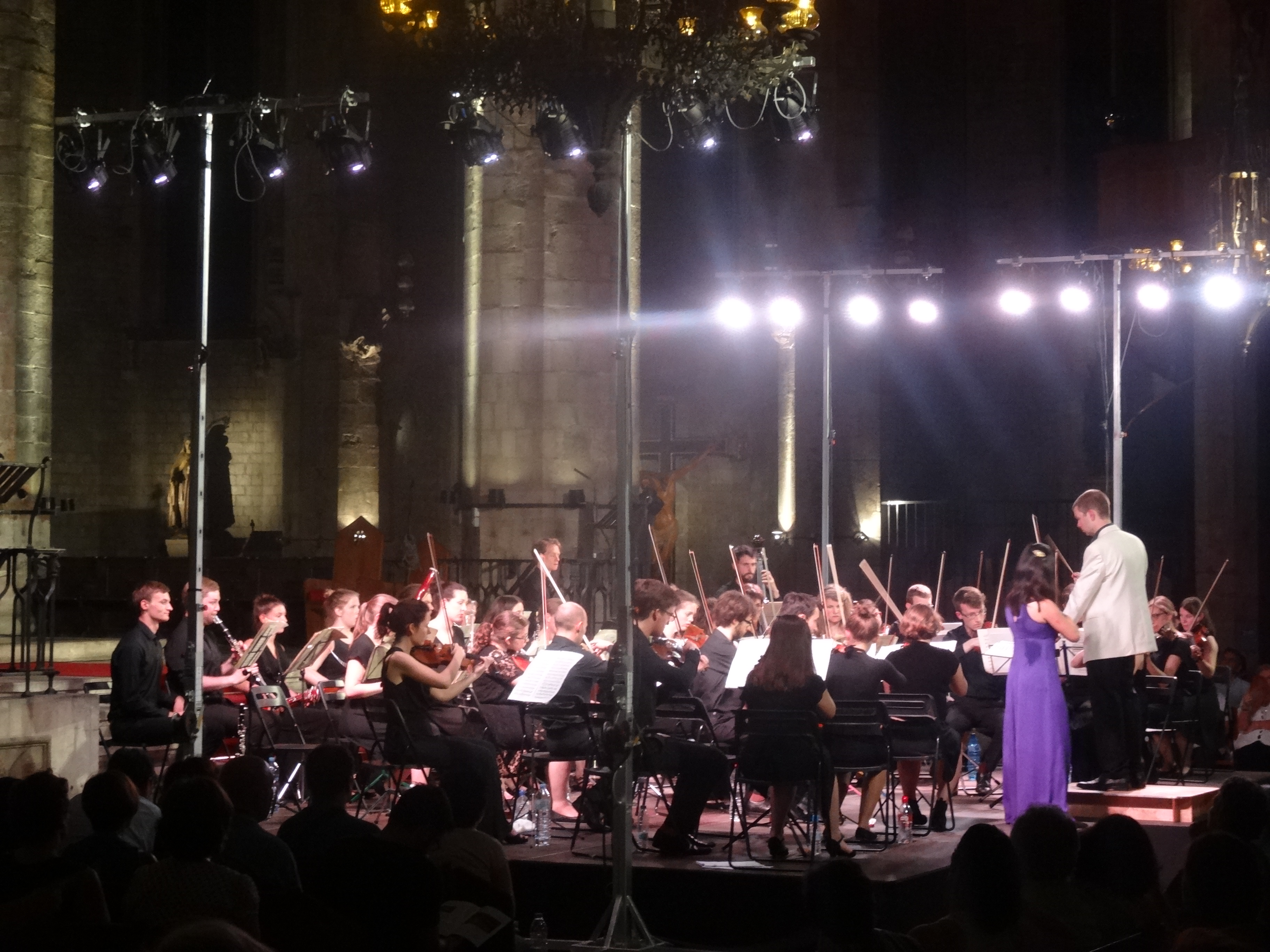
According to The Strad, a leading Classical music magazine, "faking" occurs in all types of orchestras.

In instrumental music, "faking" is the process by which a musician gives the "...impression of playing every note as written" in the printed music part, typically for a very challenging passage that is very high in pitch and/or very rapid, while not actually playing all of the notes in the part. Faking may be done by an orchestra musician, a concerto soloist or a chamber musician; however, faking tends to be more associated with orchestra playing, because the presence of such a large music ensemble (as many as 100 musicians) makes it easier for musicians who "fake" to do so without being detected. A concerto soloist or chamber musician who faked passages would be much easier for audience members and other musicians to detect. Orchestra musicians at every level, from amateur orchestras and youth orchestras to professional orchestra players will occasionally "fake" a hard passage.

== Views ==
In Chinese culture, there is a folktale about a man named Mr. Nanguo who fakes playing the yu in an ensemble, but runs into trouble when asked to play a solo. This idiom is known as 滥竽充数 (Chinese: 濫竽充數), or "to make up the numbers".

Faking is considered controversial in orchestral playing; The Strad calls it one of the "great unmentionable [topics] of orchestral playing". A professional cellist states that all orchestral musicians, even those in the top orchestras, occasionally "fake" certain passages. Professional players who were interviewed were of a consensus that faking because a part is not written well for the instrument may be acceptable, but faking "just because you haven't practised" the music is not acceptable.

A musician from the Canadian Music Centre stated that "...when I hear someone [a musician] say 'I can just fake that' [music] is akin to nails on a chalkboard." The CMC musician states that as a "...performer I feel obligated to make sure I can play the music as well as I can. If that means I have to woodshed [(practice) a] lick up until the day of the concert that is what I will do, I can't personally accept "faking" it as an answer for any kind of music."

The classical music comedy YouTube channel duo TwoSetViolin has made several videos reacting to and criticizing fake classical music portrayals.

== Explanations ==
One reason that musicians "fake" is because there are not enough rehearsals or time to learn the pieces. Another factor is the extreme challenges in contemporary pieces; professionals interviewed by the magazine said "faking" was "...necessary in anything from ten to almost ninety per cent of some modern works. Youth orchestra members and players in amateur or community orchestras may fake because the parts in professional orchestral repertoire are beyond their technical level. Gigging musicians playing in "one-off" pickup groups and local pit orchestras may fake because they do not have time to practice or prepare the music.

== Other meanings ==
In jazz, the term "fake" does not have the same meaning as in Classical music, and as well, it does not carry negative connotations. In jazz, when a jazz quartet "fakes" accompaniment parts to a song with a singer, this is a synonym for improvising their backup parts. Improvising backup lines (chord voicings for piano/guitar, basslines for bass, and drum parts for drum set) is an essential skill for jazz musicians. The use of the term "fake" in the jazz scene is illustrated by the expression "fake book", a collection of lead sheets and chord progressions for jazz standards (commonly-played jazz tunes). The reason the book is called a "fake book" is because trained jazz performers are able to improvise accompaniment parts and solos from the chord charts contained therein.

== Comparison with miming ==
There is some overlap between faking and miming in instrumental performance. The distinction is that with miming, the instrumentalists pretend to play while a pre-recorded backing track sounds over the PA system or, for a broadcast performance, on the audience's TV or radio; with faking, there is no backing track or use of technology. As well, with faking, the performer often plays some portion of the notated music. For example, with a fast scale run, an orchestral musician who is faking may play the first note and the last note. In contrast, a musician who is miming while the recording is playing over speakers does not need to make any sounds at all. They only need move their body, arms and fingers to give the appearance of playing. Indeed, in some miming contexts, the instrumentalists are instructed not to make any sounds at all, as these might be picked up by live vocal mics on the stage.

While miming in instrumental performance is most often associated with popular music, due to the widespread use of lip-synching and miming instrumental playing on TV shows such as Top of the Pops (while the recording plays on the viewer's TV speakers), there are examples where producers have hired an orchestra or chamber musicians to appear on a stage and pretend to play, while the spectators (if in a live venue) or viewers (if a broadcast event) hear a previously recorded tape of that orchestra/ensemble (or a different orchestra or ensemble) playing.

== See also ==
- Miming in instrumental performance
- Offstage musicians and singers in popular music
