= Martyn Adelman =

British photographer and drummer (born 1947)

Martyn J Adelman or Martin, also known as Max Adelman (born 1947) is a British photographer and former drummer.

Adelman learnt to play drums aged 14 and soon formed his first group, The Insteps, also including John Altman. A subsequent band included Peter Knight, later of Steeleye Span.

Adelman was at Barnet College of Further Education with Peter Banks (later of Yes). Adelman later joined The Selfs, including Chris Squire (also later of Yes), and when The Selfs merged with The Syn, Adelman joined Squire and Selfs keyboardist Andrew Jackman in the new band. The Syn played Tamla Motown, blues and soul. Adelman subsequently left the band. However, he did later help Banks get the post of new guitarist in The Syn.

Adelman later took up photography and an early assignment included pictures for Yes' Close to the Edge album. During the 1980s, he did black-and-white portrait work for The Face and Blitz magazine.

In late 2003, Adelman met again Steve Nardelli and Peter Banks and he drummed in a reunion of The Syn in 2004, material appearing on the release Original Syn. Adelman then chose to step away from performing, although he remained associated with the band as a photographer until 2006.
