= Live from Daryl's House =

Online web-series

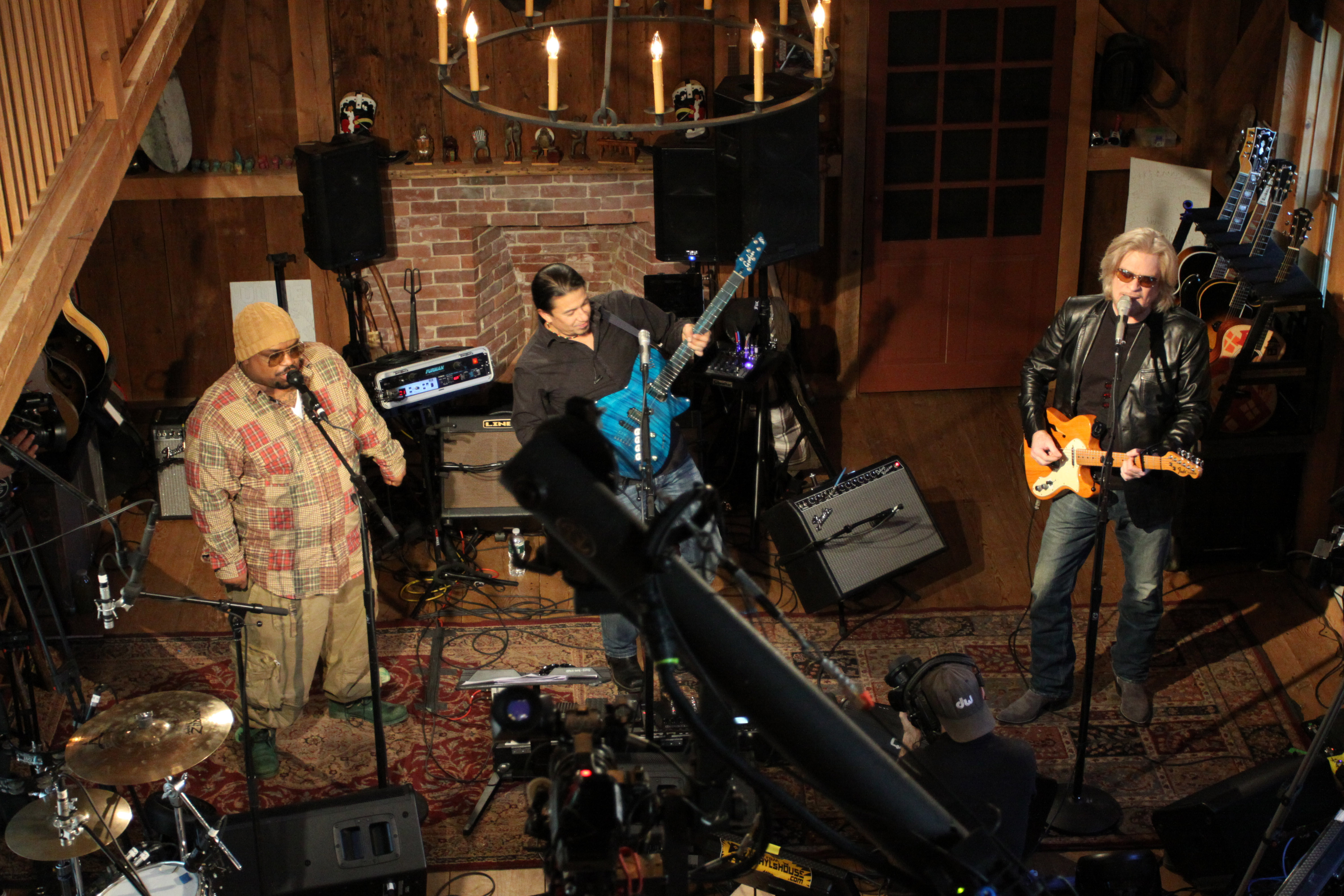
- Genre: Music; Variety; Comedy
- Created by: Daryl Hall
- Starring: Daryl Hall
- Opening theme: "You Make My Dreams" (web series) "Bring It Back Home" (television series)
- Ending theme: "Bring It Back Home" (television series)
- Composer: Daryl Hall
- Country of origin: United States
- Original language: English
- No. of episodes: 90 (LFDH.com)

Production
- Executive producers: Jonathan Wolfson, Daryl Hall
- Production locations: Millerton and Pawling, New York, United States
- Production companies: Good Cop Bad Cop Productions; Scott Sternberg Productions

Original release
- Network: LFDH.com; Palladia (2012–15); RFD-TV/RURAL TV (not currently aired); VH1 (very rarely); MTV Classic (very rarely); MTV Live (2016–present; not currently airing)
- Release: September 24, 2011 – 2025

Related
- Daryl's Restoration Over-Hall

Live from Daryl's House (simply known as Daryl's House and often abbreviated as LFDH) is an online music series that debuted in the autumn of 2007. The show features singer-songwriter Daryl Hall performing with his band and various guest artists at his home in Millerton, New York. The show provides a performance space that is an alternative to live concerts and studio sessions for popular artists. This allows the artists to "…have fun and [be] creatively spontaneous". The majority of shows include a segment in which Hall and the guest artist prepare food from different cuisines for everyone to eat. The food comes from various local restaurants and the chefs of those establishments walk Hall and guest through the preparation of the food.

Originally a web series, Live from Daryl's House expanded to broadcast TV but remained unchanged. Hall was quoted by Billboard.com as saying "it's an Internet show that is being shown on television, so I'm not adapting the show at all in any way to be a 'TV' show." The show debuted in 95 markets on September 24, 2011, with back-to-back half-hour episodes featuring Train (Episode 33) and Fitz and the Tantrums (Episode 35). Starting with the 66th episode, the shows are filmed at Hall's club, Daryl's House, in Pawling, New York.

== History ==
The first web show was a solo production which featured Hall and his backing band playing "Everything Your Heart Desires"Everything Your Heart Desires. It was not until the second episode that the show introduced its guest star format. Hall's long-time performing and songwriting partner John Oates (of the band Hall & Oates) was the first guest on the show with a Christmas episode entitled "Trimming the Tree".

Hall created Live from Daryl's House as a refuge from live touring on the road. He stated in an interview with Rolling Stone magazine that he wanted to bring the world to him. Hall wanted the opportunity to collaborate with contemporary artists, and this is his vehicle in which to do so.

Live from Daryl's House originally appeared on the program's website in November 2007. The initial episode was completely funded by Hall. In subsequent shows, costs were defrayed by corporate sponsors. In addition to corporate sponsorship, Hall routinely plugged local restaurants that provided catering for the shows. Often, the chef would teach Hall and the guest artist how to prepare at least one of the dishes that were served. When the program gained popularity, Hall's Good Cop Bad Cop Productions company signed two syndication deals. In 2012, the Viacom-owned Palladia network took over the finances with help from a deal arranged by executive producer Jonathan Wolfson (Hall & Oates manager).

In July 2018, BMG announced a new partnership with Live from Daryl's House. The agreement included worldwide rights to the entire 82-episode collection filmed from 2007 to 2016. The show's new production began in the fall of 2018 and was executive produced by Daryl Hall and Jonathan Wolfson for Good Cop Bad Cop Productions, and Joe Thomas and Bob Frank for BMG. Domenic Cotter of Sound Off Productions continued as the show's producer.

== Episodes ==
As of November 2025, 91 episodes of Live from Daryl's House have been broadcast.

Episode No.	Guest or episode name	Date	Notes
01	Daryl Hall	November 15, 2007	
02	John Oates	December 15, 2007	
03	Daryl Hall	January 15, 2008	
04	Travis McCoy	February 15, 2008	
05	KT Tunstall	March 15, 2008	Filmed at Hall's townhouse in London, England
06	Live at SXSW	April 15, 2008	Filmed at SXSW in Austin, Texas
07	Chuck Prophet and Mutlu Onaral	May 15, 2008	
08	Nick Lowe	June 15, 2008	Filmed at Hall's townhouse in London
09	Monte Montgomery	July 15, 2008	
10	Chromeo	August 15, 2008	
11	Finger Eleven	September 15, 2008	
12	Eric Hutchinson	October 15, 2008	
13	John Oates	November 15, 2008	
14	Kevin Rudolf	December 15, 2008	
15	Company of Thieves	January 15, 2009	
16	The Bacon Brothers	February 15, 2009	
17	Matt Nathanson	March 15, 2009	
18	Robby Krieger and Ray Manzarek	April 15, 2009	Filmed in Pacific Palisades, California
19	A Retrospective	May 15, 2009	
20	Parachute	June 15, 2009	
21	Plain White T's	July 15, 2009	
22	Smokey Robinson	August 15, 2009	
23	Todd Rundgren	September 15, 2009	
24	Diane Birch	October 15, 2009	
25	Patrick Stump	November 15, 2009	
26	Jimmy Wayne	December 15, 2009	
27	Eli "Paperboy" Reed featuring Alan Gorrie	January 15, 2010	
28	Toots and the Maytals	February 15, 2010	Filmed in Jamaica
29	Maxi Priest and Billy Ocean	April 15, 2010	Filmed at the Jamaica Jazz and Blues Festival in Montego Bay, Jamaica
30	Remembering Tom "T-Bone" Wolk	May 15, 2010	Featuring former bandmates guitarist G. E. Smith, sax player Mark Rivera and drummer Mickey Curry
31	Rob Thomas	June 15, 2010	
32	Retrospective (2nd Annual)	July 15, 2010	
33	Train	August 15, 2010	
34	Sharon Jones	September 15, 2010	
35	Fitz and the Tantrums	October 15, 2010	
36	Neon Trees	November 15, 2010	
37	José Feliciano	December 15, 2010	
38	Guster	January 15, 2011	
39	New Year's Eve Special	February 15, 2011	
40	Todd Rundgren	March 15, 2011	Filmed at Rundgren's house in Kauaʻi, Hawaii
41	Dave Stewart	April 15, 2011	
42	John Rzeznik	May 15, 2011	
43	Mayer Hawthorne	June 15, 2011	Featuring Booker T. Jones
44	Booker T. Jones	July 15, 2011	
45	Grace Potter	August 15, 2011	
46	Nikki Jean	September 15, 2011	
47	Daryl Hall Part 1	October 15, 2011	First half of Laughing Down Crying
48	Daryl Hall Part 2	November 15, 2011	Second half of Laughing Down Crying
49	Blind Boys Of Alabama	December 15, 2011	
50	Keb' Mo'	January 15, 2012	
51	Allen Stone	February 15, 2012	
52	CeeLo Green	March 15, 2012	
53	The Dirty Heads	April 15, 2012	
54	Butch Walker	May 15, 2012	
55	Jason Mraz	June 15, 2012	
56	Chiddy Bang	July 15, 2012	
57	Rumer	August 15, 2012	
58	Nick Waterhouse	September 15, 2012	
59	Live at the Borgata	October 15, 2012	Filmed at the Borgata in Atlantic City, New Jersey, featuring Sharon Jones and Allen Stone
60	Joe Walsh	November 15, 2012	
61	Shelby Lynne	December 15, 2012	
62	Minus the Bear	January 15, 2013	
63	Billy Gibbons	January 15, 2014	
64	Gavin DeGraw	February 15, 2014	
65	Johnnyswim	March 15, 2014	
66	Amos Lee	April 15, 2014	First episode at the club Daryl's House
67	Brett Dennen	May 15, 2014	
68	Darius Rucker	June 14, 2014	Filmed in Charleston, South Carolina
69	Sammy Hagar	May 15, 2015	Filmed at Cabo Wabo in Cabo San Lucas, Mexico
70	Ben Folds	June 12, 2015	
71	Kandace Springs	July 15, 2015	
72	Aaron Neville	August 15, 2015	
73	Kitty, Daisy & Lewis	September 15, 2015	
74	Aloe Blacc	October 15, 2015	
75	Cheap Trick	May 5, 2016	
76	Wyclef Jean	May 12, 2016	
77	Elle King	May 19, 2016	
78	The O'Jays	May 26, 2016	
79	Anderson East	June 2, 2016	
80	Chris Daughtry	June 9, 2016	
81	Grace	June 16, 2016	
82	Kenny Loggins	June 23, 2016	
83	Tommy Shaw	October 1, 2020	
84	Ty Taylor	October 8, 2020	
85	Glenn Tilbrook	November 1, 2023	
86	Charlie Starr	November 8, 2023	
87	Robert Fripp	November 15, 2023	
88	Andy Grammer	November 22, 2023	
89	Lisa Loeb	November 29, 2023	
90	Howard Jones	December 6, 2023	
91	Dave Stewart and Vanessa Amorosi	June 27, 2025	First performance of songs from D

== Syndication ==
Live from Daryl's House gained traction on Rural Media Group's channels, and the Palladia network through a deal brokered by the show's Executive Producer Jonathan Wolfson, Rick Krim (VH1), and Ben Zurier (Executive Vice President, Programming Strategy, VH1, VH1 Classic, Palladia). The show currently continues to air on VH1, MTV Live (formerly Palladia) (Viacom Media Network), RFD-TV and Family Net (both of the Rural Media Group), and on the Live from Daryl's House website. The show's website continues to premier the latest episodes from the series, and holds an archive of some of the past episodes. In an announced agreement, 2014 will see the show continue to air on Viacom Media Network's Palladia music channel and new episodes will appear on all previously mentioned outlets.

The series has led to Daryl Hall touring a live version of the show with Sharon Jones and Allen Stone, among others.

== The "House" ==
From the inception of the show until the 65th episode, Live from Daryl's House primarily took place at Hall's home in Millerton, New York. This home consisted of two Connecticut Valley Houses that were built between 1771 and 1781. These houses were disassembled in their original locations and shipped to Millerton, New York where they were reassembled back into their original structures and preserved. The houses now sit as one on Hall's 250 acres of farmland, which is located on the New York/Connecticut border 50 miles to the west of their original location.

Episode 65 was the last show to be filmed from Hall's Millerton residence. In October 2013, Hall began leasing and renovating the Pawling building that once housed the Towne Crier nightclub in Pawling, New York. Having remodeled the venue to look like his old home, even naming it Daryl's House, the 66th episode of Live from Daryl's House was filmed at the new location.

Long known for his passion of restoring historical homes, Hall produced another television show titled Daryl's Restoration Over-Hall. This series appeared on DIY Network and was executive produced by Hall, Michael Morrissey and Jonathan Wolfson. The show focused on restoring Hall's colonial-era home in Sherman, Connecticut.

=== Other locations ===
Episodes 4 (KT Tunstall) and 8 (Nick Lowe) of the series were filmed at Hall's London townhouse.

Episode 6 was filmed at the SXSW festival in Austin, Texas.

Episodes 28 and 29 were filmed in Jamaica.

Episode 40 was filmed at Todd Rundgren's home in Hawaii.

Episode 68 (Darius Rucker) was filmed in Charleston, South Carolina.

Episode 69 (Sammy Hagar) was filmed at the Cabo Wabo in Cabo San Lucas, Mexico.

== Band members ==
The house band consists of Hall and a core of key members along with several guest musicians based on the genre of the guest star. T-Bone Wolk was the first musical director. After Wolk's death in 2010, guitarist Paul Pesco was the musical director until early 2014, when Hall replaced Pesco with guitarist and musical director Shane Theriot.

From the first episode, Wolk's house musicians were guitarist/keyboardist Eliot Lewis, drummer Shawn Pelton, percussionist Everett Bradley, and bassist Zev Katz, who frequently ended episodes with a "Moment of Zev." Drummer Steve Holly also made early appearances. Through Pesco's tenure and into Theriot's, the band coalesced around Lewis, his ex-Average White Band bandmates drummer Brian Dunne and bassist Klyde Jones, and percussionist Porter Carroll Jr. A frequent guest throughout the series is saxophonist Charles DeChant. In 2024, Lewis left the band to pursue solo projects, and Greg Mayo took over on keyboards.

Starting in 2022, the band toured under the name Daryl Hall and the Daryl's House Band.

== Awards ==
In 2010, Live from Daryl's House won the "Best Variety Series" from the Webby Awards Group. The series was also nominated for a Music Webby in the same year. The show won a MTV O Music Award in 2010 for "Best Performance Series".
