= Highway 90 (Shane Theriot album) =

Studio album by Shane Theriot
- Released: 2000
- Label: Shose
- Producer: Shane Theriot, Jim Roberts

Shane Theriot chronology
| Highway 90 (2000) | The Grease Factor (2003) |

Highway 90 is the debut album by guitarist Shane Theriot. It was released in 2000.

== Track listing ==
1. "It Ain't My Fault"
2. "Pump"
3. "Trashy"
4. "Highway 90"
5. "The Street Beater (Theme From Sanford and Son)"
6. "Punch"
7. "Shiho"
8. "1321 N. Las Palmas"
9. "Stampy"
10. "Bayou Chicken"
11. "Cabildo Breeze"

== Personnel ==
- Shane Theriot - guitar, composer, producer, additional snare drum, rubboard
- Victor Wooten - bass
- "Mean" Willie Green - drums
- Adam Nitti - bass
- Tom Reynolds - keys
- Paul Chapman - bass
- J.D. Blair - drums
- Kim Stone - bass
- Jo-El Sonnier - accordion
- Jim Roberts - co-producer, percussion
- Eric Struthers - guitar
- Johnny Neel - organ
- Neal Cappellino - mixing/engineer
