= Offstage musicians and singers in popular music =

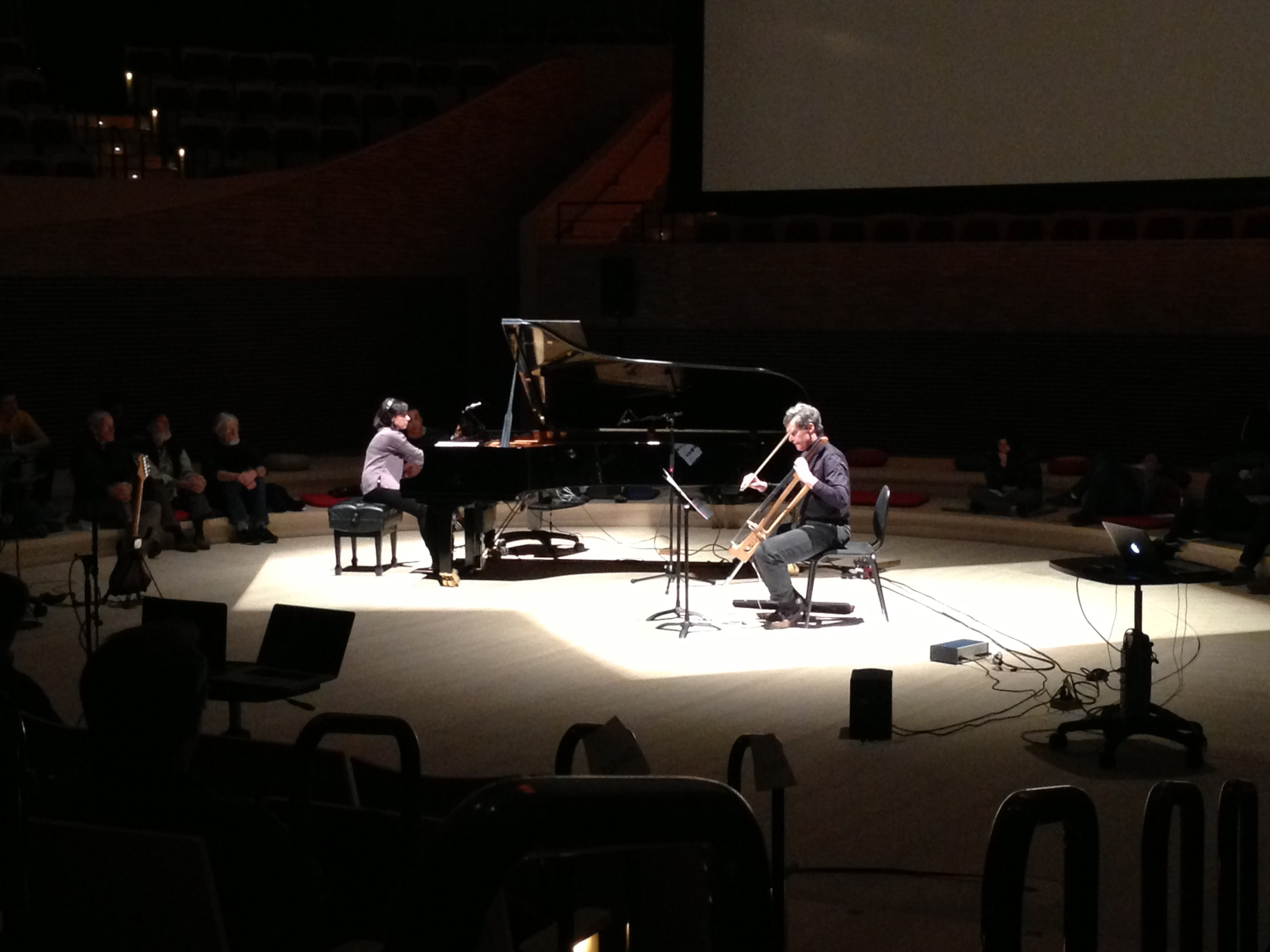
At this West Pole Reloaded concert, while the keyboard player and celletto player performed onstage, the musician triggering the electronic instruments was located offstage for the performance.

Offstage musicians and singers are performers who play instruments and/or sing backstage, out of sight of the audience, during a live popular music concert at which the main band is visible playing and singing onstage. The sound from the offstage musicians or singers is captured by a microphone or from the output of their instrument, and this signal is mixed in with the singing and playing of the onstage performers using an audio console and a sound reinforcement system. Offstage backup singers are also used in some Broadway musicals, as have offstage instrumentalists, in cases where an onstage actor needs to appear to play an instrument.

The offstage musicians and singers are typically located beside the stage, behind the speaker stacks, backstage, under the stage (for raised stages), or, for music festivals held out of doors, in a tent near the backstage area.

== Terminology ==
Offstage performers may be called an "offstage touring guitarist", "offstage touring keyboard player", "offstage guitarist", "offstage keyboardist", "offstage backup singer" or "offstage harmony singer". In music theatre, singers may be called "pit singers" or "offstage voices". Slang terms are also used, such as "ghost singer".

== Roles ==
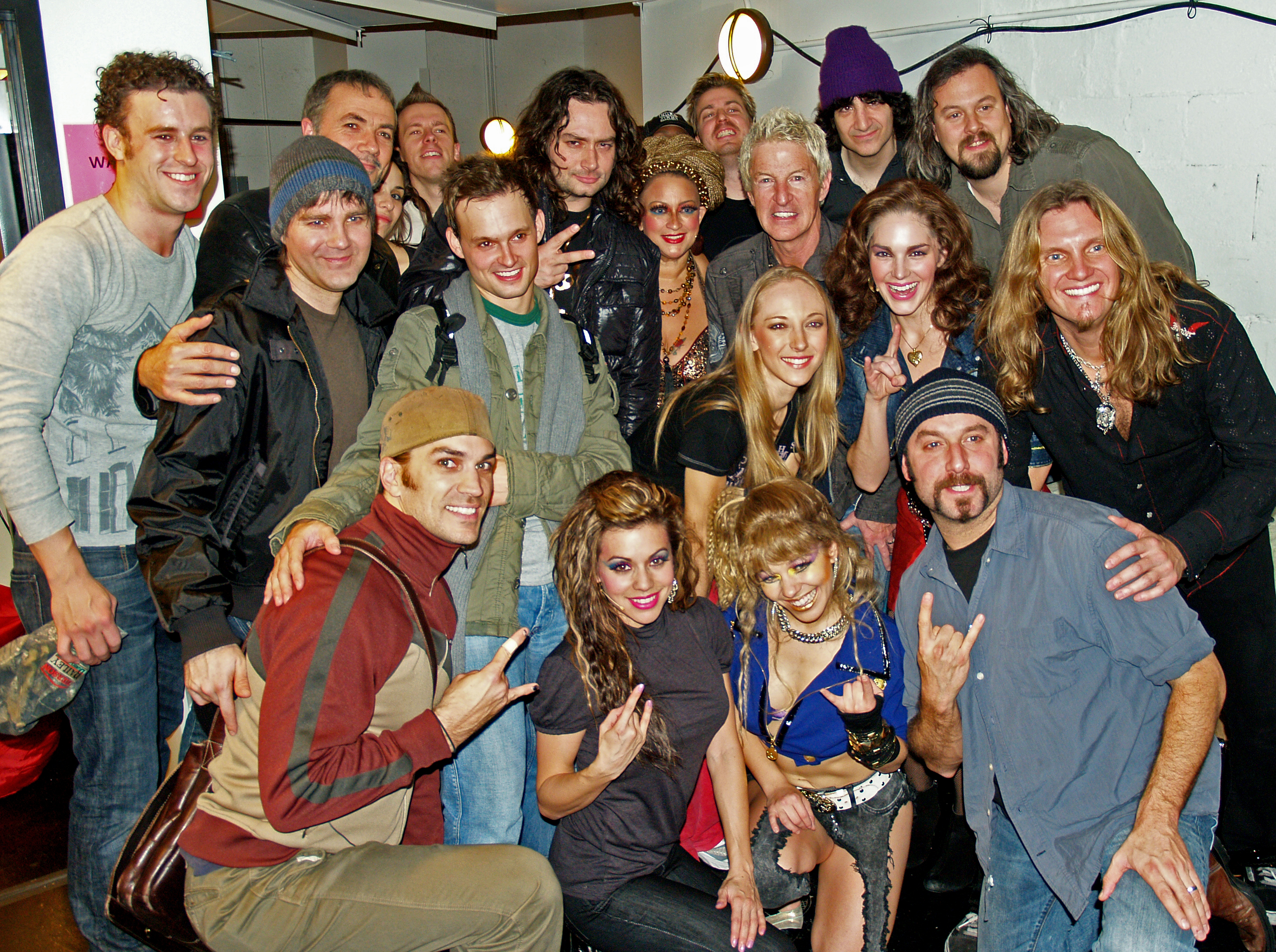
The cast of the off-Broadway musical Rock of Ages. The singer in the top right of the third (back) row, Tad Wilson, is an offstage singer and understudy ("cover") for one of the onstage singers, in the event of illness.

Some offstage performers are hired solely to play one or more instruments (e.g., synthesizer, rhythm guitar, percussion). Some offstage performers are hired solely to sing backup vocals. Some offstage performers are hired to play an instrument and sing backup or harmony vocals at the same time. Offstage musicians can be hired for one-off concerts, but they are generally hired for entire tours. Some offstage musicians or singers work with the same band for many years.

In Broadway musicals, some of the offstage singers may have a secondary role as understudy to one of the onstage singers; the understudy (also called the "cover", "standby" or "alternate") sings the part of the onstage actor in front of the audience, in costume, in the event that the main singer becomes ill.

Some offstage performers have another profession or role that they perform in addition. Iron Maiden offstage keyboardist Michael Kenney's other role is as the bassist's bass tech.

== Acknowledgement ==
Some offstage performers are asked to sign a nondisclosure agreement which forbids them from doing interviews regarding their offstage performance work for a certain group. Sharon Osbourne states that Ozzy Osbourne's offstage singers and musicians are acknowledged in concert programs and, for concerts that are recorded, in the recording credits. Alan Fitzgerald was the offstage keyboard player for Bruce Springsteen's Devils & Dust Tour. In the final two shows of the tour, Springsteen invited Fitzgerald up on stage, introduced him, and played with him. When Alan Fitzgerald played off-stage keyboards for Van Halen, he was credited as Eddie Van Halen's "keyboard technician", a euphemism which acknowledged Fitzgerald's role as a keyboard player without admitting Fitzgerald was an offstage performer. Terry Lawless is credited in some sources as a keyboard technician and keyboard programmer for the band he works for.

== Approaches ==
The instrumental playing by offstage performers is captured by a microphone for acoustic instruments such as acoustic guitar; by mic in front of the guitar amplifier and/or a DI unit output for an electric instrument such as electric bass, by mic for electric guitar (in front of the guitar amp) and Hammond organ with a Leslie speaker, or for an electronic instrument such as a synthesizer, by getting the signal from the instrument's output. Singing is captured by a microphone.

In all cases, the signal from the instruments and/or microphones are routed to the multicore cable (often nicknamed the "snake") and then plugged into the mixing board. Once the offstage musicians and singers' signals are plugged into the mixing board, the audio engineer can blend their sounds in with the playing and singing of the onstage musicians (which is also captured by microphones and/or signal cables). The mixed output is then routed to the PA system or sound reinforcement system, the combination of power amplifiers and speaker enclosures which outputs the concert sounds for the audience.

=== Pit orchestra ===
A pit orchestra cannot be seen by all audience members. However, audience members in higher seats can see the pit musicians; as such, a typical pit orchestra in front of a stage cannot truly be considered to be hidden from the audiences' view. In some venues, there is no orchestra out in front of the stage; in this case, the pit orchestra may play in a room near the stage or backstage, watching the conductor's gestures using a video monitor. While a pit orchestra that is located out of sight of the audience is technically an offstage ensemble, there is no intent on the part of the producers to deceive the audience.

== Challenges ==
For offstage musicians and singers, playing and/or singing in tune and in time with the onstage performers can be challenging, since the offstage musicians are not in the same location as the onstage performers. To help the offstage musicians and singers play and sing in tune and in time, the offstage musicians are provided with monitor speakers which reproduce the onstage playing and singing. As well, for offstage backup singers, they may be provided with a teleprompter video screen, which scrolls the lyrics down the screen. This helps the backup singer to remember the lyrics and the appropriate times to sing. A CCTV system may be set up, with cameras pointing at the stage, and TV monitors in the offstage performer area; this way, the offstage performers can see cues (head nods, hand signals) made by the lead singer or bandleader onstage. The offstage musician or singer may be given headphones with an intercom, to enable the audio engineer to communicate with the offstage performers. For offstage singers, a vocal booth may be set up to exclude outside sounds.

== Rationale ==
There are many reasons that established bands and groups use offstage musicians and singers for concerts and concert tours. When heavy metal band Kiss hired an offstage keyboardist, it was to fill in the band's sound during the live concerts with backing chords and deep bass notes. However, one of the band members felt that only guitarists should be seen on stage, due to the group's reputation as a guitar-based heavy metal band. In other cases, a group has been a trio or a quartet for decades, and the decision is made that having a touring keyboardist, rhythm guitarist or backup singer appear onstage could lead to speculation that the band may be adding a new member; to avoid rumours, the extra touring musician or singer is instructed to play or sing offstage. In some cases, the session musician who recorded an instrumental part on the album may not be available for an entire tour.

Having offstage musicians and/or singers enables a small group to produce a bigger, richer sound. As well, if the album that the group is promoting with the concert tour used extensive overdubs and extra musicians, playing the songs with just a trio or quartet might sound thin compared with the album. For example, with a power trio, the electric guitar player can record several layers of guitar: riffs, chords, fills and guitar solos, giving the impression (on the album) that several guitar players are performing. If this same power trio were to play live without offstage musicians, the band's sound would not be able to match the instrumentation of the album. As such, the band may hire an offstage rhythm guitarist.

For bands that have complex stage shows or choreographed dance routines, having offstage musicians and/or singers ensures that the playing and singing keeps going even if the onstage performers are momentarily distracted by doing dance moves or movements. In some cases, choreographed dance routines may require significant attention from the performer. If a guitarist is having to move in time with dancers, their attention from playing may be distracted. If the group has an offstage rhythm guitarist, then the rhythm guitar will continue even if the onstage performer stops for short periods.

Another reason for using offstage musicians is the increasingly complex recordings which are done in multitrack recording studio facilities. Unlike pre-multitrack days, when all the instrumentalists and singers would record the song in a single "take", with multitrack recording, the drums can be recorded one day, the bass guitar the next day, the rhythm guitar the next, backup vocalists a week later and a string section a month later. The core band members can then overdub keyboard instruments, lead vocals, guitar solos and other parts over a period of weeks or even months. The resulting recordings may feature a very large cast of instrumentalists and singers. Instead of bringing all of these extra musicians and singers onstage, some bands choose to have the extra musicians and backup singers perform offstage.

In the 2007 Eurovision Song Competition, the United Kingdom's entry, Scooch, used "...extra [hidden] vocalists [to] hi[t] 'high harmon[y]" notes, with the extra singers hidden backstage. The song finished in 22nd place, tied with France.

== Reception ==
New Jersey's Upstage magazine liked Bruce Springsteen's Devils & Dust Tour show in general, but felt that the use of off-stage musicians was unsettling, saying "the idea of a solo acoustic tour loses something when it features other [offstage] musicians who are neither given credit for their work nor seen on stage." In the 2007 Eurovision scandal, viewers of the televised singing competition show and other competing groups were upset when they learned that the winning group, Scooch, used "...extra [hidden] vocalists hitting 'high harmonies' backstage".

In the play "Blind Lemon Blues," the actors pretend to play guitar on stage while an offstage guitarist plays. Encore magazine states that the fact that the cast members are only pretending to play "...is most glaring in the opening scene, when it becomes apparent that the bluesmen are picking at guitars as they sing, but not actually playing them". "The actors' fake strumming is distracting at first", but then the audience's "attention shifts to the magnificent singing".

== Examples ==
=== Keyboards ===
- John Sinclair played offstage keyboards for Ozzy Osbourne.
- Black Sabbath used an offstage keyboardist at concerts for over 40 years. Adam Wakeman states that it is the only offstage keyboard gig he does.
- Terry Lawless has played offstage keyboards for U2 for years. Lawless has signed a nondisclosure agreement, so he did not give an interview regarding his work for this band; he is credited in some sources as a keyboard technician and keyboard programmer.
- Iron Maiden bass tech Michael Kenney plays offstage keyboards for the band
- Derek Sherinian played offstage keyboards for Kiss.
- Brett Tuggle, known for his onstage keyboard playing for Fleetwood Mac, was an offstage singer and keyboard player for David Lee Roth in 1986. Unlike most offstage performers, Tuggle was invited onstage with the band for the last few songs of each concert. For the start of the big Van Halen hit "Jump", Roth acknowledged Tuggle by name and asked him to start off the tune's distinctive synth part.
- Alan Fitzgerald played keyboards offstage for Van Halen in the early 1990s and the 2004, 2007, and 2012 tours as well as offstage keyboard for Bruce Springsteen at the Devils & Dust Tour in 2005.
- Warrant used an offstage keyboard player.
- Pet Shop Boys used an offstage keyboardist at a 1991 concert
- Avenged Sevenfold uses offstage keyboards.
- Robbie Gennet played offstage keyboards for Saigon Kick during their 1991 tour.
- John Jessel played offstage keyboards, triggered vocal and instrument samples, and sung background vocals for Toto from 1986 until 2003.
- Jess Kent performs on her singing tours with an offstage synth player.

=== Drums ===
- Judas Priest used an offstage drummer playing electronic drums and triggering samples, while the official drummer played onstage. The offstage drummer augmented the drum sound.
- The Walker Brothers used an offstage drummer during live performances. Gary Walker, the group's ostensible drummer, was regarded as having no real aptitude for the instrument and mimed onstage with paper sticks.

=== Guitar ===
- Kerrang editor Geoff Barton saw an offstage guitarist performing during a Michael Schenker concert.
- Pet Shop Boys used an offstage guitarist at a 1991 concert.
- In actor Akin Babatunde's portrayal of the legendary bluesman Blind Lemon Jefferson in the play "Blind Lemon Blues," Babatunde pretends to play guitar on stage while offstage guitarist Skip Krevens plays the actual guitar the audience is hearing.
- Josh Groban uses an offstage guitarist on tour.

=== Backup vocals ===
- Mott the Hoople retained original vocalist Stan Tippins as a road manager, but he also continued to sing vocal parts from offstage in live performances.
- Robert Mason sang offstage backup vocals for Ozzy Osbourne in 1995 and 1996.
- Broadway musicals such as Jersey Boys and Rock of Ages use hidden backstage singers in vocal booths to sing harmony vocals to fill out the sound, without "crowding the stage" with extra performers.

== Related approaches ==
Some bands have an offstage sequencer-programmer who triggers basslines, beats, digitally sampled sounds or backing tracks. Backing tracks can be as simple as a single prerecorded instrument, such as a recording of a pipe organ, which is impossible to move onstage, to string section recordings done in the studio, to full rhythm section recordings with bass, guitar, keyboards and drums. Some backing tracks also include backup vocals. An offstage technician or audio engineer triggers the sequencer, samples or backing tracks at the appropriate time. Some guitar technicians operate effects units from offstage or trigger samples for their guitarist. At some "...shows, an [audio] engineer at the side of the stage watches the show closely and starts the song in Ableton Live at the correct moment."

== See also ==
- Offstage instrument or choir part in classical music
- Backing track (using a prerecorded track in a live performance)
- Ghost singer (a singer who performs in place of another vocalist for a recording)
- Miming in instrumental performance (when musicians pretend to play their instruments)
