= Faking (jazz) =

Jazz technique in improvisation

In jazz, the term "faking" means to improvise accompaniment parts. The term "faking" in jazz does not have the same meaning as in faking in Classical music, where faking is seen as a controversial activity. In jazz, when a jazz quartet "fakes" accompaniment parts to a song with a singer, this is a synonym for improvising their backup parts. Improvising backup lines (chord voicings for piano/guitar, basslines for bass, and drum parts for drum set) is an essential skill for jazz musicians. The use of the term "fake" in the jazz scene is illustrated by the expression "fake book", a collection of lead sheets and chord progressions for jazz standards (commonly-played jazz tunes). The reason the book is called a "fake book" is because trained jazz performers are able to improvise accompaniment parts and solos from the chord charts contained therein.

== History ==
A predecessor to fake books was created in May 1942 when George Goodwin, a radio station director, released the first Tune-Dex cards. Printing on 3-by-5-inch (7.6 by 12.7 cm) index cards that had the same size as library catalog cards, Goodwin provided lyrics, melody and chord symbols as well as copyright information. Goodwin also promoted the cards to professional musicians until 1963, when poor health forced his retirement. For many years the "standard" fake books were called simply "Fake Books". All were composed of songs illegally printed, with no royalties paid to the copyright owners. In 1964, the FBI's Cleveland, Ohio, office observed that "practically every professional musician in the country owns at least one of these fake music books as they constitute probably the single most useful document available".

The first two volumes, Fake Book Volume 1 and Fake Book Volume 2, issued in the late 1940s–1950s, together comprised about 2000 songs dating from the turn of the 20th century through the late 1950s. In the 1950s the Modern Jazz Fake Book, Volumes 1 and 2 was issued, and Fake Book Volume 3, containing about 500 songs, came out in 1961. The music in Fake Books 1, 2, and 3 was photocopied or reset with a musical typewriter from the melody lines of the original sheet music. Usually chord symbols, titles, composer names, and lyrics were typewritten, but for a number of songs these were all photocopied along with the melody line.

In the 2000s, some types of "real books" have been published which fully respect copyright laws. In the 2000s, some computer-based "fake books" became available. Since these computer-based fake books are stored on a computer, the user can have the key transposed instantly. This facilitates the performance of music at shows where some performers have transposing instruments, or in shows with a singer who wants the band to play in a different key to accommodate her vocal range. Examples of such transposable charts software are Jazz studies (web based) and Fakebook (Android app).
