= Clare & the Reasons =

American pop band

Clare and the Reasons
- Origin: Brooklyn, New York, U.S.
- Genres: Indie pop, indie rock
- Years active: 2005–present
- Labels: Frog Stand
- Members: Clare Manchon; Olivier Manchon; Bob Hart
- Website: clareandthereasons.com

Clare and the Reasons is an American pop band led by singer-songwriter Clare Manchon (née Muldaur) and her husband, Olivier Manchon.

== Early life and influences ==
Clare Muldaur is the daughter of musician Geoff Muldaur and his second spouse.

She released two solo albums before becoming a member of the Reasons. She cites Bessie Smith as an early favorite, in addition to the music of the 1930s and '40s, French films, and the movie musical Singin' in the Rain.

In 2005, Clare Muldaur attended the Berklee School of Music to study jazz composition. She and Olivier Manchon formed the band with Alan Hampton on bass, Beth Meyers on viola, Christopher Hoffman on cello, and Greg Ritchie on drums. They released their first album, The Movie, two years later, with guest appearances by Van Dyke Parks and Sufjan Stevens. After the album was released, the group added multi-instrumentalist Bob Hart.

To support their second album, Arrow, Clare and the Reasons toured the U.S. and Canada with Van Dyke Parks, Vic Chesnutt, and Nouvelle Vague.

They did an extensive European tour in March 2010. The Reasons had many European festivals in the summer of 2010 (including Primavera Sound Festival and Meltdown Festival in London) and another U.S. tour with Van Dyke Parks in the fall of 2010. They performed with Daniel Levitin at the 92nd Street Y in New York City in 2011.

Clare and the Reasons' music has appeared on the show Arrested Development. Clare Manchon has two songs in the French films, Jusqu'à toi, and Les Nuits de Sister Welsh.

== Discography ==
- The Movie ( Frog Stand, 2007), includes a cover of "Everybody Wants to Rule the World" by Tears for Fears, and a song named after Manhattan's Alphabet City.
- Arrow (Frog Stand, 2009) – includes of cover of "That's All" by Genesis
- Live in Amsterdam (Frog Stand, 2010)
- KR-51 (Frog Stand, 2012)
