= The Syn =

English band

- Also known as: High Court
- Origin: England
- Genres: British R&B; psychedelic rock; progressive rock
- Years active: 1965–1967, 2004–present
- Labels: Deram, Umbrello Records
- Members: Steve Nardelli
- Past members: George Arzymanow; John Painter; Chris Squire; Andrew Pryce Jackman; Martyn Adelman; Peter Banks; Gunnar Jökull Hákonarson; Gerard Johnson; Steve Gee; Paul Stacey; Jeremy Stacey; Gary Husband; Alan White; Shane Theriot; Francis Dunnery; Tom Brislin
- Website: synmusic.net

The Syn are an English band that were active from 1965 to 1967, and then reunited as a progressive rock band in 2004. The band was founded by Steve Nardelli, Chris Squire, Andrew Pryce Jackman, Martyn Adelman and John Painter. Chris Welch, in his book, Close to the Edge: The Story of Yes wrote, "The Syn were very similar to Yes in fact. It was very much a precursor of Yes."

== Early years ==
The Selfs were a rhythm and blues band formed in 1964 in Wembley, London. The band was formed of bassist Chris Squire, keyboardist Andrew Pryce Jackman, drummer Martyn Adelman, and guitarist John Wheatley, and singer Chris Slater. A future line-up included drummer Mike Richardson. The band played their first gigs at The Graveyard, a youth club at St. Andrew's church in Kingsbury, and Blackbirds Cross in Wembley. In 1964, they took part in Ready Steady Win, a music competition run by the producers of the music television show Ready Steady Go! They were beaten in a heat of the competition by the eventual winners, the Bo Street Runners. The Selfs recorded an acetate "Love You" and a cover of the Who's "I Can't Explain".

The roots of The Syn are in an earlier north London R&B band called High Court including Steve Nardelli on guitar and his school friend George Arzymanow on vocals. The band evolved over time and, in 1965, with Nardelli now handling lead vocals and John Painter on guitar, they changed their name to The Syn.

Shortly after, however, in 1965, The Syn merged with The Selfs, so Nardelli and Painter were joined by Chris Squire (bass), Andrew Jackman (keys) and Martyn Adelman (drums). The band's first gig, at Nardelli's school, Kingsbury County Grammar School, included covers of "Heat Wave" and The Marvelettes' "I'll Keep On Holding On". Paul Korda produced his composition "Merry-go-round" as a demonstration record for the band.

== Psychedelic period ==
John Painter was replaced by Peter Banks and Martyn Adelman was replaced by Icelandic drummer Gunnar Jökull Hákonarson (born 13 May 1949, Reykjavík, Iceland; died 22 September 2001) usually referred to as Gunnar Jökull or Jökullinn (literally meaning Jökull "glacier"). The band also hired a new manager, Peter Huggett, former bass player with Lonnie Donegan. Huggett was later replaced by Kenny Bell as manager.

The band moved away from R&B covers and started writing their own material, led by Jackman and Nardelli. Reflecting the musical changes going on around them, they became more influenced by psychedelic music. They released two singles titled Created by Clive (b/w Grounded) and Flowerman (b/w 14 Hour Technicolour Dream) in 1967. Music journalist Phil Smee has placed the Syn's "Grounded" in his top 50 freakbeat tracks, a retrospective label describing intense and raw music in the transition from British beat and rhythm and blues to psychedelia.

In 1967, they played in support of The Jimi Hendrix Experience at the Marquee Club in London, attended by many notable rock musicians (including The Beatles) that introduced Hendrix to the music world. The Syn went on to have a long-running residency at the club, supporting bands including Pink Floyd, The Moody Blues, Cat Stevens and Procol Harum before establishing their own weekly headline night at which they launched their Gangster and Flowerman rock operas.

Later line-ups saw a number of different drummers play after Hákonarson returned to Iceland.

== Aftermath ==
The band split up in 1967. Both Squire and Banks then joined Mabel Greer's Toyshop which was eventually renamed Yes.

Nardelli, Jackman and sometimes Squire also worked together after the band split up. Nardelli and Jackman recorded a planned further Syn single, entitled "Sunshine and Make Believe", with session appearances by Tony Kaye on keys and David O'List on guitar. Tapes for this session could not be located in 2004. Jackman recorded another Syn piece with an orchestra, "The Last Performance of the Royal Regimental Very Victorious and Valiant Band", eventually released on the 2004 compilation Original Syn. Another Syn piece, "Mr White's White Flying Machine", was released in 1970 by Ayshea in a session produced by Jackman and with Squire on bass.

Jackman continued to work with Squire, including on his first solo album Fish Out of Water and on Yes's Tormato. Squire has emphasised Jackman's role on Fish Out of Water, saying he offered him co-writing credits, but Jackman declined.

== Reunion ==
The Syn reunion grew out of two events. In 2003, Martyn Adelman contacted the webmaster of a Yes fan site and agreed to do an interview. Steve Nardelli saw this and was put back in touch with Adelman. With Banks too, they met up for lunch and discussed a reunion. Around the same time, Andrew Jackman died, and there was a desire to mark his passing.

In 2004, the new band started rehearsals. Banks had brought in keyboard player Gerard Johnson, with whom he had worked on several previous projects. John Wetton was originally to have played bass, but pulled out at the last minute and was replaced by Steve Gee (bassist in progressive rock band Landmarq). The sessions produced new versions of old Syn songs "Illusion" and "Grounded" and an extended new version of Yes' song "Time and a Word". Recordings were carried out at the studio owned by guitarist Paul Stacey. However, Banks did not continue with the group, and gave an explanation on his web site.

Nardelli continued with the band and, in late 2004, he and Johnson had begun recording on a new song "Cathedral of Love" when Nardelli asked Squire if he could play on the tune. Squire did and went on to join the band. Paul Stacey became the guitarist and his twin Jeremy Stacey, the drummer. Adelman had chosen to step away from performing, although he remained associated with the band for a period as a photographer—photography rather than drumming having been his career for over 30 years.

The band released their first full studio album Syndestructible in October 2005, with Cathedral of Love coming out beforehand as a single. The lineup of musicians performing on that album is

- Paul Stacey - guitars, engineer, co-producer
- Gerard Johnson - keyboards, co-producer
- Steve Nardelli - vocals
- Jeremy Stacey - drums
- Chris Squire - bass, backing vocals

An interviewer at the MWE3 website described Syndestructible as "one of the best prog-rock albums of the new century" and "a masterpiece of beat-prog". Richie Unterberger for Allmusic said, "It's rather like hearing a slightly middle-of-the-road version of Yes, with plenty of multi-sectioned song structures and progressive rock interplay between the instruments. [...] It's well executed and well recorded. But it should have been credited to Steve Nardelli and Chris Squire, or a different band name than Syn, as the links to the '60s Syn sound are virtually absent."

The More Drama Tour, scheduled to begin in North America in August 2005, was to have seen three acts, The Syn, White and Steve Howe touring together, with Squire, Howe, White and Geoff Downes playing Yes material at the end of the evening (with either Steve Nardelli or Kevin Currie of White handling lead vocals). However, the tour was cancelled shortly before it was due to begin. The Syn line-up for the tour was to have comprised:

- Francis Dunnery - guitars
- Gerard Johnson - keyboards
- Steve Nardelli - vocals
- Gary Husband - drums
- Chris Squire - bass

The Syn album line-up debuted live at a show in London at the end of 2005 (assisted by Husband), but for live dates in January 2006, the band was:

- Steve Nardelli - vocals
- Chris Squire - bass guitar
- Gerard Johnson - keyboards
- Shane Theriot - guitar
- Alan White - drums

A UK tour in May that year was cancelled and, on 16 May 2006, Squire announced his departure from the group: "Chris has decided to leave the Syn, and is no longer involved with that band despite reports to the contrary."

Nardelli assembled an album, Armistice Day, combining a new studio track ("Armistice Day", recorded with Johnson and P. Stacey) with live work from 2006 recorded at XM radio studios in Washington DC(with Steve Nardelli, Chris Squire, Alan White, Gerard Johnson and Shane Theriot). Although Johnson recorded and mixed the track, he said he was never paid for his work. In an 18 October 2006 message on Yesworld.com, Chris Squire discouraged fans from purchasing the album. The album was released without the permission of any of the artists, other than Nardelli. Both Johnson and P. Stacey left the band. While a release date in November 2006 was initially announced, legal action saw the album delayed until 2007.

Johnson and the Stacey brothers continued to work with Squire. Chris Squire, Gerard Johnson and Jeremy Stacey worked with two of Andrew Jackman's brothers (Jeremy Jackman and Gregg Jackman) on Chris Squire's Swiss Choir album, while Squire, Johnson and both Staceys began working on another Squire solo project. Work on this stalled, but Jeremy Stacey appeared on the debut album from Squackett, with Squire and Steve Hackett. The Squackett album and two Yes albums (Fly from Here and Heaven & Earth) include material co-written by Squire and Johnson and others.

== New line ups ==
In June 2007, Nardelli said, "The Syn today is me and the musicians I chose to play with." Nardelli formed a new Syn line up in 2008, as follows:

- Steve Nardelli - vocals
- Francis Dunnery - guitars
- Tom Brislin - keyboards

The band recorded a new album, Big Sky, released early 2009, with Brett Kull and Paul Ramsey, both of the band echolyn, and Dorie Jackson. Big Sky was voted the best progressive rock album of 2009 at USA Progressive Music website.

In October 2008, Umbrello Music Entertainment released a digital track written by Nardelli for the musicians from The Syn fan forum called "Reasons and Rituals". Band members included Steve Nardelli (vocals/guitars), Steve Sikes-Nova (vocals), Cary Clouser (flute), Steve Nicholas (keys), Kevin Stills (guitars/mixing), Brett Kull (guitars) and Kelly Child (drums). The executive producer for the project was radio station host and teacher Steve Sikes-Nova. The project was named 14 Hour Technicolour Dream V-Band after the Nardelli/Jackman written Syn track.

A US tour began (with Nardelli, Dunnery, Brislin, Kull, Ramsey, Jackson and Jamie Bishop) in April 2009, including 2 days of music workshops and charity concerts for the students at Gloucester High School in Virginia, but was cancelled after 6 dates when Nardelli had to return to England following the creation of his eco town project being accepted by the UK Government, with the band breaking up acrimoniously as a result. The final performance was on 1 May 2009 at Rosfest and was recorded for future release, scheduled for 27 April 2015. Kull commented on the end of the tour, saying:

Yep, the tour has been cancelled. Paul, and I are no longer playing in the Syn nor having anything to do with it. Bad organization, bad mojo, bad energy.

— Brett Kull, Post to official echolyn mailing list, 5 May 2009

Kull, Ramsey, Brislin and Bishop went on to work with Dunnery subsequently.

In December 2010, Nardelli announced a new collaboration with Swedish band Moon Safari, known for their artistic rock sound and five-part harmonies. Recording sessions began in December 2010 in Skellefteå, Sweden. The resultant new Syn album was scheduled for release in 2011. A member of Moon Safari said in October 2014 that, "The project is still in the works, but due to the work load of both parties, with Moon Safari playing live and recording new material while working day time jobs and Nardelli working on his projects outside of music, there has not been enough time left to get together and start recording for real. The tracks are done and sound fantastic, we just need to find a space in our schedules to enter the studio."

In an interview for Progzilla Radio on 25 October 2014, Nardelli confirmed final recording for the album was scheduled for early December 2014 and January 2015. He also announced the release in early 2015 of The Syn Live at Rosfest, recorded 2009, coupled with a newly commissioned movie entitled The Syn in the 21st Century. Umbrello Records announced in January 2015 that Jonas Reingold, Swedish bass player with the Flower Kings and Karmakanic, was producing the Trustworks album.

Trustworks was released in March 2016 with the vinyl version of the album to follow in August 2016.

Original guitarist John Painter died in 2016.

The vinyl edition of the Syndestructible album was released in November 2018. This included a link to a previously unseen video of the Syn at the Marquee, the only live performance by the incarnation of the musicians that recorded what has been described as one of the best albums of the 21st Century: Steve Nardelli; Chris Squire; Paul Stacey; Gerard Johnson; Jeremy Stacey.

In October 2021 Cherry Red released on their Grapefruit label a new version of the Syn early archival releases from the 60s called Flowerman - Rare Blooms From The Syn.

== Discography ==
=== Albums ===
- Original Syn YesServices Limited edition - Umbrello/2004
- Syndestructible - Umbrello/2005
- Original Syn -Umbrello/2005
- Armistice Day - Umbrello/2007
- Big Sky - Umbrello/2009
- The Syn Live Rosfest - Umbrello/2015
- Trustworks - Umbrello/2016
- Flowerman Rare Blooms From The Syn- Cherry Red/Grapefruit/2021

=== With various artists ===
- compilation: Roots of Yes 1964-68
- various artists: The Psychedelic Scene
- various artists: The Freakbeat Scene
- various artists: Rubble Collection 3
- various artists: Rubble Vol. 14, The Magic Rocking Horse
- compilation: Peter Banks Can I Play You Something? (The Pre-Yes Years Recordings from 1964–1968), 1999
- various artists: Nuggets II, 2001
- The Syn/Steve Howe/White More Drama Tour sampler

=== DVDs ===
- "Syndestructible Tour" - Umbrello/2007
- The Making of Big Sky - Umbrello/2009 (released with The Syn Live Rosfest)
- The Syn in the 21st Century - Umbrello/2015 (released with The Syn Live Rosfest)
- The Syn:Live and Raw at the Marquee 2005 -Umbrello/2018 (released as streaming bonus link with vinyl edition of Syndestructible)

=== Singles ===
- "Created By Clive" / "Grounded" - Deram/1967
- "Flowerman" / "14 Hour Technicolour Dream" - Deram/1967
- "Cathedral of Love" - Umbrello/2006
