= Fake =

Fake or fakes may refer to:

== Arts and entertainment ==
=== Film and television ===
- The Fake (1927 film), a silent British drama film
- The Fake (1953 film), a British film
- Fake (2003 film), a Thai movie
- Fake, a 2010 film featuring Fisher Stevens
- The Fake (2013 film), a South Korean animated film
- Fake (TV series), a 2024 Australian drama thriller television series
- Fakes (TV series), a 2022 American-Canadian comedy television series

=== Music ===
==== Groups ====
- Fake (Swedish band), a Swedish synthpop band active in the 1980s
- Fake, an American electro band remixed by Imperative Reaction
- Fake?, a Japanese rock musical project

==== Recordings ====
- Fake (album), by Adorable
- "Fake" (Ai song) (2010)
- "Fake" (Alexander O'Neal song) (1987)
- "Fake" (Simply Red song) (2003)
- "Fake", a song by Brand New Heavies from Brother Sister
- "Fake", a song by Brockhampton from Saturation
- "Fake", a 1994 song by Korn from Korn
- "Fake", a song by Mötley Crüe
- "Fake", a song by Five Finger Death Punch from And Justice for None
- "Fake", a song by Lauv and Conan Gray

=== Other uses in arts and entertainment ===
- Fake (manga), a BL manga
- Fake, a 1969 book by Clifford Irving about art forger Elmyr de Hory
- The Fake (play), a 1924 work by the British writer Frederick Lonsdale

== People ==
- Caterina Fake (born 1969), American entrepreneur and businesswoman
- Edie Fake (born 1980), American artist, illustrator, author and transgender activist
- Guy Leverne Fake (1879–1957), American district judge
- Kenneth H. Fake (1895–1963); American politician
- Chen Fake (1887–1957), Chinese martial artist
- Nathan Fake (born 1983), English electronic musician

== Places ==
- Fake, Nigeria, a village 90 miles from Katagum

== See also ==
- Faker (disambiguation)
- Faking (disambiguation)
- Counterfeit
