= Classic Rock series =

- The logo used in the Classic Rock series

Studio album series by London Symphony Orchestra and the Royal Choral Society
- Released: 1977–2013
- Genre: Classical rock
- Label: K-tel, Telstar, Portrait, Horizon, Union Square Music

The Classic Rock series of albums are a collection of classical crossover records by the London Symphony Orchestra and the Royal Choral Society, consisting of orchestral/choral arrangements of pop/rock songs. They began with a concert at the Royal Albert Hall in London. The first album in the series was released in 1977 with the release of Classic Rock on K-tel Records. The album was recorded at Abbey Road Studios and produced by Jeff Jarratt & Don Reedman. Andrew Pryce Jackman was the primary arranger and conductor for the series.

Year	Album title, UK record label and catalogue number	Peak chart positions		Certifications	Notes
Year	Album title, UK record label and catalogue number	UK	GER	Certifications	Notes
1977	Classic Rock; K-tel; Cat No ONE 1009	3	5	UK: Platinum	Re-released in 1989 in the UK by Telstar Records; Cat No STAR 6001
1978	Classic Rock - The Second Movement; K-tel; Cat No ONE 1039	26	3	—	Re-released in the UK on Telstar Records as Classic Rock 2 - The Second Movement; Cat No STAR 6007
1979	Classic Rock - Rhapsody In Black; K-tel; Cat No ONE 1063	34	—	UK: Gold	Re-released in 1986 in the UK on Telstar Records as Classic Rock 3 - Rhapsody In Black; Cat No TCD 6003
1981	Classic Rock - Rock Classics; K-tel; Cat No ONE 1123	5	—	UK: Gold	Re-released in 1987 (LP & cassette) & 1989 (CD) in the UK by Telstar Records as Classic Rock 4 - Rock Classics; Cat No STAC 600 (LP & cassette) / STAR 6004 (CD)
1982	The Best of Classic Rock; K-tel; Cat No ONE 1080	35	—	UK: Gold	
1983	Classic Rock - Rock Symphonies; K-tel; Cat No ONE 1243	40	6	UK: Silver:	Re-released in 1989 in the UK by Telstar Records as Classic Rock 5 - Rock Symphonies; Cat No STAR 6005; Released in Germany and Switzerland by K-tel as New Classic Rock (Cat No TG 1467) but with a different running order.
1985	The Power of Classic Rock; Portrait Records; Cat No PRT40 10049	13	14	UK: Gold	
1987	Classic Rock - Countdown; Portrait Records; Cat No MOOD 3	32	—	—	
1989	Classic Rock - The Living Years; Portrait Records; Cat No MOOD 9	51	—	UK: Silver	
1991	Wind of Change Classic Rock; Portrait Records; Cat No MOOD 19	24	—	—	
2006	Essential Classic Rock; Horizon Records; Cat No 5060083504036	—	—	—	This is a 4-CD box set of Classic Rock, Classic Rock 2 - The Second Movement, Classic Rock 3 - Rhapsody In Black, and Classic Rock 4 - Rock Classics.
2013	Simply Orchestral Rock - Music from the Classic Rock series; Union Square Music; Cat No DDSIMPLY119	—	—	—	A collection of 48 tracks with a playing time of 4 hours

== See also ==
- Hooked on Classics series
