= Umbrello Records =

Umbrello Records Limited launched in 2005 at the Cafe Royal in London. The company was formed by Steve Nardelli and Chris Squire of the psychedelic prog band The Syn. The Umbrello logo and covers for The Syn albums Syndestructible and Original Syn were designed by graphic designer Mark Bown. The label released The Syn's 2005 album Syndestructible. The company was dissolved in 2008.

Nardelli moved to New York in 2008 having purchased the Umbrello brand name and started a new, separate company based in America called Umbrello Music Entertainment with a series of new releases, including a new album from The Syn called Big Sky that was voted the best progressive rock album of 2009 by USA Progressive Music magazine. In an interview for Progzilla Radio on 25 October 2014 Steve Nardelli confirmed two new pending Umbrello releases; final recording for the new album from The Syn in collaboration with Moon Safari is scheduled for early December and January in the New Year. He also announced the release in early 2015 of The Syn Live at Rosfest album coupled with a newly commissioned movie entitled The Syn in the 21st Century.
