= Marty O'Kane =

- Origin: Folk rock, indie pop
- Years active: 2002–present
- Label: Independent

Marty O'Kane played guitar for the rock band Spiraling from 2002-2008. In 2010, Marty played guitar in April Smith's Great Picture Show for the album Songs for a Sinking Ship. In 2012, Marty debuted his solo performance at Hoboken’s Northern Soul. Marty O'Kane currently resides in Hoboken, New Jersey.

== Musical style ==
Playing instruments ranging from guitar, ukulele, accordion and sometimes bass with boyish Vocals, Marty's music is heavily influenced by Paul McCartney (Beatles) and Rush.

== Discography ==
- Transmitter (2002)
- Challenging Stage (2004)
- Time Travel Made Easy (2008)
- Songs for a Sinking Ship (2010)
