= Classic Rock (album) =

Studio album by The London Symphony Orchestra
- Released: 1 July 1978
- Genre: Classical, Rock
- Length: 51:42
- Label: K-Tel International
- Producer: Jeff Jarratt, Don Reedman

The London Symphony Orchestra chronology
Classic Rock (1978)	Classic Rock – The Second Movement (1979)

Classic Rock, produced by Jeff Jarratt and Don Reedman, is the first album in the Classic Rock series by London Symphony Orchestra. It was released on 1 July 1978 by K-Tel International, and entered the UK Albums Chart on 8 July 1978, rising to number 3 and staying in the charts for 39 weeks. The album gained platinum certification from the British Phonographic Industry on 10 November 1978. The album was recorded at EMI Abbey Road Studios on 15–16 October 1976. A further nine albums in the series followed, between 1979 and 1992.

== Track listing ==
=== Side one ===
1. "Bohemian Rhapsody" (Freddie Mercury) – 6:23
2. "Life on Mars?" (David Bowie) – 4:19
3. "A Whiter Shade of Pale" (Gary Brooker, Keith Reid) – 3:51
4. "Whole Lotta Love" (John Paul Jones, Jimmy Page, John Bonham, Robert Plant) – 4:28
5. "Paint It Black" (Mick Jagger, Keith Richards) – 5:27

=== Side two ===
1. "Nights in White Satin" (Justin Hayward) – 4:49
2. "Lucy in the Sky With Diamonds" (John Lennon, Paul McCartney) – 6:06
3. "Without You" (Thomas Evans, Peter Ham) – 3:53
4. "I'm Not in Love" (Graham Gouldman, Eric Stewart) – 7:30
5. "Sailing" (Gavin Sutherland) – 4:56

All tracks arranged and conducted by Andrew Pryce Jackman except:

- Track 3 on side 1: Arranged and conducted by Martyn Ford
- Tracks 3 & 4 on side 2: Arranged by Ann Odell, conducted by Martyn Ford

== Personnel ==
- The London Symphony Orchestra
- The Royal Choral Society
- Anthony Camden – Chairman of LSO
- Neville Taweel – Leader of LSO
- Michael De Grey
- The Rhythm Section
  - Les Hurdle
  - Clem Cattini
  - Paul Keogh
  - Nigel Jenkins
  - Ricky Hitchcock
  - Alan Parker
  - Mike Moran
  - Frank Ricotti
  - Tristan Fry
  - Chris Karan
- Peter Straker – Solo vocal on "Bohemian Rhapsody"
- David Bell – Organ solo on "A Whiter Shade of Pale"

== Charts ==
=== Weekly charts ===
Chart (1979)	Peak position
Austrian Albums (Ö3 Austria)	2
Dutch Albums (Album Top 100)	19
German Albums (Offizielle Top 100)	5
New Zealand Albums (RMNZ)	2
Swedish Albums (Sverigetopplistan)	27
UK Albums (OCC)	3

=== Year-end charts ===
Chart (1979)	Position
New Zealand Albums (RMNZ)	3
