= Upstage (magazine) =

Upstage was a free monthly publication founded by Gary Wien that covered arts and entertainment in New Jersey, US. Each issue covered music, art, film, theatre, dance, poetry, literature and comedy. The magazine first appeared in October 2003 and was distributed in New Brunswick, Princeton, Trenton, Red Bank, Long Branch, Asbury Park, Woodbridge, Rahway and Point Pleasant. In 2006, Upstage partnered with Black Potatoe Entertainment and expanded to a statewide publication and distribution. The magazine received an Asbury Music Award for Top Music Publication and ceased publication in 2008. It was succeeded by New Jersey Stage, an online music magazine edited and published by Gary Wien.
