= Bob Hart (bassist) =

American musician

Bob Hart is a multi-instrumentalist currently living in Brooklyn, New York. He is a member of the chamber-pop band Clare & the Reasons, and has played with Debbie Harry (Blondie), Van Dyke Parks, Spiraling and others.
