= Miming in instrumental performance =

Musicians pretending to play their instruments in a live show

Miming in instrumental performance or finger-synching is the act of musicians pretending to play their instruments in a live show, audiovisual recording or broadcast. Miming in instrument playing is the musical instrument equivalent of lip-syncing in singing performances, the action of pretending to sing while a prerecorded track of the singing is sounding over a PA system or on a TV broadcast or in a movie. In some cases, instrumentalists will mime playing their instruments, but the singing will be live. In some cases, the instrumentalists are miming playing their instruments and the singers are lip-synching while a backing track plays. As with lip-synching, miming instrument playing has been criticized by some music industry professionals and it is a controversial practice.

Not all miming is criticized; when a band appears in a music video, there are often no microphones on the stage and the guitars are not plugged in. With music videos, it is generally accepted that the audience is not seeing the band playing live (the exception is live concert videos).

Miming instrument playing is mostly associated with popular music and rock music performances in huge venues, TV broadcasts, music videos and films. However, there are cases where classical chamber music groups (e.g. A string quartet) or orchestras have mimed playing their instruments while a prerecorded track of the music sounds over a PA system or on a TV broadcast or film.

== Terminology ==
The miming of the playing of a musical instrument also called finger-synching, is analogous lip-synching.

== Examples ==
=== Classical music ===
Alfred Schnittke has the soloist mime a "cadenza visuale" in his Violin Concerto No. 4 twice, and George Crumb has all 3 players mime in Vox Balaenae for special effect.

A notable example of miming includes John Williams' piece at US President Obama's inauguration, which was a recording made two days earlier, then played back over speakers and mimed by musicians Yo-Yo Ma (cello) and Itzhak Perlman (violin). The musicians wore earpieces to hear the playback.

On February 10, 2006, Luciano Pavarotti appeared during a performance of the opera aria "Nessun Dorma" at the 2006 Winter Olympics opening ceremony in Turin, Italy, at his final performance. In the last act of the opening ceremony, his performance received the longest and loudest ovation of the night from the international crowd. Leone Magiera, the conductor who directed the performance, revealed in his 2008 memoirs, Pavarotti Visto da Vicino, that the performance was prerecorded weeks earlier. As the recording played during the broadcast, "[t]he orchestra pretended to play for the audience, I pretended to conduct and Luciano pretended to sing. The effect was wonderful," he wrote. Pavarotti's manager, Terri Robson, said that the tenor had turned the Winter Olympic Committee's invitation down several times because it would have been impossible to sing late at night in the sub-zero conditions of Turin in February. The committee eventually persuaded him to take part by pre-recording the song and miming during the broadcast.

Classical singing group Il Divo appeared in 2012 with the Atlanta Symphony Orchestra, but "...what the audience heard over the sound system was not the Atlanta Symphony Orchestra" playing live; it was "prerecorded audio tracks by an entirely different orchestra" that sounded over the speakers. The real "...orchestra was relegated to the role of visual window dressing", as the players pretended to play in "pantomime."

=== Popular music ===
The Eurovision Song Contest has banned lip-synching during the broadcasts. However, "musical instruments have to form part of the pre-recorded track, which means [instrumentalists] are effectively mim[ing]" the playing of their instruments during the TV broadcast.

==== United Kingdom ====
When the Beatles performed on the TV show Thank Your Lucky Stars in 1963, the guitar and bass were not plugged in and there were no microphones on the stage, so the band was miming their instrument playing and lip-syncing the vocals.

Initially, bands performing on the UK TV show Top of the Pops mimed to the commercially released record, but in 1966 after discussions with the Musicians' Union, miming was banned. After a few weeks during which some bands' attempts to play live were somewhat lacking, a compromise was reached whereby a specially recorded backing track was permitted as long as all of the musicians on the track were present in the studio. The TOTP Orchestra, led by Johnny Pearson, augmented the tracks when necessary. This setup continued until 1980, when a protracted Musicians' Union strike resulted in the dropping of the live orchestra altogether and the use of prerecorded tracks only. This accounts for a number of acts who never appeared on the show because of their reluctance to perform in this way.

Highlights have included Jimi Hendrix who, on hearing someone else's track being played by mistake (in the days of live broadcast), mumbled "I don't know the words to that one, man," a drunken performance of "Fairytale of New York" by Shane MacGowan of the Pogues, a performance of "Roll with It" by Oasis in which Noel and Liam Gallagher exchanged roles and BBC DJ John Peel's appearance as the mandolin soloist for Rod Stewart on "Maggie May."

The Top of the Pops miming policy occasionally led to unintended consequences, such as in 1988 when All About Eve appeared for the song "Martha's Harbour" and the televised audience could hear the song but the band could not. As the opening verse began, unwitting lead singer Julianne Regan remained silent on a stool on stage while Tim Bricheno (the only other band member present) did not play his guitar. An unseen stagehand apparently prompted them that something was wrong in time for them to mime along to the second verse. The band were invited back the following week, and chose to sing live. When British pop group Take That performed on Top of the Pops as well as several other TV programs, they would occasionally mime to their pre-recorded backing tracks. This practice continued with upcoming artists such as Robbie Williams (who left Take That in 1995) and Gary Barlow. However, following the return of Williams in 2010, the band have only sung live.

Violinist Natalie Holt threw eggs at Simon Cowell, the creator of Britain's Got Talent, in what she called a "... protest because she was angry that backing musicians don’t play live." Holt said that she "... took a stand against people miming on TV and against Simon Cowell and his dreadful influence on the music industry." A spokesperson for the show told reporters that miming is "standard practice for backing musicians during TV performances as it isn’t possible to easily capture the quality of the sound in a live broadcast environment."

==== United States ====
During Whitney Houston's performance of "The Star-Spangled Banner" with a full orchestra before Super Bowl XXV, a prerecorded version was used. Orchestra director Kathryn Holm McManus revealed in 2001: "At the game, everyone was playing, and Whitney was singing, but there were no live microphones. ... Everyone was lip synching or finger-synching."

Scottish backing singer Margo Buchanan left a 2011 Dolly Parton concert because of the extensive use of vocal and instrumental miming. She described it as "artistically dishonest and unfair to musicians who work hard at perfecting their craft," but she was unable to persuade the Musicians’ Union to become involved in lobbying to curtail the use of miming.

The Red Hot Chili Peppers drew the ire of many on social media after they performed at Super Bowl XLVIII with their instruments unplugged, which made it obvious that they were miming. Bassist Flea stated after the show that the "... band were offered no other option [other than miming] by Super Bowl organizers."

In 2011, singer Katy Perry was caught miming the recorder during a performance of "Big Pimpin'" but claimed afterward that the episode was a joke.

==== Artists intentionally showing they are miming ====
In some cases where producers have insisted that bands mime their performance on TV broadcasts, the performers have protested this practice by making it obvious that they are not playing live.

Before Frank Zappa appeared live on Detroit TV in 1966, the producer threatened the band to "Lip-sync your hit—or else." Zappa went to the TV studio's props department, "gathered an assortment of random objects and built a set" and instructed each band member to perform repeated physical movements during the mimed song (though not in time with the music).

The band Blue Cheer performed on American Bandstand in 1968, deliberately miming out of sync with their song "Summertime Blues".

When progressive rock band Marillion played on Top of the Pops in 1983, the show's producer Michael Hurll insisted that the band pretend to play and sing while the recording played on air. However, lead singer Fish kept his mouth closed and made a gesture when the line "I'm miming" played.

When Iron Maiden appeared on German TV in 1986, they were not allowed to play live. The band made it clear that they were pretending to play and passed instruments around as a recording of their song "Wasted Years" played on the broadcast. The band swapped instruments; drummer Nicko McBrain moved out from "behind the drums to take center stage for the chorus, and he’s handed a bass [to pretend to play], and Harris winds up behind the drums... At one point, three members are playing drums simultaneously, McBrain puts his hands on Adrian Smith’s guitar neck [strings] in the middle of the solo."

For more than 40 years, major bands and artists appeared on the UK show Top of the Pops, with the producers insisting that the performers would either "lip-sync or sing along with a prerecorded backing track" for the TV broadcast. In 1984, Morrissey "sang" into a fern instead of a microphone for "This Charming Man." When Nirvana was not allowed play their instruments live on Top of the Pops, singer/guitarist Kurt Cobain did not pretend to play his instrument as the prerecorded played on the broadcast.

When Muse performed on the Italian TV show Quelli che... il Calcio, the producers insisted that the band mime along while the recording played on air. "Infuriated" at the requirement to pretend to play, the band "swapped instruments with [lead vocalist and guitarist] Matt Bellamy sitting behind the drums" and pretending to be the group's drum kit player. Muse also mimed on BBC TV, when the producers insisted that the band pretend to play their instruments and lip-synch the vocals. "...Bellamy spends the piano intro gliding his hands over the keys randomly", not near the actual notes, and then "...starts waving his hands in the air, nowhere near the keys he’s supposed to be playing". Then [Bellamy] does not touch his guitar while a "rapid guitar section plays out of the speakers" and drummer Dominic Howard pretends to strum the bass he took from the actual bass player.

When UK artists Disclosure appeared at the Capital FM Summertime Ball, the producers "allowed the vocalists to sing [live], but required the backing tracks to be pre-recorded in order to sync with their visual display." Group member Guy Lawrence stated that the musicians took intentional steps to make it clear to the audience that they were being forced to mime their audio mixing and that the group left the DJ gear unplugged into the AC mains, left the phono jacks unplugged, and did not bring their headphones onstage.

== Reception and impact ==
After the Milli Vanilli miming scandal, it "...forever embedded skepticism into the minds (and ears) of the listener." In the fallout of this miming controversy, MTV's Unplugged series was launched, "a showcase for artists wanting to prove they were more than just studio creations". As the show used live performances with singers and acoustic instruments, it required performers to "...display their unembellished voices and ability to perform live." On MTV unplugged, artists could not use lip-syncing, backup tracks, synthesizers, and racks of vocal effects. With Unplugged, authenticity in live performances again became an important value in popular music. During a DJ tour for the release of the French group Justice, A Cross the Universe in November 2008, controversy arose when a photograph of Augé DJing with an unplugged Akai Professional MPD24 surfaced. The photograph sparked accusations that Justice's live sets were faked. Augé has since said that the equipment was unplugged very briefly before being reattached and the band put a three-photo set of the incident on their Myspace page.

Ellie Goulding and Ed Sheeran have called for honesty in live shows by joining the "Live Means Live" campaign, which was launched by songwriter/composer David Mindel. Bands display the "Live Means Live" logo to indicate to the audience that "there’s no Auto-Tune, nothing that isn’t 100 per cent live" in the show, and that there are no backing tracks.

== See also ==
- Lip-syncing
- Backing track
- Auto-Tune
- Offstage musicians and singers in popular music
