= Rickenbacker 4001CS =

Electric bass guitar

- Manufacturer: Rickenbacker
- Period: 1991–2000

Construction
- Body type: Solid
- Neck joint: Unbound maple
- Scale: 33 1/2 inch

Woods
- Body: Unbound maple
- Neck: Maple and Walnut
- Fretboard: African Vermilion

Hardware
- Pickup: 2 single-coil pickups (toaster neck/horseshoe bridge)

Colors available
- Cream Colorglo

The Rickenbacker 4001CS is a limited-edition series electric bass guitar based on Chris Squire's 1964 Rickenbacker 4001. Only 1,000 were made between 1991 and 2000. The 4001CS is another instrument from Rickenbacker's Limited Edition Series. These instruments, commissioned by and for prominent artists who favored Rickenbacker instruments, incorporate features which are favored by the artist or reminiscent of their most famous Rickenbacker instrument.

Squire's original bass was part of the model lineup exported to England in 1964, in the rush of the Beatles’ rise to prominence. The group's association with Rickenbackers had English musicians clamoring for the instruments. An agreement was forged with the Rose-Morris music chain in England to sell Rickenbackers, and special model features and designations were given to the instruments. In the case of the 4001 bass, the English model 1999 eschewed the stereo output, triangular neck inlays, and checkered body binding and neck binding of the American model.

The 4001CS incorporates some features associated with Squire, such as the cream finish, which is not original to his bass. Additionally, the African Vermillion fretboard and headstock wings are a feature unique to the 4001CS.

Each 4001CS bass was supplied with a silver Rickenbacker vintage-style case, and a certificate of authenticity detailing the bass’ origin, serial number, and Limited Edition sequence number.

== History ==
In 1965, while 17 and working in a music store, Chris Squire bought the RM1999 bass that he used in The Syn, Mabel Greer's Toyshop, Yes, and XYZ. The RM1999 was one of four 4001S imported to the UK. It was produced with a Fireglo (Rickenbacker's red "sunburst") finish upon which he overlaid wallpaper as decorations twice before opting to go with the cream finish, a color Rickenbacker did not produce in the 1960s. When Squire took this bass to his local luthier to remove the wallpaper decorations, the body was shaved down both times (the second of which the luthier advised Squire against doing again), removing some wood in the process and resulting in the bass having a brighter sound than most stock models.

In 1990, during an interview on Star Licks, Squire announced that Rickenbacker would release a copied version of his bass that closely replicated the tone of his own instrument. However, in an interview for Premier Guitar Magazine in 2014, he would admit that it didn't sound anything like his own. Despite that, he had kept a few of them as backup instruments, including one bass with a custom finish based on the cover of his solo album Fish Out of Water.
