= Fish Out of Water (Chris Squire album) =

Studio album by Chris Squire
- Released: 21 November 1975
- Recorded: Spring and summer 1975
- Studios: New Pipers (Virginia Water, Surrey, England) Morgan Studios (London, England)
- Genres: Symphonic rock; progressive rock
- Length: 42:30
- Label: Atlantic
- Producer: Chris Squire

Chris Squire chronology
Fish Out of Water (1975)	Chris Squire's Swiss Choir (2007)

Singles from Fish Out of Water
- 1. "Lucky Seven" Released: 1 March 1976 (US)

Fish Out of Water is the debut solo album by English bassist and songwriter Chris Squire, released in November 1975 by Atlantic Records. The album was recorded during a period in which each band member of Yes had taken downtime to produce a solo album. Some of the musicians Squire hired for the project were former Yes drummer Bill Bruford, then-Yes keyboardist Patrick Moraz, King Crimson saxophonist Mel Collins and Canterbury scene flautist Jimmy Hastings. Squire's former bandmate in the Syn, Andrew Pryce Jackman, played piano and orchestrated the material.

Fish Out of Water reached No. 25 in the UK and No. 69 in the U.S. Despite its being well received by critics, Squire would not record another solo album until 2007, releasing an album which consists of traditional Christmas music entitled Chris Squire's Swiss Choir, thus making this Squire's only album of original material.

== Production ==
=== Background and recording ===
In early 1975, between the US and UK legs of Yes's tour in support of Relayer (1974), the band agreed to take time off for each member to record a solo album. When Squire started work on his, he contacted Andrew Pryce Jackman, a childhood friend and keyboardist/composer, who assisted with the album's conception and orchestration. Over the course of their collaboration, Jackman also contributed significantly to the writing. Squire offered to give him co-writing credits, but Jackman declined.

Fish Out of Water was recorded in the spring and summer of 1975 in two studios: New Pipers, Chris Squire's home studio in Surrey, and Morgan Studios in London. The title refers to his nickname "Fish", and being "...Out of Water" due to making music without Yes for the first time.

=== Songs ===
The introduction to "Hold Out Your Hand" features a passage played on the pipe organ at St Paul's Cathedral by cathedral organist Barry Rose, who had known Squire and Jackman during their boyhoods. The organ continues throughout the song, reflecting Squire and Jackman's experiences together as church choristers. The title of "Lucky Seven" refers to the song being in a 7/8 time signature. A melodic passage from Yes's song "Close to the Edge" appears in the finale of "Safe (Canon Song)". The closing passage on "Safe" was played on the 4-string bass section of a double-neck guitar, using only the pickups of the 6-string guitar section.

== Release ==
Professional ratings
Review scores
Source	Rating
AllMusic	4.5/5 stars

Fish Out of Water was released in November 1975. "Lucky Seven" was edited into a single by producer Tom Dowd which only saw a US release. "Hold Out Your Hand" was later performed by Yes during their 1976 North American tour with Squire singing the lead vocal. One critic at the concert wrote for Circus magazine: "Some ten thousand people responded to the Squire tune with a standing ovation". To further promote the album, a promotional film of "Hold Out Your Hand" and "You by My Side" was made in a studio; it featured mimed performances, with Bill Bruford, Patrick Moraz and Andrew Pryce Jackman appearing on their respective instruments in front of a small orchestra and against a white background. The orchestra was composed of players from the London Symphony Orchestra, who were on their way to record for another project. Squire could only afford a short amount of their time (roughly half an hour, which cost £3,000).

"Silently Falling" is sampled on "Falling Down" by New Zealand DJ and producer P-Money on his album Everything (2010).

=== Reissues and sequel ===
In a 2004 interview, Squire said that he wished to produce a 5.1 surround sound mix of the album using the master tapes, but declared the recordings had disappeared from Atlantic's archives. On 28 February 2006, it was reissued in the US by Wounded Bird Records. This was followed in August 2007 by a two-disc "Deluxe Expanded Edition" released on Squire's own label, Stone Ghost Records, (distributed by Castle/Sanctuary Records). The set included bonus material: a single edit of "Lucky Seven", the promotional film for "Hold Out Your Hand" and "You by My Side", track-by-track commentary, and a 40-minute interview with Squire conducted in November 2006.

Squire never recorded a follow-up, although he said he was frequently asked about such a project. He had hoped to reunite with Jackman and work on one together, but such plans ended following Jackman's death in 2003. In 2012, he reasoned much of the album's appeal and the strength of its music was down to his collaboration with Jackman. Though Squire had started to prepare pieces for more solo albums, he consistently found himself utilizing this material for band projects, including those with Billy Sherwood and Steve Hackett.

In 2018, a 7-disc deluxe edition was released, containing all of the previously available material plus new 5.1 and stereo mixes. In 2020, a one-disc blu-ray edition was released.

== Track listing ==
All tracks written, arranged and produced by Chris Squire.

Side one
No.	Title	Length
1.	"Hold Out Your Hand"	4:13
2.	"You by My Side"	5:00
3.	"Silently Falling"	11:27

Side two
No.	Title	Length
4.	"Lucky Seven"	6:54
5.	"Safe (Canon Song)"	14:56

2018 Deluxe box set edition bonus tracks
No.	Title	Length
6.	"Lucky Seven (Single version)"	3:29
7.	"Silently Falling (Single version)"	2:59
8.	"Run with the Fox"	4:11
9.	"Return of the Fox"	4:02

"Return of the Fox" is the B-side for Chris Squire & Alan White's single "Run with the Fox" (1981). Both tracks are written by Chris Squire, Alan White & former King Crimson lyricist Peter Sinfield.

== Personnel ==
Credits are adapted from the album's UK and US release liner notes.

Musicians

- Chris Squire – lead and backing vocals, bass guitar, 12-string guitar (tracks 3 and 5), drums (track 2)
- Andrew Pryce Jackman – acoustic and electric pianos, orchestration, conductor
- Bill Bruford – drums, percussion
- Mel Collins – tenor saxophone (track 3), alto & soprano saxophones (track 4)
- Jimmy Hastings – flute (track 2)
- Patrick Moraz – bass synthesiser, organ (track 3)
- Barry Rose – pipe organ (track 1)
- Julian Gaillard – strings leader
- John Wilbraham – brass leader
- Jim Buck – horns leader
- Adrian Bett – woodwinds leader
- Nikki Squire – backing vocals (track 1)
- Alan White – drums (tracks 8 and 9)

Production

- Chris Squire – producer
- Greg Jackman – engineer
- Nigel Luby – assistant engineer
- Laurence Bernes – cover design and photography
- Phil Carson – overdubs, mastering
- Trevor Spencer – mastering
- Graham Preskett – mastering
- Brian Lane – front cover Polaroid photograph
- Peter Sinfield – suggestions for "Safe (Canon Song)"
- Trevor Spencer – finishing touches
- Graham Presket – finishing touches

== Charts ==
Chart (1975–76)	Peak position
UK Albums (Official Charts)	25
US Billboard 200	69

Chart (2018)	Peak position
Scottish Albums (Official Charts)	86
UK Independent Albums (Official Charts)	17
UK Rock & Metal Albums (Official Charts)	8

== Certifications ==
Region	Certification	Certified units/sales
United Kingdom (BPI)	Silver	60,000^{^}
^{^} Shipments figures based on certification alone.
