= Gerard Johnson (musician) =

British keyboard player (born 1963)

- Born: 1963 (age 62–63)
- Instrument: Keyboards

Gerard Mark Johnson (born 1963) is a British keyboard player. He is best known for his work with Saint Etienne, The Syn and Yes.

== Early years ==
Johnson was born in Newport, Monmouthshire, Wales. He was educated at Presentation College, Reading, Berkshire, England. He was a member of the Progress Theatre Student Group (1976–1981) and studied as a Tonmeister at the University of Surrey, Guildford.

== Career ==
Johnson originally trained and worked as a recording engineer at London's Music Works studio (1985–87) and then as Chief Engineer at Orinoco Studios (1987–91). During this time he recorded and mixed records by Enya, Ian McCulloch (of Echo & the Bunnymen), The Sugarcubes and the Pet Shop Boys.

In 1991, he became a freelance engineer/producer, working with Timo Blunk (of Palais Schaumburg), Freaky Realistic, TV Smith (of The Adverts) and Denim. Through Denim he met Bob Stanley, Pete Wiggs and Sarah Cracknell of Saint Etienne. Since Saint Etienne re-united in the mid 1990s, Johnson has worked with the band at various times as engineer, arranger, producer and live keyboard player.

In the 1990s, Johnson also worked with guitarist Peter Banks, with Johnson appearing on Banks' albums and Banks guesting on Johnson's project with Mark Bown, Funky Monkey. In 2004, Johnson joined Banks in The Syn, appearing on recordings later released on Original Syn. Johnson stayed with the band after Banks left and original bass player Chris Squire of Yes rejoined. He co-produced the band's 2005 album, Syndestructible, with Lemon Trees guitarist Paul Stacey. He has also toured with The Syn in a line-up including guitarist Shane Theriot and drummer Alan White (of Yes), but left the band in 2006.

He then worked on two projects with Chris Squire: Chris Squire's Swiss Choir, an album of Christmas music on which he was producer and choral arranger, and as co-writer of songs for a planned Squire solo album. This project was not completed, but material from it went on to form part of the album A Life Within A Day album by Squire and former Genesis guitarist, Steve Hackett, working as Squackett. One song from these sessions, "The Man You Always Wanted Me to Be", was used on Yes's 2011 album Fly from Here, co-written and performed by Johnson. Another idea from the sessions was used in "The Game" on Yes's next album, 2014's Heaven & Earth.

Johnson returned to Saint Etienne as orchestral arranger and conductor of their June 2007 live film soundtrack performance This Is Tomorrow, part of the celebrations which marked the re-opening of London's Royal Festival Hall after its closure for extensive refurbishment. He toured extensively with Saint Etienne during 2009 and continues to work with the band.

He has since formed The Electric Opera with long-term collaborator Mark Bown, and composed for and directed numerous shows at the South London Theatre.
