= Pub (Denzil album) =

Studio album by Denzil
- Released: 1994
- Recorded: 1993
- Studio: Jacobs (Surrey), Parklands (Hampshire)
- Genre: Rock; power pop
- Label: Giant Records (US), BMG (UK)
- Producer: Steve Ennever

Professional ratings
Review scores
Source	Rating
AllMusic	4.5/5 stars

Pub is the only album by the British band Denzil, released in 1994.

== Critical reception ==
Billboard praised the "clever" lyrics and "charmingly rough-edged" singing. The Washington Post declared that "every one of the 16 songs on Pub boasts an ear-catching melody driven by an energetic, economical rhythm section." Ira Robbins of Trouser Press found Denzil to be "a welcome entrant in the English furrow between early Elvis Costello and late Richard Thompson", praising the "memorable tunes ... tastefully backed by an electric trio".

In a retrospective review for AllMusic, Andy Hinds gave the album a positive review and stated, "Based around Denzil's everyman voice and workmanlike acoustic guitar, the well-recorded tunes are usually augmented by drums, bass, jangly electric guitar, and other well-chosen instruments. This excellent album and artist were nearly completely overlooked."

In 1999, The Tulsa World included Pub on their list of the "100 Greatest Albums You Never Heard Of".

== Track listing ==
All songs written by Denzil Thomas.

1. "Fat Loose Fancies Me"
2. "Running This Family"
3. "Rake Around the Grave"
4. "Useless"
5. "Sunday Service Hengistbury Head"
6. "Too Scared to Be True"
7. "Bastard Son of Elvis"
8. "Funnymoon"
9. "Shame"
10. "Who Made You So Cynical About Me?"
11. "Autistic"
12. "If Only Alan Won the Pools"
13. "Seven Years in These Boots"
14. "Your Sister Song"
15. "Cutie"
16. "Goodnight Darling"

== Personnel ==
- Denzil – vocals, acoustic guitar
- Steve Ennever – bass, harmonica
- Craig Boyd – guitar
- Andrew Place – drums

Additional musicians

- Tich – fiddle
- Jo Garret – additional vocals
- Jeremy Stacey – drums

Technical

- Steve Ennever – producer
- Michael Leshay – executive producer
- Tony Cousins – mastering
- Stuart Flynn – photography
- Denzil – art direction, co-designer
- Michael Diehl – co-designer
