= Chris Squire's Swiss Choir =

Studio album by Chris Squire
- Released: 3 December 2007
- Recorded: 1981, September–October 2007
- Genres: Christmas music, choral music
- Length: 55:57
- Label: Lime Records
- Producers: Chris Squire, Gerard Johnson (Tracks 1–12); Squire, Alan White (Track 13)

Chris Squire chronology
Fish Out of Water (1975)	Chris Squire's Swiss Choir (2007)

Chris Squire's Swiss Choir is the second and final solo album by Chris Squire. An album of traditional Christmas music, it was released in 2007 and includes former Genesis guitarist Steve Hackett, future King Crimson drummer and keyboardist Jeremy Stacey and the English Baroque Choir.

All tracks were arranged by Chris Squire and Gerard Johnson.

== Track listing ==
No.	Title	Writer(s)	Length
1.	"Adam Lay Ybounden"	Traditional	4:48
2.	"I Saw Three Ships"	Traditional	4:05
3.	"O come, O come, Emmanuel"	Traditional	4:29
4.	"Silent Night/Night of Silence"	Franz Xaver Gruber, Joseph Mohr/Daniel Kantor	5:16
5.	"Ding Dong Merrily on High"	Thoinot Arbeau, George Ratcliffe Woodward	4:35
6.	"The Three Kings"	Peter Cornelius	4:39
7.	"Sans Day Carol"	Traditional	4:04
8.	"Personent hodie"	Traditional	2:59
9.	"Sussex Carol"	Traditional	3:52
10.	"Gaudete"	Traditional	3:19
11.	"In the Bleak Midwinter"	Traditional	4:34
12.	"Past Three O'Clock"	Traditional	5:04
13.	"Run with the Fox"	Chris Squire, Alan White, Peter Sinfield	4:12

== Personnel ==
=== Musicians ===
- Chris Squire – bass guitar, vocals, record producer
- Steve Hackett – electric and acoustic guitars
- Gerard Johnson – keyboards
- Jeremy Stacey – drums
- English Baroque Choir – chorus
- Jeremy Jackman – vocals, musical direction
- Amy George – soprano voice
- Laura Macara – vocals
- Alan White – drums, piano, keyboards, backing vocals and record producer on "Run with the Fox".

=== Production ===
- Ivor Atkins – music arranger
- Gustav Holst – music arranger
- Gregg Jackmann – mixing
- Gerard Johnson – music arranger, engineer, mixing, record producer
- Nigel Luby – engineer

=== Cover ===
- Hugh Gilmour – photography
