= Yes, Friends and Relatives =

Compilation album by Yes
- Released: August 25, 1998
- Genre: Progressive rock
- Length: 2:19:36
- Label: Eagle - EDGCD034
- Compiler: Brian Adams for Eagle Rock Entertainment

Yes chronology
Open Your Eyes (1997)	Yes, Friends and Relatives (1998)	The Ladder (1999)

Professional ratings
Review scores
Source	Rating
Allmusic	2/5 stars

Yes, Friends and Relatives is a compilation album featuring songs of progressive rock band Yes and a selection of performances licensed from associated acts. The double CD was released in 1998. The album opens with a 1998 Jon Anderson remake of "Owner of a Lonely Heart". Yes only actually feature on two tracks, the closing track on each disc: live versions of "Close to the Edge" on disc 1 and "America" on disc 2.

== Track listing ==
Nr.	Title	Artist	Length	From album
Disc one
1	"Owner of a Lonely Heart"	Jon Anderson	3:31	None - 1998 remake
2	"Ice"	Rick Wakeman	4:50	Time Machine
3	"Red and White"	Steve Howe	3:33	Home Brew
4	"Zone of O"	Esquire	5:19	Coming Home
5	"Up North"	Earthworks & Bill Bruford	5:22	Earthworks
6	"The Pyramids of Egypt"	Rick Wakeman	7:06	Seven Wonders of the World
7	"Roundabout"	Steve Howe	2:29	Not Necessarily Acoustic
8	"Sync or Swim"	Wakeman With Wakeman	6:05	Wakeman & Wakeman
9	"Arthur"	Rick Wakeman	12:57	Live at Hammersmith
10	"Close to the Edge": The Solid Time of Change; Total Mass Retain; I Get Up, I Get Down; Seasons of Man	Yes	19:40	Keys to Ascension 2
Disc two
1	"No Expense Spared"	Wakeman With Wakeman	5:30	Wakeman & Wakeman
2	"Say"	Jon Anderson	3:47	The More You Know
3	"Walk Don't Run"	Steve Howe	3:01	Quantum Guitar
4	"Tron Thomi"	Esquire	7:52	Coming Home
5	"10 Million"	Jon Anderson	3:39	None
6	"Excerpts from Tales from Topographic Oceans": The Revealing Science of God: Dance of the Dawn; The Remembering: High the Memory; The Ancient: Giants Under the Sun; Ritual	Steve Howe	9:08	Not Necessarily Acoustic
7	"The More You Know"	Jon Anderson	3:44	The More You Know
8	"Journey"	Rick Wakeman	21:26	Live at Hammersmith
9	"America"	Yes	10:37	Keys to Ascension 1
