= Rickenbacker 4001 =

Electric bass guitar, produced 1961-1981

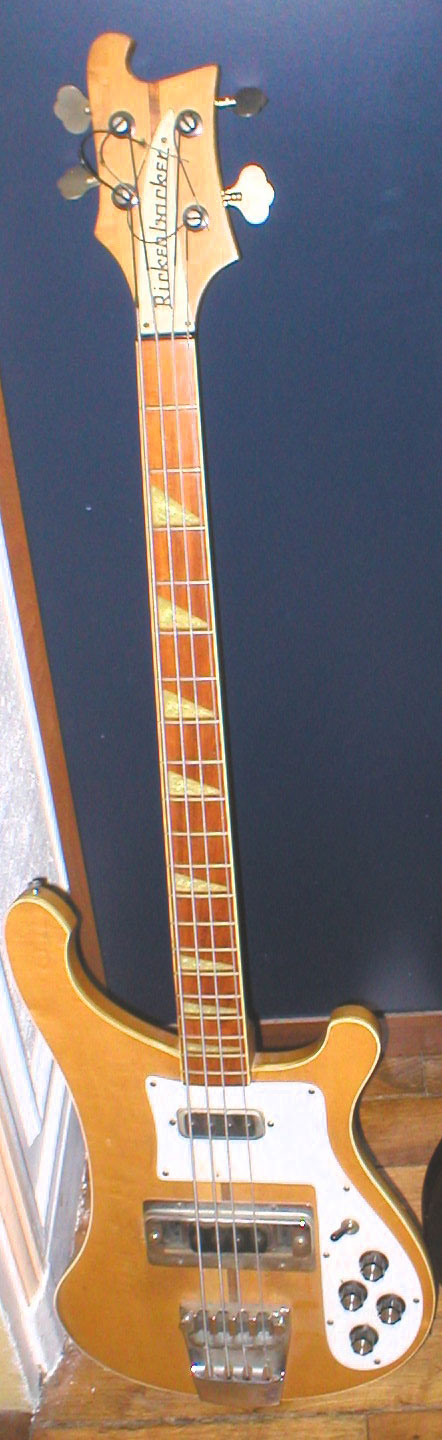
- A 1977 Rickenbacker 4001
- Manufacturer: Rickenbacker
- Period: 1961–1986

Construction
- Body type: Solid
- Neck joint: Neck-through-body
- Scale: 33.5 in (850 mm) (long scale); 30.5 in (770 mm) (short scale)

Woods
- Body: Maple
- Neck: Maple, rosewood, walnut
- Fretboard: Rosewood, maple, bubinga

Hardware
- Pickup(s): Two single-coil toaster/horseshoe pickups (early models), two single-coil Hi-Gain pickups (later models)

Colors available
- Fireglo, Autumnglo, Burgundyglo, Jetglo, Mapleglo, Azureglo

The Rickenbacker 4001 is an electric bass that was manufactured by Rickenbacker from 1961 to 1986. (Note: While nominally discontinued in the early 1980s (with sources differing on the exact year), instrument serial numbers show Rickenbacker continued to sporadically produce the 4001 until 1986.) Designer Roger Rossmeisl created the 4001 as a two-pickup "deluxe" version of Rickenbacker's first production bass, the single-pickup model 4000. The 4001 sported the same unique body shape and "crested wave" headstock of the 4000, continuing Rickenbacker's tradition of idiosyncratic designs. An aesthetically stripped-down export model, the 4001S, was released in 1964. Many notable rock bassists have played a 4001 or 4001S, including Paul McCartney, Chris Squire, Geddy Lee, Lemmy, and Cliff Burton. The 4001 was eventually superseded by the highly similar 4003, which debuted in 1980 and remains in production. Since the 4001's discontinuation, Rickenbacker has released several 4001 reissues, as well as signature models for players like Squire (Yes), Al Cisneros (Sleep and Om), and Mike Mesaros (the Smithereens).

== History ==
=== Development ===
In 1951, Fender released the music industry's first electric bass guitar, the Precision Bass, and by the mid-1950s most American guitar manufacturers had followed suit and introduced their own electric bass models to compete for this new market. Rickenbacker designed its own entry, model 4000, in 1953. Designer Roger Rossmeisl came up with the shape of the bass, factory manager Paul Barth created the hardware, and company CEO F.C. Hall developed the circuitry. The 4000 notably used new design elements like neck-through-body construction and a dual truss rod system. It featured deep cutaways; a single, wrap-around horseshoe magnet-equipped pickup; a 33.5"-scale neck with 20 frets; and a distinctive "cresting wave"-shaped headstock.

Several revisions to the design followed its initial prototypes, with the 4000 being displayed at small trade shows as early as 1955. It first appeared in sales kits in 1957 and then Rickenbacker's official price lists the following year. The 4000 retailed upon release for $279.50, which was $60 more than the rival Precision Bass. Sales were initially slow, however, and production numbers limited, but the 4000 gained steam in the late-1950s thanks in part to endorsees like James Kirkland of Ricky Nelson's band.

In 1960, Rickenbacker switched from mahogany (or walnut) for the neck-through-body to maple for added strength. This also matched the bass's glued-on maple sides, or "wings." The following year, designer Roger Rossmeisl enlarged the 4000's horns and changed their shape. He then turned to building a "deluxe" version of the 4000, adding binding to the top and using more ornate fretboard inlays. Rossmeisl's new creation inspired him to build a new production model—the 4001. The 4000 itself would remain in production until 1984.

=== 4001 ===
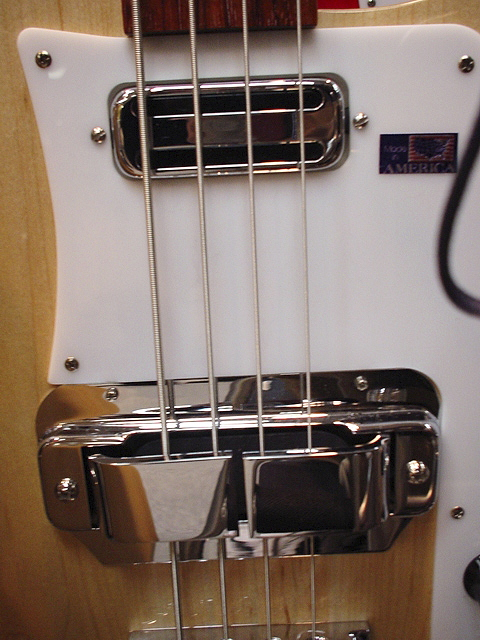
A "toaster top" neck pickup and "horseshoe" bridge pickup

Model 4001 was released in November 1961, inheriting most of the 4000's updated design elements, but with additions like a "toaster top" pickup in the neck position, additional volume and tone controls, a three-position pickup selector switch, fretboard binding, and triangular inlays, which all served to set the 4001 apart from competing bass models. It was first available in "Fireglo" finish. In 1962, Rossmeisl left Rickenbacker for Fender, and fellow builder Dick Burke took over design responsibilities: Burke subsequently introduced a new aluminum bridge and tailpiece design, reduced the body depth, and added the headstock's cresting wave profile to the top horn.

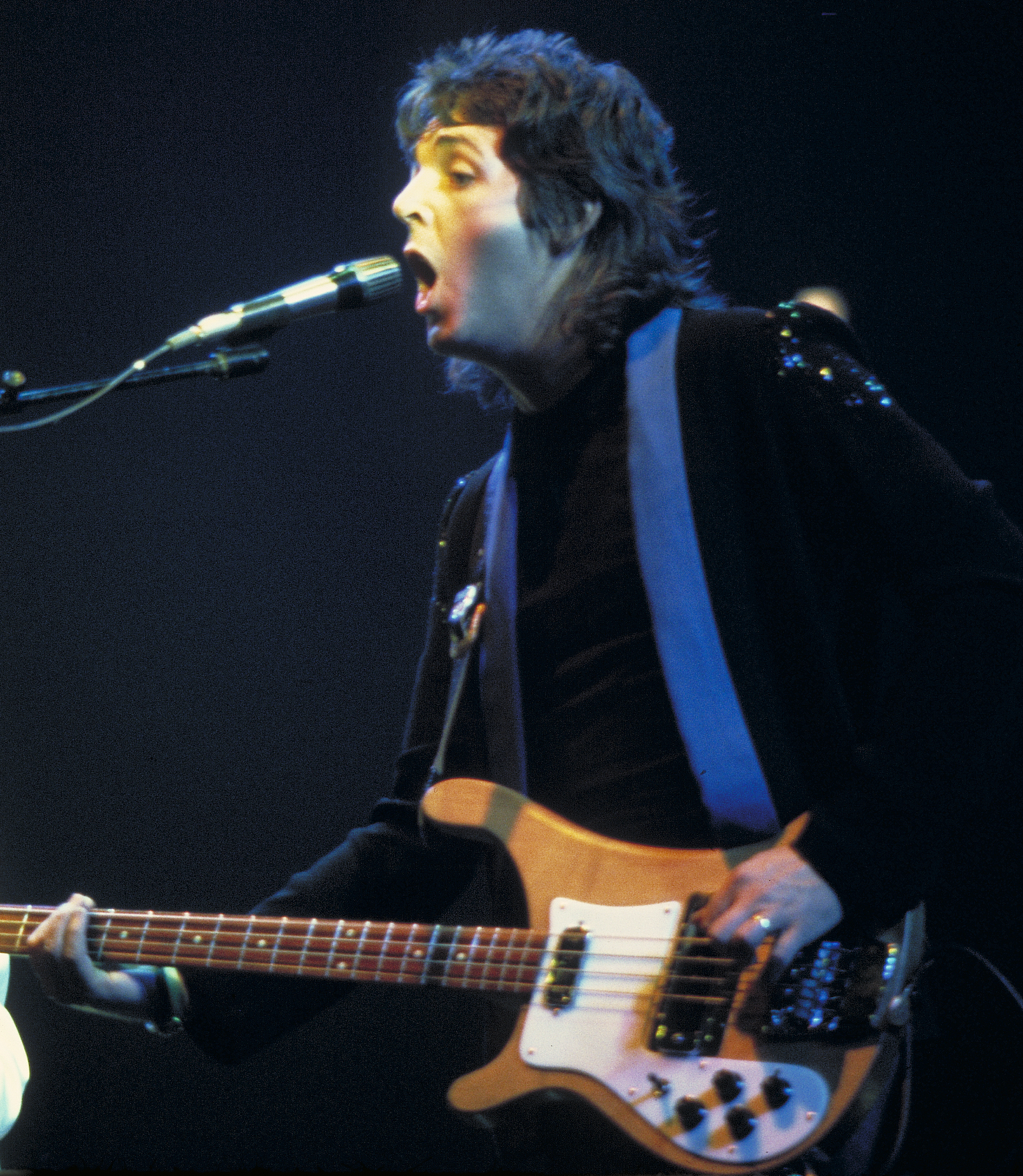
Paul McCartney playing a 4001S with Wings.

Demand for the 4001 increased steadily throughout the 1960s. Much of Rickenbacker's growing popularity was owed to the Beatles: John Lennon had been playing a model 325 guitar since 1960, while in 1965 Paul McCartney had received a left-handed model 4001S directly from Rickenbacker CEO Hall. Originally known as the "4000+1", the 4001S became available for special order in 1964 as a visually-simpler alternative to the 4001 in that it lacked binding and used dot inlays in place of triangles. London-based distributor Rose-Morris made the largest purchase of the 4001S, but used the model number "1999" for sales on the European market. Young English players like Pete Quaife of the Kinks, John Entwistle of the Who, and Roger Waters of Pink Floyd quickly switched to 1999s.

In 1968, a "Ric-O-Sound" stereo output was added alongside the standard mono jack; the original horseshoe-style bridge pickup was also replaced with a "Hi-Gain" model, but a chromed plastic cover was used to maintain a similar look to the original design. Another Hi-Gain pickup then replaced the existing neck pickup in 1973, the same year a cast zinc tailpiece was introduced.

In the 1970s, 4001 and 4001S/1999 sales were given a boost by Yes bassist Chris Squire, who popularized using roundwound strings on his 1999 to create a bright, twangy bass tone. Squire's tone inspired a number of other progressive rock bassists to use the 4001, including Geddy Lee of Rush, who bought one with his advance following the band signing its first record deal in 1974. Early punk bassists also took to the 4001, such as the Jam's Bruce Foxton and Andy Warren of Adam and the Ants. The 4001 would finish the 1970s as Rickenbacker's bestselling instrument.

In 1980, Rickenbacker released the 4003, which was aesthetically almost identical to the 4001 but used an updated truss rod system to better accommodate the use of roundwound strings, which require greater tension than the flatwound strings the 4001 had been designed for. The 4001 and 4001S were both discontinued in the early 1980s, with sources offering specific years such as 1980, 1981, and 1984. Distributor Rose-Morris had already stopped selling the 1999 in 1969, but the 4001S had continued to be available by special order. The 4001, meanwhile, continued to be produced sporadically after its nominal discontinuation, with serial numbers indicating instruments still being made as late as 1986.

The 4003 has been in continual production since its release.

=== Later models ===
==== Other 4000-series models ====
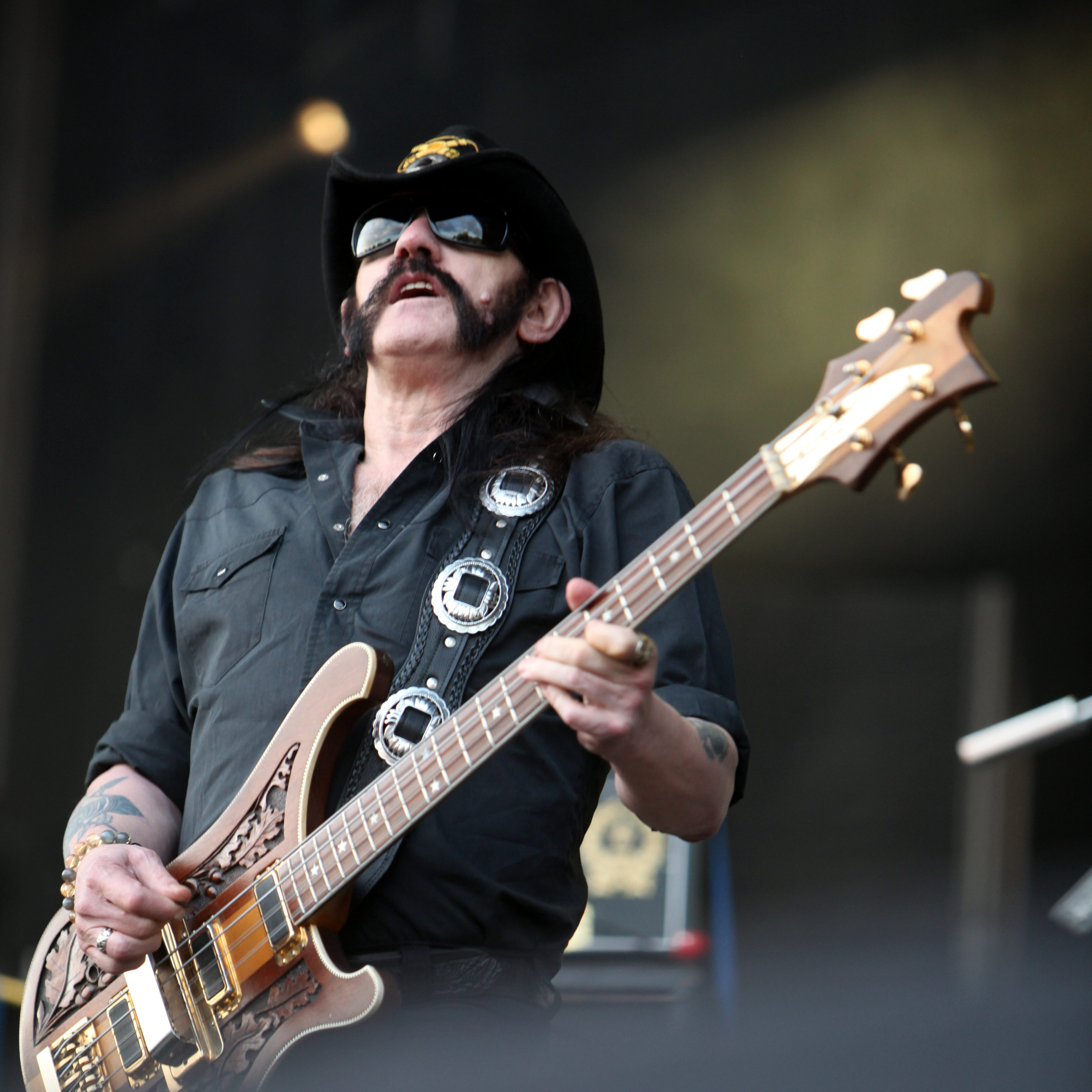
Lemmy of Motörhead with his 4004LK signature bass model

Since the 4000 and 4001, Rickenbacker has released multiple subsequent 4000-series models, beginning in 1967 with the limited edition model 4002. It featured a curly maple top, two humbucker pickups, and three jacks (mono, stereo, and low impedance) but it did not find success, as most bassists preferred the original single-coil pickups. Rickenbacker produced a double-neck guitar from 1975 until the early-1990s. Dubbed model 4080, it combined a 4001 with either a six- or twelve-string guitar. Model 4004, released in 1993 with "Cheyenne" and "Laredo" variants, used a similar body shape to its predecessors but featured high-output humbuckers and no pickguards. Rickenbacker updated the 4004 in 2000, releasing four- and five-string models. In 2005, the company released a limited-edition Lemmy Kilmister signature model (4004LK), which was characterized by its three pickups and carved oak leaf motiff on the body. Rickenbacker also produced an eight-string variant of the 4001, the 4008.

===== 4003 =====
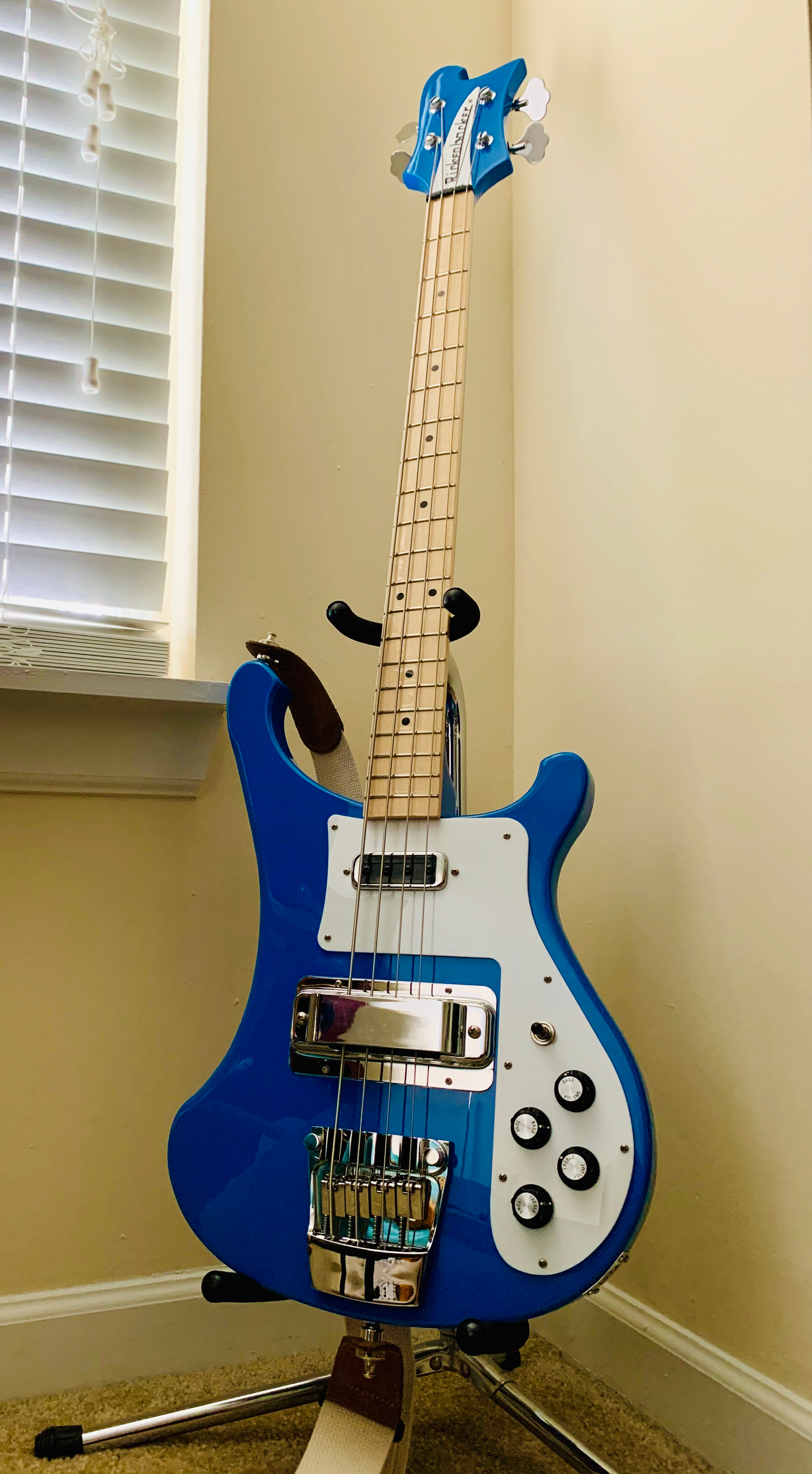
A 2020 CieloGlo 4003S, showing the lack of body/neck binding and dot fret inlays

In 1980, Rickenbacker debuted its model 4003, which was highly similar to the 4001 in appearance but was "specially engineered to accommodate roundwound strings," with the main difference being the inclusion of an updated truss rod system to handle the greater tension of roundwound strings. Using roundwounds allowed for a "singing sustain and treble punch" that Rickenbacker basses became known for.

In 1981, the brand released the 4003S, which—like the 4001S before it—omitted binding, but used triangle inlays until 1984 when dots became standard. It was originally produced until 1997. Variants included a five-string model (4003S5) and eight-string model (4003S8); there was also a fretless model (4003FL) and the 4003 Shadow, a 1986 Guitar Center exclusive in which 60 stores each received one copy. In 1987, Rickenbacker released the limited-edition "Tuxedo" 4003, which was entirely white except for a black pickguard and black hardware; this was followed the next year with the "Redneck" 4003, which was all red except for the black pickguard and hardware.

Rickenbacker re-released the 4003S in 2015 alongside the 4003SW, which had a walnut body for a warmer tone.

In 2019, Rickenbacker began quietly redesigning the 4003 to respond to consumer complaints. That year's model received a redesigned tailpiece, and 2022 saw the switch from a dual truss rod system to a more traditional single truss rod system with a slimmer D neck profile. In 2025, Rickenbacker removed the cosmetic bridge pickup cover in favor of a bezel with a thumb rest.

==== Reissues ====
Rickenbacker has released several reissue models of the 4001. The brand reissued the early-1960s 4001S as the 4001V6 in 1984. In 2001, released the 4001C64, a reproduction of a 1964 4001 with imitations of the original horseshoe-magnet and toaster-top pickups. The 4001C64S slightly reshaped the body and added a zero fret and satin finish to resemble the original 4001S used by Paul McCartney.

==== Signature models ====
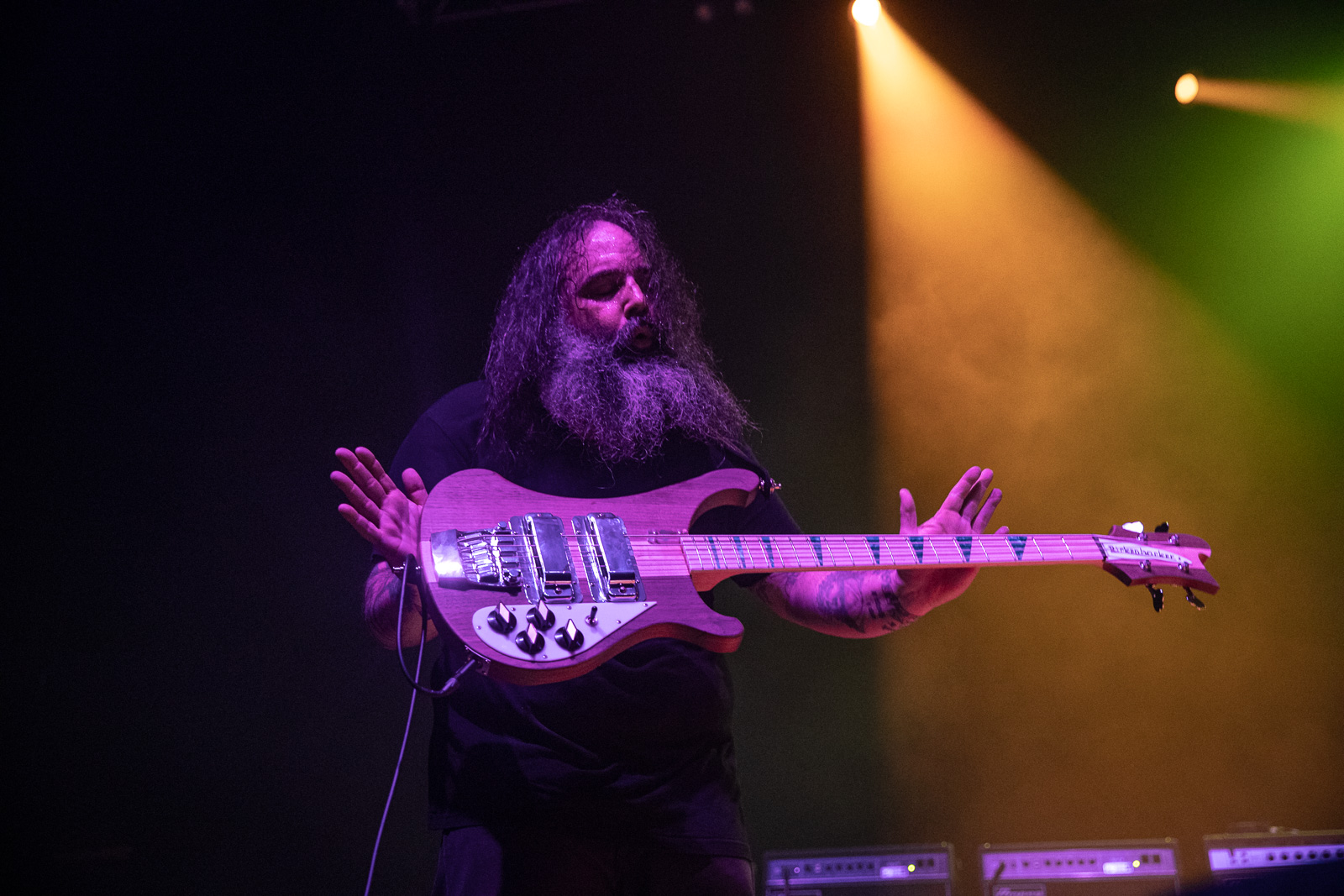
Al Cisneros with his signature model 4003AC

Several notable bass players have signature models based on the 4001 or 4003, such as Chris Squire of Yes (4001CS), Al Cisneros of Sleep and Om (4003AC), and Mike Mesaros of the Smithereens (4003S/SPC Blackstar).

== Notable players ==
- Lou Barlow of Dinosaur Jr.
- John Bentley of Squeeze
- Cliff Burton of Metallica
- Geezer Butler of Black Sabbath
- Jon Camp of Renaissance
- Peter Cetera of Chicago
- Al Cisneros of Sleep and OM
- John Deacon of Queen
- Julie Doiron of Eric's Trip
- John Entwistle of the Who
- Bruce Foxton of the Jam
- Roger Glover of Deep Purple and Rainbow
- Bob Hardy of Franz Ferdinand
- Glenn Hughes of Deep Purple, Trapeze, and Black Country Communion
- Rick James
- Inge Johansson of Against Me!
- Jesse F. Keeler of Death From Above 1979 and MSTRKRFT
- Lemmy Kilmister of Motörhead
- Audun Laading of Her's
- Geddy Lee of Rush
- Phil Lynott of Thin Lizzy
- Paul McCartney of the Beatles and Wings
- Randy Meisner of Eagles and Poco
- Mike Mills of R.E.M.
- Pete Quaife of the Kinks
- Scott Reeder of Kyuss
- Don Schiff
- Ben Shepherd of Soundgarden
- Paul Simonon of the Clash
- Jim Smith of Cardiacs
- Chris Squire of Yes
- Pete Trewavas of Marillion
- Andy Warren
- Chris Wolstenholme of Muse
