= Denzil (band) =

Denzil is an English rock/power pop band from Bournemouth, England, based around singer-songwriter Denzil Thomas. Denzil signed to Giant Records in the US in 1993 and put out one album, Pub, in 1994.

== History ==
Denzil was formed in Bournemouth in 1990 by singer/songwriter Denzil Thomas. Thomas had been playing at folk clubs for about a year when he met producer/bassist Steve Ennever at a Bournemouth studio. In 1990, they produced a cassette called A Tape Called Denzil. They formed a band and played their first show in September 1990.

Over the next year or so, Denzil played UK shows, first picking up alternating drummers Andy Place and Jeremy Stacey and later finding guitarist Craig Boyd in nearby Portsmouth.

In 1992, the band attracted the attention of former William Morris Agency and Famous Music A&R Michael LeShay. Based on the demo, Leshay convinced major label Giant Records to co-market and distribute a Denzil album in the US. The band entered the studio in the early summer of 1993 to begin recording the album. The album was produced, arranged, and mixed by Steve Ennever.

On 17 February 1994, an acoustic Thomas and Boyd played the pub at the St. Francis Hotel in San Francisco as part of the 1994 Gavin Convention. This was their first show in the US. Pub and the single, "Useless", was released on 12 April 1994.

However, despite these successes, Pub never sold in great numbers since frictions between LeShay and Giant ended up standing in the way of continued label support. By October 1994, the investors in Play Records, Cary Greene and Neil Stein, were arrested by the SEC for fraudulent behavior in the world of financial securities, which ultimately caused the Play Records funding to cease.

Frictions between Denzil and Steve Ennever also had an effect on the overall situation. Two days after returning from the US, Steve Ennever decided to part company with Denzil entirely.

Ennever was replaced live with Bournemouth stalwart bass player Martin "Budgie" Burden, also known as "Budge Magraw". In mid-January 1995, Thomas, Burden, Boyd and Stacey began an 11 date tour of the UK to support the release of Pub in the UK on BMG Records under license from Giant. Denzil entered the studio immediately afterwards with Stacey as producer to create a series of demos for the next album. The band also filmed a special for VH1 at this time, and was interviewed by Robert Sandall.

Sandall introduced Denzil to Billy Bragg's manager Peter Jenner who started looking after the band from early 1995. In May 1995, BMG declined to sign Denzil direct to the UK, which effectively left them without a deal. The band was offered a series of small record deals in 1995 and 1996, which were not taken up. By 1997, Thomas was working full-time in the music industry and effectively the band disbanded.

== Discography ==
Pub (Play Records/Giant Records), 1994
