= Chris Squire =

English bassist of rock band Yes (1948–2015)

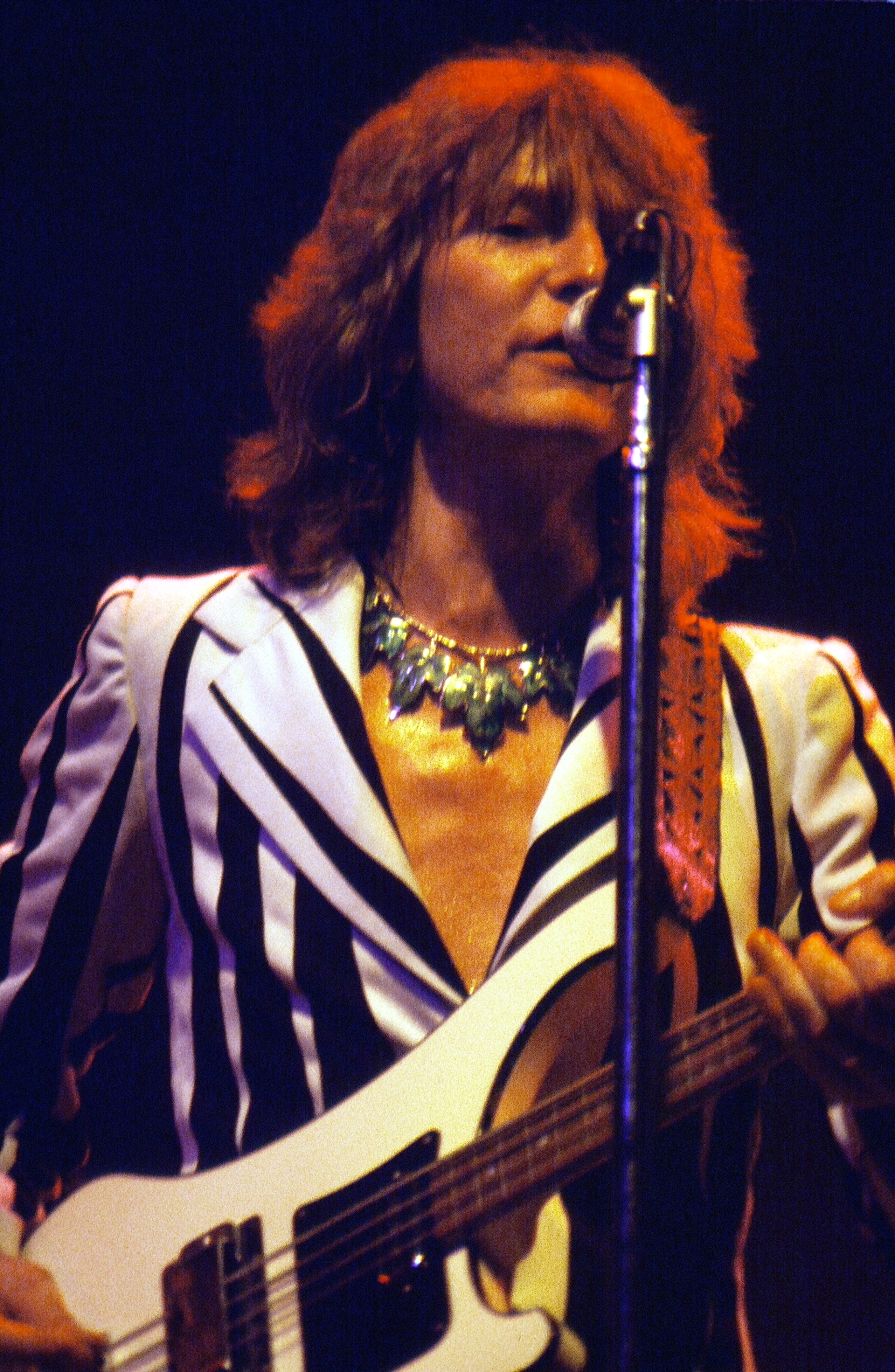
- Squire in August 1977

Background information
- Born: Christopher Russell Edward Squire; 4 March 1948; Kingsbury, London, England
- Died: 27 June 2015 (aged 67) Phoenix, Arizona, U.S.
- Genres: Progressive rock; symphonic rock; art rock
- Occupations: Musician; singer; songwriter
- Instruments: Bass guitar; vocals
- Years active: 1965–2015
- Labels: Atlantic; Wounded Bird; Sanctuary; Lime; Stone Ghost
- Formerly of: The Selfs; the Syn; Mabel Greer's Toyshop; Yes; XYZ; Conspiracy; Squackett

Christopher Russell Edward Squire (4 March 1948 – 27 June 2015) was an English musician, singer and songwriter best known as the bassist, backing vocalist, and only constant member of the progressive rock band Yes until his death in 2015. In 2017, he was posthumously inducted into the Rock and Roll Hall of Fame as a member of Yes.

Squire was widely regarded as the dominant bassist among the English progressive rock bands, influencing peers and later generations of bassists with his incisive sound and elaborately contoured, melodic bass lines. His name was associated with his trademark instrument, the Rickenbacker 4001 (British model RM1999). From 1991 to 2000, Rickenbacker produced a limited-edition signature model bass in his name, the 4001CS.

== Early life ==
Squire was born on 4 March 1948 in the north-west London suburb of Kingsbury, to Peter and Joanne Squire. He grew up there and in the nearby Queensbury and Wembley areas. His father was a cab driver and his mother a secretary for an estate agent. As a youngster Squire took a liking to records by Lena Horne and Ella Fitzgerald that belonged to his father, though his main interest was church music. At the age of six, he joined the church choir at St. Andrew's in Kingsbury as a treble along with Andrew Pryce Jackman, a friend who lived nearby. The choir got to perform at St. Paul's Cathedral. Their choirmaster Barry Rose was an early influence on Squire. "He made me realise that working at it was the way to become best at something". Squire also sang in the choir at his next school, Haberdashers' Aske's Boys' School, then located in Hampstead. He played the harmonica on his way home from school.

Squire did not consider a music career until the age of sixteen when the Beat music boom in the early 1960s and the emergence of the Beatles inspired him to "be in a group that don't use music stands". A schoolfriend recommended that Squire take up the bass after pointing out his tall frame and large hands, thinking they were ideal for playing the instrument. Squire then purchased his first bass, a Futurama, which he described as "very cheap, but good enough to learn on". In 1964, on the last day before the summer holidays, Squire's headmaster suspended him and a friend for having their hair too long and they were given two shillings and sixpence to have it cut. Instead, they went home and never returned. After his mother took him to a recruitment agency and enquired for work related to music, Squire landed work selling guitars at a Boosey & Hawkes shop in Regent Street. He used the staff discount offer to purchase a new bass, a Rickenbacker 4001, in 1965.

== Career ==
=== Early career ===
Squire's first band was the Syn, a rock and rhythm and blues band that featured Jackman on keyboards and Martin Adelman on drums. Their first public performance took place at The Graveyard, a youth club in the hall of St. Andrew's. In 1965, following several personnel changes, Squire, Jackman and Adelman teamed with singer Steve Nardelli, guitarist John Painter, and Icelandic drummer Gunnar Jökull Hákonarson to form a new group, the Syn. The group performed Tamla Motown covers before they changed direction towards psychedelic rock. After several months, Painter was replaced by guitarist Peter Banks. The new line-up gained a following large enough to secure a weekly residency at the Marquee Club in Soho, which was followed by a recording contract with Deram Records. The band once opened for The Jimi Hendrix Experience at the venue, "So I saw what was possible, and I just had this innate faith that I was going to make it." Together they released two singles before they disbanded.

Squire was fond of using LSD in the 1960s; a visit to the UFO Club on the drug on Friday which lasted through Saturday, and recovery on Sunday, became a regular event until a 1967 incident where he had a bad trip on a friend's home-made LSD. When the police asked him to reveal who gave it to him, Squire pretended to be disoriented and made up a story that involved an unknown Australian he met at a Wimpy restaurant beforehand. He recalled, "It was the last time I ever took it, having ended up in hospital in Fulham for a couple of days not knowing who I was, or what I was, or who anybody else was." After his discharge from hospital, Squire spent several months in his girlfriend's apartment, afraid to leave, only managing to visit the corner shop. He spent each day practising his bass playing which resulted in his distinct style, citing bassists John Entwistle, Jack Bruce, Paul McCartney, Larry Graham, James Jamerson, and Bill Wyman as early influences.

=== Yes ===
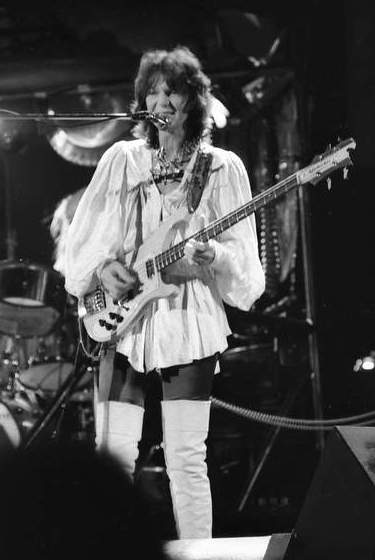
Squire performing with Yes in 1974

In September 1967, Squire joined Mabel Greer's Toyshop, a psychedelic group that included Peter Banks, singer Clive Bayley and drummer Bob Hagger. They played at the Marquee club where Jack Barrie, owner of the La Chasse drinking club a few doors down, saw them perform. "The musicianship ... was very good but it was obvious they weren't going anywhere", he recalled. One evening at La Chasse, Barrie introduced Squire to Jon Anderson, a worker at the bar who had not found success as the lead singer of The Gun or as a solo artist. The two found they shared common musical interests including Simon & Garfunkel, The Association and vocal harmonies. In the following days they developed "Sweetness", a track later recorded for the first Yes album.

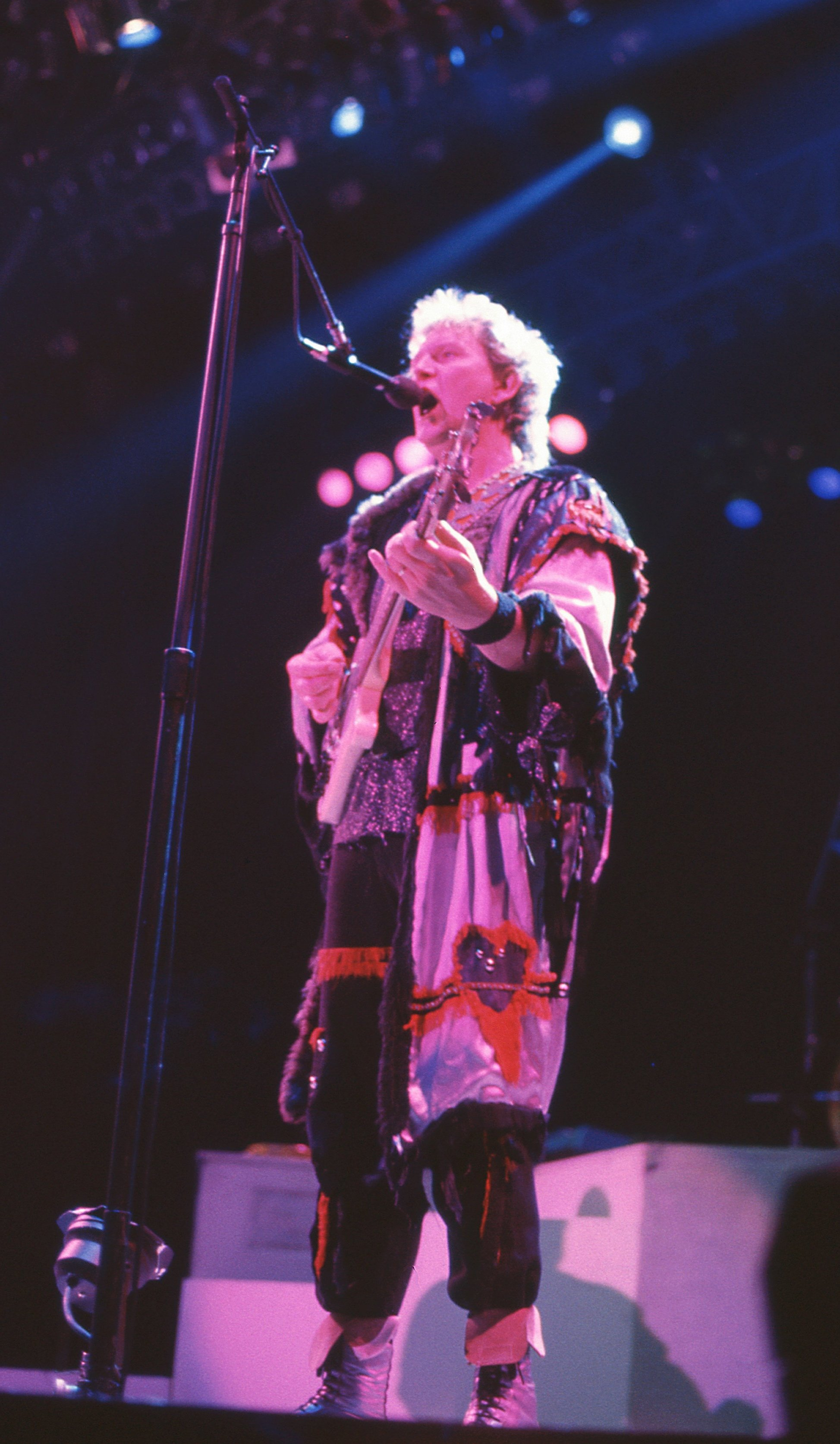
Squire performing with Yes at the NEC Arena, Birmingham, 1984

As the band developed, Anderson and Squire brought in drummer Bill Bruford, keyboardist Tony Kaye and Banks for rehearsals. The five agreed to drop the name Mabel Greer's Toyshop; they settled on the name Yes, originally Banks's idea. The band played their first show as Yes at a youth camp in East Mersea, Essex on 3 August 1968. Squire spoke about the band's formation: "I couldn't get session work because most musicians hated my style. They wanted me to play something a lot more basic. We started Yes as a vehicle to develop everyone's individual styles." Squire developed a bass solo named "A Bass Odyssey".

In August 1969, Yes released their self-titled debut album. Martyn Adelman, who had played drums with Squire's first group, did the album photos. Squire received writing credits on four of the album's eight tracks—"Beyond & Before", "Looking Around", "Harold Land", and "Sweetness".

After Bruford left the band and was replaced by Alan White in July 1972, Squire altered his playing to suit the change in the band's rhythm section. He felt he was "playing too much, though I was never really sure. With Bill, the things that I did felt right ... With Alan, I found that I was able to play a bit less than before and still get my playing across."

Squire described his playing on "The Remembering (High the Memory)" from Tales from Topographic Oceans (1973) as "one of the nicest things I think I've ever played".

Squire was the only member to play on each of the 21 studio albums released by Yes from 1969 to 2014. He was seen as one of the main forces behind the band's music, as well as being "perhaps the most enigmatic" group member. Heaven & Earth was his final studio album.

While most of the band's lyrics were written by Anderson, Squire co-wrote much of their music with guitarist Steve Howe (with Anderson occasionally contributing). In addition, Squire and Howe would supply backing vocals in harmony with Anderson on songs such as "South Side of the Sky" and "Close to the Edge".

During the band's formative years Squire was frequently known for his lateness, a habit that Bruford often complained about. Because of this, Squire would frequently drive at unsafe speeds to get to gigs on time, once causing an accident on the way to a gig in West Germany after he fell asleep at the wheel, although nobody was injured. A posthumous commemorative brown plaque was titled in such a way as to make reference to his habitual lateness, namely "'The Late' Chris Squire".

As Squire, along with Alan White and Steve Howe, co-owned the "Yes" name at the time, the 1989 ABWH line-up without him (which contained Anderson, Bruford, Wakeman and Howe) could not record under that name.

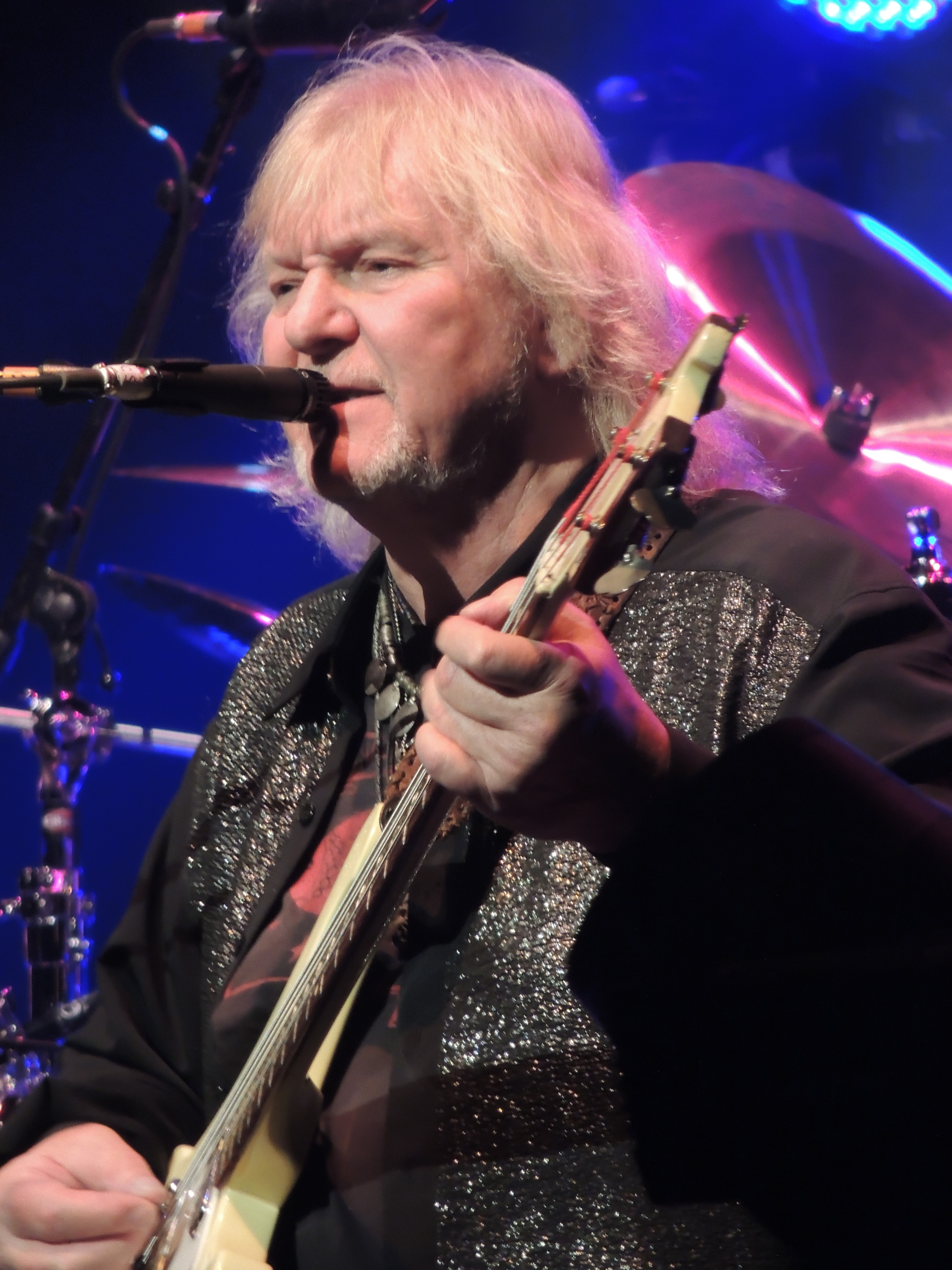
Squire performing with Yes in April 2013

Following Squire's death on 27 June 2015, the band's show on 7 August of the same year marked the first Yes concert ever performed without him. Former member Billy Sherwood replaced Squire during their 2015 North American tour with Toto from August to September 2015, as well as their performances in November 2015, as announced when the band first revealed Squire's disease in May 2015.

=== Other projects ===
Squire concentrated overwhelmingly on Yes' music over the years, producing little solo work. His first solo record was 1975's Fish Out of Water, featuring Yes alumni Bill Bruford on drums and Patrick Moraz on keyboards and The Syn/The Selfs alumnus Andrew Jackman also on keyboards.

In 1981, Squire was a member of the short lived XYZ, short for eX-Yes/Zeppelin (Squire claimed his father had come up with the name) together with White and guitarist Jimmy Page. XYZ recorded several demo tracks, but never produced anything formal, though two of the demos provided the basis for two later Yes tracks, "Mind Drive" and "Can You Imagine?" Led Zeppelin singer Robert Plant was not ready, despite Page's promises, to get involved with the band so soon after the death of Zeppelin drummer John Bonham. According to Squire, Zeppelin manager Peter Grant objected to the name as the "Y" appeared before the "Z" in the name. The group then "fizzled out".

Squire also played a role in bringing Trevor Rabin into the Cinema band project, which became the 90125 line-up of Yes.

In later years, Squire would join with Yes guitarist Billy Sherwood in a side project called Conspiracy. This band's self-titled debut album in 2000 contained the nuclei of several songs that had appeared on Yes' recent albums. Conspiracy's second album, The Unknown, was released in 2003.

In late 2004, Squire joined a reunion of The Syn. The reformed band released the album Syndestructible in 2005 before breaking up again.

Squire also worked on two solo projects with other former Syn collaborators Gerard Johnson, Jeremy Stacey and Paul Stacey. A Christmas album, Chris Squire's Swiss Choir, was released in 2007 (with Johnson, J. Stacey and Steve Hackett). Squire collaborated again with Hackett, formerly of the band Genesis, to make the Squackett album A Life Within a Day, released in 2012.

== Style and legacy ==
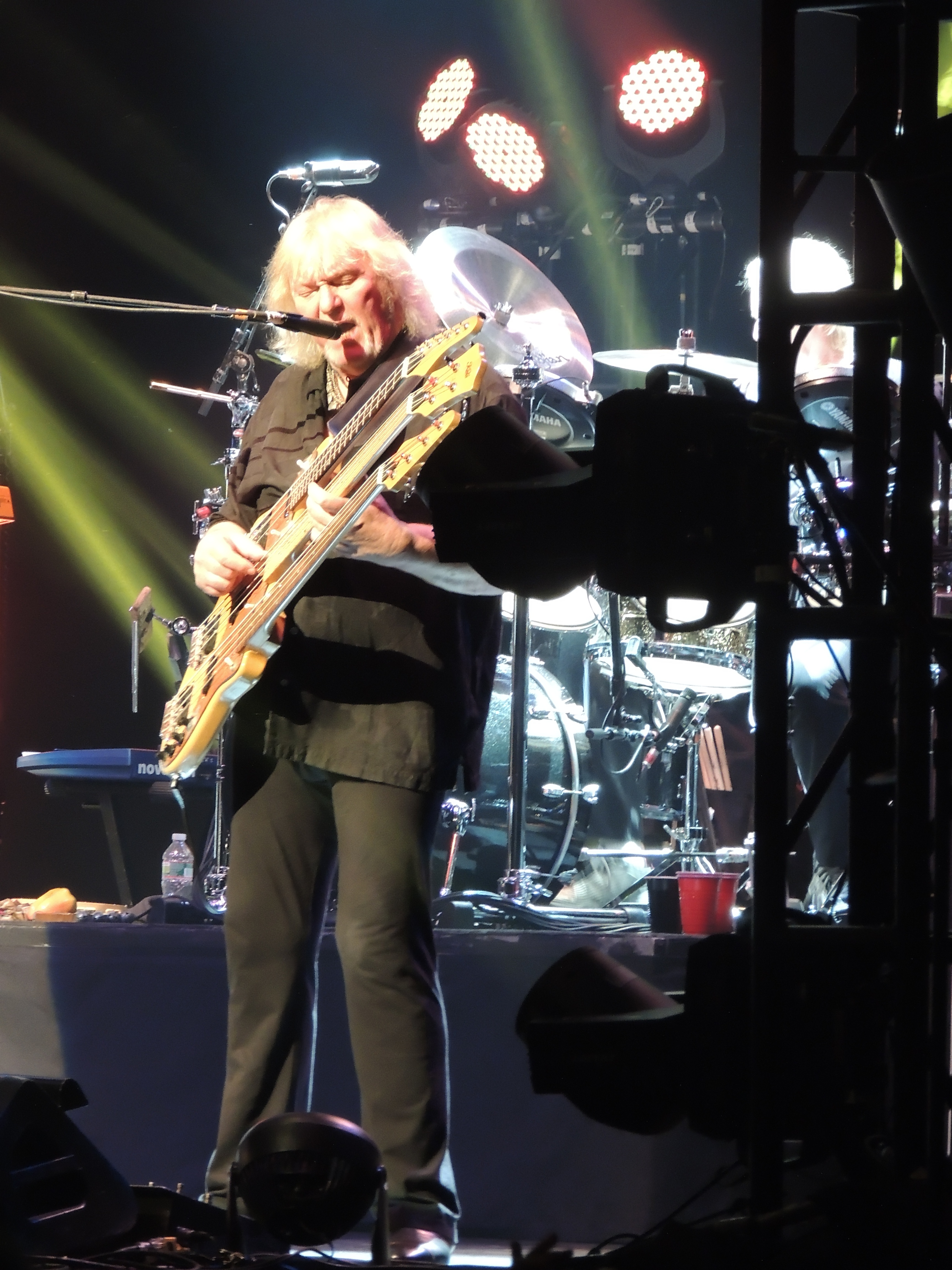
Squire with his triple-necked bass guitar in 2013, given to him by bandmate Rick Wakeman

Squire's unique tone was very clear and distinct, and his playing was noted for being aggressive, dynamic and melodic.

Squire played primarily with a pick (usually a grey Herco "heavy") held with the tip very close to his own fingertips, meaning that his thumb would also strike the strings right after the pick, causing subtle harmonics. He made frequent use of hammer-ons, pull-offs as well as alternate and tremolo picking. Aside from his use of distortion, Squire occasionally used other effects, most notably chorus, flanger and wah-wah pedals, which until then had mostly been used by guitarists.

In a 1973 interview for Guitar Player magazine, Squire recalled how he had obtained his distinctive tone at the time by rewiring his RM1999 into stereo and sending the bass and treble pick-ups each into a separate amplifier. By splitting the signal from his bass into dual high and low frequency outputs and then sending the low frequency output to a conventional bass amplifier and the high-frequency output to a separate lead guitar amplifier, Squire produced a tonal "sandwich" that added a growling, overdrive edge to the sound while retaining the Rickenbacker's powerful bass response. This gave his bass sound bright, growling higher frequencies and clean, solid bass frequencies.

This technique allowed Squire to use harmonic distortion on his bass while avoiding the flat, fuzzy sound, loss of power and poor bass response that typically occurs when bass guitars are overdriven through an amplifier or put through a fuzz box. Squire also made notable use of fret buzz, a normally undesirable condition caused by low string action, to create a further, growling edge to his playing.

He also played with a pick which contributed to the sharp attack as well as using fresh Rotosound Swing Bass strings for every show. Squire's intricate and complex bass playing style has influenced subsequent bassists such as Billy Sheehan, Nick Beggs, Geddy Lee of Rush, Mike Mills of R.E.M., Steve Di Giorgio of Death and Sadus, Pat Badger of Extreme, Jon Camp of Renaissance, Steve Harris of Iron Maiden, Les Claypool of Primus, John Myung of Dream Theater, Robert DeLeo of Stone Temple Pilots and John Cooper of Skillet. John Deacon of Queen was also inspired by Squire, and told Guitar Magazine that Squire was his favourite bass player.

=== Instruments and equipment ===
Squire's main instrument was a 1964 Rickenbacker bass that he bought and began playing in 1965. Although generally referred to as having been a 4001 model, it was actually from the RM1999 series, a British export version of the 4001. Squire's had the serial number DC127. Squire mentioned in a 1979 interview with Circus Weekly that he acquired this bass while working at the Boosey & Hawkes music store in London. Before acquiring its final distinctive cream-coloured lacquer, the bass had twice been customised with a paper finish (firstly with flowery wallpaper and subsequently with silver reflective paper) and on each occasion it had to be sanded down when the paper was removed, reducing its mass and altering its resonance. A faulty bridge pickup with lower output and "tinny sound", was another part of the instrument's sonic character, with Squire incorporating the existing fault by using it as backup and support to the other, fully-working pickup (adding to the overall harmonic output). The instrument, with its warmth, was a significant part of Squire's unique sound. Due to its distinctive tone, which has been compared to that of a guitar, it allowed the bass to take on a more "lead" role, which created a dynamic sound, and suited Squire perfectly.

Although Squire is usually associated with the Rickenbacker, he played many different models of bass guitar throughout his career, selecting each instrument according to the demands of the song and the approach of the time. In addition to four-string bass, he was an early pioneer of eight-string bass, occasionally played five-string, six-string, and fretless bass, and had an interest in integrating technology into his instruments.

In the early years of Yes, Squire played a Fender Telecaster Bass almost as frequently as he played his Rickenbacker RM1999. During the mid-1970s, he played a Fender Jazz Bass on specific tracks such as "The Gates of Delirium" and a Gibson Thunderbird on tracks including "Release, Release". In 1980, Squire obtained an MPC Electra 4-string with built-in effects units (heard to best effect on Drama's "Tempus Fugit". Yes' 1983 comeback single "Owner of a Lonely Heart" featured a custom green four-string designed by Jim Mouradian, while during the late 1980s Squire played a variety of Tobias four and five-string basses (using these almost exclusively on 1987's Big Generator album). Later in his life, Squire added to his armoury of four-string basses with models by Lakland and Yamaha.

Squire began playing eight-string bass in the early 1970s. His initial choice was a prototype Rickenbacker eight-string, but from the mid-1970s onwards this was superseded by a custom instrument made by Ranney; on "Fortune Seller" from Yes' 1998 album Open Your Eyes, he played then-guitarist Billy Sherwood's unique Spector 8-string bass. While his playing of fretless bass was infrequent, he would use a fretless Guild model on such occasions.

Apart from his Rickenbacker, Squire played a custom triple-neck bass made by Wal and originally constructed for Roger Newell of the Rick Wakeman band, and which Wakeman subsequently gifted to Squire. This instrument was used for live performances of the Yes song "Awaken", for stage impact and to avoid the necessity for rapid changes between instruments for different parts (as had been the case in the studio version). It was adapted for Squire's purposes, with the top neck being a six-string bass with doubled A, D, and G strings, the middle neck being a standard fretted four-string, and the bottom neck being a fretless four-string.

Squire was an enthusiastic user of bass pedals, initially playing Moog Taurus pedals but later replacing them with samples triggered from an E-Mu ESI2000 sampler via a pedal array.

Squire's choice of effects pedals included Maestro Fuzz-Tone, TC Electronic Stereo Chorus Flanger, TC Nova Reverb, Boss OC-3 Super Octave, Mu-Tron III, and custom-made tremolo pedals. Throughout his career, Squire used a Marshall JMP Super Bass 100-watt amp and 4x12 cabinet, but over time he also used Sunn amps and cabinets, Ampeg SVT-2 PROs, Ampeg 8x10 cabs, and a pair of Clair Brothers custom 6x12 cabinets with directional speakers.

In addition to bass guitar and bass pedals, Squire also occasionally played harmonica, piano, and six or twelve-string guitar.

== Personal life ==
Squire met his first wife Nikki in 1970 at a club in London. They married in 1972. She sang on the 1981 Christmas single "Run with the Fox" and also the track "Hold Out Your Hand" from Fish Out of Water (1975). In 1983, she formed Esquire, on whose first album Chris, Alan White, and Trevor Horn assisted. They had three daughters. The couple divorced after fifteen years of marriage.

Squire married actress Melissa Morgan on 8 May 1993. She gave birth to their son in 2000. She played Brittany Norman on The Young and the Restless and later returned to the daytime drama as Agnes Sorensen.

His third and final marriage was to Scotland Squire who gave birth to their daughter in 2008. In 2014, they were living in Phoenix, Arizona, having previously resided in Chelsea.

Squire was a vegetarian in the 1970s. In 1973, he toured with the Eagles and was introduced to cocaine. At some point in his life, Squire also suffered a heart attack.

Squire's nickname, "Fish", originated due to multiple reasons. His astrological sign was Pisces, and he was known for his love of bathing. The name seems to have mostly been initiated by bandmate Bill Bruford, who has commented on how Squire spent long periods in the bathroom while they shared a house together in Fulham and how, in the early days of Yes' career, he once accidentally flooded a hotel room in Oslo, Norway, while taking a shower. Another factor in the naming is the heteronymic and punning meanings of "bass", describing low frequency sound or the bass guitar as well as the fish. The nickname is incorporated into several of Squire's works including his solo record, Fish Out of Water (1975), and the solo piece "The Fish" (Schindleria Praematurus) from the 1971 Yes record Fragile.

In 2011, a species of fossil fish was named Tarkus squirei in Squire's honour, referencing his nickname.

== Illness, death, and tributes ==
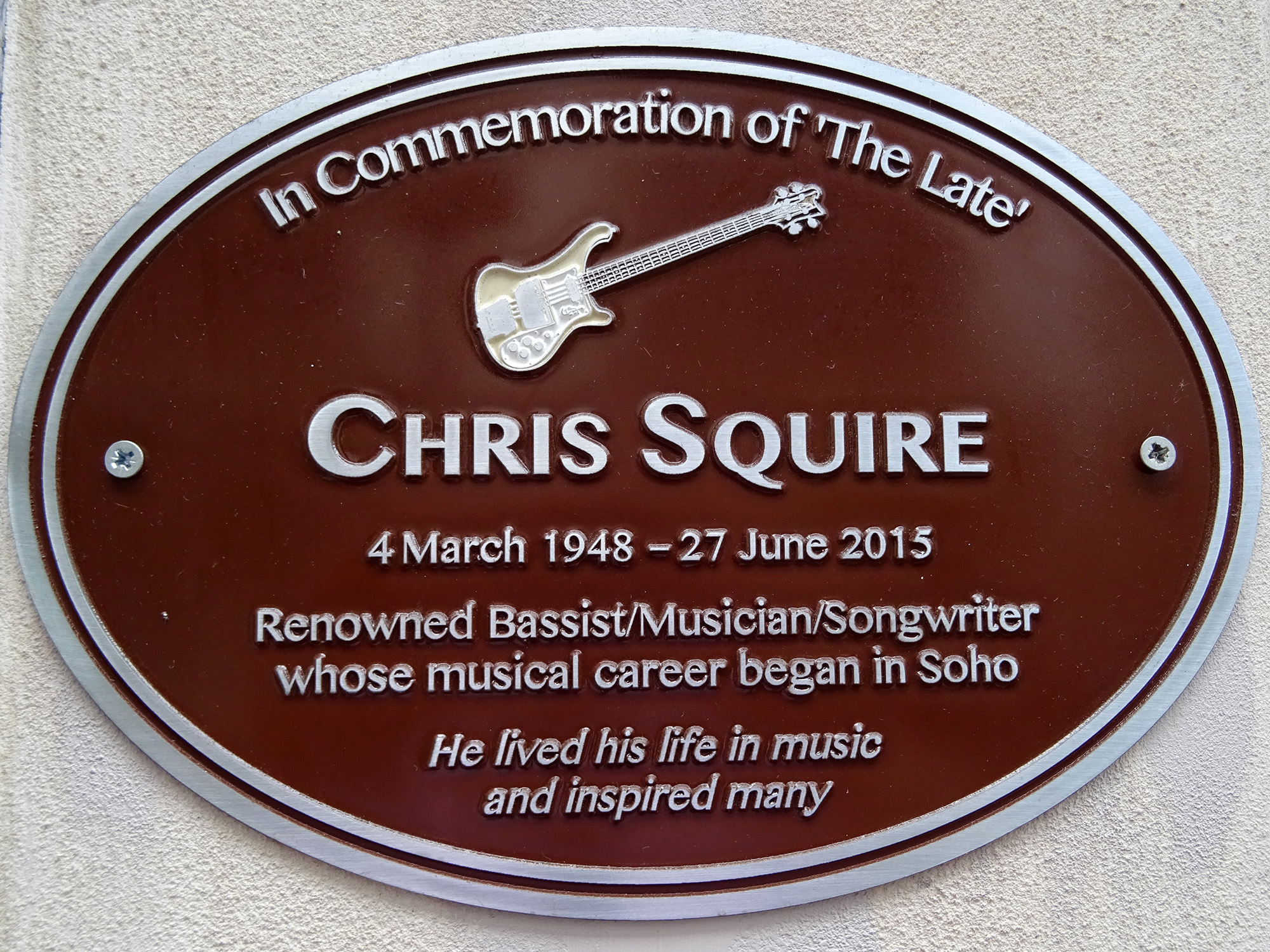
Brown plaque in Warwick Street, Soho, London

On 19 May 2015, Yes announced that Squire had been diagnosed with acute erythroid leukemia, and would take a break from performing while receiving treatment.

In the late evening of 27 June 2015, Squire died from the illness, aged 67, while receiving treatment in his adopted hometown of Phoenix, Arizona. Yes' official Facebook page confirmed the news the next day. Tributes were paid by fellow musicians Brian May, Geezer Butler, Gene Simmons and Tom Morello, as well as bandmates Geoff Downes and Bill Bruford.

In June 2015, The Inventioning Band (originally co-founded by Jon Anderson and Jean-Luc Ponty) filmed a music video tribute to Squire along the Oregon Coast. The video features a cover of Squire's song "Onward". On the third day of filming, the group received news of Squire's death. The completed video was released on the first anniversary of his death, and has since become The Inventioning Band's most viewed release.

In April 2016, asteroid 2002 XR80 received an official permanent name from the International Astronomical Union in honour of Squire. Asteroid (90125) Chrissquire was discovered 11 December 2002 and is a main-belt asteroid with an orbital period of 4.08 years.

In November 2018, the tribute album A Life in Yes: The Chris Squire Tribute was released by Purple Pyramid Records. It contained covers of Yes songs, performed by artists such as Jon Davison, Patrick Moraz, Steve Porcaro, Steve Hackett, Tony Kaye, Dweezil Zappa and Candice Night.

In 2020, Rolling Stone ranked him as the 18th greatest bass player of all time.

== Discography ==
=== Solo singles ===
- "Run with the Fox" – with Alan White 1981

=== Solo albums ===
- Fish Out of Water (1975)
- Chris Squire's Swiss Choir (2007)

=== With Conspiracy ===
- Conspiracy (2000 + DVD)
- The Unknown (2003)

=== With Squackett ===
- A Life Within a Day (2012)

=== With The Syn ===
see The Syn

=== With Yes ===
see Yes discography

=== As guest musician ===
- 1968: Neat Change – I Lied to Aunty May (with Peter Banks on guitar, Squire plays the tambourine and performs backing vocals on this single)
- 1970: "Legs" Larry Smith – Witchi-tai-to (with Tony Kaye on this single by a member of Bonzo Dog Doo Dah Band)
- 1973: Rick Wakeman – The Six Wives of Henry VIII (Steve Howe, Bill Bruford & Alan White)
- 1973: Eddie Harris – E.H. in the U.K. (with Tony Kaye & Alan White)
- 1977: Rick Wakeman – Rick Wakeman's Criminal Record (with Alan White)
- 1981: The Buggles – Adventures in Modern Recording (Squire is credited only with "sound effects" on one piece, while the bass is played by Trevor Horn)
- 1987: Esquire – Esquire (Chris's ex-wife Nikky Squire with Alan White, Trevor Horn & Carmen Squire, Chris's daughter)
- 1990: Rock Aid Armenia – a single re-recording of Deep Purple's "Smoke on the Water" (with Keith Emerson, Geoff Downes, Ian Gillan, Bruce Dickinson, Paul Rodgers, David Gilmour, Ritchie Blackmore, Tony Iommi, Alex Lifeson, Bryan Adams, Brian May & Roger Taylor), which is also included on The Earthquake Album.
- 1993: Rick Wakeman – Classical Connections 2 (recorded in 1971 but published in 1991 with Steve Howe & Bill Bruford)
- 1995: World Trade – Euphoria with Billy Sherwood, co-wrote two songs
- 2002: Gov't Mule – The Deep End, Volume 2 (plays bass on "Sun Dance")
- 2002: Various artists – Pigs and Pyramids - An All Star Lineup Performing the Songs of Pink Floyd (again published as Back Against the Wall from Billy Sherwood in 2005)
- 2009: Steve Hackett – Out of the Tunnel's Mouth
- 2011: Steve Hackett – Beyond the Shrouded Horizon
- 2012: Billy Sherwood & The Prog Collective – The Technical Divide (with Alan Parsons & Gary Green)
- 2012: Various artists – Songs of the Century: An All-Star Tribute to Supertramp. Let the World Revolve (with Billy Sherwood & Tony Kaye)
- 2013: Billy Sherwood & The Prog Collective – Epilogue (Shining Diamonds with Patrick Moraz, Billy Sherwood, Alan Parsons & Steve Stevens)
- 2015: Steve Hackett – Wolflight (Squire plays bass on "Love Song to a Vampire")
