= A Life Within a Day =

Studio album by Squackett
- Released: 28 May 2012
- Genre: Progressive rock
- Length: 46:13
- Label: Esoteric Antenna; MVD Audio (US/Canada)
- Producer: Roger King

Professional ratings
Review scores
| Source | Rating |
|---|---|
| Allmusic | 4/5 stars |
| Classic Rock | 5/10 stars |
| progplanet.com | 3/5 stars |

A Life Within a Day is the only studio album by the musical project Squackett, featuring English musicians Chris Squire (Yes) and Steve Hackett (ex-Genesis). It was released on 28 May 2012, although it had been written and recorded a few years earlier. The title track, "A Life Within a Day" won the 'Anthem' award at the 2012 Progressive Music Awards. The song "Aliens" was first written as a Yes song titled "Aliens (Are Only Us from the Future)" which was performed during the first leg of Steve Howe, Chris Squire and Alan White of Yes' In the Present world tour, but had not been released on an album until the 2026 edition of Yes' From a Page.

Three decades earlier, Hackett had worked with Squire's Yes bandmate Steve Howe in the band GTR.

The project name Squackett is a portmanteau of "Squire" and "Hackett". The artwork on the album cover that resembles a Chinese character is the word Squackett written using Square Word Calligraphy, written by artist Xu Bing.

An edition that includes a DVD containing a 5.1 surround sound version of the album was released on 5 June 2012.

Hackett performed "Stormchaser" during the first part of his 2009 tour with his band, which stands as the only performance of Squackett material to date.

== Track listing ==
All songs by Steve Hackett, Chris Squire and Roger King, except where noted.

| No. | Title | Writer(s) | Length |
|---|---|---|---|
| 1. | "A Life Within a Day" | | 6:35 |
| 2. | "Tall Ships" | | 6:18 |
| 3. | "Divided Self" | Hackett, Squire, King, Nick Clabburn | 4:06 |
| 4. | "Aliens" | Hackett, Squire, King, Fran Healy | 5:32 |
| 5. | "Sea of Smiles" | | 5:25 |
| 6. | "The Summer Backwards" | | 3:00 |
| 7. | "Stormchaser" | | 5:26 |
| 8. | "Can't Stop the Rain" | Hackett, Squire, King, Gerard Johnson, Simon Sessler | 5:47 |
| 9. | "Perfect Love Song" | Hackett, Squire, King, Johnson | 4:04 |

== Personnel ==
Musicians

- Chris Squire – bass, vocals
- Steve Hackett – guitars, harmonica, vocals
- Roger King – keyboards
- Jeremy Stacey – drums
- Amanda Lehmann – backing vocals

String players on "Life Within a Day"

- Christine Townsend – viola, violin
- Richard Stewart – cello
- Dick Driver – double bass

Production

- Roger King – producer, programming
- Xu Bing – cover image
- Jon Brewer – licensing
- Mark Powell – project coordinator
- Vicky Powell – coordination
- Phil Smee – artwork, design
- Angéla Vicedomini – photography
- Maurizio Vicedomini – photography
