= Esquire (band) =

English rock band

- Origin: London, England
- Genres: Progressive rock, symphonic rock, art rock, psychedelic rock
- Years active: 1982–present
- Label: Renaissance Records
- Members: Nikki Squire; Nigel McLaren; Charles Olins; Danny Isaacs; Tony Matteucci

Esquire are an English rock band, formed in 1982, noted for their progressive, art, and symphonic style of rock music.

== Overview ==
Formed in 1982, Esquire released three studio albums: their self-titled debut album Esquire in 1987, a follow-up album Coming Home in 1997, and almost twenty-years later, No Spare Planet, their last album to date.

Two tracks from Coming Home, "Zone of O" and "Tron Thomi", were included on the compilation album Yes, Friends and Relatives. In 2000, two more tracks from Coming Home, "Coming Home" and "Big Girls Don't Cry", were included on the follow-up compilation album Yes, Friends and Relatives, Volume Two.

The band is headed by Nikki Squire, who, when the band started, was married to Yes bassist Chris Squire. Squire, Yes drummer Alan White, Yes producer (and former singer 1979–80) Trevor Horn and Chris and Nikki's eldest daughter, Carmen Squire, all worked on the band's debut album.

The second album, Coming Home, was largely written by Nikki Squire and Nigel McLaren; it also included Danny Isaacs on guitar and vocals on three tracks ("Coming Home", "Keep On Dreaming", "Glass Houses") and Tony Matteucci on drums and vocals.

== Discography ==
=== Studio albums ===
- 1987: Esquire
- 1997: Coming Home
- 2016: No Spare Planet

=== Compilation albums ===
- 2026: Echoes (10 track remixes compilation)

==== Appearances ====
- 1998: Yes, Friends and Relatives
- 2000: Yes, Friends and Relatives Volume 2
