= Heaven & Earth (Yes album) =

Studio album by Yes
- Released: 16 July 2014
- Recorded: 6 January–14 March 2014
- Studios: Neptune Studios, Los Angeles
- Genres: Progressive rock; soft rock; arena rock
- Length: 51:29
- Label: Frontiers
- Producer: Roy Thomas Baker

Yes chronology
The Studio Albums 1969–1987 (2013)	Heaven & Earth (2014)	Like It Is: Yes at the Bristol Hippodrome (2014)

Heaven & Earth is the twenty-first studio album by the English progressive rock band Yes. It was released on 16 July 2014 on Frontiers Records and is the first album with lead vocalist Jon Davison and the final album to feature founding bassist Chris Squire before his death in 2015. The group started preparing new material for an album during the 2013 leg of their Album Series Tour. Davison took an active approach with the songwriting, travelling to the homes of the other band members to collaborate on songs. Yes enlisted producer Roy Thomas Baker (who had previously worked with the band during recording sessions in 1979) and future Yes bassist Billy Sherwood to complete the mixing. This is the last production credit that Baker received before his death in 2025.

Heaven & Earth received mixed reviews. It reached No. 20 on the UK Albums Chart and became their highest charting album on the chart since their 1994 album Talk. It reached No. 26 on the US Billboard 200.

== Background and writing ==
In February 2012, the Yes line-up of bassist Chris Squire, guitarist Steve Howe, drummer Alan White, keyboardist Geoff Downes, and lead vocalist Benoît David suffered a setback when David left the group after contracting a respiratory illness, causing them to cancel the last shows of their 2011–2012 world tour. David was replaced by American singer Jon Davison, who was recommended to Squire by their mutual friend, Foo Fighters drummer Taylor Hawkins. With Davison on board, Yes resumed touring in April 2012. While touring in 2013, the band started to gather material for their first studio album since Fly from Here (2011). The prospect was met with some resistance from Howe, who held the group back from recording several times as the group had few musical ideas to develop. He feared that making an album too soon would have resulted in "a botched job."

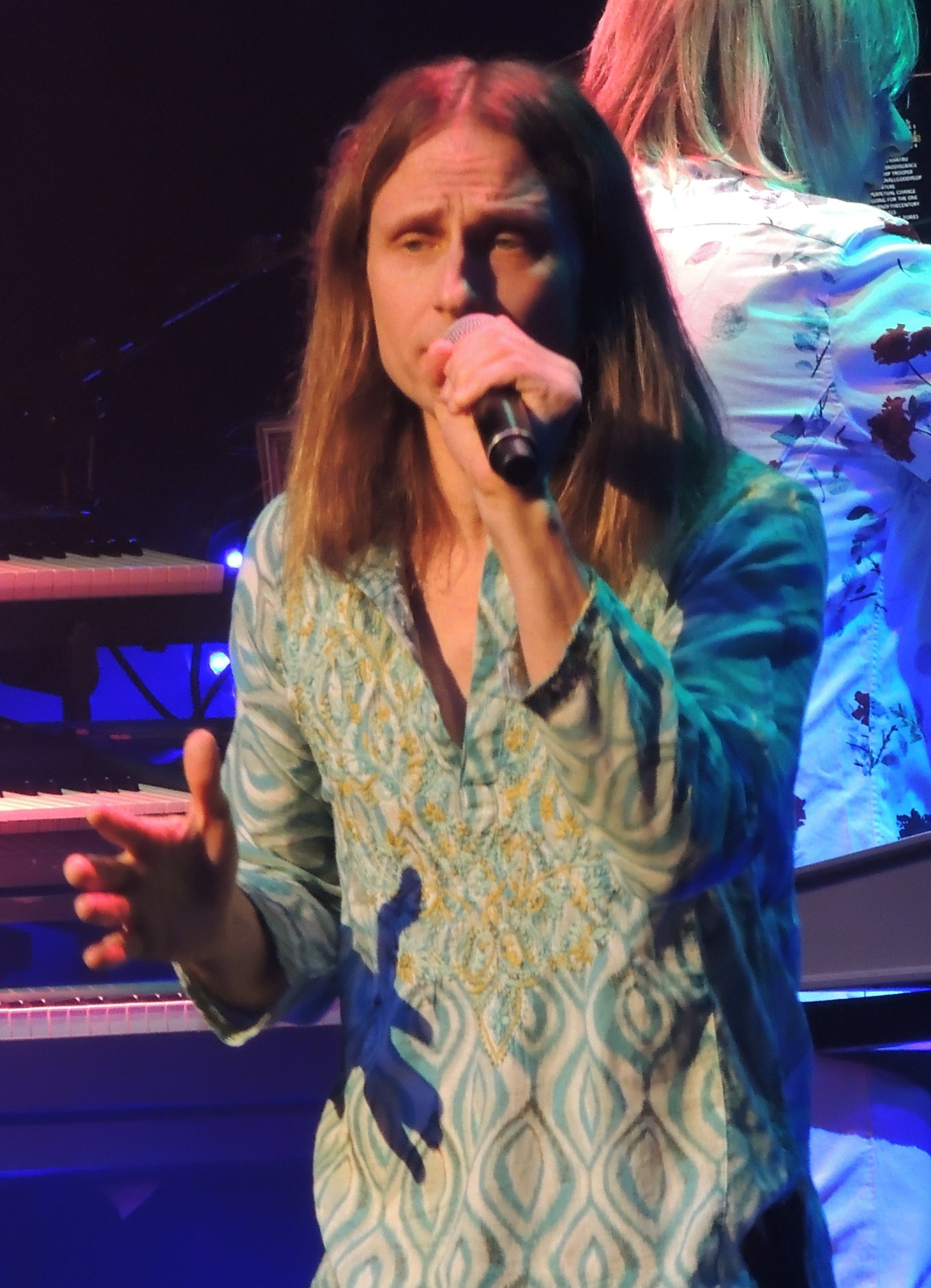
Heaven & Earth is Yes's first album with lead vocalist Jon Davison

By November 2013, the group had started to pool ideas for songs; Howe noted that Davison and himself had amassed a considerable amount of music which were developed further by the group. Davison was aware that Yes was planning to make an album at some point, which prompted him to start putting ideas down. He made the effort to travel to each of his band members' homes to work on music with them. As a result, he is credited on seven of the eight tracks on Heaven & Earth. He began with Squire at his home in Phoenix, Arizona, setting up a portable recording rig using Pro Tools that they used to write. He then travelled to Seattle, Washington to work with White. In December 2013, Davison went to England to write with Howe at his Devon farmhouse, then onto Wales to see Downes. Squire praised Davison's approach and thought he brought in an "interesting quality" to the songs. Howe maintained this view, describing Davison's writing as "excellent" considering that it was not a strength of David's. Davison thought that writing for the group was going to be a lot of pressure, but found this was not the case. He in fact credited his time with each member with improving his relationship with them and learning to work with their different songwriting methods and pace of working. Though the album did not have any concept, Davison noted that there are some common threads in his lyrics. As a collective he said that they encourage "to transcend the complacency we tend to fall into in our lives [...] to perfect our relationships, and go for the real meaning of what life is all about."

Prior to recording, Yes had a short rehearsal period in Los Angeles in January 2014, a time that Davison said was when the music "really came to life." Howe looked back on it as unnecessary, stressing that time was needed in the studio to go through each song. Howe commented on the material on Heaven & Earth, stating it has "a freshness and different stance" from previous Yes albums. He pointed out the absence of an "epic" or concept track and explained that the group did not want such a track to dominate the album, which they had gone for on Fly from Here. He added: "It's more about having different flavors and spices in our music that kind of show off each other." He later said that some of the material sounded "dangerously close to being accessible", but said "Subway Walls" has "profoundly good arrangement." Squire described Heaven & Earth as "an accessible but still adventurous album" that has "the Yes stamp of arrangement."

== Recording ==
Recording took place from 6 January to 14 March 2014 at Neptune Studios in Los Angeles. To produce the album Yes discussed the possibility of enlisting former Yes lead vocalist and producer Trevor Horn, but the idea was scrapped as discussions went on. Instead they hired Roy Thomas Baker, who had previously worked with the band on recording sessions in Paris in late 1979. Howe said they chose Baker mainly for "practical and sensibility" reasons and for his enthusiasm in working with Yes. Squire described his time with Baker as a "very enjoyable experience" and Baker someone "really good to work with". Davison praised Baker's tendency to encourage him to sing a part more enthusiastically or aggressive to help carry a section of a song. Downes was impressed with Baker's "old British style" of production with his preference towards vintage equipment.

In his 2021 memoir All My Yesterdays, Howe wrote critically of the Heaven & Earth sessions and Baker in particular. "Many mistakes were made, classic blunders of judgement were had and there was an utter lack of insight", he recalled. Howe had begun to have doubts about the producer when he seemed oblivious to changes the band was making in one song while he made repeated trips to the bathroom. As they progressed, Baker was indecisive by the standards of the producers the band had previously worked with, and twice walked out of the studio in a rage over what seemed to Howe to be relatively minor issues. Baker often seemed unenthusiastic about the band's material, usually saying "that's good enough" when a member recorded a take he liked; Howe recalls Baker being particularly demanding of Davidson for no apparent reason, making him do far more takes of his vocals than other producers had.

The band was using Pro Tools to record with, due to the possibilities it offered, but Baker still ran many overdubs through an extensive chain of onboard effects of his own. At one point, according to Howe, he was insisting on using Melodyne to autotune backing vocals that were, as far as the band could tell, in harmony and on-key to begin with. By late February 2014 it was obvious that the band would not be able to finish the album before its expected deadline unless they did so at a fast pace and went right from the studio to some previously scheduled tour dates in Canada.

On 5 March 2014, former Yes member Billy Sherwood announced that he would engineer the backing vocal sessions, which started the day after. He also confirmed that Squire and Howe would sing backing vocals on the album. On 7 March, Downes tweeted that he had completed recording his keyboard parts. During the recording and production stage, Howe tried to slow down the pace in hope of spending more time to refine the arrangements of the songs. He noted that the most successful Yes albums were partly down to the group collaborating with each other at this time.

The album entered the mixing stage in March 2014, which was followed by additional mixing session in May. Davison said that recording had to finish before the start of their 2014 North American tour which kicked off from 19 March. "We were just kind of throwing everything in at the last minute [...] We just ran out of time." While the group were on the road, Baker sent copies of the mixes that had been produced to the band for feedback and final approval. The group were unable to finish additional songs that they had recorded that did not make it onto the album. One track was described by Davison as "a big prog piece" by Downes and himself. Davison said that their exclusion from the final order was not due to a lack of quality, but merely the lack of time to finish it.

Howe was particularly dissatisfied with Baker's mixes, save "Subway Walls", and suggests he was not alone in that assessment. He laid blame for that on mixing the album over Skype due to the band being on tour, as the Internet does not always render sound faithfully over long distances. "Some parts were literally lost within the files and the overall result lacked any real cohesion."

== Artwork ==
The artwork was completed by longtime Yes cover artist Roger Dean. Regarding the album's title, Howe said that Dean and himself shared an interest in extremes and opposites and used the title of Heaven & Earth to show that "Earth is a physical place where you can measure stuff [...] But Heaven is an unknown place of no particular destination as far as anybody knows. And yet it doesn't matter whether you're totally tied up in a religious belief or whether you're spiritual in a way. That doesn't require religious commitment — it just requires awareness to the fact that there's obviously something out there that we don't know about." Dean has recounted how he accidentally came up with the title, thinking it had come from the band, but having made a mistake. The band, however, decided to stick with it.

Howe said he had suggested to Dean the idea of using a black-and-white-striped pattern in the logo, and was pleased with the way the artist used it. After his unhappiness with the recording sessions, Howe considers the cover the album's "saving grace ... the most fantastic painting."

== Release ==
Heaven & Earth was released in various territories between 16–22 July 2014. It peaked at number 20 on the UK album chart, the band's highest position since Talk (1994), which peaked at the same spot. It entered the US Billboard 200 chart at number 26, falling to 108 in its second week. The album was leaked online for free shortly after its release. Howe said the copyright infringement hurt him personally which affected his view towards making another Yes album for several years.

== Live performance ==
During the Heaven & Earth tour, Yes performed songs from Heaven & Earth (mostly "Believe Again" and "The Game", sometimes "To Ascend") with Fragile and Close to the Edge in their entirety, followed by an encore of their greatest hits.

== Reception ==
Professional ratings
Aggregate scores
Source	Rating
Metacritic	53/100
Review scores
Source	Rating
AllMusic	2/5 stars
Classic Rock	2.5/5 stars
Financial Times	2/5 stars
The Guardian	3/5 stars
Mojo	3/5 stars
Prog	(mixed)
Record Collector	3/5 stars
Sputnikmusic	0.5/5
Uncut	5/10

The album received a mixed reaction from critics. In a mixed review, The Quietus highly praised Davison, describing him as "absolutely the right choice for the band [...] Davison sings his bits, often with Squire backing him up, and those are often the best (or prettiest) parts of the album — Davison sounds like he's about to burst into tears on half these songs", but criticized the lack of energy, especially from White and Squire, and the tempo of the songs considered too slow. Summarized the Financial Times, "here come prog rock relics Yes to show the youth what proper boredom is, the kind of boredom that comes with bland guitar solos, chugging drums, lumbering time changes and otiose lyrics about "getting to know the empty space/Beneath the surface of common days."

The Guardian stated "the album [has] a rich, 70s sound, and the material is solid enough, flavoured with Steve Howe's distinctive, rippling guitar and Geoff Downes' retro keyboard. What's missing is the ambitious scope of their heyday, and the vitality of the younger generation of progressive rock bands."

Howe looked back on Heaven & Earth in 2016 and said it was a "hellishly tricky album to make." Davison described the album as a "huge disappointment" in a 2023 interview, saying that the songs were not developed.

I really felt like Heaven & Earth was a huge disappointment, and I know I'm not the only one. And I'm just speaking candidly. I had such high hopes, that was my chance to, sort of, come full circle and prove myself as a well rounded artist. Not just one on stage, but one that could thrive in the studio. But the album never developed properly, the songs never got the full treatment and were never polished. So what we basically released was a series of demos. And that was a huge disappointment for me.

— Jon Davison

He said Baker was going through "a lot of personal things" at the time, which slowed recording of the album, and the band "ran out of time".

== Track listing ==
No.	Title	Writer(s)	Length
1.	"Believe Again"	Jon Davison, Steve Howe	8:01
2.	"The Game"	Chris Squire, Davison, Gerard Johnson	6:49
3.	"Step Beyond"	Howe, Davison	5:34
4.	"To Ascend"	Davison, Alan White	4:40
5.	"In a World of Our Own"	Davison, Squire	5:19
6.	"Light of the Ages"	Davison	7:37
7.	"It Was All We Knew"	Howe	4:11
8.	"Subway Walls"	Davison, Geoff Downes	9:02
Total length:			51:28

Japanese bonus track
No.	Title	Writer(s)	Length
9.	"To Ascend" (Acoustic Version)	Davison, White	4:35

== Personnel ==
Yes

- Steve Howe – electric, acoustic and steel guitars, backing vocals, Portuguese guitar on "To Ascend"
- Chris Squire – bass, backing vocals
- Alan White – drums, percussion
- Geoff Downes – keyboards, computer programming
- Jon Davison – lead and backing vocals, acoustic guitar on "Believe Again" and "Light of the Ages"

Additional musician

- Gerard Johnson – additional keyboards on "The Game"

Production

- Roy Thomas Baker – production
- Dave Dysart – engineering
- Eric Corson – engineering
- Daniel Meron – assistant engineer
- Billy Sherwood – mixing, engineering on backing vocals
- Maor Appelbaum – mastering
- Kate Haynes – sleeve design
- Roger Dean – cover art, Yes logo

== Charts ==
Chart (2014)	Peak position
Austrian Albums (Ö3 Austria)	56
Belgian Albums (Ultratop Flanders)	117
Belgian Albums (Ultratop Wallonia)	50
Dutch Albums (Album Top 100)	41
Finnish Albums (Suomen virallinen lista)	45
German Albums (Offizielle Top 100)	23
Japanese Albums (Oricon)	37
Scottish Albums (Official Charts)	18
Swiss Albums (Schweizer Hitparade)	29
UK Albums (Official Charts)	20
UK Independent Albums (Official Charts)	4
US Billboard 200	26
US Top Rock Albums (Billboard)	7
