= XYZ (English band) =

Rock supergroup (1981)

- Origin: London, England
- Genres: Progressive rock, hard rock
- Years active: 1981
- Label: Swan Song
- Spinoff of: Led Zeppelin, Yes
- Past members: Chris Squire; Alan White; Jimmy Page; Dave Lawson

XYZ were a short-lived English rock supergroup. The name XYZ is taken from "eX-Yes-Zeppelin" as the group consisted of ex-Led Zeppelin guitarist Jimmy Page, along with ex-Yes members Chris Squire (bass guitar, vocals, keyboards) and Alan White (drums).

== History ==
The band came together after Squire met Page by chance at a party shortly before Christmas 1980. The group also featured former Greenslade keyboard player and vocalist Dave Lawson. Squire was the main writer for the group. Page believed the band needed a strong vocalist and sought out former Led Zeppelin frontman Robert Plant. Plant attended a rehearsal on 28 February 1981, but decided not to join the group, citing his dislike for the complexity of the music and his grief over the recent death of Led Zeppelin's drummer John Bonham.

With neither a firm commitment from Plant nor clarity about who would manage the group (Peter Grant or Brian Lane), the band's future was in limbo. Squire and White recorded a Christmas single, "Run with the Fox", in October 1981 before forming Cinema with guitarist Trevor Rabin and keyboardist Tony Kaye. Rabin initially attempted to rework the XYZ material along with his solo songs for the new group. Cinema went on to become a reformation of Yes with the addition of singer Jon Anderson, and the album 90125 was recorded in 1983. It is unclear what of the XYZ material made it to 90125, but White said in a 2008 interview that "those were the beginning of some songs that ended up on the next Yes album anyway." White also confirmed the XYZ material was used on 90125 album in a 2012 interview.

In 1984, Page joined Yes, including Squire and White, on stage, playing "I'm Down" during a concert in their 9012Live tour at Westfalenhalle in Dortmund, Germany.

Page has not dismissed the possibility of releasing the XYZ material. Squire supported the idea, but said Page had not discussed the matter with him. Squire died in 2015 and very little has been heard about releasing material, except some speculation in 2020. White died in 2022, leaving only Page and Lawson as surviving members.

== Demoed material ==
A four-song demo tape of XYZ consisting of two instrumentals and two songs, "Can You See" and "Telephone Secrets" (featuring vocals from Squire), exists and can be found on ROIO trading sites.

- Instrumental: part of one instrumental was reworked and became part of "Mind Drive" on the 1997 Yes album Keys to Ascension 2 (credited as a band composition).
- Instrumental: part of the other instrumental was used as the intro to The Firm's "Fortune Hunter". About "Fortune Hunter", Squire explained, "One of the tracks ended up being called "Fortune Hunter" [...] that was a riff that Jimmy brought into the mix anyway. Part of our song "Mind Drive" was also from those sessions as well. [...] Most of the songs were mine. I'm the only vocalist on it."
- "Can You See" would resurface as "Can You Imagine" on Yes' 2001 album Magnification.
- "Telephone Secrets" had been rehearsed by Yes in 1980, when they were a trio before working on the Drama album. The 2004 CD reissue of Drama features among its bonus tracks an instrumental take entitled "Song No. 4 (Satellite)".

== Personnel ==
- Chris Squire – bass guitar, vocals
- Jimmy Page – guitar
- Dave Lawson – keyboards
- Alan White – drums
