= The Lemon Trees =

British musical group

The Lemon Trees were a 1990s British pop band consisting of Guy Chambers, twin brothers Paul Stacey and Jeremy Stacey, Alex Lewis and Paul Holman. The band formed in 1993 and recorded two albums, but the second was not released. They disbanded in 1995.

Chambers went on to work as a songwriter, musician and record producer, most notably for his work with Robbie Williams.

== Discography ==
=== Album ===
- Open Book (Oxygen Records/MCA - 1993)

=== Singles ===
- "Love Is in Your Eyes" (Oxygen/MCA - 1992) UK No. 75 - lead vocal by Guy Chambers
- "The Way I Feel" (Oxygen/MCA - 1992) No. 62 - lead vocal by Paul Holman
- "Let It Loose" (Oxygen/MCA - 1993) No. 55 - lead vocal by Guy Chambers
- "Child of Love" (Oxygen/MCA - 1993) No. 55 - lead vocal by Alex Lewis
- "I Can't Face the World" (Oxygen/MCA - 1993) No. 52 - lead vocal by Paul Holman
