= Run with the Fox =

"Run With the Fox"

Single by Chris Squire and Alan White
- B-side: "Return of the Fox"
- Released: October 1981
- Recorded: 1981
- Genre: Progressive rock; Christmas
- Length: 4:01
- Label: Atlantic
- Songwriters: Chris Squire, Alan White, Peter Sinfield
- Producers: Chris Squire, Alan White

"Run with the Fox" is a 1981 Christmas song written, composed, produced, and performed by Chris Squire and Alan White, with Peter Sinfield co-writing lyrics. Both former Yes members, Squire and White recorded the song after a new band (XYZ with Led Zeppelin guitarist Jimmy Page) seemed unlikely to happen, and released the single under their own names as a collaborative piece.

Andrew Pryce Jackman, a childhood friend and frequent collaborator of Squire, was in charge of orchestration and since they had both been boy choristers with Barry Rose at St. Andrew's Church, Kingsbury, they contacted him to provide a boys choir to do the backing. By this time Rose was at St Paul's Cathedral, so it is the St Paul's boys who appear on the song. The B-side of the single, "Return of the Fox", is an instrumental variation of "Run with the Fox". It features Dave Lawson on keyboards and Squire's then-wife Nikki on backing vocals. Following "Run with the Fox", both musicians collaborated again in the band Cinema, which ultimately led to the reformation of Yes. The song would feature on Squire's festive album Chris Squire's Swiss Choir with another choir dubbed onto the track, but otherwise remaining the same. The melody includes elements of the classic Christmas song, the "Sussex Carol".

== Personnel ==
- Chris Squire – lead vocals, bass guitar, production
- Alan White – drums, piano, keyboards, backing vocals, production
- The boys of St Paul's Cathedral – choir
- Unknown recorder player
- Unknown orchestra – strings
- Andrew Pryce Jackman – orchestration
- Nigel Luby – recording
- Gregg Jackman – mixing
