= Barry Rose =

British organist and choir director (born 1934)

Barry Michael Rose OBE FRAM FRSCM HonFRCO (born 24 May 1934) is a choir trainer and organist. He is best known for founding the choir and the pattern of daily sung worship at the new Guildford Cathedral in 1961, as well as directing the music at the 1981 wedding of Charles, Prince of Wales and Diana, Princess of Wales at St Paul's Cathedral in London.

== Biography ==
=== Early life ===
Born in the borough of Chingford, Essex, England, Rose grew up playing hymns on the piano at his local Sunday school, and later accompanying the choir on the harmonium at the mission church of St Anne's in Chingford Hatch. Upon leaving the Sir George Monoux Grammar School, Walthamstow, at the age of 16, Rose worked in the insurance departments of W. H. Smith & Son and Joseph Rank Ltd.

=== Career ===
In 1956, he joined Martindale Sidwell's choir at Hampstead Parish Church as a bass, and eighteen months later became organist and choirmaster at St Andrew's Church, Kingsbury. While at Kingsbury, Sir Thomas Armstrong offered Rose a place at the Royal Academy of Music to study organ with C. H. Trevor. In April 1960, whilst still a 25-year-old unqualified academy student, Rose became the youngest cathedral organist in the country when he was appointed as the first Organist & Master of the Choristers at the new Guildford Cathedral.

At Guildford he founded a choir to sing the daily services, their first public appearance being the service of consecration on 17 May 1961 in the presence of Queen Elizabeth II, and Duke of Edinburgh. The choir made several recordings in the cathedral for EMI Records, of which some were awarded platinum, gold, and silver status.

In 1971, Rose succeeded George Thalben-Ball as Religious Music Adviser to the BBC's Head of Religious Broadcasting, a post he was to hold until 1990. In 1974, he had been invited to move to St Paul's Cathedral, London, initially as sub-organist, and in 1977 was appointed to the specially created post of Master of the Choir. He took over those duties at the Silver Jubilee Service for Queen Elizabeth II on 3 June 1977, for which he wrote a setting of Psalm 121. He subsequently directed the choir in their daily worship services, several state occasions, as well as a visit to the US and Canada in June 1980. Under Rose's direction, the choir explored popular music and made a gold-selling recording of "My Way", and performed on the Chris Squire and Alan White Christmas single "Run with the Fox"; Squire was a former Kingsbury choirboy. Soloists from the choir also provided the original recordings of "Walking in the Air" from The Snowman (Peter Auty), and the closing signature tune – Geoffrey Burgon's setting of the Nunc Dimittis – for the TV series Tinker, Tailor, Soldier, Spy (Paul Phoenix). Several of the choristers also took part in the Paul McCartney song "We All Stand Together" for the animated film Rupert and the Frog Song.

Rose left St Paul's in 1984 after a major dispute with the Dean and Chapter. Thence, he was invited and took up the position of Master of the Choirs in The King's School, Canterbury. His last cathedral post was in 1988, as Master of the Music at the Cathedral and Abbey Church of St Alban, from which he retired on Christmas Day 1997. During his tenure there, the choir recorded and broadcast regularly and toured the USA five times in the space of nine years.

In 1997, with his spouse and three offspring, Rose moved to the village of Draycott in Somerset, from where he has continued his musical work, mainly with choirs in the United States, South Africa, Australia and New Zealand. He also finds time to indulge his passion in collecting and restoring vintage fountain pens.

In the 1998 Birthday Honours list, Rose was appointed OBE for his services to cathedral music and in December 2021, he self-published his memoirs, entitled Sitting on a Pin.

Each February, Dr. Rose spends time on the East Coast of the USA, where he has directed a 2 or 3 choirs' festival since 1996, and, health permitting, he hopes to do the same yet again, in 2027. He also has a long-time contact with the choristers of Grace Church in New York, for whom he has written several compositions for upper voices.

His latest musical project ORGANO PLANO (Play Like A Ninety-year Old) is a monthly alphabetical look at composers for the organ, filmed in his local village church in Somerset, UK. Beginning in January 2026 with the letter A (Malcolm Archer), it has now released 9 episodes (up to the letter I), with more to be filmed in November 2026.

Cultural offices
Preceded by Ronald Dussek	Organist and Master of the Choristers of Guildford Cathedral; 1961–1974	Succeeded by Philip Moore
Preceded by Colin Walsh	Organist and Master of the Music of St Albans Cathedral; 1988–1997	Succeeded by Andrew Lucas
