= Jeremy Stacey =

British drummer

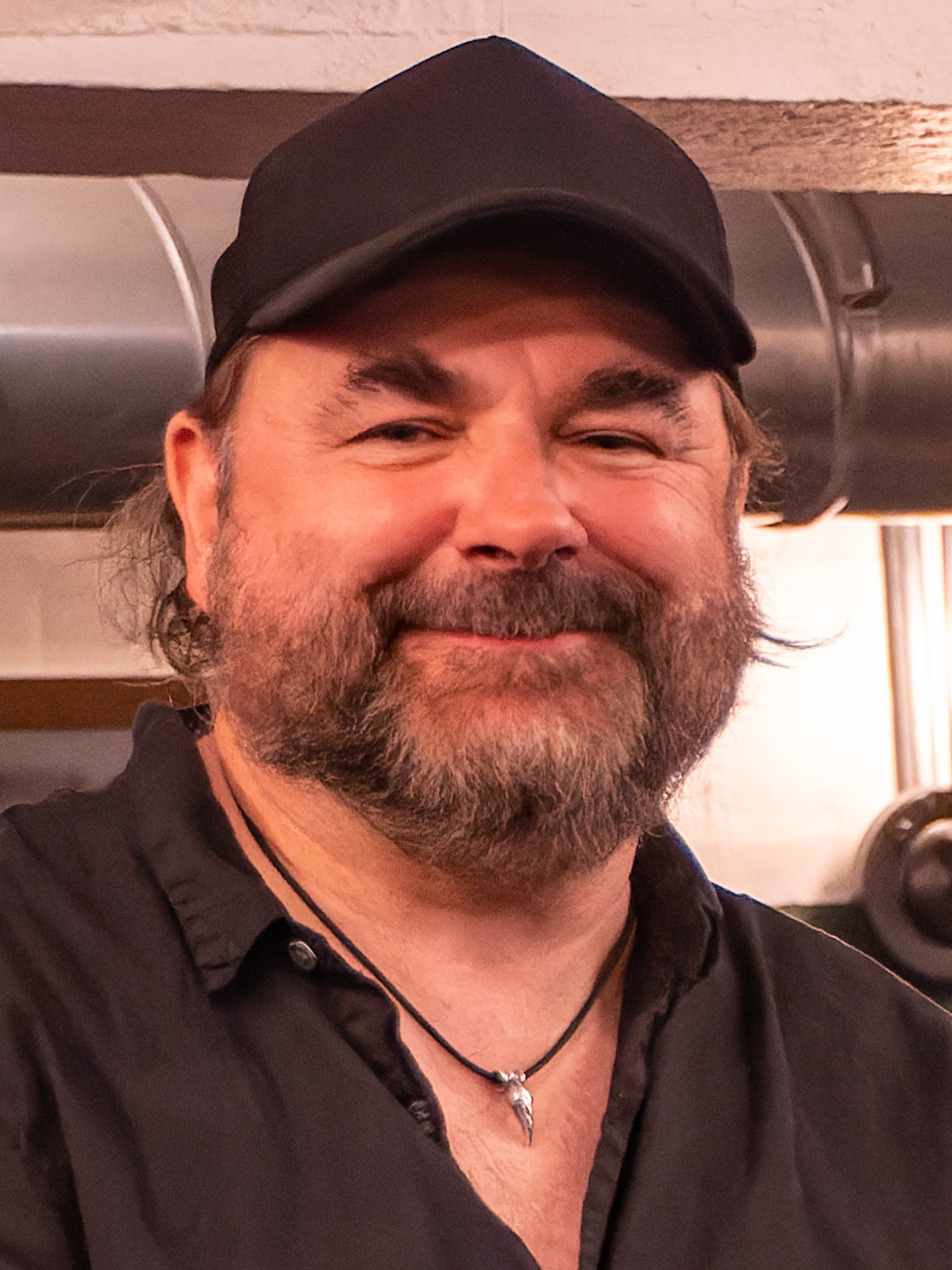
- Stacey in 2022

Background information
- Born: 27 September 1963 (age 62)
- Origin: London, England
- Genres: Alternative rock, pop rock, progressive rock
- Occupation: Musician
- Instruments: Drums, keyboards
- Formerly of: The Lemon Trees; The Waterboys; The Syn; Noel Gallagher's High Flying Birds; King Crimson

Jeremy Stacey (born 27 September 1963) is a British drummer and keyboard player. His early works included the 1990s band The Lemon Trees (with twin brother Paul Stacey on guitars, Guy Chambers and others) and Denzil. He has also played with Sheryl Crow, the Finn Brothers, Nick Harper, Noel Gallagher, The Waterboys, Thomas Anders, Echo & the Bunnymen, Eurythmics, Joe Cocker, Chris Robinson of the Black Crowes, Adam F, Andrea Bocelli, Patricia Kaas, Susanna Hoffs, Mike Scott, Robbie Williams, Aztec Camera, Charlotte Gainsbourg, Nerina Pallot, Claire Martin (drums on Take 1My Heart, 1999), Mark Wingfield, Iain Ballamy, Chris Squire (Chris Squire's Swiss Choir), The Syn (Syndestructible, 2005, again with Paul Stacey), Sia (Colour the Small One), Laurence Cottle, Jason Rebello, Zero 7, Malcolm McLaren, Boris Grebenshchikov, Steve Hackett, and the David Cross Band.

In 2011 he recorded with Ryan Adams on Ashes & Fire, and again on Ryan Adams in 2014.

He was part of Noel Gallagher's High Flying Birds.

He played on the Squackett album (with Chris Squire & Steve Hackett).

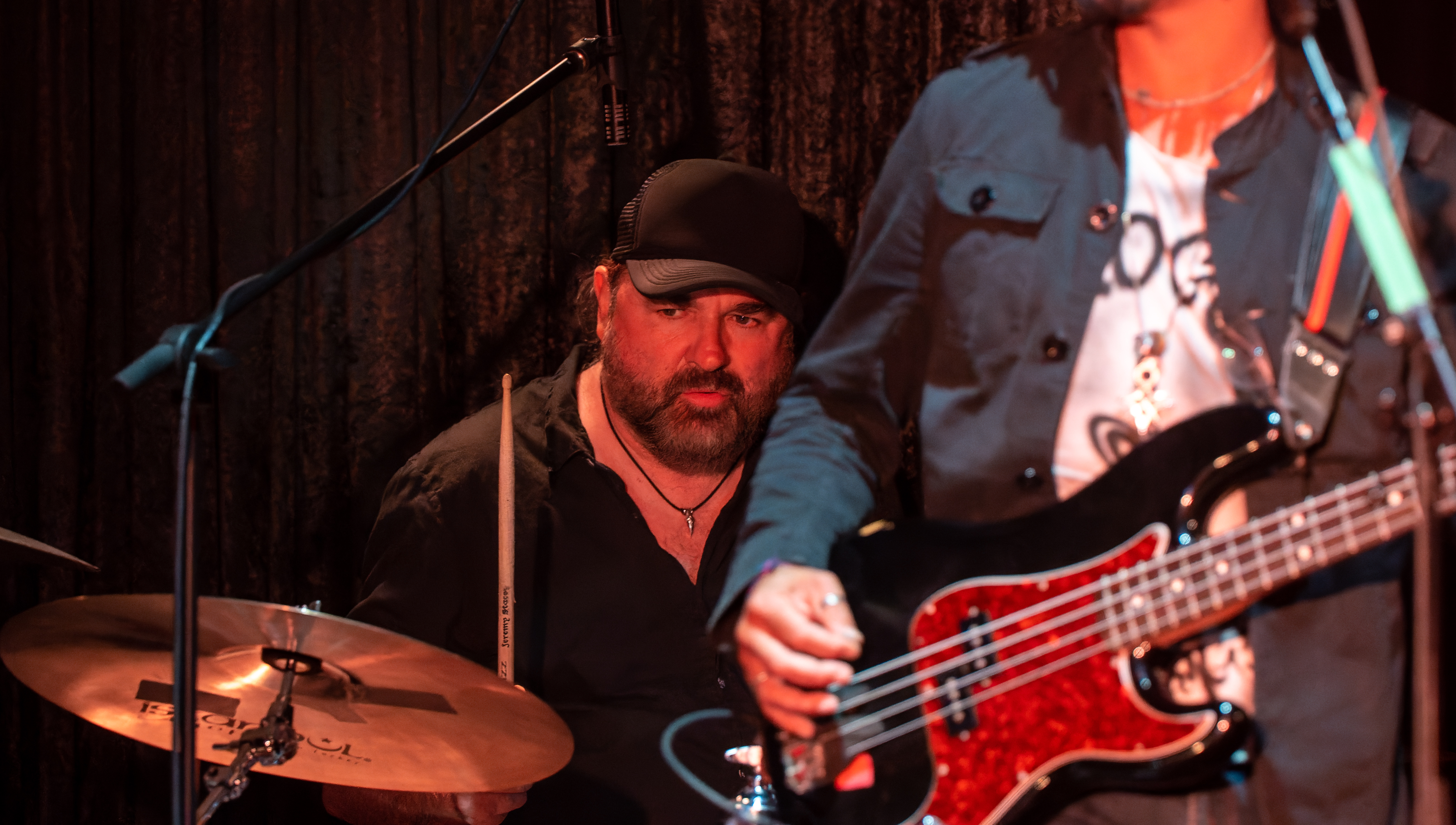
Stacey performing with Dom Brown in 2022

On 7 March 2016 it was announced that he would be taking the place of Bill Rieflin as the centre of three drummers on the 2016 King Crimson European tour, also doubling on keyboards and synthesizers as Rieflin had previously done, this was his first notable appearance on keyboards. He retained this position after Rieflin's return to the band exclusively on keyboards.

He also played on Steven Wilson's album To the Bone and in August 2025 he appeared with the David Cross Band at the A New Day festival at Mount Ephraim Gardens, Hernhill, Kent.

He uses Tama drums, Remo drumheads and Istanbul Agop cymbals. He formerly used Zildjian cymbals.

== Collaborations ==
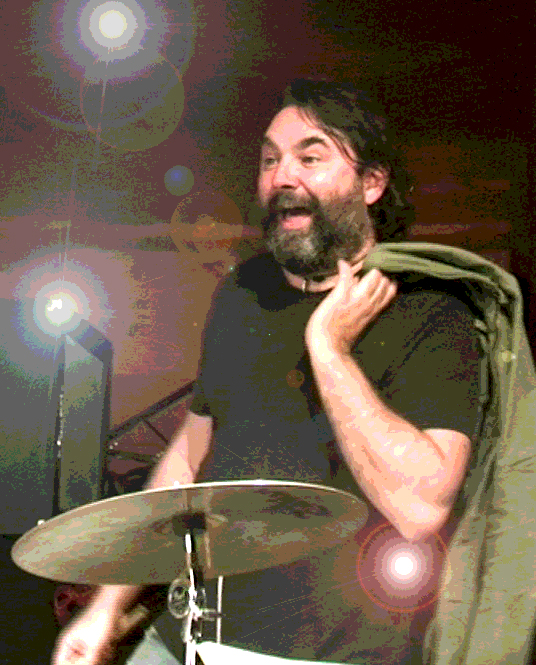
Stacey in 2009

With Robbie Williams

- I've Been Expecting You (Chyrsalis Records, 1998)
- Sing When You're Winning (Chrysalis Records, 2000)
- Escapology (EMI, 2002)
- Swings Both Ways (Island Records, 2013)
- The Heavy Entertainment Show (Columbia Records, 2016)

With Will Young

- From Now On (RCA Records, 2002)

With Patricia Kaas

- Je te dis vous (Columbia Records, 1993)

With Duncan James

- Future Past (Innocent Records, 2006)

With Nerina Pallot

- Dear Frustrated Superstar (Polydor Records, 2001)
- Fires (Idaho Records, 2006)

With Thomas Anders

- Different (Teldec, 1989)

With Echo & the Bunnymen

- What Are You Going to Do with Your Life? (London Records, 1999)

With Charlotte Gainsbourg

- 5:55 (Atlantic Records, 2006)

With Gary Barlow

- Since I Saw You Last (Polydor Records, 2013)

With Eric Clapton

- Clapton (Reprise Records, 2010)

With Susanna Hoffs

- Susanna Hoffs (London Records, 1996)

With Mary Chapin Carpenter

- Sometimes Just the Sky (Lambent Light Records, 2018)

With Joe Cocker

- No Ordinary World (Parlophone Records, 1999)

With Beverley Knight

- Affirmation (Parlophone Records, 2004)

With Neil Diamond

- Melody Road (Capitol Records, 2014)

With Noel Gallagher's High Flying Birds

- Noel Gallagher's High Flying Birds (Sour Mash Records, 2011)
- Chasing Yesterday (Sour Mash Records, 2015)
- Who Built The Moon? (Sour Mash Records, 2017)
- Council Skies (Sour Mash Records, 2023)

With James Morrison

- Undiscovered (Polydor Records, 2006)

With Sheryl Crow

- C'mon, C'mon (A&M Records, 2002)
- Detours (A&M Records, 2008)

With Ryan Adams

- Ashes & Fire (Capitol Records, 2011)
- Ryan Adams (PAX AM, 2014)

With David Cross and Peter Banks

- Crossover (2020)

With Scott McKeon

- New Morning (2021)

With The Lickerish Quartet (2017–2022)

- Threesome Vol. 1 (2020)
- Threesome Vol. 2 (2021)
- Threesome Vol. 3 (2022)
