= Meshuggah discography =

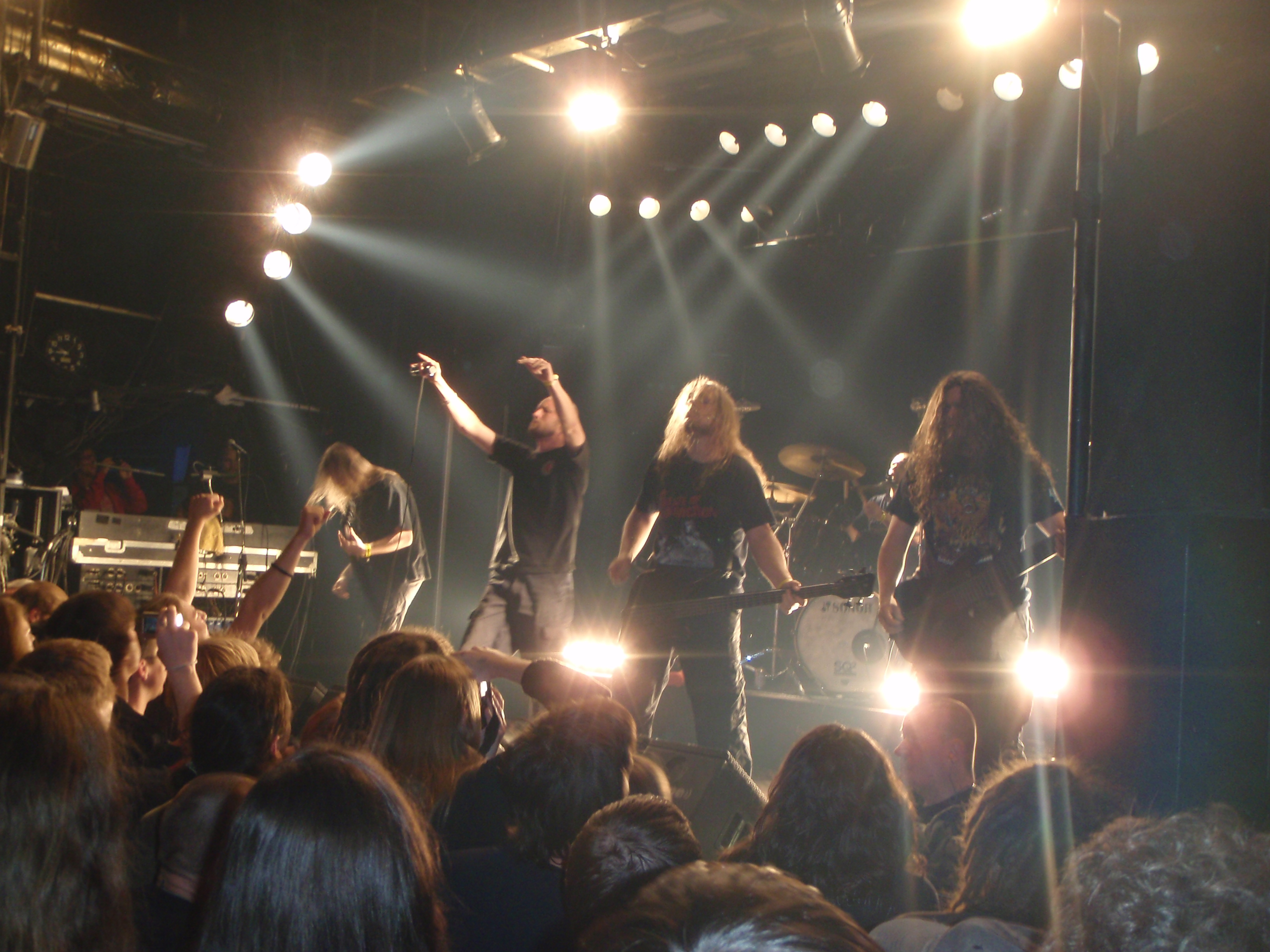
- Meshuggah performing live in 2008
- Studio albums: 9
- Extended plays: 6
- Live albums: 2
- Compilation albums: 1
- Music videos: 12

Meshuggah is a Swedish extreme metal band formed in 1987 in Umeå. Meshuggah is known for its use of extended polymetric passages, complex time signatures, dissonant guitar riffs, and harsh vocals. As of 2008, the band consists of vocalist Jens Kidman, guitarists Fredrik Thordendal and Mårten Hagström, bassist Dick Lövgren and drummer Tomas Haake.

Meshuggah's first release was a self-titled three-song 12" vinyl EP, Meshuggah, which is commonly known as Psykisk Testbild, although that title is not printed anywhere. Only 1000 copies were released by local record store Garageland in Umeå. After signing to German heavy metal record label Nuclear Blast, Meshuggah released its debut album Contradictions Collapse in 1991. Meshuggah's second album, Destroy Erase Improve, was released in 1995.

Thordendal's side project's album, Sol Niger Within, was released in 1997, as was the next Meshuggah EP, The True Human Design. These were followed by the next full-length album, Chaosphere, in 1998.

A collection of demos (from Meshuggah) and rare recordings were released as the Rare Trax album in 2001. In 2002 the band released their next album, Nothing. Meshuggah was not satisfied with the production of the album and later re-recorded the guitars for the re-release in 2006, which also includes a bonus DVD that features the band's appearance at the Download 2005 festival, along with the official music videos for "Rational Gaze", "Shed" and "New Millennium Cyanide Christ". Meshuggah released I in 2004, a single 21-minute track, and in 2005 the band released the next full-length album, Catch Thirtythree, a 47-minute song divided up into 13 movements, the only album with programmed drums. In 2008, Meshuggah released obZen, followed by Koloss in 2012 and The Violent Sleep of Reason in 2016. Their newest album, Immutable, was released in 2022.

== Studio albums ==
Title	Album details	Peak chart positions										Sales
Title	Album details	SWE	FIN	FRA	GER	JPN	NOR	SWI	UK	US	US Ind.	Sales
Contradictions Collapse	Released: May 1991; Label: Nuclear Blast; Formats: CD, CS, LP, DL	—	—	—	—	—	—	—	—	—	—	
Destroy Erase Improve	Released: May 12, 1995; Label: Nuclear Blast; Formats: CD, CS, LP, DL	43	—	—	—	—	—	—	—	—	—	US: 31,390+
Chaosphere	Released: November 9, 1998; Label: Nuclear Blast; Formats: CD, CS, LP, DL	—	—	—	—	—	—	—	—	—	—	US: 35,232+
Nothing	Released: August 6, 2002; Label: Nuclear Blast; Formats: CD, CS, LP, DL	41	—	—	—	—	—	—	—	165	10	US: 110,000+
Catch Thirtythree	Released: May 31, 2005; Label: Nuclear Blast; Formats: CD, LP, DL	12	—	41	—	—	—	—	—	170	13	US: 6,954+
obZen	Released: March 7, 2008; Label: Nuclear Blast; Formats: CD, LP, DL	16	21	23	—	177	—	11	151	59	—	US: 82,000
Koloss	Released: March 27, 2012; Label: Nuclear Blast; Formats: CD, LP, DL	12	7	20	48	88	19	39	93	17	2	US: 42,300+
The Violent Sleep of Reason	Released: October 7, 2016; Label: Nuclear Blast; Formats: CD, LP, DL	17	11	56	18	79	—	21	32	17	3	US: 18,000 in its first week
Immutable	Released: April 1, 2022; Label: Atomic Fire; Formats: CD, LP, DL	3	6	74	6	106	—	6	38	115	15	US: 10,000 in its first week
"—" denotes a recording that did not chart or was not released in that territory.

== Live albums ==
Title	Album details	Peak chart positions			Sales
Title	Album details	SWE	FRA	GRC	Sales
Alive	Released: February 5, 2010; Label: Nuclear Blast; Formats: CD, LP, DVD, DL	43	149	25	US: 3,000+
The Ophidian Trek	Released: September 26, 2014; Label: Nuclear Blast; Formats: CD, DVD, BD	—	—	—	
"—" denotes a recording that did not chart or was not released in that territory.

== Compilation albums ==
Title	Album details
Rare Trax	Released: August 21, 2001; Label: Nuclear Blast; Formats: CD, DL

== EPs ==
Title	EP details	Peak chart positions
Title	EP details	SWE
Meshuggah	Released: February 1989; Label: Garageland	—
None	Released: November 8, 1994; Label: Nuclear Blast	—
Selfcaged	Released: April 11, 1995; Label: Nuclear Blast	—
The True Human Design	Released: August 19, 1997; Label: Nuclear Blast	—
I	Released: July 13, 2004; Label: Fractured Transmitter	33
Pitch Black	Released: February 5, 2013; Label: Scion Audio/Visual	—
"—" denotes a recording that did not chart.

== Music videos ==
Song	Year	Director(s)
"Abnegating Cecity"	1991	Meshuggah
"Transfixion"	1995	Meshuggah
"Terminal Illusions"	1995	Meshuggah
"New Millennium Cyanide Christ"	1999	Meshuggah
"Rational Gaze"	2002	Torbjorn Oyervold
"Shed"	2005	Matthias Haase
"Rational Gaze" (Mr. Kidman Delirium Version)	2006	Jens Kidman
"Bleed"	2008	Ian McFarland; Mike Pecci
"Break Those Bones Whose Sinews Gave It Motion"	2012	Owe Lingvall
"Demiurge"	2012	Anthony Dubois
"I Am Colossus"	2013	Magnus Jonsson
"Clockworks"	2016	Julius Horsthuis
"The Abysmal Eye"	2022	Scott Hansen
"Broken Cog"	2022	Scott Hansen
"I Am That Thirst"	2022	Scott Hansen
"Ligature Marks"	2025	Anthony Dubois
