= Sonor =

German musical instrument manufacturer

- Type: Private
- Industry: Musical instruments
- Founded: 1875; 151 years ago
- Headquarters: Bad Berleburg, North Rhine-Westphalia, Germany
- Area served: Worldwide
- Products: Drum kits and hardware
- Parent: KHS Musical Instruments
- Website: sonor.com

Sonor is a German musical instrument manufacturing company headquartered in Bad Berleburg. Established in 1875, it is one of the oldest percussion companies in the world. Sonor currently manufactures drum kits and hardware.

Apart from drum kits, Sonor also manufactured a wide range of other percussion instruments through its history. Some of them were frame drums, bongo drums, djembes, Cajons, timbales, congas, tambourines, maracas, guiros, glockenspiel, cymbals and mallets.

== History ==
The company was founded in 1875 as a percussion instruments manufacturer. One of the oldest existing models of drums manufactured by Sonor is a 1942 Johannes Link Parade Snare, a very heavy snare drum with an aluminum shell and thick tension rods.

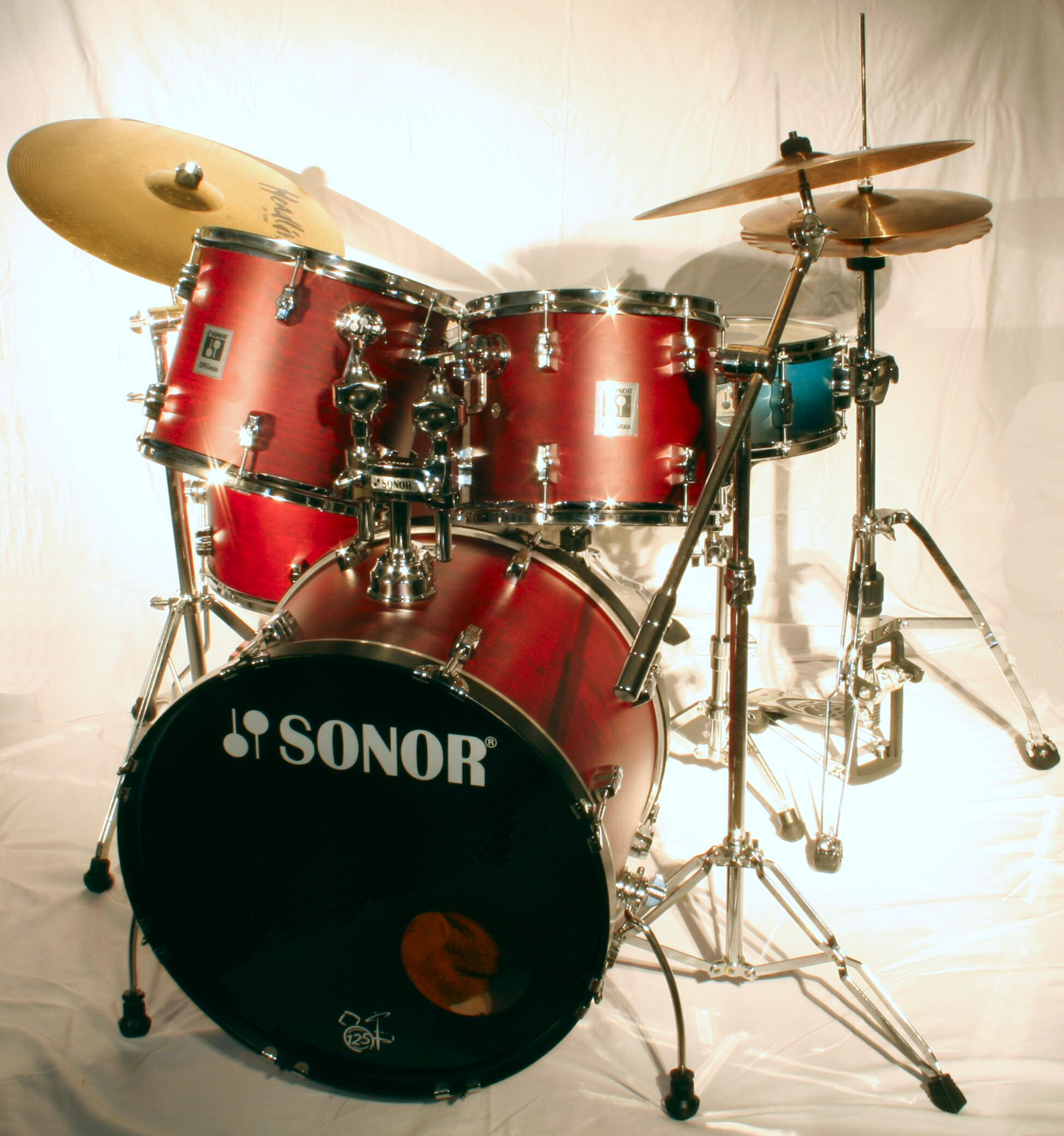
A drum-set made by Sonor, cymbals by Meinl and Paiste

In the 1980s, Sonor's tagline was "The Rolls of drums". The drums were made of very thick (13 mm) and heavy shells that were beech wood, with an innermost and outermost ply of furniture-grade veneers, such as rosewood and bubinga. Nicko McBrain of Iron Maiden was one of the most prominent Sonor artists of the 1980s and 1990s, along with Mikkey Dee of Motörhead, Steve Smith of Journey, Phil Rudd of AC/DC, Danny Carey of Tool, Thomas Haake of Meshuggah, Glenn Kotche of Wilco, Gavin Harrison of Porcupine Tree, jazz/fusion artist Jojo Mayer and jazz legend Jack DeJohnette.

Sonor invented the modern screw thread drum-construction and the metal snare drum in the early 20th century. William F. Ludwig got this idea in his early years back in Germany from Sonor and began to use it later in Chicago.

As the 1980s progressed, the market began to stray away from thick heavy shells, and Sonor started slimming down its shells with a line called "Sonorlite" and "Hilite", a step more towards the idea that a drum shell should resonate like a violin or guitar body. The thinner the shell, the lower the fundamental tone.

Sonor drums have several design features, including undersized shells (a similar concept to a violin bridge - designed to enhance response), and tension rods that are round and feature a slot instead of the traditional square style (though recently Sonor made square heads standard, with slotted heads available as an option). Recently, Sonor reintroduced the designer X-Ray Acrylic drums, the first time in 20 years Sonor offered acrylic drums. These shells are made from seamless, extruded acrylic and feature acrylic hoops.

In 1953, the Orff instruments were officially included in Sonor’s production plan. In close collaboration with Professor Hans Bergese, a student of Carl Orff, Sonor developed a range of instruments. The basic idea was that the instruments should grow with the mental abilities and playing techniques of the child, thus encouraging active music making.
