= The Violent Sleep of Reason =

Studio album by Meshuggah
- Released: 7 October 2016
- Recorded: Puk Recording Studios, Gjerlev, Denmark
- Genres: Extreme metal; progressive metal; avant-garde metal
- Length: 58:55
- Label: Nuclear Blast
- Producers: Tue Madsen, Meshuggah

Meshuggah chronology
Pitch Black (2013)	The Violent Sleep of Reason (2016)	Immutable (2022)

Singles from The Violent Sleep of Reason
- 1. "Born in Dissonance" Released: 25 August 2016

The Violent Sleep of Reason is the eighth studio album by Swedish extreme metal band Meshuggah. It was released on 7 October 2016 via Nuclear Blast. This album was recorded live in the studio, simultaneously with all members, rather than recording each instrument separately as is more common for modern recording. The band announced the new album, its title, and track list via Blabbermouth.net and Revolver magazine on 5 August 2016.

== Background ==
The album's title was loosely inspired by The Sleep of Reason Produces Monsters, an etching by Spanish painter Francisco Goya. The album's title and lyrical themes are a commentary on terrorism, extremist views on ideals, religious dogma, and the violent implications of "being asleep, so to speak, or not reacting to what's going on in the proper way". Concerning the album artwork, Tomas Haake stated:

"It was a hard one in the sense that you don't immediately have a visual to the title The Violent Sleep of Reason – how do you portray that?

"So when discussing this with Keerych Luminokaya, who also did the artwork for our 25th anniversary box set along with the artwork for Koloss, we just let him loose on that idea and how to portray that.

"What you're seeing on the artwork is basically a human being that's been in stasis for a long time. The vines were the original idea – they're growing into him. But it's a body that's been asleep for so long that it's been taken over by something else."

In an attempt to depart from the production on previous albums like Koloss and obZen, this album was recorded live. According to Haake, this allowed the band to capture their sound more "honestly" and to capture the "rawness" of albums from the late '80s and early '90s that "inspired us when we were growing up." Haake elaborated:

"If you put it all together using computers then you often have to fix problems after the fact. I've gone back to records where I've not known every drum part. And once you do that you can start with drums and then just add layers of guitars and then bass and it all sounds perfect.

"ObZen and Koloss are great albums but, to me, they are a little too perfect. It didn't really capture what we sounded like honestly.

"But where we recorded live you get to hear the push and pull, one person might be a little ahead and the other might be a little behind. If you kill that, you can kill the energy."

Bassist Dick Lövgren for the first time contributed significantly to the writing of most songs for the album. Lead guitarist Fredrik Thordendal wrote the least on this album than ever in his career due to rumored side project which is a second album continued from Sol Niger Within. This caused him to rollout from live performances. Mårten Hagström used a 28" scale guitar instead of 29.4" due to arthritis problems to shoulder.

== Release ==
In advance of the album, three songs were released on the YouTube channel of the band's record label, Nuclear Blast. "Born in Dissonance", also released as a single, was uploaded on 25 August 2016; a lyric video for "Nostrum" was released on 15 September 2016, while the official video for "Clockworks" was released on 7 October 2016. On 20 September 2016 the band released a live play-through drum cam video of "Nostrum" highlighting Tomas Haake's drum playing. A live drum play-through of "Clockworks" was released on 12 October 2016, which has over 3 million views worldwide.

== Reception ==
Professional ratings
Aggregate scores
Source	Rating
Metacritic	83/100
Review scores
Source	Rating
AllMusic	4/5 stars
Exclaim!	4/5 stars
Kerrang!	5/5 stars
Pitchfork	6.5/10
Metal Injection	8/10 stars
MetalSucks	5/5 stars
Terrorizer	8.5/10

The Violent Sleep of Reason has received universal acclaim from critics and fans alike. A review by Max Frank on the popular site Metalsucks.net gave the album five out of five stars and described it as a "tour-de-force; a total deconstruction of heavy music." The review focuses on a paradox between what it describes as complex composition structures that seem to critique the norms of the metal genre, and some of the band members' professed ignorance of music theory. Frank states, "Theoreticians out there might say that Violent Sleep is 'a commentary on itself.' Meshuggah would probably respond 'shut up and check out this sick riff.'" Terrorizer critic Adrien Begrand called the album "masterful", saying that the band's "signature sound is all over this record", and "like every past album the formula is tinkered with, to exacting detail and precision." Stefan Andonov of Prog Sphere wrote, "They continue their tradition of producing 'punch-you-in-the-face' aggressive music that is hard to follow, but The Violent Sleep of Reason will completely satisfy the fans of the band and surely attract more metalheads to fall in love with the phenomenal art they create." The album was shortlisted by IMPALA (The Independent Music Companies Association) for the Album of the Year Award 2016, which rewards on a yearly basis the best album released on an independent European label.

Meshuggah received a Grammy nomination for their song "Clockworks" under the "Best Metal Performance" category.

=== Accolades ===
Publication	Accolade	Year	Rank
Metal Injection	Metal Injection Writers' Overall Top 20 Albums of 2016	2016	2
Loudwire	20 Best Metal Albums of 2016	2016	3
Rolling Stone	20 Best Metal Albums of 2016	2016	2

== Track listing ==
All lyrics by Tomas Haake except "Ivory Tower" by Mårten Hagström.

No.	Title	Music	Length
1.	"Clockworks"	Haake, Lövgren	7:15
2.	"Born in Dissonance"	Hagström	4:34
3.	"MonstroCity"	Haake, Lövgren	6:13
4.	"By the Ton"	Haake, Lövgren	6:04
5.	"Violent Sleep of Reason"	Haake, Lövgren	6:51
6.	"Ivory Tower"	Hagström	4:59
7.	"Stifled"	Haake, Lövgren	6:31
8.	"Nostrum"	Haake, Lövgren	5:15
9.	"Our Rage Won't Die"	Haake, Hagström	4:41
10.	"Into Decay"	Haake, Hagström	6:32
Total length:			58:55

== Personnel ==
=== Meshuggah ===
- Jens Kidman – vocals
- Fredrik Thordendal – lead guitar
- Mårten Hagström – rhythm guitar
- Dick Lövgren – bass
- Tomas Haake – drums

=== Production ===
- Luminokaya – artwork
- Thomas Eberger - mastering
- Tue Madsen – mixing, engineering

== Charts ==
Chart (2016)	Peak position
Australian Albums (ARIA)	9
Austrian Albums (Ö3 Austria)	31
Belgian Albums (Ultratop Flanders)	47
Belgian Albums (Ultratop Wallonia)	32
Canadian Albums (Billboard)	18
Music Canada (MC)	9
Dutch Albums (Album Top 100)	60
Finnish Albums (Suomen virallinen lista)	11
French Albums (SNEP)	75
German Albums (Offizielle Top 100)	18
Hungarian Albums (MAHASZ)	34
Italian Albums (FIMI)	57
Japanese Albums (Oricon)	79
New Zealand Heatseekers Albums (RMNZ)	2
Scottish Albums (Official Charts)	21
Swedish Albums (Sverigetopplistan)	17
Swiss Albums (Schweizer Hitparade)	21
UK Albums (OCC)	32
US Billboard 200	17
US Top Hard Rock Albums (Billboard)	3
