= Nothing (Meshuggah album) =

Studio album by Meshuggah
- Released: 6 August 2002
- Recorded: May–June 2002
- Genres: Progressive metal; groove metal; avant-garde metal; djent
- Length: 52:37
- Label: Nuclear Blast

Meshuggah chronology
Rare Trax (2001)	Nothing (2002)	I (2004)

Remastered edition cover

Nothing is the fourth studio album by Swedish extreme metal band Meshuggah, originally released on 6 August 2002 by Nuclear Blast. The album entered the Billboard 200 chart at number 165, slightly higher than the band's following effort, Catch Thirtythree.

A last-minute decision to join 2002's Ozzfest tour forced the band to mix the album in two days and to master it in one. As a result, the album had its guitars and drums re-recorded for a remastered re-release in 2006.

In 2013, the staff of Loudwire included the main riff in the song "Rational Gaze" in their list of "the 10 Best Metal Riffs of the 2000s".

== Musical style ==
The songs on this album consist of slower tempos and a heavy focus on groove instead of the thrash metal style of previous albums. Jazz fusion elements such as the interludes found in some songs on the band's Destroy Erase Improve album are still present in this release.

This is also the first album on which guitarists Fredrik Thordendal and Mårten Hagström experimented with 8-string guitars by re-recording the guitar tracks, replacing the original performances made using detuned 7-string guitars, due in part to their custom Nevborn guitars not being ready.

== Release and reception ==
Professional ratings
Review scores
Source	Rating
AllMusic	4.5/5 stars
Blabbermouth.net	7.5/10
Collector's Guide to Heavy Metal	8/10
Ox-Fanzine	10/10
Pitchfork	8.1/10
PopMatters	9/10
Rolling Stone	3/5 stars
Stylus	B

The track "Rational Gaze" was promoted with three music videos. The first was a repetitive black-and-white sequence of pictures, and did not have much connection with the song structure; the second version, directed by Torbjörn Oyesvold, featured a blue-greenish environment with the band performing, heavy post-processed by blurry video filters; the third version, entitled "Mr. Kidman Delirium Version", was not an official video, but rather a handicam of Jens Kidman performing as his bandmates, with the help of different wigs. In January 2018, Loudwire named Nothing their favorite djent album.

Nothing has sold over 95,000 copies in the US.

=== Re-release ===
A re-recorded and remastered version of the album was released on 31 October 2006. The new version features new rhythm guitar tracks re-recorded with 8-string guitars. The drums were also re-recorded by using the original drum hits as triggers for new audio produced with virtual drum software. The vocals were not re-recorded, but were given effects processing.

There are two songs significantly modified from their original version. These include the tempo of "Nebulous" which was lowered, and the track length of "Obsidian" was nearly doubled with the ending fadeout removed.

The re-release also includes a DVD containing music videos and their Download Festival performance in 2005, as well as modified cover art.

== Track listing ==
Original 2002 Release:

All lyrics are written by Tomas Haake, except "Nebulous" by Mårten Hagström.

No.	Title	Music	Length
1.	"Stengah"	Hagström, Haake	5:38
2.	"Rational Gaze"	Thordendal	5:04
3.	"Perpetual Black Second"	Hagström	4:39
4.	"Closed Eye Visuals"	Thordendal	7:25
5.	"Glints Collide"	Thordendal, Haake	4:55
6.	"Organic Shadows"	Hagström, Haake	5:08
7.	"Straws Pulled at Random"	Hagström	5:10
8.	"Spasm"	Thordendal, Haake	4:14
9.	"Nebulous"	Hagström	6:33
10.	"Obsidian" (instrumental)	Meshuggah	4:20
Total length:			53:37

2006 Remastered Edition:

All lyrics are written by Tomas Haake, except "Nebulous" by Mårten Hagström.

No.	Title	Music	Length
1.	"Stengah"	Hagström, Haake	5:38
2.	"Rational Gaze"	Thordendal	5:26
3.	"Perpetual Black Second"	Hagström	4:39
4.	"Closed Eye Visuals"	Thordendal	7:25
5.	"Glints Collide"	Thordendal, Haake	4:56
6.	"Organic Shadows"	Hagström, Haake	5:20
7.	"Straws Pulled at Random"	Hagström	5:16
8.	"Spasm"	Thordendal, Haake	4:14
9.	"Nebulous"	Hagström	7:06
10.	"Obsidian" (instrumental)	Meshuggah	8:35
Total length:			58:35

DVD track listing (Remastered edition)
No.	Title	Length
1.	"Straws Pulled at Random" (live at Download 2005)
2.	"In Death—Is Death" (live at Download 2005)
3.	"Future Breed Machine" (live at Download 2005)
4.	"Rational Gaze" (music video)
5.	"Shed" (music video)
6.	"New Millennium Cyanide Christ" (music video)
7.	"Rational Gaze" (Mr. Kidman Delirium version)

== Personnel ==
- Jens Kidman − vocals
- Fredrik Thordendal − lead guitar, bass, rhythm guitar on the 2006 re-release
- Mårten Hagström − rhythm guitar, bass
- Tomas Haake − drums, spoken vocals (tracks 4, 8-9), artwork

== Charts ==
Chart (2002)	Peak position
Swedish Albums (Sverigetopplistan)	41
US Billboard 200	165
