= I (Meshuggah EP) =

EP by Meshuggah
- Released: 13 July 2004
- Recorded: 2004
- Venues: Distortion Festival (Eindhoven, Netherlands) (tracks 2-3)
- Studios: Fear and Loathing Studios (Stockholm, Sweden) (tracks 1, 4)
- Genres: Progressive metal; avant-garde metal
- Length: 21:00
- Label: Fractured Transmitter

Meshuggah chronology
Nothing (2002)	I (2004)	Catch Thirtythree (2005)

Professional ratings
Review scores
Source	Rating
AllMusic	2.5/5 stars
Kerrang!	4/5 stars
Pitchfork	(8.3/10)
Spin	B+
Sputnikmusic	4.5/5 stars

I is the fifth EP by Swedish extreme metal band Meshuggah. It was released on 13 July 2004 via Fractured Transmitter Recording Company. A remastered reissue was released on 30 September 2014.

The "Special Edition" adds "Bleed" and "Dancers to a Discordant System" live from The Ophidian Trek and Pitch Black.

== Background ==
The title track of the EP is notable for its chaotic nature; while the song has distinct sections, the sections themselves feature very little repetition or rhythmic patterns. Meshuggah drummer Tomas Haake said of the EP, "That whole track was written and recorded just on random. Me and Fredrik would just jam on something, and when we found something that was kind of cool, he would walk into the control room. I would just record drums and it wasn't a set pattern, I would just kind of stray away from the pattern, but just keep going in that vibe. Then we had to chart everything and go bar by bar to record the guitars afterwards, because it's all just random." Thordendal would later post the chart of the first part of the song on his Instagram account.

Haake later commented that the song was "originally recorded for Jason Popson's Fractured Transmitter record label" and that it was a "'one-off' that Nuclear Blast gave us the go-ahead for — as we were under contract with them."

== Track listing ==
The original vinyl release has track 1 on side A, and tracks 2–4 on side B while the 2016 re-issue only has track 1

All lyrics are written by Mårten Hagstrom; all music is composed by Fredrik Thordendal & Tomas Haake.

No.	Title	Length
1.	"I"	21:00
Total length:		21:00

Reissue track listing
No.	Title	Length
1.	"I"	21:00
2.	"Bleed" (live)	7:33
3.	"Dancers to a Discordant System" (live)	9:48
4.	"Pitch Black"	5:57
Total length:		44:18

== Personnel ==
- Tomas Haake – drums, vocals
- Mårten Hagström – rhythm guitar
- Jens Kidman – lead vocals
- Fredrik Thordendal – lead guitar, bass (tracks 1, 4)
- Dick Lövgren – bass (tracks 2–3)
