= Meshuggah (EP) =

EP by Meshuggah
- Released: 1989
- Recorded: Umeå, Sweden
- Genre: Thrash metal; progressive metal
- Length: 19:23
- Label: Garageland

Meshuggah chronology
Meshuggah (1989)	Contradictions Collapse (1991)

Meshuggah, also known as Psykisk Testbild (Pronounced "see-kisk test-build") is the debut EP by Swedish extreme metal band Meshuggah. The three tracks on this EP were later reissued on the compilation Rare Trax. Although the EP is known as Psykisk Testbild ("mental test pattern"), this title is not to be found anywhere on the cover itself. It was released as a 12" vinyl record, limited to 1000 copies, by local record store Garageland in Umeå. This is the only Meshuggah record featuring drummer Niclas Lundgren. Tomas Haake later replaced Lundgren on drums. The track "Cadaverous Mastication" was included on their first studio album, Contradictions Collapse. The last track has a contribution from Johan Sjögren, who played guitar in the first lineup of the band together with his brother Per Sjögren, drums.

Professional ratings
Review scores
Source	Rating
Pitchfork	4.0/10

== Track listing ==
No.	Title	Lyrics	Music	Length
1.	"Cadaverous Mastication"	Kidman, Thordendal	Kidman, Thordendal, Niclas Lundgren	7:51
2.	"Sovereigns Morbidity"	Kidman	Kidman, Lundgren	4:31
3.	"The Debt of Nature"	Thordendal, Kidman	Thordendal, Kidman, Johan Sjögren	7:20

== Personnel ==
- Jens Kidman – lead vocals (tracks 1–2), rhythm guitar, backing vocals (track 3)
- Niclas Lundgren – drums, backing vocals
- Peter Nordin – bass, backing vocals
- Fredrik Thordendal – lead guitar, lead vocals (track 3), backing vocals (tracks 1–2)
