= Koloss =

Studio album by Meshuggah
- Released: 23 March 2012
- Studios: Fear and Loathing Studios (Stockholm, Sweden)
- Genres: Extreme metal; progressive metal; avant-garde metal; djent
- Length: 54:46
- Label: Nuclear Blast
- Producers: Daniel Bergstrand, Meshuggah

Meshuggah chronology
obZen (2008)	Koloss (2012)	Pitch Black (2013)

Singles from Koloss
- 1. "I Am Colossus" Released: 21 March 2012

Koloss is the seventh studio album by Swedish extreme metal band Meshuggah, released on 23 March 2012 in Germany, on 26 March in the rest of Europe, and on March 27 in North America, by Nuclear Blast.

== Background ==
Tomas Haake stated, "As always, we try to take our music in a slightly different direction with each album and with Koloss, we feel that we really nailed what we were going for. Organic brutality, viscera and groove all crammed into a 54-minute metalicious treat, best avoided by the faint of heart!!"

The Koloss album was different from others in terms of cooperation and making music together. Fredrik and Mårten worked together in creating a couple of songs together. Jens Kidman who retired from guitar playing since their debut album Contradictions Collapse composed "Behind the Sun".

== Release ==
The album was released on 23 March 2012 in Germany, 26 March in the rest of Europe and on March 27 in North America. It was released as a standard compact disc, as a digipak version featuring a bonus DVD, as a limited edition boxed set "magic cube" (a mock-Rubik's Cube featuring the album artwork, available only through Nuclear Blast mail-order), and a double-LP pressed on brown vinyl.

The album debuted at number 17 in the United States, with first week sales of 18,342 copies, the band's and record label's highest position on the charts. Koloss also debuted at number 27 on the Canadian Albums Chart.

== Reception ==
Professional ratings
Aggregate scores
Source	Rating
Metacritic	78/100
Review scores
Source	Rating
AllMusic	4/5 stars
Alternative Press	3/5 stars
The A.V. Club	B+
Decibel	8/10
Drowned in Sound	8/10 stars
Exclaim!	favourable
Spin Magazine	9/10
Sputnikmusic	4/5 stars
Pitchfork	8.2/10

Koloss received generally favorable reviews. Kory Grow of Spin Magazine called it "the first real contender for the genre's album of the year".

== Track listing ==
No.	Title	Lyrics	Music	Length
1.	"I Am Colossus"	Tomas Haake	Mårten Hagström, Fredrik Thordendal	4:43
2.	"The Demon's Name Is Surveillance"	Haake	Thordendal	4:39
3.	"Do Not Look Down"	Haake	Haake, Hagström, Thordendal	4:43
4.	"Behind the Sun"	Haake	Kidman	6:14
5.	"The Hurt That Finds You First"	Hagström	Hagström	5:33
6.	"Marrow"	Haake	Haake, Hagström, Thordendal	5:35
7.	"Break Those Bones Whose Sinews Gave It Motion"	Haake	Hagström	6:55
8.	"Swarm"	Haake	Haake, Hagström, Thordendal	5:26
9.	"Demiurge"	Hagström	Hagström	6:12
10.	"The Last Vigil"	(instrumental)	Hagström	4:32
Total length:				54:46

Limited edition DVD
No.	Title	Length
1.	"Konstrukting the Koloss" (Making of "Koloss")	25:00
2.	"Meshuggah in India" (Live in India)	26:25

=== I Am Colossus EP ===
"I Am Colossus" was released as a two-track EP. The stop-motion video for the song was compared to similar videos created by the band Tool.

No.	Title	Length
1.	"I Am Colossus"	4:43
2.	"I Am Colossus" (Engine-EarZ & Foreign Beggars Remix)	4:44

== Personnel ==
- Jens Kidman – vocals
- Fredrik Thordendal – lead guitar
- Mårten Hagström – rhythm guitar
- Dick Lövgren – bass
- Tomas Haake – drums
- Luminokaya – artwork

== Charts ==
Chart (2012)	Peak position
Australian Albums (ARIA)	36
Austrian Albums (Ö3 Austria)	46
Belgian Albums (Ultratop Flanders)	89
Canadian Albums (Billboard)	24
Finnish Albums (Suomen virallinen lista)	7
French Albums (SNEP)	120
German Albums (Offizielle Top 100)	48
Japanese Albums (Oricon)	88
Scottish Albums (Official Charts)	78
Swedish Albums (Sverigetopplistan)	12
Swiss Albums (Schweizer Hitparade)	39
UK Albums (OCC)	93
US Billboard 200	17
US Top Hard Rock Albums (Billboard)	3
