= Immutable (album) =

Studio album by Meshuggah
- Released: 1 April 2022
- Studios: Sweetspot Studios (Halmstad, Sweden)
- Genres: Progressive metal; technical death metal; djent
- Length: 66:43
- Label: Atomic Fire
- Producer: Meshuggah

Meshuggah chronology
The Violent Sleep of Reason (2016)	Immutable (2022)

Singles from Immutable
- 1. "The Abysmal Eye" Released: 28 January 2022; 2. "Light the Shortening Fuse" Released: 3 March 2022; 3. "I Am That Thirst" Released: 25 March 2022; 4. "Broken Cog" Released: 1 April 2022

Immutable is the ninth studio album by Swedish extreme metal band Meshuggah. It was released on April 1, 2022, via Atomic Fire Records, making it the band's first studio album to not be released through Nuclear Blast. The album was remastered and released as Immutable – The Indellible Edition on April 4th, 2025 with an addition of three live tracks.

== Background ==
Guitarist Mårten Hagström stated “The title Immutable fits perfectly for where we are as a band,” “We’re older now. Most of us are in our 50s now, and we’ve settled into who we are. Even though we’ve been experimenting all along, I also think we’ve been the same since day one.”

He continued: “The way we approach things and why we still make new albums, and why we still sound the way we do, it’s immutable. Humanity is immutable, too. We commit the same mistakes over and over. And we are immutable. We do what we do, and we don’t change.”

In addition, certain Meshuggah songs on Spotify leaked a URL, which was https://immutable.se/. Clicking the link would give the user a teaser of the song "Ligature Marks" and the release date.

The songs "The Abysmal Eye", "Light the Shortening Fuse" and "I Am That Thirst" were published as singles before the album release. Music videos were released for "The Abysmal Eye" and "Broken Cog".

== Reception ==
Professional ratings
Aggregate scores
Source	Rating
Metacritic	83/100
Review scores
Source	Rating
AllMusic	4/5 stars
Kerrang!	4/5
Metal Utopia	7/10

Immutable has received universal acclaim from critics with a score 83 out of 100 on Metacritic. Thom Jurek of AllMusic wrote: "Ultimately, Immutable delivers the very essence of Meshuggah. While comfortable in their collective skin, they continue expanding their reach by obliterating – hell, nearly swallowing – metal's genre boundaries in their long, relentless search for the undiscovered."

=== Accolades ===
Publication	List	Rank
Metal Hammer	The Best Metal Albums Of 2022 So Far	–

== Track listing ==
Standard edition
No.	Title	Lyrics	Music	Length
1.	"Broken Cog"	Mårten Hagström	Hagström (Note: Mårten Hagström revealed in an interview on November 30, 2025 that "Broken Cog" was first written during the Obzen sessions in 2007. It would take 15 years to properly coalesce into the song's final form, as found on Immutable.)	5:35
2.	"The Abysmal Eye"	Tomas Haake	Dick Lövgren	4:55
3.	"Light the Shortening Fuse"	Hagström	Hagström	4:28
4.	"Phantoms"	Haake	Haake; Lövgren	4:53
5.	"Ligature Marks"	Hagström	Hagström	5:13
6.	"God He Sees in Mirrors"	Haake	Lövgren	5:28
7.	"They Move Below"	(instrumental)	Hagström	9:35
8.	"Kaleidoscope"	Haake	Haake; Lövgren	4:07
9.	"Black Cathedral"	(instrumental)	Hagström	2:00
10.	"I Am That Thirst"	Haake	Hagström	4:40
11.	"The Faultless"	Haake	Hagström	4:48
12.	"Armies of the Preposterous"	Haake	Haake; Lövgren	5:15
13.	"Past Tense"	(instrumental)	Hagström	5:46
Total length:				66:43

The Indelible Edition
No.	Title	Lyrics	Music	Length
14.	"Kaleidoscope (Live)"	Haake	Haake; Lövgren	4:27
15.	"Ligature Marks (Live)"	Hagström	Hagström	5:26
16.	"God He Sees In Mirrors (Live)"	Haake	Lövgren	5:18
Total length:				81:54

== Personnel ==
=== Meshuggah ===
- Jens Kidman – vocals
- Fredrik Thordendal – lead guitar
- Mårten Hagström – rhythm guitar, backing vocals (track 11)
- Dick Lövgren – bass
- Tomas Haake – drums, spoken word (tracks 1, 11)

=== Production ===
- Rickard Bengtsson and Staffan Karlsson – mixing
- Vlado Meller – mastering
- Luminokaya – artwork

== Charts ==
Chart performance for Immutable
Chart (2022)	Peak position
Australian Albums (ARIA)	26
Austrian Albums (Ö3 Austria)	12
Belgian Albums (Ultratop Flanders)	65
Belgian Albums (Ultratop Wallonia)	45
Music Canada (MC)	6
Dutch Albums (Album Top 100)	48
Finnish Albums (Suomen virallinen lista)	6
French Albums (SNEP)	74
German Albums (Offizielle Top 100)	6
Italian Albums (FIMI)	90
Japanese Hot Albums (Billboard Japan)	98
Japanese Albums (Oricon)	106
Scottish Albums (Official Charts)	4
Spanish Albums (PROMUSICAE)	58
Swedish Albums (Sverigetopplistan)	3
Swiss Albums (Schweizer Hitparade)	6
UK Albums (Official Charts)	38
UK Independent Albums (Official Charts)	2
UK Rock & Metal Albums (Official Charts)	1
US Billboard 200	113
US Top Hard Rock Albums (Billboard)	1
