= Pitch Black (EP) =

EP by Meshuggah
- Released: 4 February 2013
- Recorded: July 2003 (track 1); 9 December 2012 (track 2)
- Venues: Distortion Festival (Eindhoven, Netherlands) (track 2)
- Studios: Fear and Loathing (Stockholm, Sweden) (track 1)
- Genres: Extreme metal; progressive metal; avant-garde metal
- Length: 15:47
- Label: Scion AV

Meshuggah chronology
| Koloss (2012) | Pitch Black (2013) | The Violent Sleep of Reason (2016) |

Pitch Black is the sixth EP by Swedish extreme metal band Meshuggah. It was released on 4 February 2013 on Scion AV. Pitch Black is available as a free download from the label's website. The song "Pitch Black" was recorded in 2003.

== Track listing ==
| No. | Title | Length |
|---|---|---|
| 1. | "Pitch Black" | 5:56 |
| 2. | "Dancers to a Discordant System" (live) | 9:51 |

== Personnel ==
- Jens Kidman – vocals (track 2)
- Fredrik Thordendal – lead guitar, bass (track 1)
- Mårten Hagström – rhythm guitar (track 2)
- Tomas Haake – drums, vocals (track 1)
- Dick Lövgren – bass (track 2)
