= ObZen =

obZen
- Cover art by Joachim Luetke

Studio album by Meshuggah
- Released: 7 March 2008
- Recorded: March–October 2007
- Genres: Extreme metal; progressive metal; technical death metal; djent
- Length: 52:22
- Label: Nuclear Blast
- Producer: Meshuggah

Meshuggah chronology
Catch Thirtythree (2005)	obZen (2008)	Koloss (2012)

Alternative cover
- Censored version

obZen is the sixth studio album by Swedish extreme metal band Meshuggah. It was released in Europe on 7 March 2008, and in North America on 11 March 2008 by Nuclear Blast. Tomas Haake made his return as a studio drummer for the record after the Drumkit From Hell drum software was used on Catch Thirtythree.

== Background ==
In an interview with Revolver, drummer Tomas Haake stated that obZen would be a collective return to the band's past works, signalling a shift in direction away from their previous effort, Catch Thirtythree. "We've got some fast, intense songs and hectic, heavy stuff that draws from all the things we've done in the past."

The album was originally planned for release in November 2007, prior to a European tour featuring Meshuggah and The Dillinger Escape Plan. The recording process for obZen took longer than expected and led the band to drop out of the tour, later explaining on their official website that the "album-promotional" aspect of the touring no longer applied and that they would rather focus their priorities on getting the record finished.

== Production ==
In an interview, Haake commented further on the time taken to record the album, saying, "This time around we took almost six months to do all the recording and the sampling [...] we definitely took our time". Drumkit from Hell was used on the album, but not programmed as Catch Thirtythree was. Drumkit from Hell was an auxiliary sound source. He elaborated on the concept of the album in another interview, saying: "If you haven't figured it out yet, obZen means that mankind has found its 'zen' in the obscure and obscene."

The track that became “Bleed” was originally a project that guitarist Thordendal was working on for a video game soundtrack. Thordendal had at that point "probably two hours, at least" of material, according to Haake. Upon hearing the unfinished project, the other bandmembers were impressed and convinced Thordendal to keep the song for the album.

Haake also mentioned his favorite track on this album is "Dancers to a Discordant System". Meshuggah performed the song live for the first time at the opening show of the Koloss tour in Bristol, England, on 12 April 2012. It was performed as the closing song for every show on the tour since then.

It is also the first album on which bassist Dick Lovgren performs despite having been a member of the band since 2004; this is due to the bass having been recorded by Jens Kidman, Fredrik Thordendal, and Mårten Hagstrom on Catch Thirtythree, and the bass having been performed by guitarist Fredrik Thordendal on the previous I EP.

== Releases ==
The release of the album was followed by their first world tour.

The song "Bleed" was released as DLC for the Rock Band video games via the Rock Band Network on 18 June 2010. A music video was filmed for a shorter version of the song "Bleed".

A two-disc vinyl re-issue was released on 22 March 2019 through Nuclear Blast. A remastered version was released 31 March 2023 for the 15th anniversary through Atomic Fire.

== Album art ==
Although Meshuggah had not done so in the past, the album art of obZen was outsourced. With a vision of what they wanted the artwork to be, Meshuggah made use of cross-media artist Joachim Luetke. In an interview with Nuclear Blast USA, Haake and Hagström explain that the artwork features a photograph of a male model in the "zen lotus position" with the bottom half of the photograph being from a female model. This is because the male model could not perform the position, making the figure androgynous. The model is covered in blood, which is explained as a metaphor for mankind finding peace of mind through obscenity. Additionally, each of the three blood-smeared hands poses in the shape of the number six, which is meant to symbolize the inherently evil nature of man.

== Reception ==
Professional ratings
Aggregate scores
Source	Rating
Metacritic	83/100
Review scores
Source	Rating
Allmusic	4/5 stars
Alternative Press	4/5 stars
The Aquarian	A+
The A.V. Club	A
Blabbermouth.net	9/10 stars
Exclaim!	favorable
IGN	7/10 stars
Pitchfork	8.8/10
Rock Hard	9/10 stars
Sputnikmusic	4.5/5 stars

obZen was acclaimed by critics and fans alike. On Metacritic, it has a score of 83 out of 100 based on 6 reviews, indicating "universal acclaim".

The album was praised for its consistency, and the band for their continued musical evolution, with Nick Terry from Decibel saying, "Three years on, and we have a new reference point to chart Meshuggah's musical evolution. And yeah, things are evolving nicely".

The album was also praised for the band revisiting their early thrash metal-oriented approach on tracks like "Combustion" and "Bleed", while still maintaining the experimentalism found on their last few albums. John Norby from Zero Tolerance Magazine described it as "The best of modern-Meshuggah meets the best of older-Meshuggah."

Thom Jurek, in his review of the album on Allmusic, called obZen "sheer attack metal, played by a band that has run from simplicity to excess and incorporated them both into a record that is on a level with anything else they've done, even if not all the elements marry perfectly yet".

Magazines such as Terrorizer, Decibel, Revolver and Metal Hammer named the album in their 2008 year's end list. Meshuggah was nominated for a Swedish Grammy for obZen in the category of Hard Rock, but lost to In Flames.

In 2023, Rolling Stone ranked the album's third track, "Bleed", number forty-one on their list of 100 greatest heavy metal songs.

== Track listing ==
Vinyl releases have tracks 1–3 on side A, tracks 4–6 on side B, tracks 7–8 on side C and track 9 on side D.

All lyrics are written by Tomas Haake.

No.	Title	Music	Length
1.	"Combustion"	Thordendal	4:08
2.	"Electric Red"	Hagström, Haake	5:51
3.	"Bleed"	Thordendal	7:22
4.	"Lethargica"	Hagström	5:47
5.	"obZen"	Hagström	4:24
6.	"This Spiteful Snake"	Hagström, Haake	4:52
7.	"Pineal Gland Optics"	Thordendal	5:12
8.	"Pravus"	Hagström	5:10
9.	"Dancers to a Discordant System"	Thordendal	9:36
Total length:			52:22

== Personnel ==
Credits adapted from Allmusic.

=== Meshuggah ===
- Jens Kidman – vocals
- Fredrik Thordendal – lead guitar, rhythm guitar (tracks 2, 8)
- Mårten Hagström – rhythm guitar, lead guitar (tracks 2, 8)
- Dick Lövgren – bass
- Tomas Haake – drums, spoken word (track 9)

=== Production ===
- Meshuggah – production
- Björn Engelmann – mastering
- Joachim Luetke – cover art, photography

== Chart positions ==
obZen debuted at number 59 in the United States, with first week sales of 11,384 copies. In Sweden, the album entered the official album chart at number 16, and in the United Kingdom at number 151. By 19 September 2008 obZen had sold over 50,000 copies in the U.S., and 82,000 copies by 2012.

Chart (2008)	Peak position
Finnish Albums (Suomen virallinen lista)	21
French Albums (SNEP)	123
Japanese Albums (Oricon)	88
Swedish Albums (Sverigetopplistan)	16
Swiss Albums (Schweizer Hitparade)	99
UK Albums (OCC)	151
US Billboard 200	59
