= Dick Lövgren =

Swedish bass guitarist

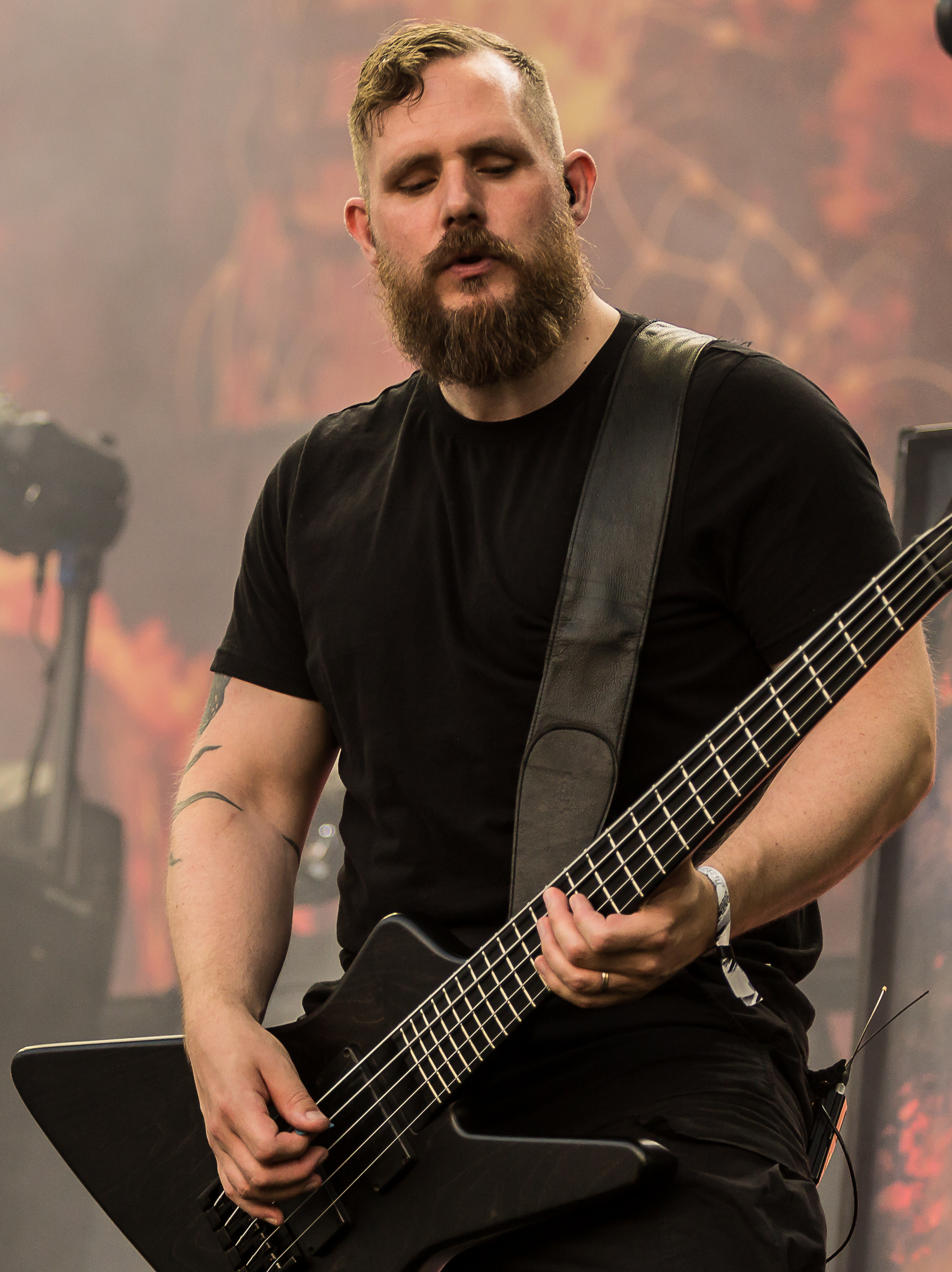
- Lövgren performing with Meshuggah in 2023

Background information
- Born: 11 November 1980 (age 45); Varberg, Sweden
- Genres: Heavy metal, extreme metal, experimental metal, alternative metal, progressive metal
- Occupation: Musician
- Instrument: Bass guitar

Dick August Lövgren (born 11 November 1980) is a Swedish musician. He is the bass guitarist for extreme metal band Meshuggah, which he joined in 2004.

== Biography ==
In his early days, Lövgren was particularly impressed with the Metallica bass guitarist Cliff Burton. He said that Burton "was probably the main reason why I became a bassist". Lövgren is a schooled jazz musician, influenced by Dave Holland, John Scofield, Medeski Martin & Wood, Miles Davis and Brad Mehldau. He always preferred playing with fingers; however, in his main band, Meshuggah, he plays with a pick exclusively, stating that the exact sound from the pick and distortion is strictly what Meshuggah wants to extract from the bass guitar.

Before joining Meshuggah, Lövgren performed with a vast array of bands in his native Sweden, first with the neo-classical metal/melodic power metal band Time Requiem, then the melodic/progressive metal band Last Tribe, the death metal band Cromlech and the power metal band Armageddon (alongside Arch Enemy guitarist Christopher Amott). In the late 1990s, Lövgren held the enviable assignment of touring bass guitarist for both Arch Enemy and In Flames.

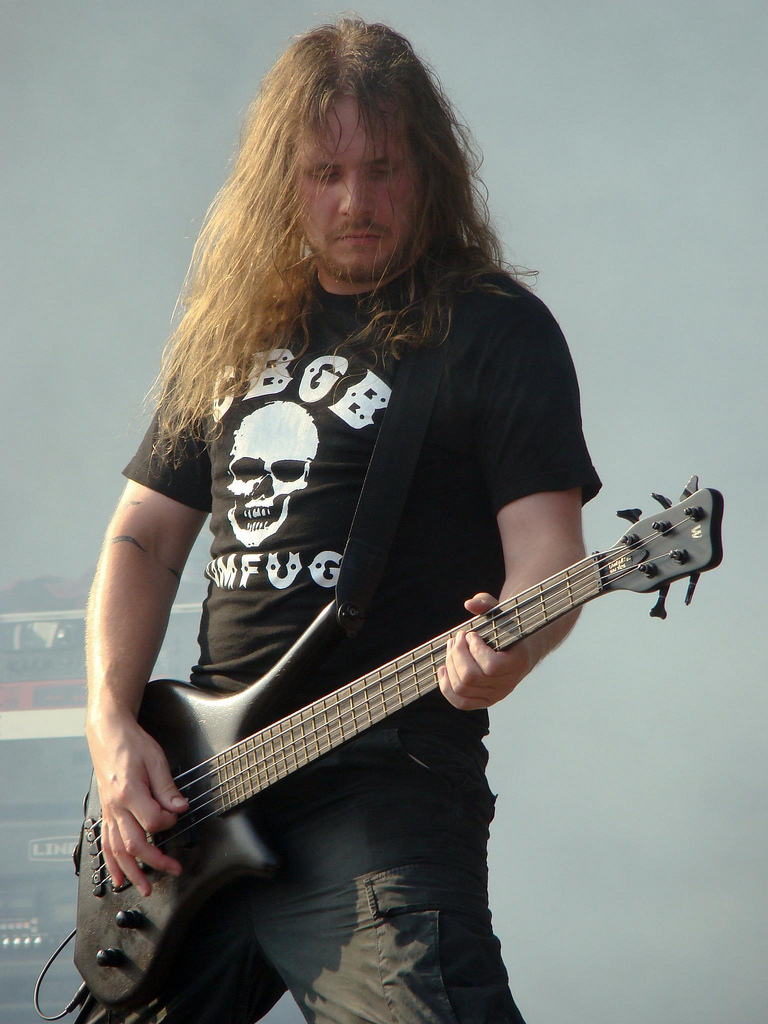
Lövgren in 2008

Lövgren joined Meshuggah in 2004 after the band lost their bass guitarist, Gustaf Hielm, in 2001. In the same year, they released their EP I, that contains just one track of the same name, that lasts twenty-one minutes. However, Lövgren did not play in Meshuggah's recording sessions until their highly successful album, obZen (2008). This was due to the album finish deadline while recording Catch Thirtythree, so the drum and bass tracks were recorded digitally. He also released a highly acclaimed fusion-jazz album, Lounge, with the Swedish Nica Group ensemble. All tracks were composed by Lövgren, and the album shows his creativity as well as jazz-styled playing skills.

In September 2010, Lövgren was accepted into the Gothenburg Music University to study improvisation and composition with Anders Jormin, the Swedish jazz double bass player, arranger and bandleader who has worked with numerous jazz artists, such as Bobo Stenson, Charles Lloyd, Tomasz Stańko, Don Cherry, Elvin Jones, Gilberto Gil, Lee Konitz, Joe Henderson, Kenny Wheeler and Jon Balke. He said that it was a huge honor and a great opportunity, emphasizing that it would not jeopardize anything with Meshuggah. "I will be able to do the tours and come back to classes. But this does mean that I will be playing and writing a lot of jazz in the next few years between Meshuggah tours."

== Discography ==
- Nica Group — Lounge (2002)
- Time Requiem — Time Requiem (2002)
- Meshuggah — obZen (2008)
- Meshuggah — Alive (2010)
- Meshuggah — Koloss (2012)
- Meshuggah — The Violent Sleep of Reason (2016)
- Meshuggah — Immutable (2022)
