= Tomas Haake =

Swedish drummer (born 1971)

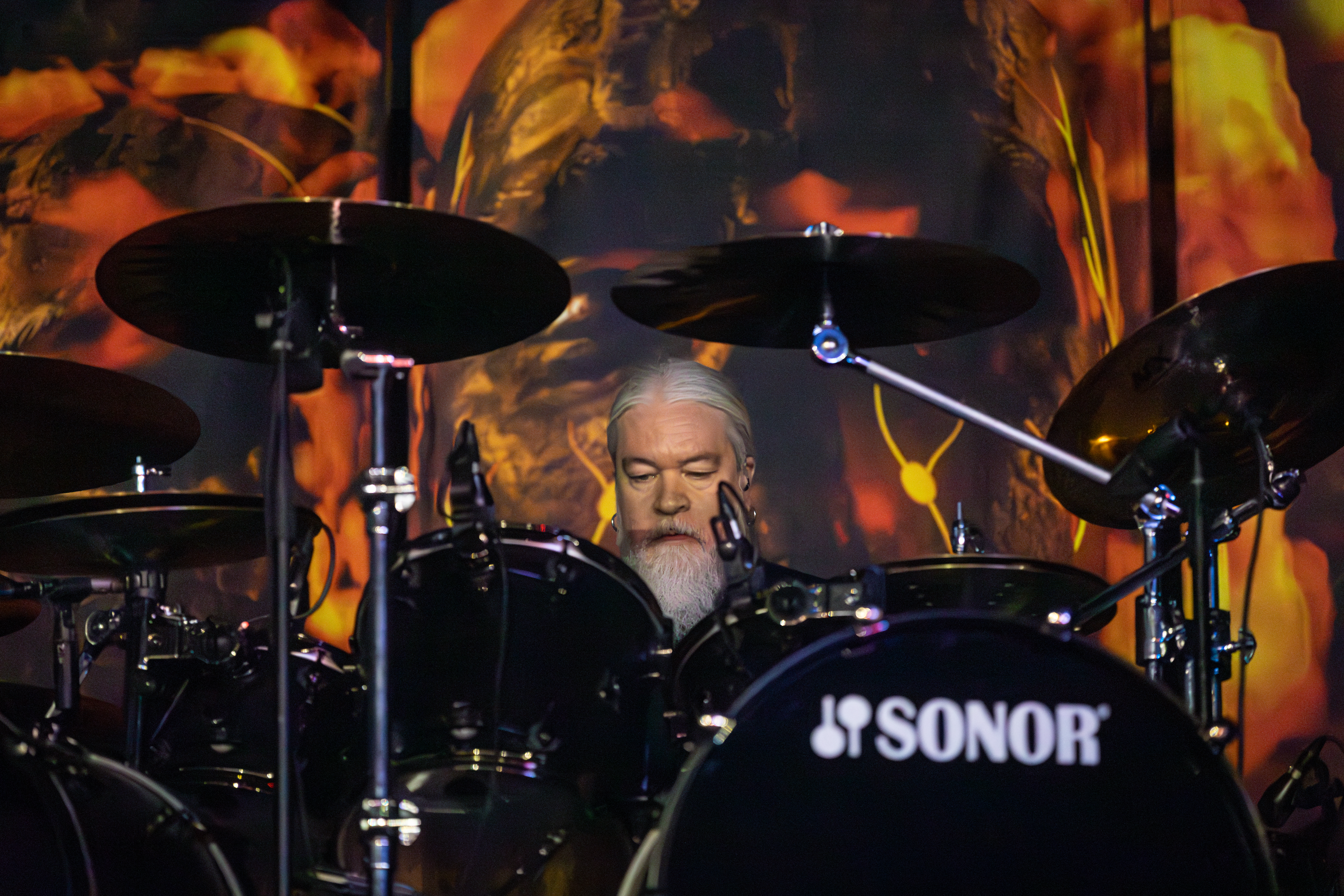
- Haake in 2023

Background information
- Born: 13 July 1971 (age 55); Örnsköldsvik, Sweden
- Genres: Progressive metal, extreme metal, djent, avant-garde metal, groove metal, thrash metal
- Occupation: Drummer
- Years active: 1987–present
- Label: Nuclear Blast

Tomas Nils Haake (born 13 July 1971) is a Swedish musician known for being the drummer and primary lyricist of the extreme metal band Meshuggah.

Known for his polymeters and technical ability, Haake was named the fifth best "Modern Metal" drummer by MetalSucks.net in 2012. In the July 2008 edition of Modern Drummer magazine, Haake was named the number one drummer in the "Metal" category, as decided upon in the magazine's Readers' Poll. He was also included in 100 Greatest Drummers of All Time list by the Rolling Stone magazine (occupying the 93rd position).

== Career ==
Haake writes the majority of Meshuggah lyrics and also contributes spoken vocals on several songs ("Choirs of Devastation" on the album Contradictions Collapse, "Inside What's Within Behind", "Suffer in Truth", and "Sublevels" on the album Destroy Erase Improve, "Sane", "The Exquisite Machinery of Torture" on the album Chaosphere, "Closed Eye Visuals", "Spasm", and "Nebulous" on the album Nothing, as well as on several tracks on the album Catch Thirtythree, "Dancers to a Discordant System" from obZen, and "The Faultless" from Immutable).

Haake also provides spoken vocals on Meshuggah guitarist Fredrik Thordendal's solo album Sol Niger Within and vocals on the song "Futile Bread Machine (Campfire Version)" from The True Human Design.

== Influences ==
Haake has cited musicians from heavy metal, jazz fusion and progressive rock as influences. He cites English bands such as Iron Maiden and Black Sabbath, American bands such as Metallica, Slayer, Megadeth, Anthrax, Testament and Metal Church, and Canadian band Rush. His favourite drummers include Phil Rudd (AC/DC), Bill Ward (Black Sabbath), Vinnie Appice, Lars Ulrich (Metallica), Dave Weckl, Sebastian Thomson (Trans AM), Sean Reinert (Cynic), Neil Peart (Rush), Ian Mosley (Marillion), Terry Bozzio (Missing Persons and Frank Zappa), Vinnie Colaiuta and Gary Husband.

== Personal life ==
Haake is married to actress/musician Jessica Pimentel, beginning their romantic relationship in 2013.

== Equipment ==
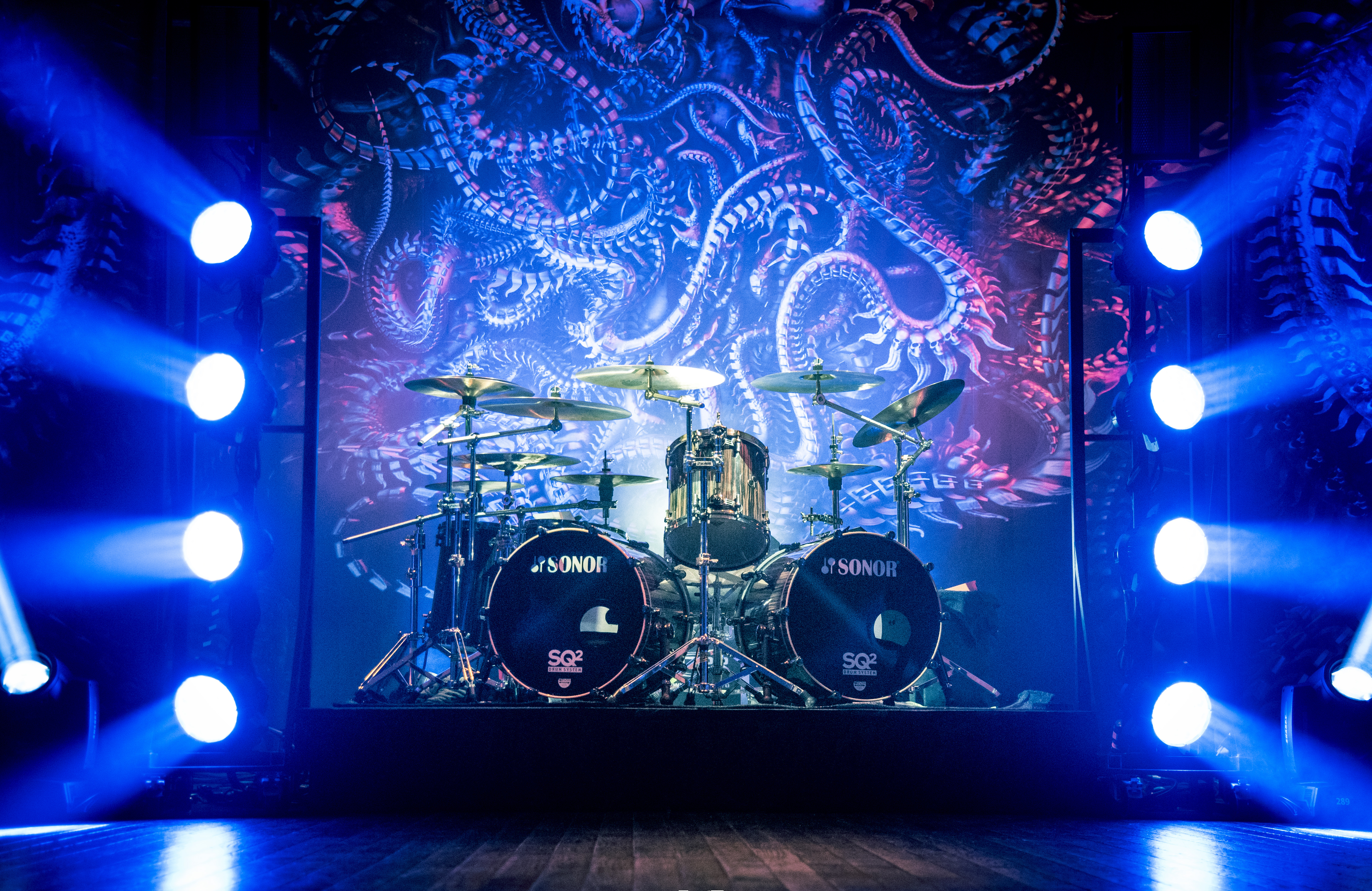
Haake's 2016 drumkit

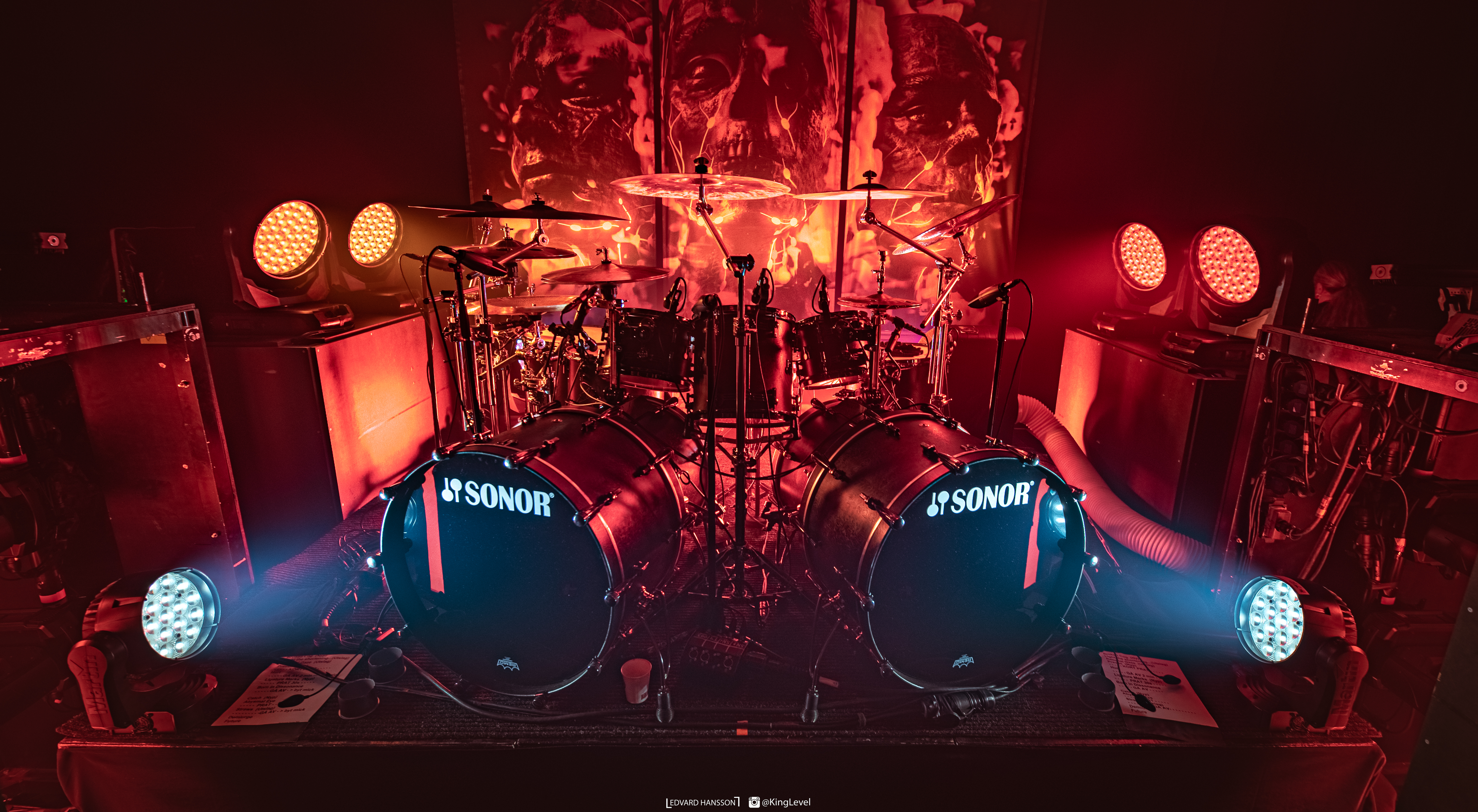
Haake's 2022 drumkit

- Drums – Sonor SQ2 Series
  - 14x14" Tom
  - 16x15" Floor Tom
  - 18x18" Floor Tom
  - 22x18" Bass Drum (2x)
  - 14x6" Sonor Artists Bronze Series Snare with Tama Power Hoops
- Cymbals – Sabian
  - 14" HHX Compression Hi-Hats
  - 19" AAXtreme Chinese
  - 19" HHX Stage Crash
  - 21" HHX Stage Crash
  - 20" HHX Stage Crash
  - 19" Paragon Chinese/15" HH thin Crash (stacked)
  - 15" HHX Stage Hats
  - 22" Legacy Ride (as crash)
  - 21" AAXtreme Chinese
- Drum heads – Remo
  - Toms: (12", 14", 15", 18") Coated Emperors, Ebony Ambassadors – bottom
  - Bass drums: (22") Powerstroke 3 Coated – batter, PowerStroke 3 Ebony – front
  - Snare: (14") Emperor X – top, Snare Side Hazy – bottom
- Hardware – Sonor, Pearl, Porter & Davies
  - Tama Speed Cobra single Pedal (2x)
  - Porter & Davies BC2 w/backrest
- Sticks – Wincent Tomas Haake Signature Drumsticks

== Discography ==
Meshuggah

- Contradictions Collapse (1991)
- None (EP, 1994)
- Selfcaged (EP, 1995)
- Destroy Erase Improve (1995)
- Chaosphere (1998)
- Nothing (2002)
- I (EP, 2004)
- Catch Thirtythree (2005)
- Nothing – Re-issue (2006)
- obZen (2008)
- Koloss (2012)
- Pitch Black (EP, 2013)
- The Violent Sleep of Reason (2016)
- Immutable (2022)
