= Contradictions Collapse =

Studio album by Meshuggah
- Released: 1991
- Studios: Umeå, Sweden
- Genres: Thrash metal; progressive metal
- Length: 56:19
- Label: Nuclear Blast

Meshuggah chronology
Meshuggah (1989)	Contradictions Collapse (1991)	None (1994)

Contradictions Collapse is the debut studio album by Swedish extreme metal band Meshuggah.

== Release history ==
A promotional cassette of the album was titled (All This Because of) Greed and included Qualms of Reality and We'll Never See the Day.

Four tracks from the None EP were included as bonus tracks on the 1999 reissue, in addition to the 2008 reissue, which was released by Nuclear Blast in 2008 as the Reloaded edition.

== Music ==
The album leans more towards a thrash metal sound than the band's later works, featuring "heavy riffs", as well as "industrial dance in the drum patterns." It is the only album to feature Jens Kidman on rhythm guitar, as well as Fredrik Thordendal on lead vocals in some tracks.

== Reception ==
Professional ratings
Review scores
Source	Rating
Collector's Guide to Heavy Metal	8/10
The Encyclopedia of Popular Music	3/5 stars
Pitchfork	5.2/10

AllMusic critic Steve Huey wrote: "Although it's not quite as accomplished as their later work, it's certainly a worthwhile listen, especially for devoted fans."

== Track listing ==
No.	Title	Lyrics	Music	Lead vocals	Length
1.	"Paralyzing Ignorance"	Jens Kidman	Kidman, Fredrik Thordendal	Kidman	4:27
2.	"Erroneous Manipulation"	Kidman, Thordendal	Thordendal, Johan Sjögren	Thordendal	6:20
3.	"Abnegating Cecity"	Tomas Haake	Kidman, Thordendal, Haake	Thordendal	6:28
4.	"Internal Evidence"	Kidman	Kidman, Thordendal	Kidman	7:26
5.	"Qualms of Reality"	Haake	Kidman, Thordendal	Thordendal	7:02
6.	"We'll Never See the Day"	Kidman	Kidman, Niklas Lundgren	Kidman	6:02
7.	"Greed"	Kidman, Thordendal	Kidman, Thordendal	Thordendal	7:05
8.	"Choirs of Devastation"	Haake, Thordendal	Haake, Thordendal	Haake	3:59
9.	"Cadaverous Mastication"	Kidman, Thordendal	Kidman, Thordendal, Lundgren	Kidman	7:29
Total length:					56:19

"Choirs of Devastation" (1991)
"Choirs of Devastation"

=== 1999 reissue ===
No.	Title	Length
10.	"Humiliative"	5:17
11.	"Sickening"	5:46
12.	"Ritual"	6:16
13.	"Gods of Rapture"	5:09
Total length:		78:48

== Personnel ==
=== Meshuggah ===
- Jens Kidman − rhythm guitar, backing vocals, lead vocals (tracks 1, 4, 6, and 9)
- Fredrik Thordendal − lead guitar, backing vocals, lead vocals (tracks 2, 3, 5, and 7), sitar (track 6)
- Peter Nordin − bass guitar, backing vocals (track 3)
- Tomas Haake − drums, backing vocals, lead vocals (track 8)

=== On 1999 reissue bonus tracks ===
- Jens Kidman − lead vocals
- Fredrik Thordendal − lead guitar, backing vocals
- Peter Nordin − bass guitar, backing vocals
- Tomas Haake − drums, backing vocals
- Mårten Hagström – rhythm guitar, backing vocals
