= Catch Thirtythree =

Studio album by Meshuggah
- Released: 16 May 2005
- Recorded: 2004–2005
- Studios: Fear and Loathing Studios, Stockholm, Sweden
- Genres: Avant-garde metal; progressive metal; groove metal
- Length: 47:18
- Label: Nuclear Blast
- Producer: Meshuggah

Meshuggah chronology
I (2004)	Catch Thirtythree (2005)	obZen (2008)

Professional ratings
Review scores
Source	Rating
AllMusic	2.5/5 stars
Alternative Press	5/5 stars
Blabbermouth.net	8.5/10
Blender	3/5 stars
Collector's Guide to Heavy Metal	8/10
Kerrang!	3/5 stars
PopMatters	5/10
Pitchfork	7.2/10

Catch Thirtythree (stylized as Catch ThirtythrԐԐ) is the fifth studio album by Swedish extreme metal band Meshuggah. It was released on 16 May 2005 in Europe and on 31 May 2005 in North America, through Nuclear Blast. Catch Thirtythree entered the Billboard 200 chart at number 170. The album is a single song, a continuous suite, with 13 movements. It exclusively used drum programming, leveraging Toontrack's EZdrummer software synthesizer with the "Drumkit from Hell" Expansion, instead of traditional acoustic drums.

== Track listing ==
All music is written by Meshuggah (Fredrik Thordendal, Jens Kidman, Mårten Hagström, Tomas Haake), and all lyrics are written by Haake and Hagström.

No.	Title	Length
1.	"Autonomy Lost"	1:41
2.	"Imprint of the Un-Saved"	1:36
3.	"Disenchantment"	1:44
4.	"The Paradoxical Spiral"	3:13
5.	"Re-Inanimate"	1:04
6.	"Entrapment"	2:29
7.	"Mind's Mirrors"	4:30
8.	"In Death - Is Life"	2:02
9.	"In Death - Is Death"	13:22
10.	"Shed"	3:35
11.	"Personae Non Gratae"	1:47
12.	"Dehumanization"	2:57
13.	"Sum"	7:17
Total length:		47:18

== Personnel ==
All credits are adapted from the album's liner notes.

- Jens Kidman – lead vocals, guitar, bass, drum programming, mixing
- Fredrik Thordendal – guitar, bass, drum programming, mixing
- Mårten Hagström – lyrics, guitar, bass, drum programming, mixing
- Tomas Haake – lyrics, spoken vocals, drum programming, mixing, artwork and artwork concept
- Björn Engelmann – mastering (Cutting Room Studios)

== Charts ==
Chart (2005)	Peak position
French Albums (SNEP)	124
Swedish Albums (Sverigetopplistan)	12
UK Rock & Metal Albums (Official Charts)	32
US Billboard 200	170
US Heatseekers Albums (Billboard)	7
