= The True Human Design =

EP by Meshuggah
- Released: 19 July 1997
- Genre: Groove metal; progressive metal; avant-garde metal
- Length: 35:56
- Label: Nuclear Blast

Meshuggah chronology
Destroy Erase Improve (1995)	The True Human Design (1997)	Chaosphere (1998)

The True Human Design is the fourth EP by Swedish extreme metal band Meshuggah. It was released through Nuclear Blast on 19 July 1997 in Europe and on 25 November 1997 in the United States. The EP includes an enhanced CD-ROM video track for the song "Terminal Illusions". All of the songs, except for the live recording of "Future Breed Machine", were featured on the "Reloaded" re-release of Chaosphere.

== Track listing ==
No.	Title	Length
1.	"Sane" (demo)	4:07
2.	"Future Breed Machine" (live)	5:48
3.	"Future Breed Machine" (Mayhem version)	8:12
4.	"Futile Bread Machine" (Campfire version)	3:30
5.	"Future Breed Machine" (Quant's Quantastical Quantasm)	7:31
6.	"Future Breed Machine" (Friend's Breaking and Entering)	6:48
Total length:		35:56

== Personnel ==
- Jens Kidman – vocals
- Fredrik Thordendal – lead guitar, bass, background vocals
- Mårten Hagström – rhythm guitar, background vocals
- Tomas Haake – drums, vocals on "Futile Bread Machine", spoken vocals on "Sane" (demo)
- Gustaf Hielm – bass on "Future Breed Machine" (live)

=== Engineering ===
- Jocke Skog – remix (track 3)
- Jonas Quant – remix (track 5)
