= Rare Trax =

Compilation album by Meshuggah
- Released: 21 August 2001
- Recorded: 1989–2001
- Genre: Groove metal; progressive metal; avant-garde metal
- Length: 54:44
- Label: Nuclear Blast

Meshuggah chronology
Chaosphere (1998)	Rare Trax (2001)	Nothing (2002)

Professional ratings
Review scores
Source	Rating
AllMusic	2/5 stars
Collector's Guide to Heavy Metal	8/10

Rare Trax is the first compilation album by Swedish extreme metal band Meshuggah. It was released on 21 August 2001 by Nuclear Blast. It compiles the three songs from the band's first 1989 release, Meshuggah, along with other rare songs that the band had recorded but never released.

The CD-ROM also contains the music video for the song "New Millennium Cyanide Christ" from Chaosphere, which features the band on a tour bus, air-playing all the instruments (with Jens Kidman yelling into a pen) and headbanging in unison.

"War" was the first Meshuggah song to feature programmed drums, it was recorded as a birthday present for lead guitarist Fredrik Thordendal. The remix for the song "Concatenation" is a slower version of the song with a different drum beat. The person on the cover and inlay photographs is tour manager Per Wikström.

== Track listing ==
No.	Title	Length
1.	"War"	2:48
2.	"Cadaverous Mastication"	7:49
3.	"Sovereigns Morbidity"	4:28
4.	"Debt of Nature"	7:18
5.	"By Emptiness Abducted"	4:49
6.	"Don't Speak"	3:26
7.	"Abnegating Cecity" (Demo version '90)	6:22
8.	"Internal Evidence" (Demo version '90)	6:59
9.	"Concatenation" (Remix)	6:15
10.	"Ayahuasca Experience"	4:30
Total length:		54:44

== Personnel ==
=== Meshuggah ===
- Jens Kidman − lead vocals (tracks 1–3, 5–6, 8–9), backing vocals (tracks 4, 7), rhythm guitar (tracks 2–4, 7–8)
- Fredrik Thordendal − lead guitar (tracks 2–9), lead vocals (tracks 4, 7), backing vocals (tracks 2–3, 8), bass (track 9)
- Mårten Hagström − rhythm guitar (tracks 5–6, 9), lead guitar (track 1), bass (track 1)
- Tomas Haake − drums (tracks 5–9), programmed drums (track 1), backing vocals (tracks 7–8)

=== Additional personnel ===
- Bård Torstensen − rhythm guitar (track 1)
- Niklas Lundgren − drums (tracks 2–4), backing vocals (tracks 2–4)
- Peter Nordin − bass (tracks 2–5, 7–8), backing vocals (tracks 2–4, 7–8)
- Gustaf Hielm − bass (track 6)
