= The Ophidian Trek =

Video by Meshuggah
- Released: 29 September 2014
- Genre: Extreme metal, progressive metal, experimental metal
- Length: 43:42 (CD 1); 46:21 (CD 2)
- Label: Nuclear Blast

Meshuggah chronology
Alive (2010)	The Ophidian Trek (2014)

The Ophidian Trek is the second live album by Swedish extreme metal band Meshuggah and directed by Anthony Dubois. Recordings were compiled from various locations in Europe and the US in 2013 and Wacken Open Air 2013.

== Track listing ==
=== DVD/Blu-Ray ===
1. "Swarmer"
2. "Swarm"
3. "Combustion" (Wacken)
4. "Rational Gaze" (Wacken)
5. "obZen"
6. "Lethargica"
7. "Do Not Look Down" (Wacken)
8. "The Hurt That Finds You First"
9. "I Am Colossus"
10. "Bleed"
11. "Demiurge" (Wacken)
12. "New Millennium Cyanide Christ" (Wacken)
13. "Dancers to a Discordant System"
14. "Mind’s Mirrors / In Death – Is Life / In Death – Is Death"
15. "The Last Vigil"

=== CD 1 ===
No.	Title	Length
1.	"Swarmer"	1:58
2.	"Swarm"	5:22
3.	"Combustion"	4:21
4.	"Rational Gaze"	5:04
5.	"obZen"	5:21
6.	"Lethargica"	6:04
7.	"Do Not Look Down"	4:57
8.	"The Hurt That Finds You First"	5:46
9.	"I Am Colossus"	4:49
Total length:		43:42

=== CD 2 ===
No.	Title	Length
1.	"Bleed"	7:21
2.	"Demiurge"	5:18
3.	"New Millennium Cyanide Christ"	5:08
4.	"Dancers to a Discordant System"	10:14
5.	"Mind’s Mirrors/In Death – Is Life/In Death – Is Death"	14:11
6.	"The Last Vigil"	4:09
Total length:		46:21

== Personnel ==
- Jens Kidman – vocals
- Fredrik Thordendal – lead guitar
- Mårten Hagström – rhythm guitar
- Tomas Haake – drums
- Dick Lövgren – bass

== Charts ==
Chart performance for ALBUM NAME
Chart (2022)	Peak position
US Top Hard Rock Albums (Billboard)	21
