= Sol Niger Within =

Studio album by Fredrik Thordendal's Special Defects
- Released: 1997
- Genre: Extreme metal, avant garde metal
- Length: 43:26
- Label: Ultimate Audio; Relapse
- Producer: Fredrik Thordendal

Professional ratings
Review scores
Source	Rating
AllMusic	3/5 stars

Sol Niger Within is the first release by Fredrik Thordendal's Special Defects, a side project of Meshuggah guitarist Fredrik Thordendal. The album was originally released in 1997 on the Ultimate Audio Entertainment label.

The album was remixed and re-released by Ultimate Audio Entertainment and Relapse Records in 1999 under the title "Sol Niger Within version 3.33". The re-release contains two bonus tracks but omits several parts of the original version.

The album is a combination of complex jazz fusion elements influenced directly by guitarist Allan Holdsworth's unique guitar style and overall musical approach. The disc comprises one long song, which is indexed into 29 tracks. The length of each section ranges from around 20 seconds to 2–3 minutes. The album contains several references to the work of Meshuggah. The last track, "Tathagata", is very similar in melody to the ending of the song "Sublevels" from Destroy Erase Improve.

The album features drums by Morgan Ågren and keyboards by Mats Öberg, members of the Swedish Mats/Morgan Band.

== Track listing ==
=== Original 1997 release ===
Antanca – The End (The Uncompounded Reality)

1. "The Beginning of the End of Extraction (Evolutional Slow Down)" – 1:36
2. "The Executive Furies of the Robot Lord of Death" – 1:28
3. "Descent to the Netherworld" – 0:30
4. "...Och Stjärnans Namn Var Malört" – 1:54
5. "Dante's Wild Inferno" – 0:59
6. "I, Galactus" – 1:29
7. "Skeletonization" – 0:15
8. "Sickness and Demoniacal Dreaming" – 1:06
9. "UFOria" – 0:37
10. "Z1- Reticuli" – 2:52
11. "Transmigration of Souls" – 1:28
12. "In Reality All Is Void" – 0:30
13. "Krapp's Last Tape" – 1:16
14. "Through Fear We Are Unconscious" – 0:59
15. "Death at Both Ends" – 0:59
16. "Bouncing in a Bottomless Pit" – 1:14
17. "The Sun Door" – 1:32
18. "Painful Disruption" – 0:29
19. "Vitamin K Experience (A Homage to The Scientist/John Lilly)" – 0:57
20. "Cosmic Vagina Dentata Organ" – 4:43
21. "Sensorium Dei" – 3:42
22. "Magickal Theatre .33." – 1:50
23. "Z2- Reticuli" – 2:52
24. "De Profundis" – 0:30
25. "Existence Out of Joint" – 1:14
26. "On a Crater's Verge" – 1:14
27. "Solarization" – 1:50
28. "The End of the Beginning of Contraction (Involutional Speed Up/Preparation for the Big Crunch)" – 0:16
29. "Tathagata" – 3:03

=== 3.33 release ===
1. "The Beginning of the End of Extraction (Evolutional Slow Down)" – 1:36
2. "The Executive Furies of the Robot Lord of Death" – 1:28
3. "Descent to the Netherworld" – 0:30
4. "...Och Stjärnans Namn Var Malört" – 1:54
5. "Dante's Wild Inferno" – 0:59
6. "I, Galactus" – 1:29
7. "Skeletonization" – 0:15
8. "Sickness and Demoniacal Dreaming" – 1:06
9. "UFOria" – 1:06
10. "Z1- Reticuli" – 2:52
11. "Transmigration of Souls" – 1:28
12. "In Reality All Is Void" – 0:30
13. "Krapp's Last Tape" – 1:16
14. "Through Fear We Are Unconscious" – 0:59
15. "Death at Both Ends" – 0:59
16. "Bouncing in a Bottomless Pit" – 1:14
17. "The Sun Door" – 1:32
18. "Vitamin K Experience (A Homage to The Scientist/John Lilly)" – 0:57
19. "Sensorium Dei" – 3:42
20. "Z2- Reticuli" – 2:52
21. "De Profundis" – 0:30
22. "Existence Out of Joint" – 1:14
23. "On a Crater's Verge" – 1:14
24. "Solarization" – 1:50
25. "The End of the Beginning of Contraction (Involutional Speed Up/Preparation for the Big Crunch)" – 0:16
26. "Tathagata" – 3:03
27. "Missing Time" – 11:16
28. "Ooo Baby Baby" – 1:15

== Personnel ==
- Fredrik Thordendal - guitars, bass guitar, lead vocals, and programming
- Morgan Ågren - drums
- Mats Öberg - church organ, synthesizer (parts 2, 20)
- Jonas Knutsson - saxophone (parts 20, 23, 27, 28)
- Jerry Ericsson - bass guitar (parts 10, 23)
- Kantor Magnus Larsson - church organ (part 22)
- Victor Alneng - yidaki (part 14)
- Marcus Persson - additional vocals
- Tomas Haake - spoken vocals
- Jennie Thordendal - additional screamed vocals
- Petter Marklund - additional lyric contributions

== Trivia ==
- The track "Magickal Theatre .33." features an arrangement of Léon Boëllmann's Suite Gothique, Op. 25: Introduction - Choral (C minor).
