= None (Meshuggah EP) =

EP by Meshuggah
- Released: 8 November 1994
- Recorded: Tonteknik Recording, Umeå, Sweden
- Genre: Thrash metal; progressive metal
- Length: 33:14
- Label: Nuclear Blast

Meshuggah chronology
Contradictions Collapse (1991)	None (1994)	Selfcaged (1995)

Professional ratings
Review scores
Source	Rating
AllMusic	3.5/5 stars
Collector's Guide to Heavy Metal	9/10
Pitchfork	6.0/10

None is the second EP by Swedish extreme metal band Meshuggah. It was released on 8 November 1994 via Nuclear Blast. The band started embracing a more complex approach that would lay the grounds for their later style. The EP has been reissued by Nuclear Blast in November 2018, the first four tracks are also available on the Contradictions Collapse reissue while the fifth track is on the Destroy Erase Improve reissue. This is the band's first release to feature rhythm guitarist Mårten Hagström.

== Track listing ==
Vinyl releases have tracks 1–3 on side A, and tracks 4–5 on side B

All lyrics are written by Tomas Haake, except 'Ritual' by Jens Kidman.

No.	Title	Writer(s)	Length
1.	"Humiliative"	Jens Kidman, Fredrik Thordendal	5:17
2.	"Sickening"	Thordendal, Mårten Hagström	5:46
3.	"Ritual"	Kidman	6:17
4.	"Gods of Rapture"	Thordendal	5:10
5.	"Aztec Two-Step (song ends at minute 5:40. After 5 minutes of silence [5:40 - 10:40], begins a brief hidden track.)"	Meshuggah	10:44
Total length:			33:14

== Personnel ==
- Jens Kidman – vocals
- Tomas Haake – drums, backing vocals
- Peter Nordin – bass, backing vocals
- Fredrik Thordendal – lead guitar, rhythm guitar, backing vocals
- Mårten Hagström – rhythm guitar, backing vocals
