= Line 6 Flextone =

The Line 6 Flextone was the first in a series of guitar amplifiers to package Line 6's POD digital modeling system in a stand-alone amplifier product. Digital modeling allowed users to access guitar tones based on those of many popular vintage and boutique amplifiers. At the time of its release in the late 1990s, the Flextone series was a more affordable alternative to the company's flagship Vetta amplifier.

== Flextone Product Line ==
The original flextone product line consisted of five models:

- Flextone 1x12- A 60 watt amplifier with one 12" speaker.
- Flextone Duo- A 100 watt stereo amplifier with two 10" speakers.
- Flextone Plus- A 60 watt amplifier with one 12" speaker and a connection for stereo operation via 1x12" extension cabinet. When the extension cabinet was connected, the amp automatically converted to 50 watts per channel stereo.
- Flextone XL- A 100 watt amplifier with two 12" speakers, and foot controller for added effects.
- Flextone HD- A 300 watt amplifier head. Connects to separate 1x12", 2x12" or 4x12" speaker cabinets.

All amplifier models enabled the user to edit and store various guitar tones. These tones could be called up "on the fly" using either of two optional foot controller units.

=== Modeled Amplifiers ===
The original flextone series featured 16 amplifier simulations:

- Jazz Clean - based on Roland JC-120
- Small Tweed - based on Fender Tweed Deluxe
- Tweed Blues - based on Fender Bassman
- Black Panel - based on Fender Deluxe Reverb
- Modern Class A - based on Matchless Chieftain
- Brit Class A - based on Vox AC30
- Brit Blues - based on Marshall JTM-45
- Brit Classic - based on Marshall "Plexi"
- Brit Hi Gain - based on Marshall JCM 800
- Rectified - based on Mesa-Boogie Dual Rectifier
- Modern Hi Gain - based on Soldano SLO 100
- Flextone Clean - Line 6 hybrid clean
- Flextone Crunch - Line 6 "blues" amp
- Flextone Drive - Line 6 high-gain amp
- Flextone Layer - Line 6 "multi-amp" sound
- Fuzz - Simulates playing through a "Fuzz Face" pedal

=== Digital effects ===
The flextone amplifiers also gave the user access to a number of digital effects:

- Delay
- Chorus (2 variants)
- Flanger (2 variants)
- Tremolo
- Rotary Speaker Simulator
- Compressor
- Delay/Chorus (2 variants)
- Delay/Flanger (2 variants)
- Delay/Tremolo
- Delay/Compressor
- Delay/Swell
