= Wheelfall =

French metal band

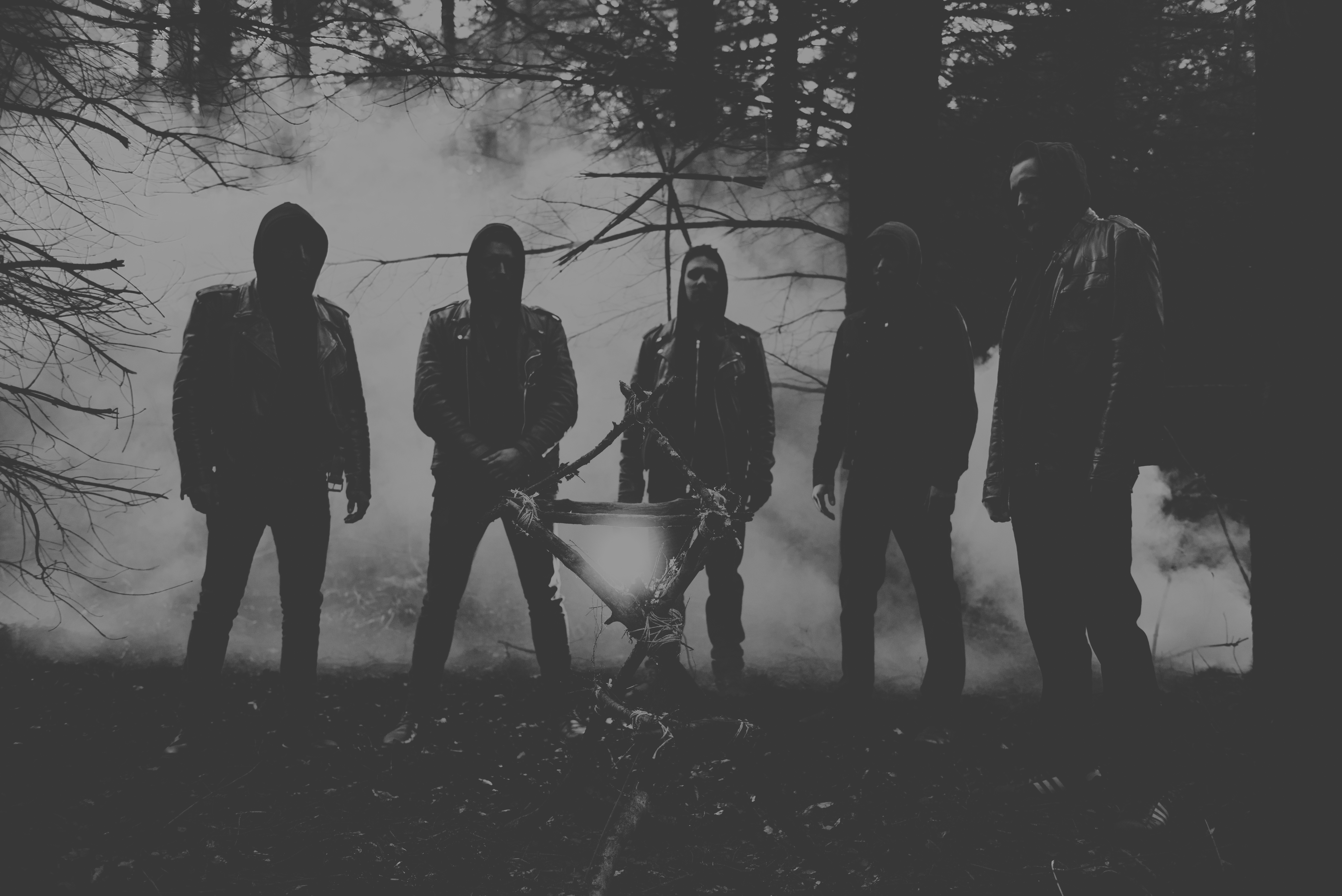

Background information
- Genres: Avant garde, industrial rock, black metal, sludge metal, doom metal (early), stoner rock (early)
- Years active: 2009–present
- Labels: Sunruin Records, Apathia Records, No Good To Anyone Productions
- Members: Fabien W. Furter; Niko El Moche; Florian Rambour; Thibaut Thieblemont; Maxime Hanné
- Past members: Niko Elbow Giraud; Quentin Vega; Skaparen
- Website: wheelfall.com

Wheelfall is an avant-garde metal band from France. Initially formed in 2009 as a stoner/doom band, Wheelfall progressed towards a more diverse sound, combining now influences from areas such as avant-garde metal, industrial music, post-metal, noise music, and post-hardcore among other genres.

Thus, there is a real divide between the first period of the band, extending from 2009 to 2012, and the second period beginning from the album Glasrew Point in 2015 after a hiatus of nearly two-year.

The band is known for its concept albums, combining music, storytelling, literature, and visuals. Wheelfall follows the concept of Gesamtkunstwerk through their records, to broach themes such as "the survival, the relation with technology and mass communication, the madness and loss of identity and ideals" and skepticism, which is a very recurrent doctrine in the concepts of the band.

== Creation and From the Blazing Sky at Dusk ==
In early 2009, Fabien W. Furter (aka FWF), Quentin Vega, Niko El Moche, and Florian Rambour created Wheelfall as a stoner doom band, following in the footsteps of bands such as Goatsnake and Kyuss.

The first disc of the group, From the Blazing Sky at Dusk, was released in 2010. It already shows the Do it yourself will of the band, having made all the stages of its production, from the recording (in members' garages) to its release, completely independently. This disc was pressed in a small number of CD copies that are hard to find now.

In tune with the times, Wheelfall decided to put it out as a free download on the internet, which allowed them to reach the international scene. This disc lays out the premises of the concept albums that the band will release later: it already contains a narration over the different songs, and the artwork depicts the story.

== Interzone and hiatus (2011–2015) ==
In late 2010, Quentin Vega is replaced by Niko Elbow on drums, which marks the beginning of the composition of the first album Interzone released in 2012. With this album, the band got to a greater notoriety, playing with Kadavar, Ramesses, Moonspell, or Punish Yourself. True to its DIY ethic, the album was released on the independent label Sunruin Records, founded by two members of Wheelfall.

The band begins on this album to use progressive structures, and we can note the presence of a story, narrated by music but also by visuals. Here we find the symbol of the tripod, present on all the band's visuals of this period, representing the themes of Wheelfall's lyrics.

The album title, Interzone refers to the place created by William S. Burroughs, the Beat Generation writer and shows the commitment of the band to experiments in art.

Following this album and a split album with A Very Old Ghost Behind the Farm, the band decided to withdraw from the media to question themselves, which leads to the composition of Glasrew Point. Wheelfall gave no news or gigs for 2 years and some of its members took part in various others bands: Niko Elbow in Joy / Disaster, and Fabien W. Furter released a solo album under the name FWF, "Skeptics", and joins the bands Chaos Echoes and Phazm.

== Glasrew Point and recent activities (2015 – present) ==
The band released the double album and novel "Glasrew Point" on 19 September 2015 via Sunruin Records. The album marks a stylistic break with the past of Wheelfall, which is now moving towards a more dark and experimental music, keeping the abrasive side of stoner doom music. There are some strong influences of industrial music, dark ambient and black metal within an atypical post-metal style. Thibaut Thieblemont joined Wheelfall for the composition of the album, playing keyboards, samples, third guitar, and back vocals.

The album was unanimously praised by critics, for its musical quality but also its ambitious concept. Indeed, Wheelfall pushes the Gesamtkunstwerk concept up to offer in addition to the double album (illustrated by Charlotte Bohn) a novella written by Blandine Bruyère based on the story narrated by Glasrew Point, illustrated by photographies (Marine Gerard and Pauline Talon) and paintings (Sylvie Thouron). The novella, double album, and visuals tell each one a facet of the concept of Glasrew Point.

Following the release of the album, Wheelfall signs with Apathia Records.

== Members ==
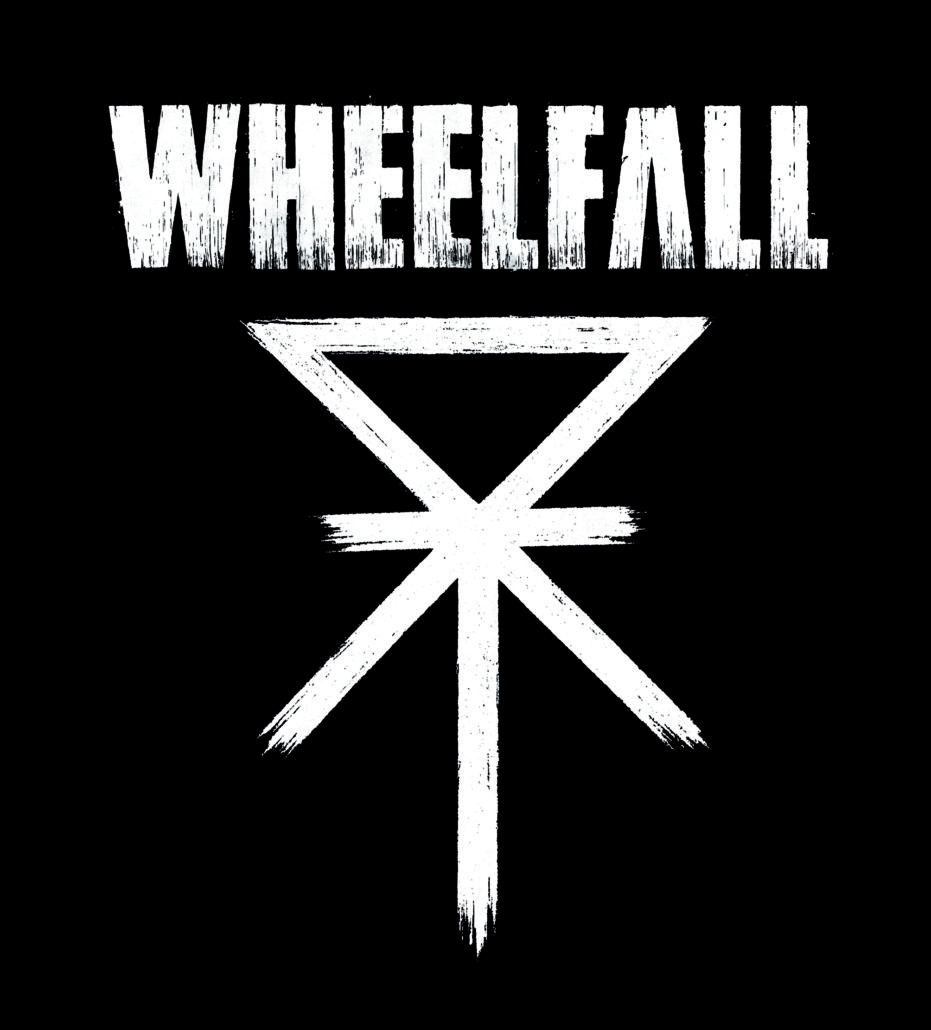
Wheelfall logo symbol

=== Current ===
- Fabien W. Furter – vocals, guitar(2009–present)
- Thibaut Marquis – bass(2017–present)
- Florian Rambour – guitar(2009–present)
- Thibaut Thieblemont – guitar, keyboards, effects, samples, backing vocals(2015–present)
- Maxime Hanné – Drums (2020–present)

=== Former ===
- Quentin Vega – Drums (2009–2010)
- Niko Elbow Giraud – Drums (2010–2015, 2019–2020)
- Skaparen – Drums (2016–2019)
- Niko El Moche – bass(2009–2017)

== Discography ==
=== Studio albums ===
- Interzone (2012, Sunruin Records)
- Glasrew Point double (2015, Sunruin Records / Apathia Records)
- The Atrocity Reports (2017, Apathia Records)
- A Spectre is Haunting the World (2020, No Good To Anyone Productions)

=== 7"/EPs ===
- From the Blazing Sky at Dusk CD (2010)

=== Splits ===
- split w A Very Old Ghost Behind the Farm CD (2012)

=== Live albums ===
- Live sessions 2013 CD (2015, Sunruin Records)

== Side projects ==
- Chaos Echoes – Death metal, drone and experimental music band with Fabien W. Furter on guitar (since 2015).
- Phazm – black metal and Death'n'roll band with Fabien W. Furter on bass from 2014 to 2016.
- FWF – dark ambient and experimental music solo project from Fabien W. Furter.
- Joy/Disaster – Rock/post-punk band with Niko Elbow Giraud
