= Selfcaged =

EP by Meshuggah
- Released: 11 April 1995
- Recorded: April–May 1994 (tracks 1–3)
- Venue: Hultsfredsfestivalen, Hultsfred, Sweden
- Studio: Garageland Studio, Umeå, Sweden
- Genre: Thrash metal; progressive metal
- Length: 19:03
- Label: Nuclear Blast

Meshuggah chronology
None (1994)	Selfcaged (1995)	Destroy Erase Improve (1995)

Selfcaged is the third EP by Swedish extreme metal band Meshuggah. It was initially recorded as a demo for the upcoming album Destroy Erase Improve but was eventually released in 1995 by Nuclear Blast as a teaser for the next album. Re-recordings of the tracks 1–3 on this EP appear on Destroy Erase Improve.

The album art, created by artist Alex Grey, features the centerpiece of his work "Deities and Demons Drinking from the Milky Pool".

== Track listing ==
No.	Title	Length
1.	"Vanished" (demo)	5:34
2.	"Suffer in Truth" (demo)	4:26
3.	"Inside What's Within Behind" (demo)	4:10
4.	"Gods of Rapture" (live)	4:53
Total length:		19:03

=== US version ===
No.	Title	Length
1.	"Gods of Rapture"	5:11
2.	"Humiliative"	5:17
3.	"Suffer in Truth" (demo)	4:19
4.	"Inside What's Within Behind" (demo)	4:10
5.	"Gods of Rapture" (live)	4:53
Total length:		23:50

== Personnel ==
- Jens Kidman – vocals
- Fredrik Thordendal – lead guitar, synthesizer, backing vocals
- Mårten Hagström – rhythm guitar, backing vocals
- Tomas Haake – drums, spoken vocals, backing vocals
- Peter Nordin – bass
