= Alive (Meshuggah video) =

Video by Meshuggah
- Released: 5 February 2010
- Recorded: 2008–2009 on the obZen Tour
- Genre: Djent, progressive metal, extreme metal
- Label: Nuclear Blast
- Director: Ian McFarland
- Producer: Ian McFarland

Meshuggah chronology
Alive (2010)	The Ophidian Trek (2014)

Professional ratings
Review scores
Source	Rating
About.com	4/5 stars
Exclaim!	favorable
PopMatters	8/10

Alive is the first live album by Swedish extreme metal band Meshuggah. The film was released as a double album (DVD with CD in digipak) through Nuclear Blast on 5 February 2010 in Europe and 9 February 2010 in North America.

Half of the film consists of the band performing songs on their obZen Tour during 2008–2009. This is intertwined with documentary-style clips of the members talking about their experiences in the band. Also on the DVD is "The Making of Bleed", a documentary on how the music video for "Bleed" was shot, along with the music video itself; and a "Drum Tour" and "Guitar Tour".

The cover is made to imitate the film poster for Alien.

== Track listing ==
=== DVD ===
1. "Begin"
2. "Perpetual Black Second"
3. "Twenty Two Hours"
4. "Pravus"
5. "Dissemination"
6. "Bleed"
7. "Ritual"
8. "New Millennium Cyanide Christ"
9. "Cleanse"
10. "Stengah"
11. "The Mouth Licking What You've Bled"
12. "Machine"
13. "Electric Red"
14. "Solidarius"
15. "Rational Gaze"
16. "Moment"
17. "Lethargica"
18. "Communicate"
19. "Combustion"
20. "Humiliative"
21. "Infinitum"
22. "Straws Pulled at Random"
23. "End"

=== Bonus material ===
1. "'Bleed' music video"
2. "The Making of 'Bleed'"
3. "Micha Guitar Tour"
4. "Tomas Drum Tour"

=== Live audio CD ===
No.	Title	City	Length
1.	"Perpetual Black Second"	Tokyo	4:32
2.	"Electric Red"	Tokyo	6:02
3.	"Rational Gaze"	Tokyo	5:35
4.	"Pravus"	Tokyo	5:21
5.	"Lethargica"	Toronto	5:52
6.	"Combustion"	Toronto	4:16
7.	"Straws Pulled at Random"	Toronto	5:05
8.	"New Millennium Cyanide Christ"	Montreal	4:57
9.	"Stengah"	Montreal	5:56
10.	"The Mouth Licking What You've Bled"	Montreal	3:25
11.	"Humiliative"	Montreal	5:21
12.	"Bleed"	Montreal	7:55

== Personnel ==
- Jens Kidman – vocals
- Fredrik Thordendal – lead guitar
- Mårten Hagström – rhythm guitar
- Tomas Haake – drums
- Dick Lövgren – bass
- Ian McFarland – direction, production
- Markus Staiger – executive production
- Chris O'Coin – assistant editing
- Joey Korenman – animation, design
- Daniel Bergstrand – mixing
- Nathan Bice – mixing

== Charts ==
Album charts

Chart (2010)	Peak position
French Albums (SNEP)	123
Greek Albums (IFPI)	25
Swedish Albums (Sverigetopplistan)	43

DVD charts

Chart (2010)	Peak position
Japanese Albums (Oricon)	290
