= ObZen Tour =

2008–09 concert tour by Meshuggah

obZen World Tour
- World tour by Meshuggah
- Meshuggah poster for the North American 2009 part of the tour
- Location: North America; Europe; Asia; Oceania
- Associated album: obZen
- Start date: February 15, 2008
- End date: February 20, 2009
- Legs: 4
- No. of shows: 101

Meshuggah concert chronology
- 2007 European Festival Tour; obZen World Tour (2008–09)

The obZen World Tour was a concert tour by Swedish extreme metal band Meshuggah, in support of the band's sixth studio album obZen.

It is the biggest tour the band has done to date; and the band travelled to places around the world they had previously not performed in. In 2009, Meshuggah returned to North America on a tour with Cynic and The Faceless.

The Alive concert film was produced during the tour.

== History ==
In 2007, Meshuggah returned to the studio to record their sixth album, obZen, which was released in March 2008. The band spent almost a year on the album; their longest recording session yet. A significant portion of the year was spent learning to perform the songs they wrote; the recording itself took six months. obZen reached number 59 on the Billboard Top 200 chart and sold 11,400 copies in the United States in its first week of release, and 50,000 copies after six months. With this album Meshuggah got more media attention and new fans. The release was followed by a world tour, which started in the US and proceeded to Europe, Asia and Australia.

== Song debuts ==
In the first North American leg, three new songs from the new album were slated into the band's setlist: Electric Red, Bleed and Pravus. In the 2009 North American leg, Meshuggah debuted a full live version of the song Bleed. Up until then, live shows featured a shorter version, one similar to the video edit of the song. This leg also saw the debuts of the songs Combustion and Lethargica, also from the obZen album.

== Typical setlist ==
Taken from show at Club Tochka in Moscow, Russia on October 4, 2008.

1. "Perpetual Black Second"
2. "Bleed"
3. "Humiliative"
4. "Stengah"
5. "The Mouth Licking What You've Bled"
6. "Electric Red"
7. "Suffer in Truth"
8. "Rational Gaze"
9. "Pravus"
10. "Straws Pulled at Random"
11. "Future Breed Machine"
  Encore
12. "Soul Burn"

== Tour dates ==
Date	City	Country	Venue
North American Leg I
February 15, 2008	Umeå	Sweden	House of Metal Headlining
In support of: Ministry and Hemlock on the C-U-LaTour
March 25, 2008	Spokane	United States	Big Easy
March 26, 2008	Calgary	Canada	Whiskey Nightclub*
March 27, 2008	Vancouver	Canada	Croatian Cultural Centre
March 28, 2008	Vancouver	Canada	Commodore Ballroom
March 29, 2008	Seattle	United States	The Showbox
March 30, 2008	Portland	United States	Roseland Theatre
April 1, 2008	San Francisco	United States	The Fillmore
April 2, 2008	San Francisco	United States	The Fillmore
April 5, 2008	Los Angeles	United States	House of Blues
April 6, 2008	Los Angeles	United States	House of Blues
April 7, 2008	San Diego	United States	House of Blues
April 8, 2008	Tempe	United States	Marquee Theatre
April 9, 2008	Las Vegas	United States	House of Blues
April 11, 2008	Salt Lake City	United States	SaltAir
April 12, 2008	Denver	United States	Ogden Theatre
April 15, 2008	Austin	United States	La Zona Rosa
April 16, 200	Tulsa	United States	Cain's Ballroom
April 17, 2008	Dallas	United States	Palladium
April 18, 2008	Houston	United States	Verizon Wireless Theater
April 19, 2008	New Orleans	United States	House of Blues
April 22, 2008	Orlando	United States	House of Blues
April 23, 2008	St. Petersburg	United States	Jannus Landing
April 24, 2008	Charlotte	United States	Tremont Music Hall
April 25, 2008	Atlanta	United States	The Masquerade
April 26, 2008	Baltimore	United States	Rams Head Live!
April 27, 2008	Worcester	United States	The Palladium
April 29, 2008	Philadelphia	United States	Theatre of Living Arts
May 1, 2008	New York City	United States	Irving Plaza
May 2, 2008	New York City	United States	Irving Plaza
May 3, 2008	Montreal	Canada	Metropolis
May 4, 2008	Toronto	Canada	Kool Haus
May 5, 2008	Cleveland	United States	Agora Theatre
May 7, 2008	Detroit	United States	Emerald Theatre
May 8, 2008	Chicago	United States	House of Blues
May 9, 2008	Chicago	United States	House of Blues
May 10, 2008	Chicago	United States	House of Blues
May 11, 2008	Chicago	United States	House of Blues
European Leg
Supported by: The Dillinger Escape Plan and Between the Buried and Me
June 20, 2008	Brussels	Belgium	VK
June 21, 2008	Tilburg	Netherlands	013
June 22, 2008	Clisson	France	Hellfest
June 24, 2008	Winterthur	Switzerland	Salzhaus
June 25, 2008	Prague	Czech Republic	Roxy
June 26, 2008	Warsaw	Poland	Progresja
June 27, 2008	Lindau	Germany	Vaudeville
June 28, 2008	Bologna	Italy	Gods of Metal
June 29, 2008	Bolzano	Italy	Palasport
July 2, 2008	Saarbrücken	Germany	Roxy
July 3, 2008	Aschaffenburg	Germany	Colos-Saal
July 4, 2008	Leipzig	Germany	With Full Force
July 5, 2008	Maribor	Slovenia	Metalcamp
July 20, 2008	Athens	Greece	Rock 'Em All Festival
July 31, 2008	Storås	Norway	Storåsfestivalen
August 8, 2008	Mikkeli	Finland	Jurassic Rock Festival
August 15, 2008	Hasselt	Belgium	Pukkelpop
August 16, 2008	Budapest	Hungary	Sziget Festival
August 29, 2008	Bergen	Norway	Hole in the Sky
August 30, 2008	Gothenburg	Sweden	Brew House
August 31, 2008	Malmö	Sweden	KB
Supported by: Trigger the Bloodshed and others.
September 1, 2008	Hamburg	Germany	Logo
September 2, 2008	Wiesbaden	Germany	Kulturzentrum Schlachthof
September 3, 2008	Amsterdam	Netherlands	Melkweg
September 4, 2008	Brighton	England	Barfly
September 5, 2008	London	England	Astoria 2
September 6, 2008	Newcastle	England	Academy
September 8, 2008	Glasgow	Scotland	Garage
September 9, 2008	Manchester	England	Manchester Academy
September 10, 2008	Sheffield	England	Corporation
September 11, 2008	Birmingham	England	Academy 2
September 12, 2008	Bristol	England	Academy 2
September 13, 2008	Nottingham	England	Rock City
September 15, 2008	Brussels	Belgium	Ancienne Belgique
September 16, 2008	Köln	Germany	Underground
September 17, 2008	Lucerne	Switzerland	Schuur
September 18, 2008	Vienna	Austria	Szene Wien
September 19, 2008	Munich	Germany	Backstage
September 20, 2008	Berlin	Germany	Kato
Supported by: Scarpoint and CB Murdoc
September 22, 2008	Stockholm	Sweden	Debaser Medis
October 4, 2008	Moscow	Russia	Club Tochka
October 5, 2008	Saint Petersburg	Russia	Orlandina
Oceania & Asia Leg
Supported by: New Way Home
October 10, 2008	Auckland	New Zealand	Transmission Room
Supported by: Alchemist
October 12, 2008	Brisbane	Australia	The Arena
October 13, 2008	Sydney	Australia	Roundhouse
October 14, 2008	Adelaide	Australia	HQ
October 15, 2008	Melbourne	Australia	The Palace
October 16, 2008	Perth	Australia	Capitol
October 18, 2008	Tokyo	Japan	Loudpark Festival
October 20, 2008	Osaka	Japan	Club Quattro Headlining
North American Leg II
Supported by: Cynic and The Faceless
February 1, 2009	Anaheim	United States	House of Blues
February 2, 2009	San Diego	United States	House of Blues
February 3, 2009	Los Angeles	United States	House of Blues
February 4, 2009	San Francisco	United States	Slim's
February 6, 2009	Seattle	United States	El Corazón
February 7, 2009	Portland	United States	Hawthorne Theatre
February 8, 2009	Vancouver	Canada	Commodore Ballroom
February 9, 2009	Spokane	United States	Knitting Factory
February 11, 2009	Englewood	United States	Gothic Theatre
February 12, 2009	Des Moines	United States	People's Court
February 13, 2009	Saint Paul	United States	Station 4
February 14, 2009	Milwaukee	United States	Eagles Club
February 15, 2009	Chicago	United States	House of Blues
February 17, 2009	Toronto	Canada	Phoenix Concert Theatre
February 18, 2009	Montreal	Canada	Club Soda
February 19, 2009	New York City	United States	Irving Plaza
February 20, 2009	Towson	United States	Recher Theatre
European Leg II
April 8, 2009	Uppsala	Sweden	Konsert & Kongress
April 9, 2009	Oslo	Norway	Inferno Festival
April 10, 2009	Karlstad	Sweden	Arena Nattklubb
April 11, 2009	Örnsköldsvik	Sweden	Musikhuset
April 12, 2009	Umeå	Sweden	Scharinska
April 13, 2009	Tampere	Finland	Klubi
April 14, 2009	Helsinki	Finland	Nosturi
April 25, 2009	Stockholm	Sweden	Melloboat
June 12, 2009	Donington Park	England	Download Festival
June 26, 2009	Gothenburg	Sweden	Metaltown Festival
June 27, 2009	Gothenburg	Sweden	Metaltown Festival
June 28, 2009	Gothenburg	Sweden	Metaltown Festival
July 11, 2009	Nijmegen	Netherlands	Fortarock Festival
July 12, 2009	Kraków	Poland	Knock Out Festival
July 16, 2009	Dour	Belgium	Dour Festival
July 18, 2009	Hultsfred	Sweden	Sonisphere Festival
July 24, 2009	Lorca	Spain	Lorca Rock Festival
July 25, 2009	Lorca	Spain	Lorca Rock Festival

- Meshuggah missed their date at the Whiskey Nightclub, with the official story that they did not have their paperwork in order and they were delayed trying to cross the border into Canada.
