= Six Tears of Sorrow =

EP by Scarve
- Released: August 1996
- Recorded: By Scarve with Bruno Objoie & Bruno Donini at Studio Caraibes, Brussels, May 1996
- Genre: Death metal
- Length: 29:12
- Label: Self-released
- Producer: Scarve

Professional ratings
Review scores
Source	Rating
Chronicles of Chaos	7/10

Six Tears of Sorrow is the debut EP released by French metal band Scarve.

== Track listing ==
1. "Liquefied Silhouettes" (Dirk Verbeuren, Scarve) – 4:00
2. "Shelly's Dead" (Fred Bartolomucci, Scarve) – 4:22
3. "Blackloader" (Dirk Verbeuren, Scarve, Seb Daniel) – 4:17
4. "Torn Underneath" (Dirk Verbeuren, Scarve) – 5:10
5. "IMDI" (Fred Bartolomucci, Scarve) – 5:14
6. "Anchored in Melancholy" (Dirk Verbeuren, Scarve) – 6:09

== Personnel ==
- Fred Bartolomucci – vocals
- Sylvain Coudret – lead guitar
- Patrick Martin – rhythm guitar
- David Fioraso – bass guitar
- Dirk Verbeuren – drums
