= Scarve =

French death metal band

- Origin: Nancy, France
- Genres: Technical death metal; thrash metal; groove metal
- Years active: 1994–2009 (hiatus)
- Labels: Listenable, War Music
- Members: Lawrence Mackrory; Patrick Martin; Sylvain Coudret; Loïc Colin; Dirk Verbeuren
- Past members: Pierrick Valence; Guillaume Bideau; Alain Germonville; Philippe Elter

Scarve is a French technical death metal band from Nancy. They have released four full-length albums, the latest being The Undercurrent, released in 2007.

== History ==
Scarve was formed in 1994 by rhythm guitarist Patrick Martin and drummer Dirk Verbeuren, the latter of whom later joined Soilwork, and is now with Megadeth. Their 2004 album, Irradiant, features a contribution from Meshuggah guitarist Fredrik Thordendal on the track "Asphyxiate".

=== Vocalist departures and The Undercurrent ===
In October 2006, Guillaume Bideau left Scarve during the recording of The Undercurrent to take over as lead singer in Danish industrial metal band Mnemic. His session replacement was announced to be ex-Darkane singer, Lawrence Mackrory, who sang on the album Rusted Angel.

Following the release of The Undercurrent, on 4 June, Pierrick Valence announced that he was leaving Scarve to focus on his other band, Phazm. On 22 April 2007, the band posted a message on their Myspace page saying that they were looking for a vocalist.

In May 2009, the band revealed their new vocalist, Lawrence Mackrory, who sung on The Undercurrent and their next album. Verbeuren said on their Myspace blog, "We're all very proud and happy to have Lawrence in our ranks, and extremely excited to bring you, our fans, a whole new collection of blasting futuristic death metal!"

Scarve has been on an unofficial hiatus since 2009, and have not performed live since 2007. Verbeuren currently performs with Megadeth and Sylvain Coudret is with Soilwork, while Loïc Colin joined American death metal band Solium Fatalis, which features current members of Cryptopsy.

== Members ==
Current

- Lawrence Mackrory (Darkane) – vocals (2007, 2009–present)
- Patrick Martin – rhythm guitar (1994–present)
- Sylvain Coudret (Soilwork) – lead guitar (1994–present)
- Loïc Colin – bass guitar (2001–present)
- Dirk Verbeuren (Megadeth) – drums (1994–present)

Live members

- Gilles Delecroix – drums (2007)
- Butcho Vukovic – vocals (2007)
- Benoit Antonia – guitar (2004)

Former

- Alain Germonville – co-lead vocals (1998–2001)
- Guillaume Bideau (Mnemic) – co-lead vocals (1998–2006, died in 2022)
- Pierrick Valence – co-lead vocals (2001–2007)
- Fred Bartolomucci – vocals (1994–1998)
- Philipe Elter – bass guitar (1998–2001)
- David Fioraso – bass guitar (1994–1997)
- Julien Thibers – bass guitar (1997–1998)

Timeline

== Discography ==
- Six Tears of Sorrow (1996, self-released)
- Translucence (2000, War Music)
- Luminiferous (2002, Listenable Records)
- Irradiant (2004, Listenable Records)
- The Undercurrent (2007, Listenable Records)
