= Mats/Morgan Band =

Musical group

- Genres: Avant-prog; jazz fusion; art rock
- Members: Morgan Ågren (drums); Mats Öberg (keyboards)

Mats/Morgan Band (formerly Hot Rats and Zappsteetoot) is a Swedish progressive rock band that features Morgan Ågren and Mats Öberg. Morgan is a drummer and composer and Mats is a keyboard player and composer. The band is a showcase for their virtuosic skills on their respective instruments as well as their compositional skills. Their music is difficult to categorize, containing elements of jazz, electronic music, waltz, dance music, avant garde/free jazz, techno, rock, progressive and modern classical music.

Morgan Ågren has been a drummer since age four. Born in Umeå, Sweden, Ågren was spotted as an outstanding talent at a young age as he began performing publicly at age seven, and eventually joined forces with keyboardist Mats Öberg in 1981. Mats has been blind since birth.

They later formed Zappsteetoot together in 1984, a band internationally known for performing Frank Zappa's music. In 1988, Ågren and Öberg were invited by Zappa to do a guest performance at his Stockholm performance. Frank Zappa then invited them to the United States to partake in several projects, including the 1991 Zappa's Universe shows in New York, which Zappa was already too ill to attend, as well as a sold out New York performance of Zappa's classical program at Lincoln Centers Great Performers Series at Avery Fisher Hall.

Morgan Ågren also collaborated with the guitarist of Swedish experimental metal band Meshuggah, Fredrik Thordendal, on the album Sol Niger Within, which was released in 1997.

== Lineup ==
- Morgan Ågren
- Mats Öberg

with

- Jimmy Ågren
- Robert Elovsson
- Tommy Tordsson

Guest musicians (in recordings and events)

- Fredrik Thordendal
- Jonas Knutsson
- Artis the Spoonman
- Mattias "IA" Eklundh
- Lars Hollmer
- JJ Marsh

== Discography ==
=== Frank Zappa ===
- Frank Zappa – Stockholm 01.05.88 boot (Performed T'Mershi Duween with the band)
- Various Artists – Zappa's Universe
- Various Artists – Zappanale # 15 (2004, 3CD, arf society)

=== Mats/Morgan Band ===
- Trends and Other Diseases (1996)
- The Music or the Money… (1997)
- Radio Da Da (1998, ultimate audio entertainment)
- The Teenage Tapes (1998, ultimate audio entertainment)
- Live (2001, ultimate audio entertainment)
- On Air with Guests (2002, ultimate audio entertainment)
- Thanks for Flying with Us (2005, Cuneiform Records)
- Heat Beats Live + Tourbook 1991–2007 (2008, Cuneiform Records)
- Schack Tati (2014, Cuneiform Records)
- 35th Anniversary Collection (2016, Morgan Records (not the cars))
- Live with Norrlandsoperan Symphony Orchestra (2018, Morgan Records (not the cars))
