= Chaosphere =

Studio album by Meshuggah
- Released: 9 November 1998
- Recorded: May–July 1998
- Studio: Dug-Out, Uppsala, Sweden; Area 51 and Uae-Function studio, Stockholm, Sweden
- Genre: Progressive metal; groove metal; avant-garde metal; djent
- Length: 47:20
- Label: Nuclear Blast
- Producer: Daniel Bergstrand, Fredrik Thordendal

Meshuggah chronology
| The True Human Design (1997) | Chaosphere (1998) | Rare Trax (2001) |

Professional ratings
Review scores
| Source | Rating |
|---|---|
| Allmusic | 4/5 stars |
| Collector's Guide to Heavy Metal | 9/10 |
| The Encyclopedia of Popular Music | 3/5 stars |
| Pitchfork | 8.6/10 |

Chaosphere is the third studio album by Swedish extreme metal band Meshuggah. It was released on 9 November 1998 by Nuclear Blast, and is the only studio album to feature bassist Gustaf Hielm. Chaosphere's sound shows the band toning down some of the thrash style of their previous releases in favor of the technical, polyrhythmic, groove-oriented sound they would continue to explore on subsequent albums. A video was made for "New Millennium Cyanide Christ".

The Japanese version of the album contains a bonus song, titled "Unanything", as track 9. This song was also included on the promotional card-sleeve CD as track 6. On both this and the standard album release, after "Elastic" there is a period of silence then an unlisted and unindexed track where all of the album's songs are played at once, with volume changes making each song somewhat dominant and recognisable in the mix at different times.

The "Reloaded" re-release features five of the six tracks from The True Human Design EP.

== Track listing ==
All lyrics are written by Tomas Haake, except "Neurotica" by Mårten Hagström.

| No. | Title | Music | Length |
|---|---|---|---|
| 1. | "Concatenation" | Thordendal | 4:14 |
| 2. | "New Millennium Cyanide Christ" | Thordendal, Hagström | 5:35 |
| 3. | "Corridor of Chameleons" | Thordendal | 5:02 |
| 4. | "Neurotica" | Hagström | 5:19 |
| 5. | "The Mouth Licking What You've Bled" | Thordendal | 3:57 |
| 6. | "Sane" | Kidman, Hagström | 3:48 |
| 7. | "The Exquisite Machinery of Torture" | Haake, Thordendal | 3:55 |
| 8. | "Elastic" | Hagström | 15:30 |
| Total length: | | | 47:20 |

Japanese bonus track
| No. | Title | Music | Length |
|---|---|---|---|
| 9. | "Unanything" | Meshuggah | 3:01 |
| Total length: | | | 50:21 |

Re-release bonus tracks
| No. | Title | Music | Length |
|---|---|---|---|
| 10. | "Sane" (demo version) | Kidman, Hagström | 4:07 |
| 11. | "Future Breed Machine" (Mayhem version) | Meshuggah | 8:12 |
| 12. | "Futile Bread Machine" (Campfire version) | Meshuggah | 3:30 |
| 13. | "Future Breed Machine" (Quant's Quantastical Quantasm) | Meshuggah | 7:31 |
| 14. | "Future Breed Machine" (Remix) | Meshuggah | 6:48 |
| Total length: | | | 80:29 |

== Personnel ==
=== Meshuggah ===
- Jens Kidman – vocals
- Fredrik Thordendal – lead guitar, keyboards
- Mårten Hagström – rhythm guitar
- Gustaf Hielm – bass
- Tomas Haake – drums, vocals (tracks 6–7, 12)

=== Production ===
- Daniel Bergstrand – recording, mixdown
- Fredrik Thordendal – recording, mixdown
- Peter in de Betou – mastering (at Cutting Room, Stockholm, Sweden)
- Tomas Haake – artwork, design
- Meshuggah – art direction
- John Norhager – band photo
