= The Undercurrent (album) =

Studio album by Scarve
- Released: April 2, 2007
- Recorded: Dug-Out studio in Uppsala, Sweden
- Genres: Technical death metal, melodic death metal
- Length: 37:04
- Label: Listenable
- Producer: Daniel Bergstrand

Scarve chronology
Irradiant (2004)	The Undercurrent (2007)

Professional ratings
Review scores
Source	Rating
About.com	link
Allmusic	link

The Undercurrent is the fourth studio album by French band Scarve. This is their first studio album to not feature Guillaume Bideau, and the last to feature Pierrick Valence. Due to absence of Bideau the band hired ex-Darkane frontman Lawrence Mackory to do the clean vocals.

== Track listing ==
1. "Endangered" – 4:03
2. "Imperceptible Armageddon" – 4:31
3. "Senseless" – 2:35
4. "The Plundered" – 6:23
5. "Assuming Self" – 3:11
6. "Fathomless Descent" – 3:40
7. "A Few Scrap of Memories" – 5:51
8. "Rebirth" – 6:50
9. "Alteration" - 3:44 (re-recording from Luminiferous album)

== Personnel ==
- Lawrence Mackrory – clean vocals
- Pierrick Valence – harsh vocals
- Sylvain Coudret – lead guitar
- Patrick Martin – rhythm guitar
- Loic Colin – bass
- Dirk Verbeuren – drums
