= Irradiant (album) =

Studio album by Scarve
- Released: January 26, 2004
- Genre: Technical death metal, thrash metal
- Length: 44:18
- Label: Listenable
- Producer: Daniel Bergstrand; Örjan Örnkloo

Scarve chronology
Luminiferous (2002)	Irradiant (2004)	The Undercurrent (2007)

Professional ratings
Review scores
Source	Rating
Allmusic	4/5 stars
Metal-Rules	4/5 stars
Your Last Rites	(favorable)

Irradiant is the third album by the French technical death metal band Scarve. This is the last album to feature Guillaume Bideau's vocals as he joined the Danish industrial metal band Mnemic in October 2006. The digipak version of the album includes two live bonus tracks "Heaven-Sent" and "Luminiferous", two video clips; "Mirthless Perspectives" and "Emulate the Soul" as well as an extended CD-ROM feature.

Fredrik Thordendal of Meshuggah contributed a guitar solo on the song "Asphyxiate", while Gustaf Jorde of Defleshed contributed extra vocals to the song "Molten Scars".

"Mirthless Perspectives" and "Emulate the Soul" were made as music videos.

"Irradiant" was released as a single.

== Track listing ==
1. "Mirthless Perspectives" – 3:45 (5:13 in the Digipak Edition, there's an intro for the song of 1:27)
2. "An Emptier Void" – 3:39
3. "Irradiant" – 4:05
4. "Asphyxiate" – 4:52 (featuring Fredrik Thordendal of Meshuggah)
5. "Hyperconscience" – 4:16
6. "The Perfect Disaster" – 5:13
7. "Molten Scars" – 2:46 (featuring Gustaf Jorde of Defleshed)
8. "Fire Proven" – 6:29
9. "Boiling Calm" – 7:44

=== Digipak version ===
- "Heaven-Sent" (live bonus track) - 3:56
- "Luminiferous" (live bonus track) - 4:47

== Credits ==
=== Band members ===
- Pierrick Valence − harsh vocals
- Guillaume Bideau − clean/harsh vocals
- Patrick Martin − rhythm guitar
- Sylvain Coudret − rhythm/lead guitar
- Loïc Colin − bass guitar
- Dirk Verbeuren − drums

=== Guest musicians ===
- Fredrik Thordendal − guitar solo on "Asphyxiate"
- Gustaf Jorde − vocals on "Molten Scars"
