= Phazm =

French metal band

Phazm is a French death metal band. They released four albums, all on Osmose Productions.

The band was formed in 2003 in Nancy. Playing a subgenre of death metal, Phazm has been listed as one of the prime examples of death 'n' roll.

The vocalist Pierrick Valence also did the vocals in Scarve, until quitting that band in 2007 to focus on Phazm. In the same year, the band was joined by Victo Villchez of Yrkoon and Gorgor of Agressor. The band dissolved in 2009, but returned in 2016 with another album.

== Discography ==
- Hate at First Seed (2004)
- Antebellum Death 'n Roll (2006)
- Cornerstone of the Macabre (2008)
- Scornful of Icons (2016)

== External link ==
- Discogs

=== Further reading ===
- Review of Hate at First Seed by Metal Fan (in Dutch)
- Review of Hate at First Seed by Slug Mag
- Review of Antebellum Death 'n Roll by Metal Temple
- Review of Antebellum Death 'n Roll by Last Rites
- Review of Antebellum Death 'n Roll by Stormbringer.at (in German)
- Review of Cornerstone of the Macabre by Metal Storm
- Review of Cornerstone of the Macabre by Metal Rage

- Review of Scornful of Icons by Soundscape Magazine
- Review of Scornful of Icons by Wonderbox Metal
- Review of Scornful of Icons by Metal Fan (in Dutch)
- Review of Scornful of Icons by FFM-Rock (in German)
