= Line 6 (company) =

American audio equipment manufacturer

- Type: Subsidiary
- Industry: Amplification, Musical instruments
- Founded: 1996; 30 years ago
- Founder: Susan Wolf, Marcus Ryle and Michel Doidic
- Headquarters: Calabasas, California, United States
- Area served: United States, Europe, Japan
- Products: Guitar effects, guitar amplifiers, Software, Electric guitars, Wireless systems
- Parent: Yamaha Corporation
- Website: line6.com

Line 6 is a musical instrument and audio equipment manufacturer, best known for guitar amplifier and effect modeling. The company's products include guitar effects, modeling guitar amplifiers, software, electric guitars, and wireless systems. Line 6 has an active user community, and provides software that allows users to easily download and share patches or device settings for many of the company's products. Founded in 1996 and headquartered in Calabasas, California, the company has been a subsidiary of Yamaha Corporation since 2014.

== History ==
=== Origin ===
Susan Wolf together with Marcus Ryle and Michel Doidic (two former Oberheim designers) co-founded Fast-Forward Designs, where they helped develop several notable pro audio products such as the Alesis ADAT, Quadraverbs and QuadraSynth, and Digidesign SampleCell. As digital signal processing (DSP) became more powerful and affordable during the 1980s, they began developing DSP-based products which would emulate the tones of classic guitar amplifiers, cabinets, and effects. According to Ryle, the name "Line 6" came about because the phone system at Fast-Forward Designs only had 5 lines. Because the new guitar-related products were developed in secrecy, the receptionist used "Line 6" as a code word of sorts, and paging them for a call on Line 6 meant to stop any guitar or amp-related sounds so that they would not be overheard by other Fast-Forward clients or callers.

=== Launch and success ===
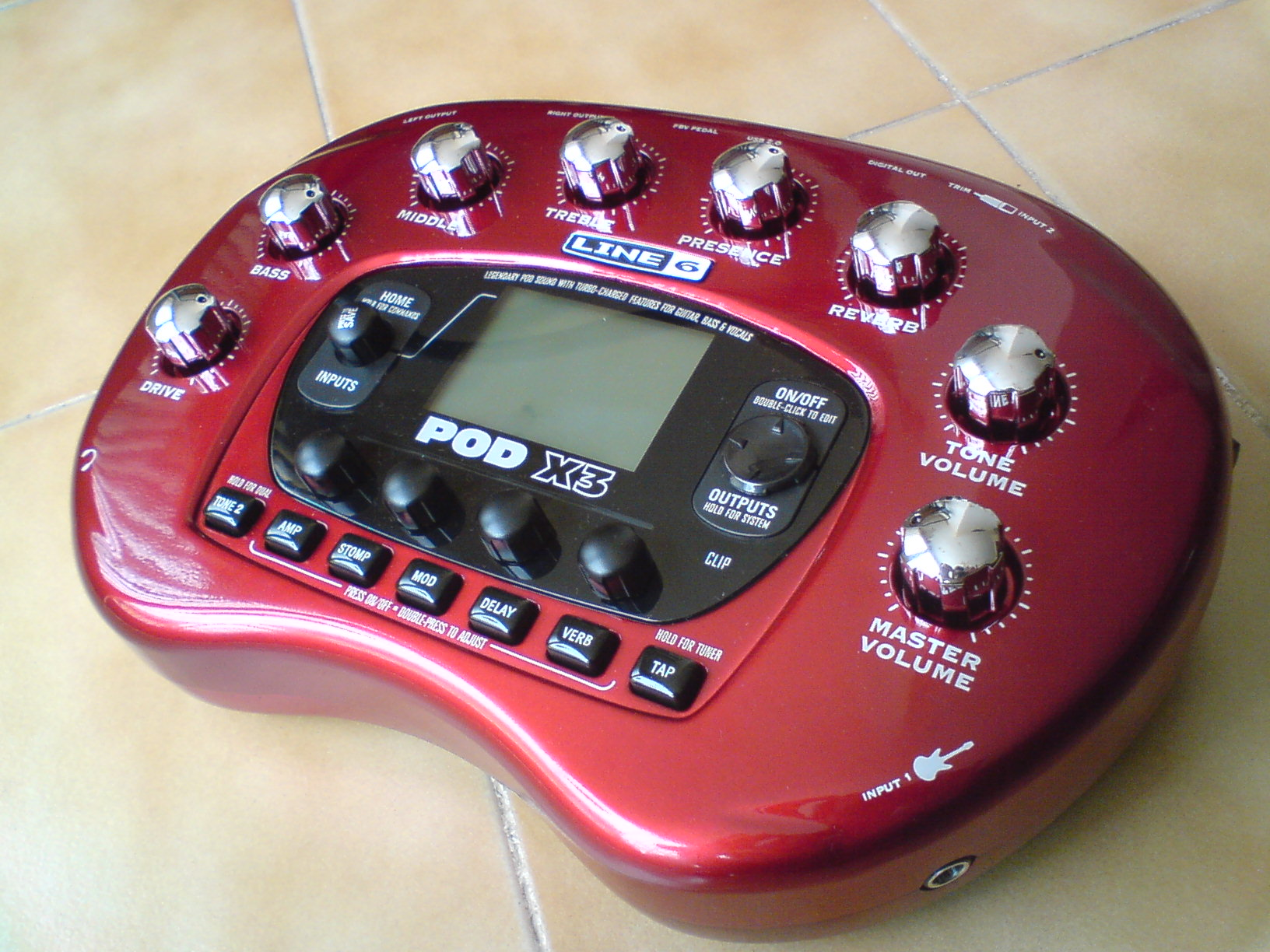
Pod X3 "bean"

Line 6 launched in 1996 with their first digital modeling amplifier, the AxSys 212, a combo amp using two 12" speakers. This was followed in 1997 by the Flextone modeling combo amp and in 1998 by the modeling software Amp Farm, which became popular among music producers and professional guitarists using Pro Tools.

Fearing that digital modeling was beyond the reach of ordinary guitarists, Line 6 sought to design an affordable, simple, standalone guitar amp and effects modeler with a unique look. This led to the company's breakthrough product, the 1998 POD, a famously red, kidney bean-shaped desktop processor that emulated 15 classic amplifier models with multiple speaker cabinet options and onboard effects. Premier Guitar described the original POD as instigating "a long-overdue liberation" from cheap practice amps and expensive vintage amps. Line 6 subsequently expanded the POD into a family of products, with later additions increasing the line's amp choices and processing power.

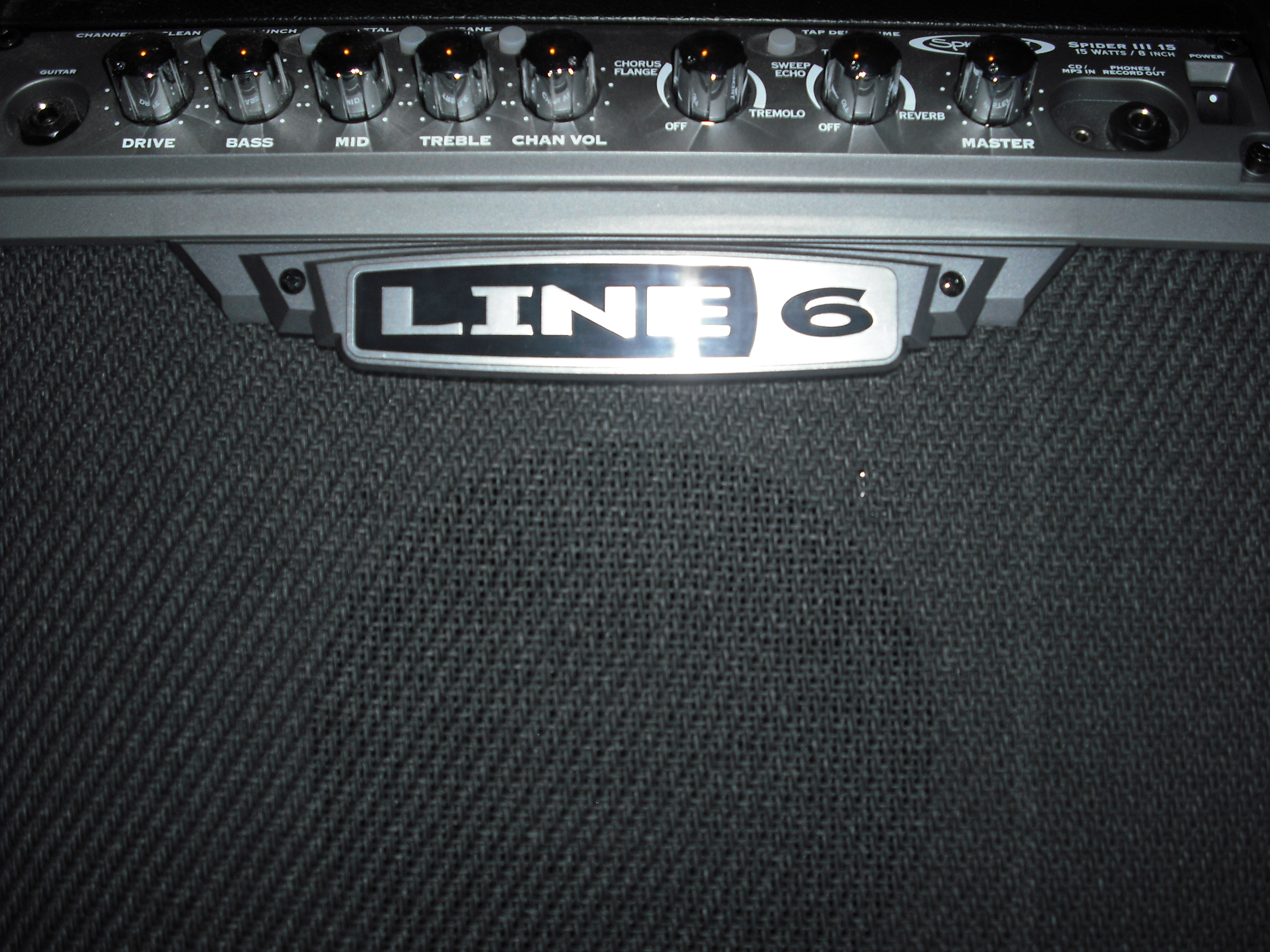
A Spider III Amp.

The following year, Line 6 launched the Spider series of modeling amps with the Spider 112 and Spider 210, as well as their "Stompbox Modeler" series of modeling effects pedals with the DL4 Delay Modeler and MM4 Modulation Modeler.

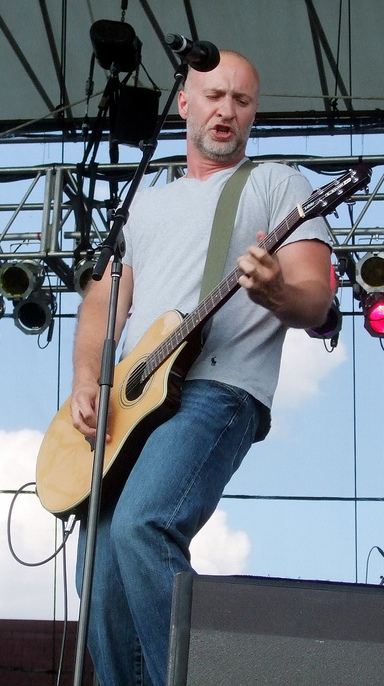
Bob Mould performing with a Line 6 Variax acoustic guitar.

In 2002, Line 6 introduced the Variax line of electric, acoustic, and bass guitars.

In early 2008, Line 6 acquired X2 Digital Wireless, who had introduced digital wireless systems for guitar. Further developing this technology, Line 6 developed and introduced a family of digital wireless microphone systems in 2010.

In light of increased market competition from companies like Fractal Audio, Kemper, and Neural DSP, Line 6 launched its flagship modeling effects unit, the Helix, in 2015. The Helix has since expanded into a successful family of products.

=== Change in ownership ===
In December 2013, it was confirmed that Line 6 was to be bought by Yamaha Corporation, to operate as a wholly owned subsidiary with the internal management remaining the same. In 2017, Line 6 became part of Yamaha's first-ever guitar division, which became Yamaha Guitar Group, Inc. the following year.

== Notable products ==
=== POD ===
The POD, released in 1998, was Line 6's breakthrough product, a red, kidney bean-shaped desktop processor that emulated 15 classic amplifier models and offered onboard effects. Following its success, the company increased the number of simulated amps in subsequent iterations of the desktop POD, like the POD 2.0 and POD XT. Format changes came in 2003 and 2004, with the rackmount POD XT Pro and floor modeler POD XT Live, respectively.

=== DL4 ===
Following the success of the POD, Line 6 introduced the DL4 digital delay pedal in 1999 as part of a series of groundbreaking digital effects pedals. It models 16 vintage delay effects, including the Echoplex, Space Echo, and the Electro-Harmonix Deluxe Memory Man, and featured a looping function. Premier Guitar credited the DL4 for expanding on the capabilities of a typical delay pedal and creating its own niche that influenced indie and experimental music. Users include Joe Perry, Dave Grohl, Joe Satriani, and Thom Yorke. Line 6 released a MKII version in 2024.

=== Variax ===
Line 6's Variax series, produced between 2002 and 2023, used internal electronics to process the sound from individual strings to emulate the sound of specific guitars and other instruments, such as a banjo and sitar. The Variax was available primarily in electric guitar models, but acoustic and electric bass guitar models were available in the past.

=== Helix ===
Line 6 launched the floorboard modeler Helix in 2015 as its next-generation flagship modeling effects unit, utilizing a then-newly-developed "HX" engine that supported 72 amp models, 37 speaker cabinets, 16 microphone models, and 194 effects. The Helix has since expanded into a successful family of products, including the smaller HX Stomp and HX Stomp XL, and the Helix LT, with the diminutive Stomp consistently ranking as the top seller among all amp modelers and effects processors on Reverb.com.

In November 2025, Line 6 expanded its multi-effects lineup with the release of the Helix Stadium series, introducing an updated processing architecture and the proprietary Agoura modeling methodology.
