= Line 6 POD =

Guitar amplifier modeler

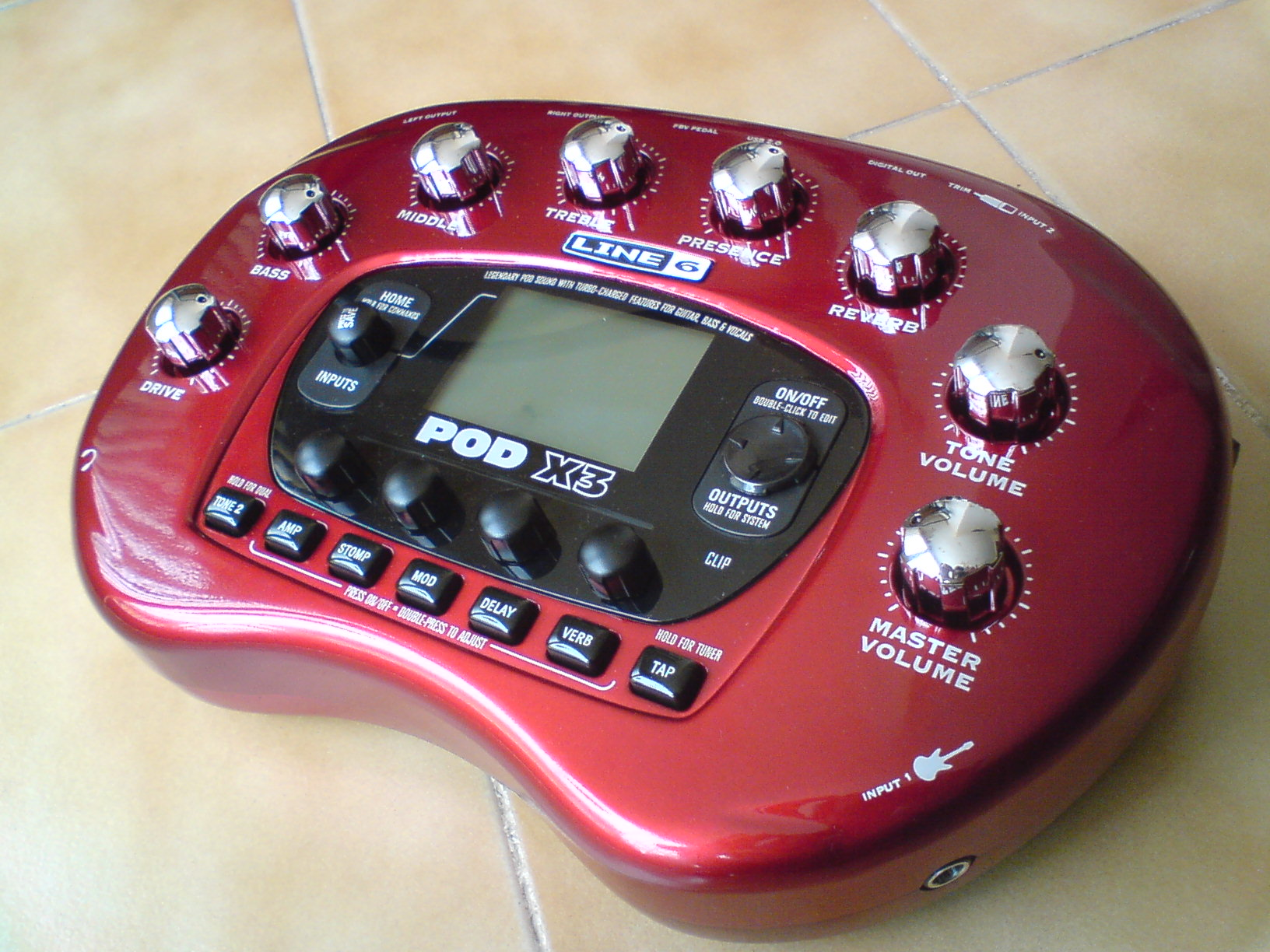
Pod X3 "bean"

The Line 6 POD is a series of digital guitar amplifier modelers produced by Line 6.

== History ==
By the mid-1990s, Line 6 feared that digital modeling was beyond the reach of ordinary guitarists and sought to design an affordable, simple, standalone amp and effects modeler with a unique look. This resulted in the company's breakthrough product, the 1998 POD, a famously red, kidney bean-shaped desktop processor that emulated 15 classic amplifier models with multiple speaker cabinet options and onboard effects. Premier Guitar described the original POD as instigating "a long-overdue liberation" from cheap practice amps and expensive vintage amps. Following the success of the original POD, Line 6 increased the number of simulated amps to 32 and added cabinet emulation for the POD 2.0 released in 2000. This increased to 42 amps with 60 onboard effects for the 2002 POD XT, which had a companion model for bass, the Bass POD XT. Format changes came in 2003 and 2004, with the rackmount POD XT Pro and floor modeler POD XT Live, respectively.

== Product models and variants ==
=== Studio ===
- POD – 16 guitar amp models
- POD 2.0 – 32 guitar amp models
- POD PRO – 32 guitar amp models
- POD xt – 36 guitar amp models
- POD xt PRO – 36 guitar amp models
- POD X3 – 78 guitar amp models and 28 bass amp models
- POD X3 PRO – 78 guitar amp models and 28 bass amp models
- Bass POD – 16 bass amp models
- Bass POD PRO – 16 bass amp models
- Bass POD xt – 28 bass amp models
- Bass POD xt PRO – 28 bass amp models
- POD HD – 16 guitar amp models
- POD HD PRO – 25 guitar amp models
- POD HD PRO X – 25 guitar amp models

=== Stage ===
The Floor POD and Live series are variants of the standard PODs designed for live stage performance. They are similar in appearance to an effects pedal combined with a simplified mixing console.

- Floor POD – 12 guitar amp models.
- Floor POD Plus – 32 guitar amp models
- POD xt Live – 42 guitar amp models
- POD X3 Live – 78 guitar amp models and 28 bass amp models
- Bass Floor POD – 5 bass amp models
- Bass POD xt Live – 28 bass amp models
- POD HD300 – 16 guitar amp models
- POD HD400 – 16 guitar amp models
- POD HD500 – 22 guitar amp models
- POD HD500X – 30 guitar amp models
- POD Go - 300 + effects and amp models

=== Mobile ===
- Pocket POD – A pocket-sized POD designed for easier portability, featuring 32 guitar amp models
- Pocket POD Express – A budget version of the Pocket POD, featuring five guitar amp models
- POD Go Express - A budget version of the Pod Go, with seven amps, seven cabs, seventeen effects, and a looper.
- POD Go Express Bass - A bass version of the Pod Go Express, with seven amps, seven cabs, seventeen effects, and a looper.
