= Destroy Erase Improve =

Studio album by Meshuggah
- Released: 12 May 1995
- Recorded: February 1995
- Studios: Soundfront Studios (Uppsala, Sweden)
- Genres: Progressive metal; groove metal; avant-garde metal
- Length: 46:31
- Label: Nuclear Blast
- Producers: Daniel Bergstrand, Meshuggah

Meshuggah chronology
Selfcaged (1995)	Destroy Erase Improve (1995)	The True Human Design (1997)

Professional ratings
Review scores
Source	Rating
Allmusic	4.5/5 stars
Collector's Guide to Heavy Metal	9/10
The Encyclopedia of Popular Music	4/5 stars
Kerrang!	3/5 stars
Pitchfork	7.9/10
Punknews.org	5/5 stars

Destroy Erase Improve is the second studio album by Swedish extreme metal band Meshuggah, released on 12 May 1995 by Nuclear Blast. This is the first studio album to feature rhythm guitarist Mårten Hagström and the final to feature bassist Peter Nordin, the latter of whom left the band during the supporting tour due to vertigo.

== Legacy ==
Describing the record as "one of the 90's definitive metallic works", Kevin Stewart-Panko argues that Destroy Erase Improve's unique fusion of genres amounted to a new "watermark" for heavy metal upon its release. Metal critic Martin Popoff regards Destroy Erase Improve as the first clear demonstration of what would become the quintessential Meshuggah sound, wherein "stutter gun" riffs and "upset apple cart time signatures" are featured alongside "bone-breaking" percussion, an approach which resulted in considerable influence in the development of genres like mathcore and djent. Popoff suggests that Destroy Erase Improve is the clear linchpin of Meshuggah's particular style, a "specific, nearly absurd proposal that only this band has dared to own."

The album was ranked number 42 on Rolling Stone's 50 Greatest Prog Rock Albums of All Time list. In 2017, Rolling Stone ranked Destroy Erase Improve as 77th on their list of 'The 100 Greatest Metal Albums of All Time.' Two tracks from the album appear in the shockumentary film series Traces of Death with "Vanished" in the third installment and "Future Breed Machine" in the fourth.

== Track listing ==
All lyrics are written by Tomas Haake, except where noted; all music is composed by Fredrik Thordendal, except where noted.

No.	Title	Lyrics	Music	Length
1.	"Future Breed Machine"		(Note: Mårten Hagström revealed in an interview on November 30, 2025 that "Future Breed Machine" was written collaboratively by himself, Fredrik and Jens)	5:48
2.	"Beneath"			5:38
3.	"Soul Burn"		Haake; Thordendal	5:17
4.	"Transfixion"		Hagström; Thordendal	3:33
5.	"Vanished"			5:04
6.	"Acrid Placidity"	(instrumental)	Hagström	3:16
7.	"Inside What's Within Behind"		Kidman; Thordendal	4:30
8.	"Terminal Illusions"	Kidman		3:47
9.	"Suffer in Truth"	Kidman	Kidman	4:20
10.	"Sublevels"			5:14
Total length:				46:31

Japanese bonus tracks
No.	Title	Lyrics	Music	Length
11.	"Humiliative"		Kidman; Thordendal	5:15
12.	"Ritual"	Kidman	Kidman	6:15
13.	"Gods of Rapture"			4:55
Total length:				62:56

Re-release bonus tracks
No.	Title	Lyrics	Music	Length
11.	"Vanished" (demo)			5:34
12.	"Suffer in Truth" (demo)	Kidman	Kidman	4:19
13.	"Inside What's Within Behind" (demo)		Kidman; Thordendal	4:10
14.	"Gods of Rapture" (live)			4:53
15.	"Aztec Two-Step"		Meshuggah	10:43
Total length:				76:21

== Personnel ==
=== Meshuggah ===
- Jens Kidman – vocals
- Fredrik Thordendal – lead guitar, keyboards, backing vocals
- Mårten Hagström – rhythm guitar, backing vocals
- Tomas Haake – drums, voices (tracks 7, 9-10), backing vocals
- Peter Nordin – bass

=== Production ===
- Daniel Bergstrand – mixing, engineering, production
- Fredrik Thordendal – mixing
- Meshuggah – production, cover design
- Peter In De Betou – mastering (at Cutting Room, Stockholm)
- Stefan Gillbald – cover artwork

== Charts ==
Chart (2018)	Peak position
Swedish Albums (Sverigetopplistan)	43
