= Mårten Hagström =

Swedish guitarist

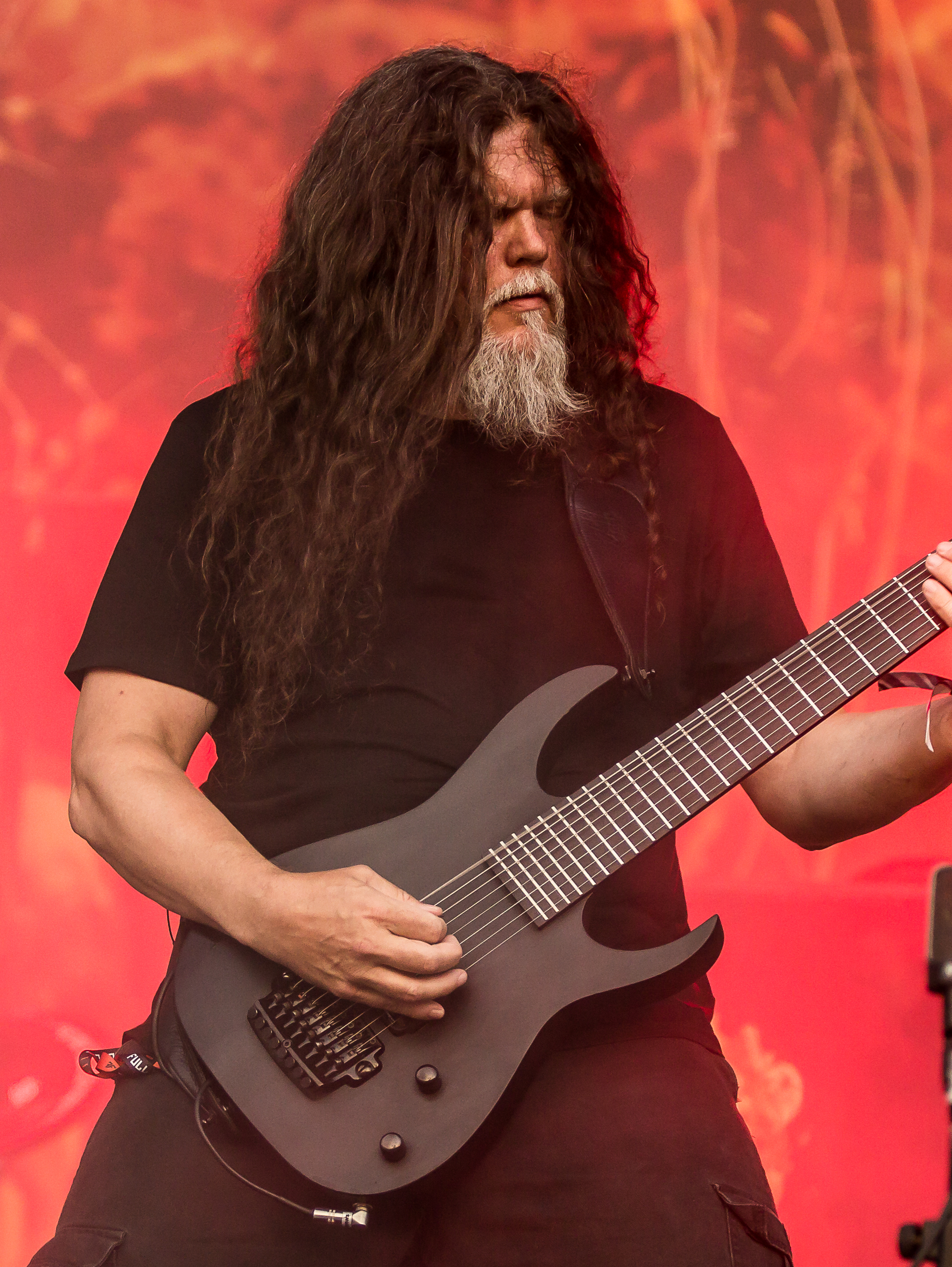
- Hagström in 2023

Background information
- Born: Mårten Hans Hagström; 27 April 1971 (age 55); Örnsköldsvik, Sweden
- Genres: Extreme metal, experimental metal, progressive metal
- Occupation: Musician
- Instrument: Guitar
- Member of: Meshuggah

Mårten Hans Hagström (born 27 April 1971) is a Swedish musician, best known as the rhythm guitarist for the extreme metal band Meshuggah.

== Career ==
Hagström joined the band after the release of their first album, which allowed Jens Kidman to focus on his vocal performances and give up rhythm guitar duties. Hagström and fellow Meshuggah guitarist Fredrik Thordendal are known for their complex rhythm guitar playing. Hagström has cited Rush, James Hetfield, Squarepusher, Autechre, Strapping Young Lad, and GISM as influences.

In a Metal Injection interview, he stated, "You can't play an instrument for the technicality of it. It's a tool you use to get what's in here and here [heart and mind] out there." He has also stated that when he first started learning guitar, the prevailing trend was for increasingly virtuosic lead playing, and that he decided to focus on developing his intricate rhythm guitar style instead.

Although Thordendal plays most of Meshuggah's guitar solos, the two of them share songwriting duties more or less equally, with Hagström notably contributing "Nebulous" from Nothing, "Acrid Placidity" from Destroy Erase Improve, and "Neurotica" from Chaosphere. Hagström has also stepped out of his role of playing exclusively rhythm guitar with the release of Meshuggah's obZen album by playing the slower, melodic leads on the songs that he wrote, such as "Electric Red" and "Pravus".

In addition to this, he has contributed lyrics to some of the band's later releases, co-writing Catch 33 with Meshuggah drummer Tomas Haake and penning the entirety of the words for their abstract EP I. Additionally, he has provided backing vocals for “The Faultless” from Immutable. Hagström and Haake have been playing music together since they were nine years old.

Hagström, along with Thordendal, was rated #35 by Guitar World in their top 100 of the greatest heavy metal guitarists of all time.

== Equipment ==
=== Guitars ===
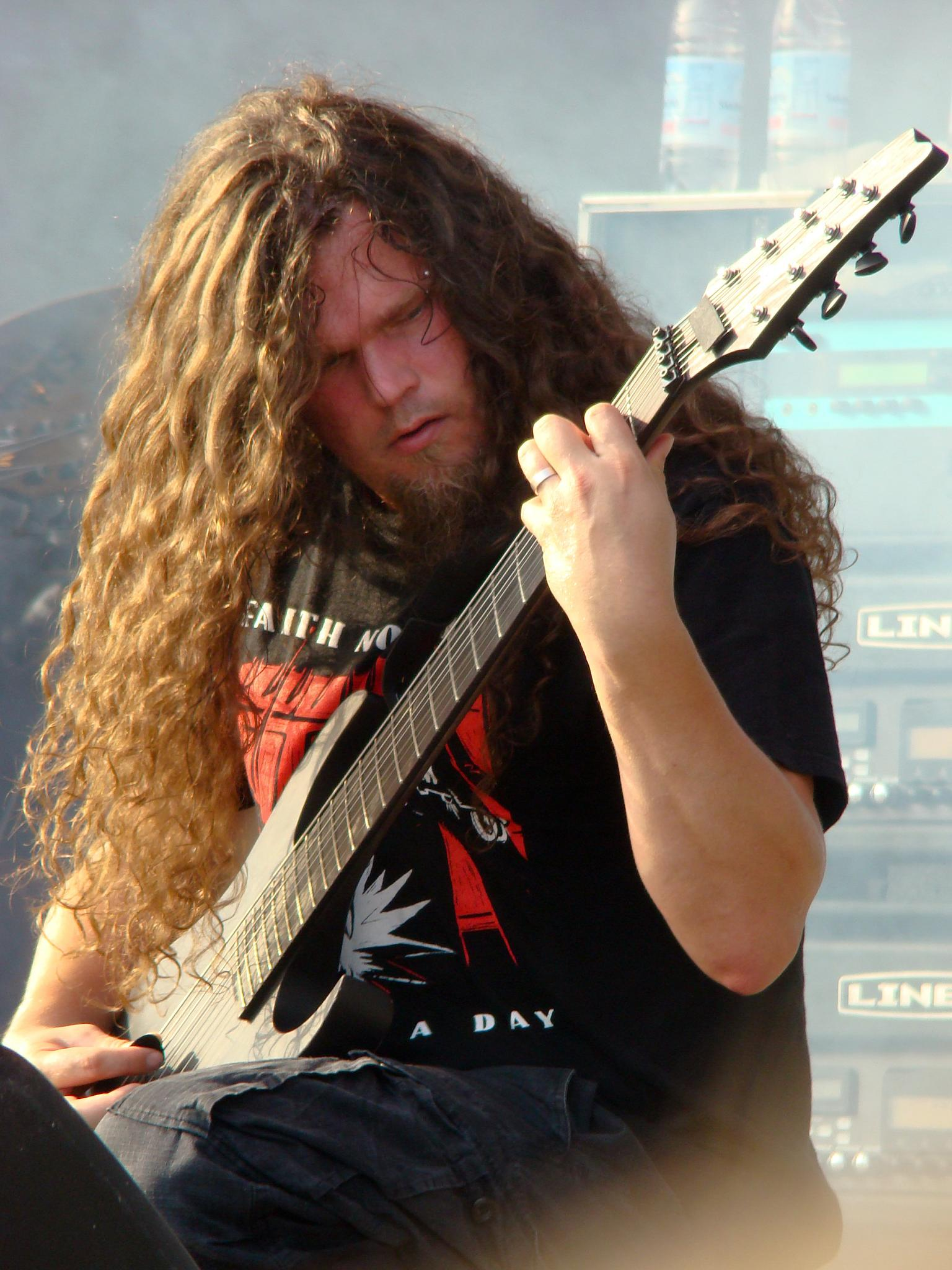
Hagström performing in 2008

Hagström's main guitar is an Ibanez Custom 8-String M8M which feature RG-shaped alder or Iceman-shaped swamp ash bodies with 5-piece maple/Bubinga neck-thru necks (29.4" {746.76 mm}), rosewood fingerboards (no inlays), fixed bridge (actually an Ibanez FX-Edge fixed tremolo), one volume, one tone, and one Lundgren Model 8 pickup. He uses .9-.70 gauge strings, tuned down half a step. Up until the late '90s, both Hagström and Thordendal used Ibanez 7-string guitars (initially Universe models, then single-pickup variations of the RG7620 and RG7621 for Thordendal and Hagström respectively) before moving to Nevborn 8-string guitars during the Nothing era. The group found the Nevborns to be somewhat unstable while touring and when Ibanez communicated a desire to try building them 8-string guitars they accepted the offer.

Marten Hagstrom got his custom 8 string to be modded to accommodate some arthritis issues to his shoulder. His new custom Ibanez M8M is 28" scale length with semi-hollow body facilitated easy stage performance and studio recording. He also got a production model 27" scale guitar (Ibanez Iron Label ARZIR28 8 String) for the other half of the stage time.

Guitar Strings:
DR Strings, Tite-Fit, LH-9 "Lite & Heavy" set: [.009 – .011 – .016 – .026 – .036 – .046], .052, .070 (stock gauges on the Ibanez M8M signature guitar)

DR Strings, Tite-Fit, TF8-10 "8 String Medium" set: .010 – .013 – .017 – .026 – .036 – .046 – .056 – .075

Guitar Picks:
Jim Dunlop 1 mm Nylon Standard

=== Amplifiers and effects ===
- Fortin Amplifiers "Meshuggah" custom amplifier heads
- Fractal Audio Axe-Fx Ultra (as of the obZen tour)
- Line 6 Vetta II Head Units
- T.C. Electronic effects
- Mesa Boogie .50 Calibre (None era)
- Mesa Boogie Dual Rectifier (Destroy Erase Improve and Chaosphere era)
- Line 6 Pod Pro (Nothing, I and Catch Thirtythree era)
