= Fredrik Thordendal =

Swedish guitarist

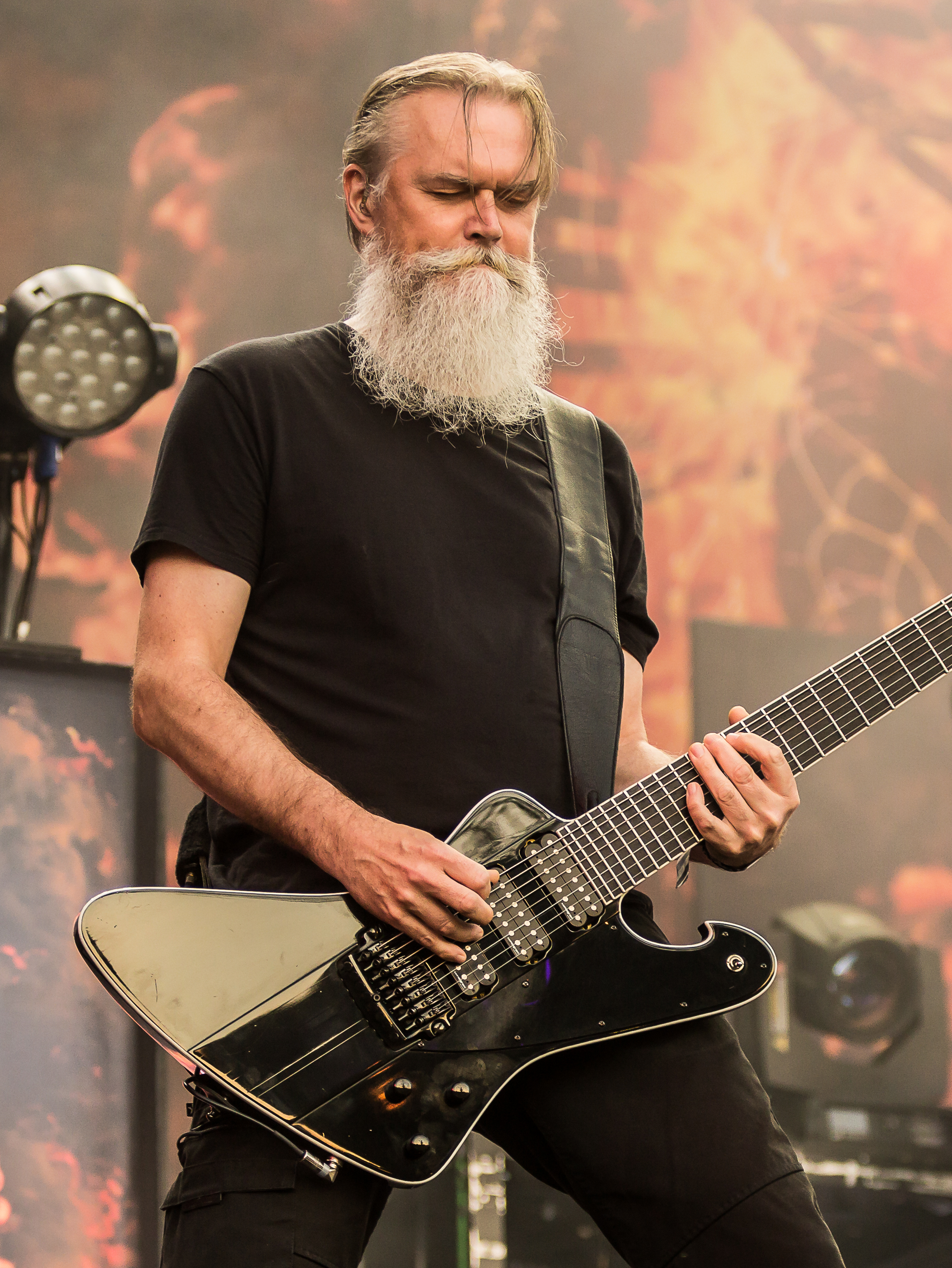
- Thordendal performing in 2023

Background information
- Born: 11 February 1970 (age 56)
- Origin: Umeå, Sweden
- Genres: Djent; experimental metal; extreme metal; progressive metal; jazz fusion
- Occupations: Musician, songwriter
- Instrument: Guitar
- Member of: Meshuggah

Fredrik Carl Thordendal (born 11 February 1970) is a Swedish musician best known as the lead guitarist for the extreme metal band Meshuggah, of which he is a founding member. Along with Meshuggah's rhythm guitarist Mårten Hagström, Thordendal was rated No. 35 by Guitar World in their list of the top 100 greatest heavy metal guitarists of all time.

== Career ==
=== Meshuggah ===
Thordendal began his career when he formed 'Metallien,' a heavily Metallica-influenced band, in his hometown of Umeå in 1985. The band later changed their name to Meshuggah and released their first LP, Psykisk Testbild, in 1989. Starting as a thrash metal band, Meshuggah's music gradually evolved into a more progressive sound. This sound has become influential to other bands, such as Periphery, whose core member, Misha Mansoor, was instrumental in coining the term "Djent" to refer to the commonly utilized technique of playing heavily muted, extended power chords, typically favoring the guitar's lower register, found in Meshuggah's music. Thordendal has been widely recognized in the metal community for his work with Meshuggah, as well as his iconic cult classic, Special Defects.

Sometime in the 90s, before the release of Destroy Erase Improve, Thordendal was involved in a carpentry accident at work in which he cut off the tip of his left middle finger. The fingertip was sewn back on, and after a significant amount of re-learning and practicing, he regained full proficiency on the guitar within a year or so.

=== Fredrik Thordendal's Special Defects: Sol Niger Within ===
Under the name Fredrik Thordendal's Special Defects, Thordendal released a solo album in 1997 titled Sol Niger Within with Ultimate Audio Entertainment. The album was remixed and re-released by Ultimate Audio Entertainment and Relapse Records in 1999 under the title Sol Niger Within Version 3.33. The re-release contains two bonus tracks but omits several parts of the original version. The newly mastered version of SNW was also released for the first time on vinyl in 2016 by Husaria Records, an American label specializing in audiophile releases. The album's original material was pressed in both a lacquer cut variant (500 units) and a Direct Metal Mastering variant (500 units). Thordendal also contributed to several tracks for drummer Morgan Ågren's Mats/Morgan Band, as he contributed to this album as the drummer and mandolin player.

Regarding a second Special Defects album, Thordendal states, "It's actually been messing with my head for years now. I haven't really found the time to get the project going. This is a project that I will work on for a longer time, with no rush whatsoever, to make it the best I possibly can. I'm looking forward to making it because I think it will sound so different from anything I've ever heard before."

=== Other projects and contributions ===
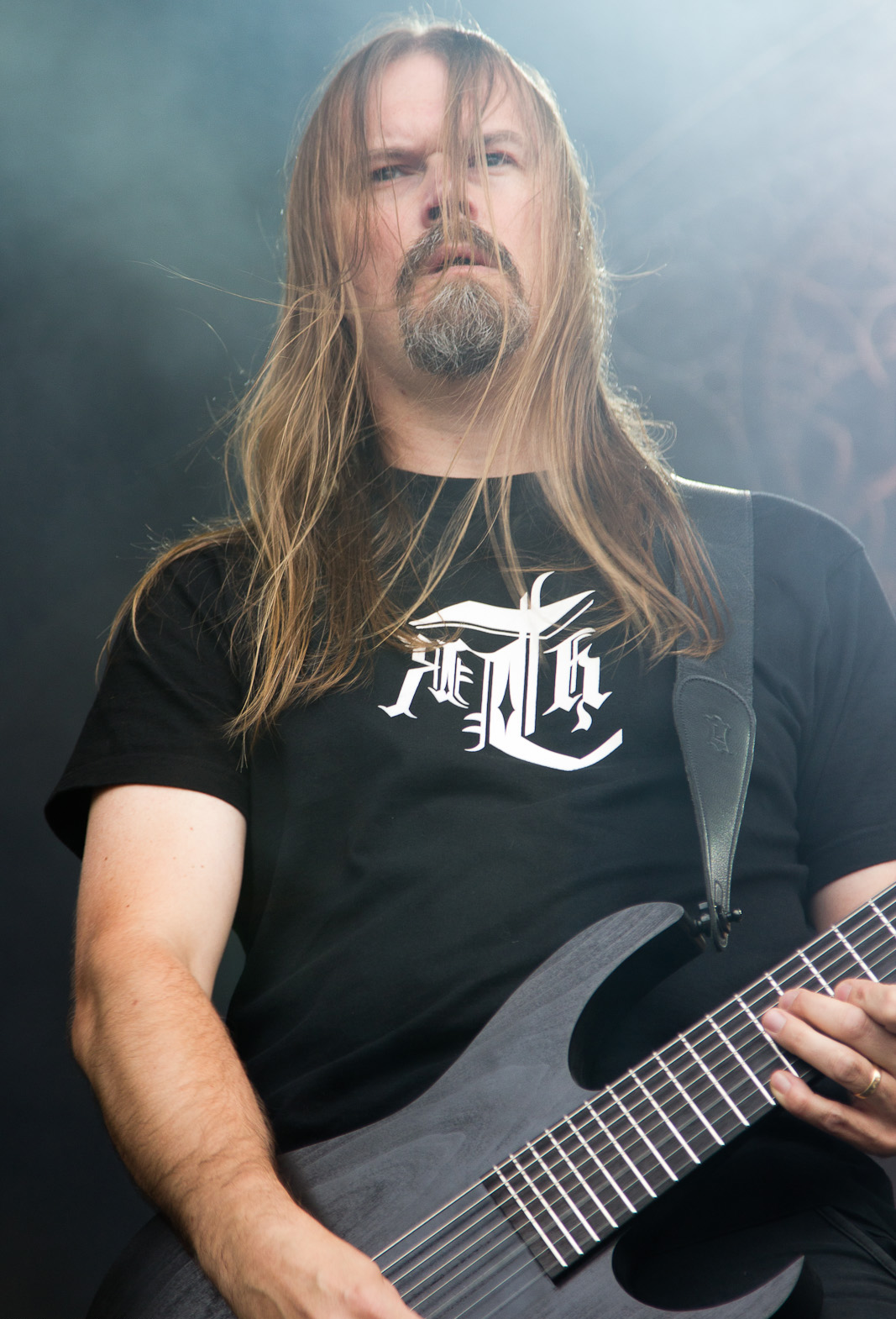
Thordendal performing in 2012

Thordendal has been involved in numerous side projects, such as XXX Atomic Toejam with Petter Marklund. The project initially released a 7" two-track single titled 'Celebration' under the name Sepülchre Inc. They later adopted the name XXX Atomic Toejam and issued an MCD entitled A Gathering of the Tribes for the First / Last Human Be-In on Cold Meat Industry, as well as featuring a track on the Karmanik Collection compilation. A full-length album was long announced but never materialized. Thordendal also played bass for Petter Marklund's solo project, Memorandum, and, together with Marklund, remixed tracks on the 1995 compilation album Ars Moriendi.

In 2010, Thordendal recorded some drum tracks with Morgan Ågren of the Swedish prog-rock band Kaipa and Dirk Verbeuren of Soilwork.

Several of Thordendal's demos have been released on the internet as MP3s or as videos on YouTube. Demo 33 was used to demonstrate a MIDI breath controller created by Johan Haake, which is used on several Meshuggah songs, including Future Breed Machine and Concatenation

Thordendal is also a notable producer, having produced all of Meshuggah's recent material as well as releases for various other bands, including Switzerland's Fragment.

Thordendal is featured in the Darkane track 'Psychic Pain' from the album Insanity, performing solo lead guitar. He also contributed to the song 'Asphyxiate,' which can be found on Scarve's album Irradiant. Additionally, he played a guitar solo on the title track of the Devin Townsend Project album Deconstruction.

He also contributed to the soundtracks of the video games Wolfenstein: The New Order, released 2014, and Wolfenstein II: The New Colossus, released 2017.

== Playing style and influences ==
As a guitarist, Thordendal stands out for his innovative and unhinged complex lead playing, inspired by jazz fusion guitarist Allan Holdsworth, and for his intricate rhythm playing, which often features prominent polymetric passages. These characteristics are further enhanced by his use of down-tuned seven- and especially eight-string guitars, vastly expanding the range he can access. He contributes significantly to songwriting and also provides backing vocals for some songs during live performances.

Thordendal has cited Metallica and Tool as influences on Meshuggah. Meshuggah supported Tool during their U.S. tour in the fall of 2002, where drummer Tomas Haake even made a guest appearance, playing 'Triad' with the band.

Thordendal has praised jazz fusion guitarist Wayne Krantz's work with Keith Carlock and Tim Lefebvre, stating that "these guys are the most inspiring band I've heard in a very long time." He has also mentioned that he listens to Massive Attack and Cult of Luna.

In a 2011 interview with Guitar World, Thordendal stated:

"My dad always listened to jazz, and I guess that influenced me to learn about improvisation. An improvised solo sounds so much better than a written one. For me, there's not much thinking going on at all, only a reaction to what I'm being told from the inside. And no, I have not had any formal training. When I record my leads, they are usually based on feel and totally ignorant of all laws of music theory. This, of course, is because I just play whatever comes out. There are no rules. But on certain songs, I do have to figure out what scales I need to use to follow chord changes. Since I'm not very good with all the scales, I sometimes have to write parts down and plan things ahead. I usually improvise the first part, then insert the written part, and continue to improvise until the end of the solo. It's a very confusing way to do it, but I do whatever it takes to make it sound like I know what I'm doing."

== Equipment ==
=== Guitars ===
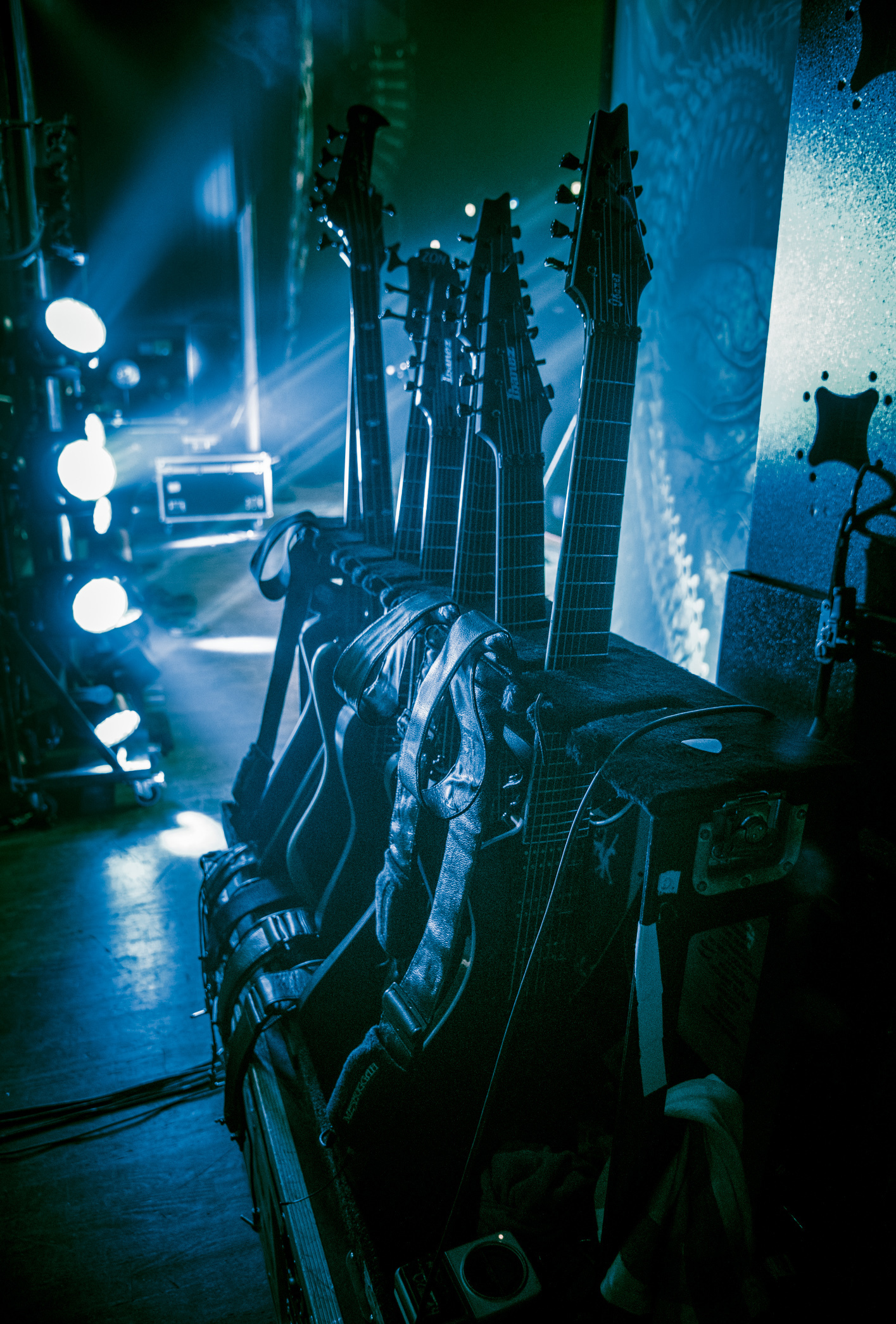
Meshuggah’s guitars used live 2016

Thordendal's current main guitars are custom Ibanez 8-string M8Ms, featuring RG-shaped or Iceman-shaped alder bodies with 5-piece maple/Bubinga neck-thru necks (29.4" ultra XL scale), rosewood fingerboards (with no inlays), floating bridges (essentially an Ibanez FX-Edge tremolo), one volume, one tone, and a Lundgren Meshuggah Signature 8-string pickup. Thordendal also owns a 7-string acoustic guitar, also made by Ibanez. For a time, he used Nevborn guitars, which made Meshuggah their first 8-string guitars, for their album Nothing (2002). However, these guitars suffered from intonation problems, leading Thordendal to abandon the company and switch exclusively to Ibanez guitars, which then led to I, the first song to ever be recorded on an eight string guitar in history. On the North American tour promoting Koloss, he used a custom Firebird, Iceman, and Explorer-type body 8-string, called the Stoneman. The Stoneman features a 27" scale length, which Thordendal prefers, as mentioned by his tech in an interview with Premier Guitar. This guitar is now in production under the name Ibanez FTM33.

Thordendal utilizes a unique device for his leads, referred to as a MIDI breath controller. He states, "I was mainly interested in using it as a dynamics controller. I wanted to start a note at a lower volume and then bring it up, like a saxophonist does. But I've since found that is more or less impossible with a guitar. Since the controller didn't produce the sound I was after, I had to find other ways of using it. It turned out that the only thing that sounded cool was when I blew every single note with it, which generated this weird staccato sound. The first breath controller we made—the one I used on 'Future Breed Machine' and 'Sublevels' from Destroy Erase Improve—could only control the volume. So Johan Haake and I tried all kinds of things to get closer to what I originally wanted, like adding control over frequencies and distortion. I am really pleased with how the 'Missing Time' solo turned out from Sol Niger Within Version 3.33 [the remix CD of the debut album from his side project Fredrik Thordendal's Special Defects]. But I never thought we got close enough, so I sort of gave up on it. A couple of years ago it was for sale to the public, but not any more".

Tuning:
For early Meshuggah releases, Thordendal tuned his 7-string guitars to B♭ (a half step below standard 7-string tuning). He continued this approach with 8-string guitars, tuning them down to F (F, B♭, E♭, A♭, D♭, G♭, B♭, E♭). In an interview, it was explained that they tuned their guitars this way because, in the early days of Meshuggah, before Jens Kidman adopted his signature vocal style, it was easier for him to sing in the key of E♭ or B♭.

Occasionally, Thordendal deviates from this "standard" tuning. For example, on songs like "Glints Collide," "Organic Shadows," "Perpetual Black Second," "The Hurt That Finds You First," and "Stengah," he tunes his 8-string guitar a half step lower to E. He also tunes it to E♭ for "Nebulous" and "Shed," and even down to D for "Obsidian." On "Spasm," he tunes the lowest string down to B♭ (B♭, B♭, E♭, A♭, D♭, G♭, B♭, E♭), making the 8th string an octave below the 7th. Additionally, "Mind's Mirrors" features the 8th string tuned down to E0.

Guitar strings:
DR Strings, Tite-Fit, LH-9 'Lite & Heavy' set: [.009 – .011 – .016 – .026 – .036 – .046], with additional gauges of .052 and .070. These are the stock string gauges on the Ibanez M8M signature guitar.

Guitar picks:
Jim Dunlop 1.3mm Primetone Standard with grip and Jim Dunlop 1.00mm Nylon Standard picks.

=== Amplifiers and effects ===
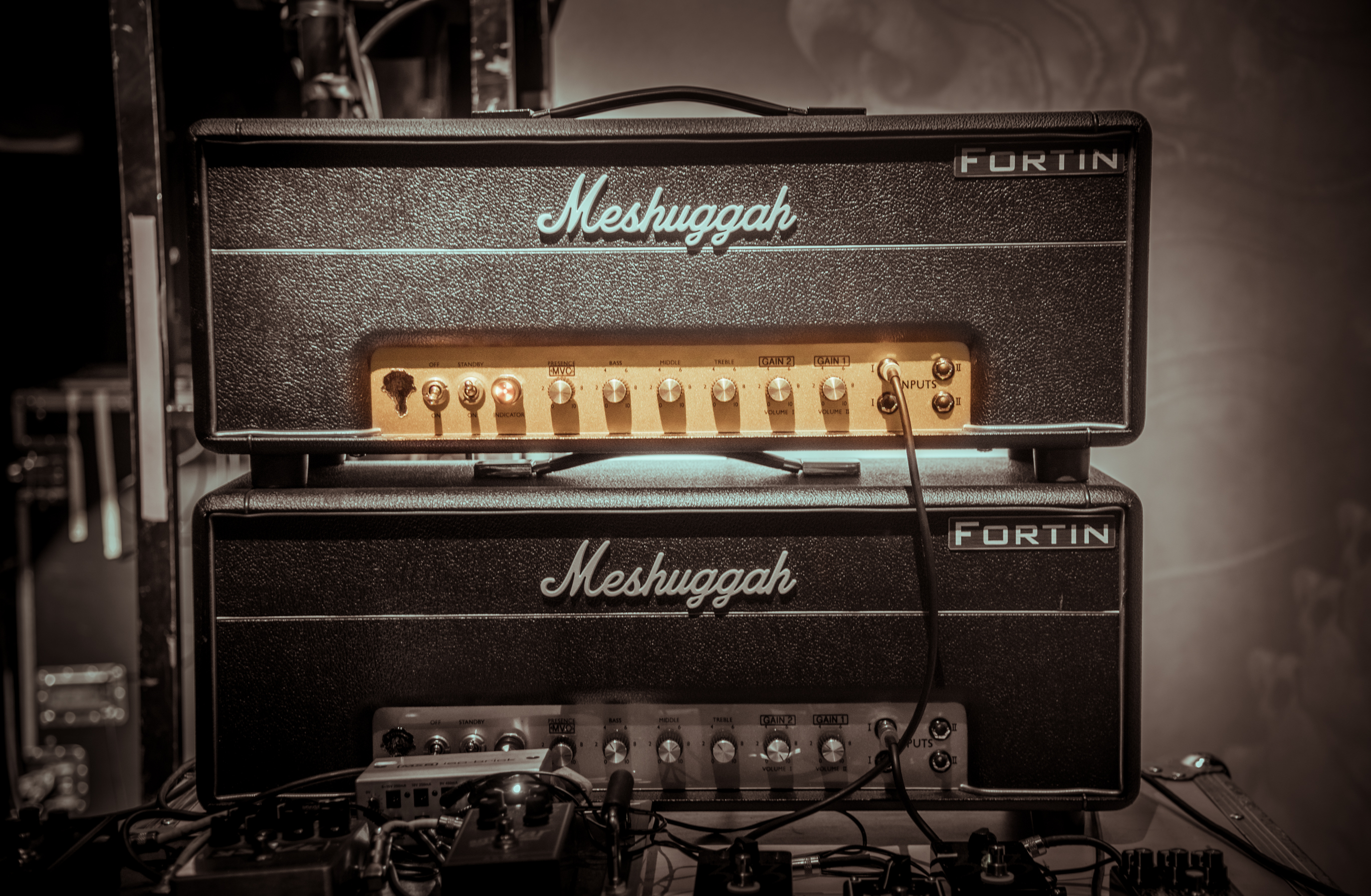
Custom-made amp by Mike Fortin, 2016

- Fractal Audio Systems Axe-FX II (used for all clean tones with effects and distorted guitar tones with effects)
- Fortin custom Meshuggah Amp (Single Channel, 50-Watt, no effects loop, custom-designed power transformers; ground-up custom build with turret board construction and point-to-point wiring; first used at the live show on 30 October 2016 in Toronto)
- Two Notes Torpedo Live
- Fortin custom boost pedal (black stompbox pedal with a '33' logo on it)

=== Amplifiers and effects used in the past ===
- Randall Satan (2016)
- Fractal Audio AxeFX ULTRA (2010–2016)
- Line 6 Vetta II Head Units (2005–2008)
- Line 6 POD Pro (2001–2005)
- Marshall Valvestate 8200 (1992–2001; for live use only)
- Mesa/Boogie .50 Caliber+ (1994)
- Mesa/Boogie Dual Rectifier (1995–2001; for studio use only)
- Marshall JCM800
- Marshall 1960A Cabinet
- Rocktron Juice Extractor
- TC Electronic Chorus & Flanger
- Homemade "Les Amp" Head Unit
- Homemade 1x12" Cabinet
- Yamaha Breath Controller
- Volume Unit (Yamaha BC controlled the amount of volume that the unit would allow through)
- ADA Rackmount Delay

== Discography ==
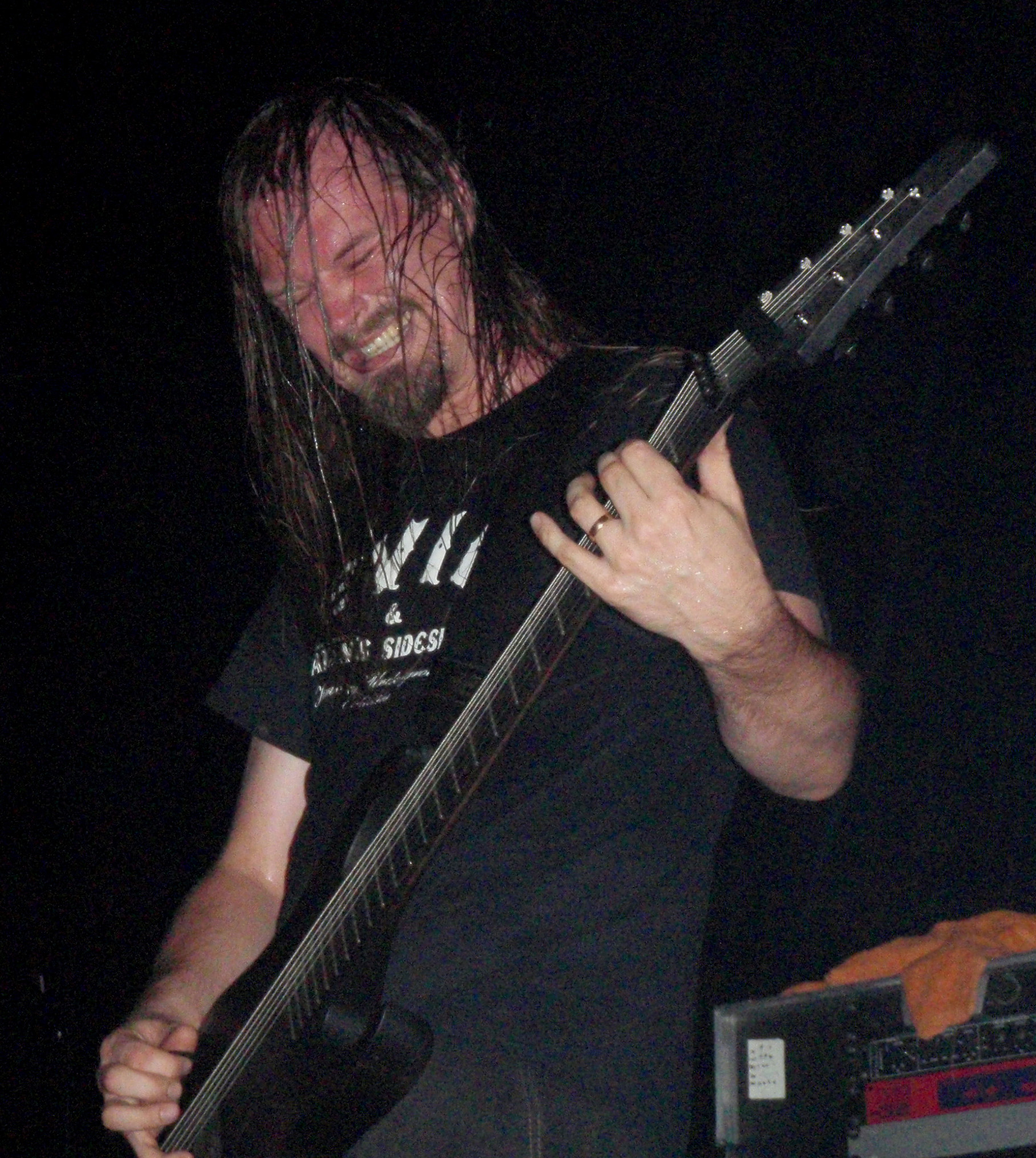
Thordendal with Meshuggah in 2008

Meshuggah

- Psykisk Testbild (EP, 1989)
- Contradictions Collapse (1991)
- None (EP, 1994)
- Selfcaged (EP, 1995)
- Destroy Erase Improve (1995)
- Chaosphere (1998)
- Nothing (2002)
- I (EP, 2004)
- Catch Thirty-Three (2005)
- Nothing – Re-issue (2006)
- obZen (2008)
- Alive (Live Album, 2010)
- Koloss (2012)
- Pitch Black (EP, 2013)
- The Violent Sleep of Reason (2016)
- Immutable (2022)

Fredrik Thordendal's Special Defects

- Sol Niger Within (1997)

The Devin Townsend Project

- Deconstruction (2011) (guest guitarist on "Deconstruction")

Gojira

- Untitled Sea Shepherd EP (TBA) (guest guitarist on "Of Blood and Salt")

Mattias Eklundh

- The Smorgasbord (2013) (guest guitarist on "Friedrichs Wahnbriefe")

Scarve

- Irradiant (2004) (guest solo guitarist on "Asphyxiate")

Mick Gordon

- Wolfenstein: The New Order (2014) (guest guitarist on "Herr Faust")

Grant the Sun

- Sylvain (2019) (bass guitarist)

Jakub Zytecki

- Nothing Lasts, Nothing's Lost (2019) (guest guitarist on "Creature Comfort")

Evan Marien

- Emar, Vol. 3 (2019) (guest guitarist on "Requiem")
