= Yes bubble logo =

Logo of the group Yes

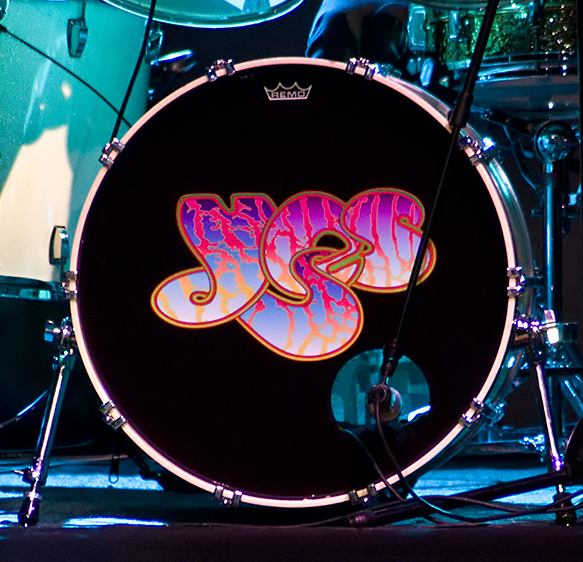
- Yes bubble logo
- Product type: Logo
- Produced by: Roger Dean
- Country: England
- Introduced: 8 September 1972; 54 years ago on the Yes album Close to the Edge
- Registered as a trademark in: United States Patent and Trademark Office; Registration Number: 1199922; Filing Date: 13 June 1980; Registration Date: 29 June 1982; Topographic Music, Inc.(registrant); Jon Anderson, Chris Squire and Alan White (last listed owners)

The Yes bubble logo, also known simply as the Yes logo, is a logo designed by the English artist Roger Dean for the progressive rock band Yes in 1971. The logo was first used on the Yes album Close to the Edge, when it was first released on 8 September 1972.

The original artwork for the logo is held in the Victoria and Albert Museum in London, and the MAK – Austrian Museum of Applied Arts in Vienna. The logo is listed in the NME's 64 of the Most Beautiful Band Logos.

The earlier Yes logo called the speech bubble logo was first used on Yes' self-titled debut album and last used in 1997 on their Something's Coming: The BBC Recordings 1969–1970 album.

== History ==
After Fragile, I felt Yes needed a logo and designed it without talking to them. For all I knew they weren't even going to come to me for the next album, but I still designed this logo. I did it over the course of a train journey to Brighton. I started with a notion that you can put these three letters together in an interesting way and by the time I got to Brighton, I'd pretty much done it. — Roger Dean

Dean graduated from the Royal College of Art in 1968 and trained as a furniture designer. He went on to design chairs, interiors and houses, including the "retreat pod" featured in the Stanley Kubrick movie A Clockwork Orange, and the seating for the club Upstairs @ Ronnie's at Ronnie Scott's Jazz Club, although he is best known as an album cover designer. Dean received a commission from Richard Branson to design a new logo for the newly formed Virgin Records in 1970. The Virgin Records logo, also known as the Gemini logo or the Virgin Twins logo, featured Siamese twins sitting by a tree with a long-tailed dragon by their feet. A variation of this logo was also used for Caroline Records, which was a subsidiary company of Virgin Records.

Dean's first work for Yes was to design the album cover for Fragile, that same year he also designed the bubble logo for the band's next studio album, Close to the Edge. Dean came up with the logo without the band's knowledge and before they had started working on Close to the Edge. He sketched it out during a train journey from London to Brighton with the idea that the three letters could be put together "in an interesting way". Upon Dean's arrival in Brighton, he had finished it. He also began designing stage sets for the band in 1972, which mirrored the sleeve design on the album.

During a signing, someone asked me to do the Yes logo so I started to draw the square logo and he said 'no, no, no...I want the famous logo, the bubble logo.' Well, I told him, 'I can't remember how to do it.' The truth is, I only ever drew things once. I had done six sketches of it, to get it right, but I only ever drew it once! — Roger Dean

The original drawings of the bubble logo were first exhibited in London's Design Centre and since then they have been housed permanently in a collection at the Victoria and Albert Museum in London.

== Accolades ==
The bubble logo has been recognised by:

- NME in the 64 of the Most Beautiful Band Logos at number 3.
- Ultimate Classic Rock as one of the Best Band Logos (in no order).
- Tailor Brands as one of The Best Band Logos in History at number 6.

== The bubble logo usage ==
=== Yes albums with the bubble logo ===
- Close to the Edge
- Yessongs and Yessongs 40th Anniversary Special Edition (bubble logo included in the Yessongs logotype)
- Tales from Topographic Oceans
- Yesterdays (bubble logo included in the Yesterdays logotype)
- Relayer
- Going for the One
- Tormato
- Drama
- Yesshows (bubble logo included in the Yesshows logotype)
- Classic Yes
- Union
- Yesyears (bubble logo included in the Yesyears logotype)
- Keys to Ascension
- Keys to Ascension 2
- Open Your Eyes
- Highlights: The Very Best of Yes
- Keys to Ascension Volumes 1 and 2
- Keystudio
- In a Word: Yes (1969–)
- Symphonic Live
- Live at Montreux 2003
- Songs from Tsongas
- Yesspeak Live: The Director's Cut
- The Ultimate Yes: 35th Anniversary Collection
- The Word Is Live
- Magnification
- Essentially Yes
- Fly from Here
- In the Present – Live from Lyon
- Like It Is: Yes at the Bristol Hippodrome
- Heaven & Earth
- Union Live
- High Vibration
- The Studio Albums 1969–1987
- Progeny: Seven Shows from Seventy-Two
- Yesoteric (bootleg compilation)
- Like It Is: Yes at the Mesa Arts Center
- Topographic Drama – Live Across America
- Fly from Here – Return Trip
- The Steven Wilson Remixes
- From a Page
- Yes 50 Live
- The Royal Affair Tour: Live from Las Vegas
- The Quest
- Mirror to the Sky
- Aurora

== Earlier Yes logo ==
Yes speech bubble logo

The earlier 1969 Yes logo sometimes called the speech bubble logo was designed by Alan Fletcher and used through to 1972.

=== Yes discography with the speech bubble logo ===
- Yes (1969 album)
- Something's Coming: The BBC Recordings 1969–1970 (1997 album)
- "I've Seen All Good People" (1971 single)
- "Yours Is No Disgrace" (1971 single)
- "America" (1972 single)
- "And You and I" (1972 single).

== Other uses ==
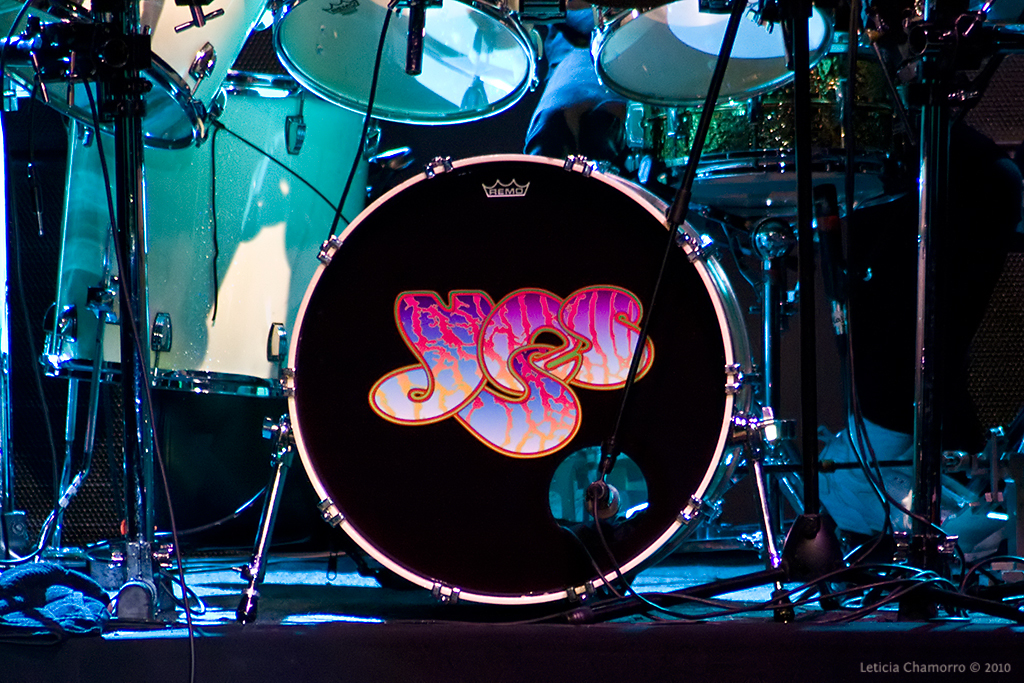
The Yes bubble logo on Alan White's bass drum

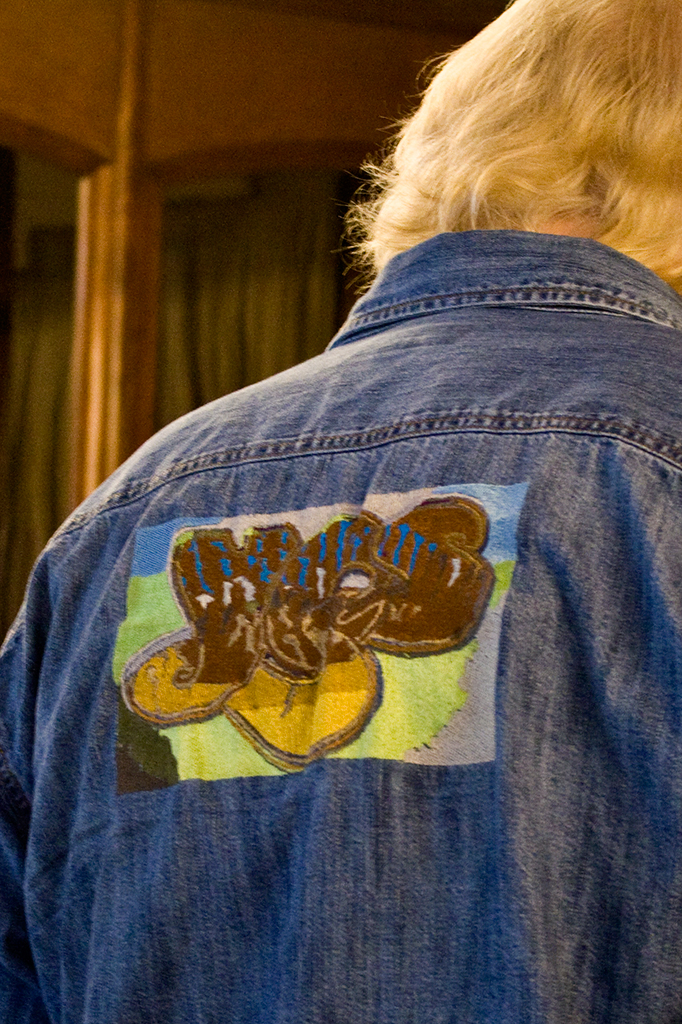
The Yes bubble logo on the back of Chris Squire's denim jacket

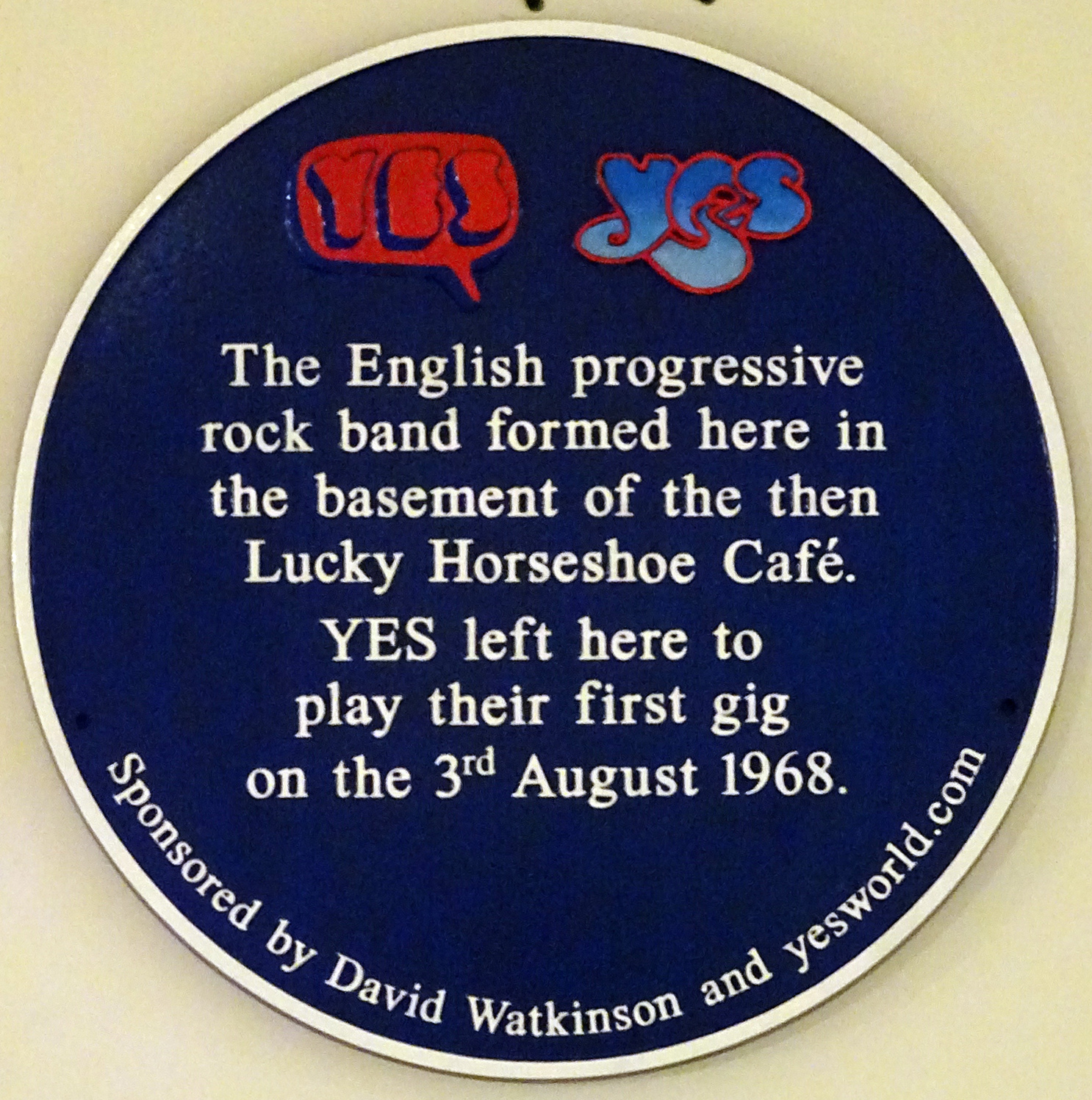
Both the speech bubble logo (left) and bubble logo (right) on the blue plaque where Yes was formed in the basement of the then Lucky Horseshoe Café in 1968.

== Further information ==
- Popoff, Martin (2016). Time And a Word: The Yes Story. Soundcheck Books LLP. p. 36. ISBN 978-0-9932120-2-4.
- Evans, Mike (2022). Vinyl: The Art of Making Records. Thunder Bay Press. p. 151. ISBN 978-1-64517-816-3.

== See also ==
- Tongue and lips logo, logo of The Rolling Stones
- Flying W logo, logo of Waylon Jennings
