= High Vibration =

Box set by Yes
- Released: 18 September 2013
- Recorded: 1968–1987
- Genres: Progressive rock; pop rock
- Label: Warner Japan

Yes chronology
In the Present – Live from Lyon (2011)	High Vibration (2013)	The Studio Albums 1969–1987 (2013)

High Vibration is a Japanese 16 SACD boxed set by English-prog rock band Yes, containing the first 12 studio albums released by Atlantic Records, the 1973 live album Yessongs, and a bonus disc. All of the discs are remastered by Isao Kikuchi, the SACDs are packaged like Mini-LP, similar to the Beatles box set The Beatles in Mono. The box set also features a 200-page book in Japanese. The box set has never been officially released outside of Japan.

== Contents ==
- Yes (1969)
- Time and a Word (1970)
- The Yes Album (1971)
- Fragile (1971)
- Close to the Edge (1972)
- Yessongs (1973)
- Tales from Topographic Oceans (1973)
- Relayer (1974)
- Going for the One (1977)
- Tormato (1978)
- Drama (1980)
- 90125 (1983)
- Big Generator (1987)

Bonus disc:

1. "Something's Coming" – 7:40
2. "Dear Father" – 3:11
3. "Roundabout (single edit)" – 3:27
4. "America" – 10:37
5. "Total Mass Retain (single version)" – 3:21
6. "Soon (single edit)" – 4:08
7. "Abilene" – 3:56
8. "Run Through the Light (single version)" – 4:31
9. "Run With the Fox" – 4:09
10. "Owner of a Lonely Heart (Move Yourself mix)" – 4:15
11. "Leave It (single remix)" – 3:56
12. "Big Generator (remix)" – 3:39

== Personnel ==
Yes

- Jon Anderson – lead vocals, percussion, acoustic guitars, piccolo, harp, 10-string Alvarez guitar
- Peter Banks – electric and acoustic guitars, backing vocals
- Chris Squire – bass, backing vocals, electric guitars, fretless bass, 8-string bass, bass pedals, backing vocals, piano
- Tony Kaye – organ, piano, Hammond organ, moog synthesizer, electric piano
- Bill Bruford – drums, vibraphone, percussion
- Steve Howe – electric and acoustic guitars, vachalia, vocals, steel guitar, lute, mandolin
- Rick Wakeman – Keyboards, Hammond organ, grand piano, RMI 368 Electra-Piano and Harpsichord, Mellotron, Minimoog synthesiser, harpsichord
- Alan White – drums, percussion, tuned percussion, glockenspiel, crotales, cymbals, bell tree, drum synthesizer, gongs, vibraphone, backing vocals, Fairlight CMI
- Patrick Moraz – piano, electric piano, Hammond organ, Minimoog, Mellotron
- Geoff Downes – keyboards, Fairlight CMI, vocoder
- Trevor Horn – lead vocals, fretless bass
- Trevor Rabin – guitars, keyboards, vocals, string arrangements
