= Highlights: The Very Best of Yes =

Compilation album by Yes
- Released: 21 September 1993 (US); 4 October 1993 (UK)
- Recorded: 1969–1987
- Genre: Progressive rock, Pop rock
- Length: 65:57
- Label: Atlantic
- Producer: Paul Clay; Tony Colton; Yes; Eddy Offord; Trevor Horn; Trevor Rabin; Paul DeVilliers; Yves Beauvais (exec.)

Yes chronology
Yesstory (1992)	Highlights: The Very Best of Yes (1993)	Talk (1994)

Professional ratings
Review scores
Source	Rating
Allmusic	4.5/5 stars

Highlights: The Very Best of Yes is the fourth compilation album by English progressive rock band Yes, released in September 1993 on Atlantic Records. It contains 12 tracks that span most of the group's history, from their debut album Yes (1969) to Big Generator (1987). The set reached gold certification by the Recording Industry Association of America for selling 500,000 copies in the US.

== Track listing ==
No.	Title	Writer(s)	Original album	Length
1.	"Survival"	Jon Anderson	Yes (1969)	6:18
2.	"Time and a Word"	Anderson, David Foster	Time and a Word (1970)	4:31
3.	"Starship Trooper" "Life Seeker" "Disillusion" "Würm"	Anderson, Chris Squire, Steve Howe	The Yes Album (1971)	9:26
4.	"I've Seen All Good People" "Your Move" "All Good People"	Anderson, Squire	The Yes Album	6:53
5.	"Roundabout"	Anderson, Howe	Fragile (1971)	8:31
6.	"Long Distance Runaround"	Anderson	Fragile	3:33
7.	"Soon" (single edit)	Anderson	Relayer (1974)	4:06
8.	"Wonderous Stories"	Anderson	Going for the One (1977)	3:45
9.	"Going for the One"	Anderson	Going for the One	5:32
10.	"Owner of a Lonely Heart"	Trevor Rabin, Anderson, Squire, Trevor Horn	90125 (1983)	4:27
11.	"Leave It"	Squire, Rabin, Horn	90125	4:10
12.	"Rhythm of Love"	Anderson, Squire, Rabin, Tony Kaye	Big Generator (1987)	4:45
Total length:				65:57

== Personnel ==
- Jon Anderson – lead vocals on all tracks
- Chris Squire – bass and backing vocals on all tracks
- Peter Banks – guitars on 1–2
- Steve Howe – guitars and backing vocals on 3–9
- Trevor Rabin – guitars, lead and backing vocals on 10–12
- Tony Kaye – keyboards on 1–4, 10–12
- Rick Wakeman – keyboards on 5–6, 8–9
- Patrick Moraz – keyboards on 7
- Bill Bruford – drums and percussion on 1–6
- Alan White – drums and percussion on 7–12

== Certifications ==
Region	Certification	Certified units/sales
United States (RIAA)	Gold	500,000^{^}
^{^} Shipments figures based on certification alone.
