= Be Well, Be Safe, Be Lucky... The Anthology =

Compilation album by Peter Banks
- Released: 9 March 2018
- Genre: Progressive rock
- Label: Peter Banks Musical Estate

Peter Banks chronology
The Self-Contained Trilogy (2018)	Be Well, Be Safe, Be Lucky... The Anthology (2018)

Be Well, Be Safe, Be Lucky... The Anthology is a compilation of solo and related work by the British guitarist Peter Banks, released by the Peter Banks Musical Estate in March 2018 on the fifth anniversary of Banks' death.

The release draws on Banks' solo releases – The Two Sides of, Instinct, Self-Contained, Reduction and Can I Play You Something? – with additional tracks from other projects, including the Yes tribute album Tales from Yesterday and the Flashback collaboration with Gerard Johnson. "Knights (Revisited)" is a previously unreleased track, based on an unfinished guitar track by Banks and completed posthumously by Tony Kaye, Billy Sherwood and Jay Schellen, who had all separately worked with Banks over the years.

== Track listing ==
CD 1—The Best of Peter Banks
No.	Title	Writer(s)	Length
1.	"No Place Like Home"	Peter Banks	1:41
2.	"All Points South"	Banks/Gerald Goff	6:34
3.	"Fogbound"	Banks	2:13
4.	"The Age of Distortion"	Banks	4:27
5.	"Knights"	Banks	6:14
6.	"Fade to Blue"	Banks	2:48
7.	"It's All Greek to Me – Oriental Bent"	Banks	5:12
8.	"It's All Greek to Me – In an Idyll Momentum"	Banks	1:29
9.	"Tone Down"	Banks	6:40
10.	"Dirty Little Secret"	Banks	3:48
11.	"As Ever"	Banks	1:55
12.	"Small Beginnings (Flashback Version)"	Banks/Colin Carter	3:10
13.	"Knights (Reprise)"	Banks	2:12
14.	"Massive Trouser Clearance"	Banks/Goff	7:17
15.	"Lost Days"	Banks	2:29

CD 2—Can I Play You Something More?
No.	Title	Writer(s)	Length
16.	"Can I Play You Something?"	Banks	0:15
17.	"Bang/Crash"	Banks	0:21
18.	"Peter Gunn Theme (live)"	Mancini	5:25
19.	"Hippee Loop"	Banks; based on a Mabel Greer's Toyshop sample	0:57
20.	"Warning: Rumble Strips"	Banks	6:22
21.	"Dancing Angel"	Banks	5:38
22.	"Lima Loop"	Banks	0:16
23.	"Astral Traveller"	Jon Anderson	7:00
24.	"Knights (Revisited)"	Banks	1:21
25.	"Yesterdays"	Banks	0:53
26.	"Endless Journey (Endless Version)"	Banks	5:56
27.	"Cinnamon Touch"	Banks	1:30
28.	"As Night Falls… and Continues…"	Banks	6:01
29.	"Small Beginnings (Epic Flashback Version)"	Banks/Carter	19:32
30.	"No Time"	Banks	2:24

== Personnel ==
Credits are adapted from the album's liner notes.

Musicians

- Peter Banks: guitar (1–11, 13–15, 20–1, 23–4, 28, 30), guitar synth (4, 6, 9–11), spoken word (16), all parts (12, 17, 22, 25–7, 29)
- Ray Bennett: bass (5)
- Mike Hough: drums (5)
- John Wetton: bass (13)
- Steve Hackett: guitar (13)
- Phil Collins: drums (13)
- Gerald Goff: keys (14)
- Gerard Johnson: spoken word (16)
- Greg Tupper: alto sax (18)
- Brad Stephenson: bass (18)
- Mark Craney: drums (18)
- Martin Briley: bass (20–1)
- Andy McCulloch: drums (20–1)
- Cecilia Quino: spoken word (22)
- Robert Berry: all other instruments (23)
- Tony Kaye: organ (24)
- Billy Sherwood: bass (24)
- Jay Schellen: drums (24)

Production

- Assembled by Johnson (4, 6, 9–11)
- Mixed by Johnson (12, 29), Mike Pietrini (24)
- Guitar parts engineered by Nick Cottam (24)
- Remastered by Pietrini
- Poem by Bill Ward
