= Rock of the '70s =

Video by Yes
- Released: 15 December 2009
- Genre: Progressive rock
- Length: 25 minutes
- Label: Voiceprint

Yes chronology
The Lost Broadcasts (2009)	Rock of the '70s (2009)	Union Live (2011)

Rock of the '70s is a Yes DVD released by Voiceprint on 15 December 2009. It contains Belgian promo material from September 1970. The music videos are synced with audio from the Time and a Word album. Peter Banks left the band before the album promo was shot. His replacement, Steve Howe, appears in this video. Brief interviews with band members are shown between each music video.

== Track listing ==
1. Astral Traveller 5:55
2. Everydays 6:25
3. Then 5:47
4. No Opportunity Necessary, No Experience Needed 4:49
5. Sweet Dreams (Credits) 3:46

== Personnel ==
- Jon Anderson - Vocals
- Peter Banks - Guitar (audio only)
- Bill Bruford - Drums
- Steve Howe - Guitar (footage only)
- Tony Kaye - Keyboards
- Chris Squire - Bass

Note: In the music video for "Then", Kaye and Squire switch instruments.
