= Flash (Flash album) =

Studio album by Flash
- Released: February 1972
- Recorded: 8–21 November 1971
- Studio: De Lane Lea Studios, London
- Genre: Progressive rock
- Length: 41:35
- Label: Sovereign
- Producer: Derek Lawrence

Flash chronology
Flash (1972)	In the Can (1972)

Singles from Flash
- 1. "Small Beginnings" Released: May 1972

Professional ratings
Review scores
Source	Rating
AllMusic	4/5 stars
Christgau's Record Guide	C−

Flash is the self-titled debut studio album by British band Flash, released in February 1972 by Sovereign Records, a subsidiary of Capitol Records. It reached the top-40 on the US national album charts.

== Background ==
Guitarist Peter Banks played with several bands before forming Flash, including The Nighthawks in 1963, The Devil's Disciples in 1964, The Syndicats in 1965 and then The Syn with Chris Squire on bass in 1965. He then joined Mabel Greer's Toyshop which would be the basis of Yes in 1966, again with Chris Squire, but briefly left to join a band called Neat Change and recorded a single, "I Lied to Aunty May"/"Sandman", with Peter Frampton playing guitar on side A while Banks played on side B. He then rejoined Mabel Greer's Toyshop, who became Yes. He left them after their second album, Time and a Word in 1970 to form Flash. Their bassist, Ray Bennett played with another band before Flash called The Breed which included Bill Bruford on drums.

== Chart performance and singles ==
Flash successfully reached the US pop album charts. It debuted on Billboard magazine's Top LP's & Tape chart in the issue dated May 20, 1972, peaking at No. 33 during a twenty-nine-week run on the chart. The album entered Cashbox magazine's Top 100 Albums chart in the issue dated May 27, 1972, peaking at No. 39 during a twenty-six-week run on it.

One lead single was taken from Flash. "Small Beginnings" was first released by Capitol Records as a single in early May 1972. It became a top-30 single on America's Billboard Hot 100 pop chart, rising to the number 29 position. Cashbox ranked it similarly at number 30 nationwide.

== Reissue ==
A remastered version was issued in the US in 2003. Curiously, it was coupled with their third album "Out Of Our Hands".

== Track listing ==
Side one
No.	Title	Writer(s)	Length
1.	"Small Beginnings"	Peter Banks, Colin Carter	9:23
2.	"Morning Haze"	Ray Bennett	4:32
3.	"Children of the Universe"	Bennett	8:55

Side two
No.	Title	Writer(s)	Length
4.	"Dreams of Heaven"	Banks, Carter	12:57
5.	"The Time It Takes"	Banks, Carter	5:48

== Charts ==
Chart peaks for Flash
Chart (1972)	Peak position
US Billboard Top LP's & Tape	33
US Cashbox Top 100 Albums	39

== Personnel ==
Flash

- Colin Carter – lead vocals, percussion
- Peter Banks – electric, acoustic and Spanish guitars, ARP synthesizer, backing vocals
- Ray Bennett – bass guitar, backing vocals; lead vocals and acoustic guitar on "Morning Haze"
- Mike Hough – drums, percussion, cymbals, voice

Additional personnel

- Tony Kaye – ARP synthesizer, Hammond organ, piano

== Production ==
- Derek Lawrence – producer
- Martin Birch – engineer
- Flash – arrangements
- Maurice Tate – artwork
- Barry Wentzell – photography
- Hipgnosis – design, photography
