= Crossover (David Cross and Peter Banks album) =

Studio album by David Cross and Peter Banks
- Released: 17 January 2020
- Recorded: 10 August 2010 (Cross and Banks session)
- Genre: Progressive rock
- Label: Noisy
- Producers: Tony Lowe, David Cross

Crossover is an album by former King Crimson violinist David Cross and former Yes guitarist Peter Banks. It is drawn largely from a single day of improvising by the duo that was polished later on.

== Production ==
Cross and Banks performed a series of violin and guitar improvisations on the afternoon of 10 August 2010. The two had met on a joint tour in 2006, featuring the David Cross Band and Peter Banks's Harmony in Diversity. Banks died in 2013 and Cross could not bring himself to return to the recordings for some time. When he finally did, he worked with producer Tony Lowe to polish and complete the material. In 2018/19 they invited various musicians with connections to Yes (including Tony Kaye, Oliver Wakeman, Billy Sherwood and Geoff Downes) and King Crimson (including Pat Mastelotto and Jeremy Stacey) to "interpret the music as freely and creatively" as they wished.

Additional material from the same session was released in 2026 as the mini-album The Other Horizon.

== Track listing ==
All tracks are written by David Cross and Peter Banks.

No.	Title	Length
1.	"Rock to a Hard Place"	9:12
2.	"Upshift"	8:21
3.	"The Smile Frequency"	5:17
4.	"The Work Within"	4:28
5.	"Missing Time"	4:10
6.	"Plasma Drive"	6:05
7.	"Laughing Strange"	7:23
8.	"Crossover"	4:40

== Personnel ==
- David Cross – violin
- Peter Banks – electric guitar, synthesizer guitar
- Geoff Downes – keyboards (1)
- Tony Kaye – Hammond B-3 organ (2, 7)
- Oliver Wakeman – Rhodes electric piano (2, 3, 6), grand piano (2), Moog synthesizers (2, 6), synthesizer (3), strings (6), electric organ (6)
- Tony Lowe – additional bass, keyboard and string parts
- Billy Sherwood – bass guitar (2, 6)
- Jeremy Stacey – drums (1, 7)
- Jay Schellen – drums (2)
- Pat Mastelotto – drums and electronics (6)
- Randy Raine-Reusch – "world instruments" (3)
- Andy Jackson – sound effects (4)

=== Production ===
- Produced by Tony Lowe & David Cross
- Adrian Benavides: sonic manipulation (6)
- Mastered by Mike Pietrini
- Artwork by Michael Inns

== See also ==
- List of 2020 albums
