= Yesterdays (Yes album) =

1975 compilation album by Yes

Compilation album by Yes
- Released: 28 February 1975
- Recorded: 1969–1970, 1972
- Studios: Advision, London
- Genre: Progressive rock
- Length: 44:50
- Label: Atlantic
- Producers: Paul Clay; Tony Colton; Yes; Eddie Offord

Yes chronology
Relayer (1974)	Yesterdays (1975)	Going for the One (1977)

Professional ratings
Review scores
Source	Rating
AllMusic	3/5 stars
Rolling Stone	(not rated)
The Rolling Stone Album Guide	1/5 stars

Yesterdays is the first compilation album by the English progressive rock band Yes, released on 28 February 1975 on Atlantic Records. It consists of material previously recorded for the band's first two studio albums, Yes (1969) and Time and a Word (1970), "Dear Father" their 1970 B-side of the single "Sweet Dreams", and the full version of their cover of "America" by Simon & Garfunkel. "America" was previously unreleased on a Yes album having only been released on an Atlantic Records' sampler album The New Age of Atlantic in 1972 (the inner sleeve note that it was on that album's predecessor The Age of Atlantic is incorrect). Yesterdays is the last Yes album to feature cover artwork by Roger Dean until the 1980 album Drama.

== Track listing ==
Side one
No.	Title	Original release	Length
1.	"America"	The New Age of Atlantic, 1972	10:30
2.	"Looking Around"	Yes, 1969	3:58
3.	"Time and a Word"	Time and a Word, 1970	4:29
4.	"Sweet Dreams"	Time and a Word	3:46

Side two
No.	Title	Original release	Length
1.	"Then"	Time and a Word	5:42
2.	"Survival"	Yes	6:18
3.	"Astral Traveller"	Time and a Word	5:47
4.	"Dear Father"	B-side to "Sweet Dreams", 1970	4:20

== Personnel ==
- Jon Anderson – lead vocal, backing vocals, percussion
- Peter Banks – electric guitar (2–8)
- Steve Howe – electric guitar ("America")
- Chris Squire – bass guitar, backing vocals
- Tony Kaye – keyboards (2–8)
- Rick Wakeman – keyboards ("America")
- Bill Bruford – drums, percussion

== Charts ==
Chart (1975)	Peak position
Australian Albums (Kent Music Report)	31
Canada Top Albums/CDs (RPM)	13
Japanese Albums (Oricon)	72
UK Albums (Official Charts)	27
US Billboard 200	17
