= Two Sides of Peter Banks =

Studio album by Peter Banks
- Released: 21 August 1973
- Recorded: November 1972 – June 1973
- Studios: Advision Studios, London
- Genre: Progressive rock
- Length: 41:18

Peter Banks chronology
Out of Our Hands (with Flash) (1973)	Two Sides of Peter Banks (1973)	Instinct (1994)

Two Sides of Peter Banks is the debut album by ex-Yes, Flash, and Syn guitarist Peter Banks. The album was written and recorded with Dutch guitarist Jan Akkerman (of Focus), and features contributions from members of several other progressive rock bands, including Genesis (Phil Collins and Steve Hackett), King Crimson (John Wetton) and Flash (Ray Bennett and Mike Hough). Banks had previously been the guitarist of Yes, before being replaced by Steve Howe; after being fired from Yes in 1970 he formed Flash, which ran from 1971 till 1973.

== Overview ==
The album features a group of guest musicians, including Genesis' Phil Collins and Steve Hackett and King Crimson's John Wetton. The entire album was written and recorded with Jan Akkerman. The first six tracks make up a suite (early themes are recapitulated toward the end) ranging from acoustic duets ("Vision of the King") to full-blown instrumental progressive rock numbers ("Knights") that bear similarities with Steve Hackett's 1975 solo album, Voyage of the Acolyte. "Beyond the Loneliest Sea" was written by Akkerman, while "Stop That!" is an extended jam featuring Banks and Akkerman trading solos. The album is entirely instrumental with Banks primarily playing guitar and also playing synthesizers and electric piano.

== Track listing ==
Side one
No.	Title	Writer(s)	Length
1.	"Vision of the King"	Jan Akkerman, Peter Banks	1:25
2.	"The White House Vale": a. "On the Hill"; b. "Lord of the Dragon"	Banks	7:13
3.	"Knights": a. "The Falcon"; b. "The Bear"	Banks	6:53
4.	"Battles"	Akkerman, Banks	2:23
5.	"Knights" (reprise)	Banks	2:13
6.	"Last Eclipse"	Akkerman, Banks	2:28
Total length:			21:51

Side two
No.	Title	Writer(s)	Length
1.	"Beyond the Loneliest Sea"	Akkerman	3:04
2.	"Stop That!"	Akkerman, Banks	13:41
3.	"Get Out of My Fridge"	Akkerman, Banks	3:20
Total length:			20:05

== Personnel ==
Adapted from AllMusic.

- Peter Banks - electric and acoustic guitars, ARP synthesizer, Minimoog, fender rhodes piano, producer
- Jan Akkerman - electric guitar (A1, A4, A6, B2, B3) acoustic guitar (B1)
- Steve Hackett - electric guitar (A5)
- John Wetton (credited as John Whetton) - bass guitar (A5)
- Ray Bennett - bass guitar (A3, A4, A5, B2, B3)
- Mike Hough - drums (A3)
- Phil Collins - drums (A4, A5, B2, B3)
- Geoff Young - engineer
- Paul Northfield - assistant engineer
- Ben Nisbet - management
- Mark Powell - remastering coordination, research
- Phil Smee - package design
- Ben Wiseman - digital remastering
