= Union Live =

Live album by Yes
- Released: 6 January 2011 (1 DVD, 2 CD)
- Recorded: Various dates and locations, 1991
- Genre: Progressive rock
- Length: 194:00
- Label: Voiceprint; Gonzo Multimedia
- Producer: Yes

Yes chronology
Live at Montreux 2003 (2007)	Union Live (2011)	Fly from Here (2011)

Yes video chronology
Rock of the '70s (2009)	Union Live (2011)	In the Present – Live from Lyon (2011)

Union Live is a live album and video by English progressive rock band Yes, released in January 2011 on Voiceprint Records. It was originally released in three versions; a single DVD, a double CD, and a limited edition double CD and DVD set. The album and video were recorded in 1991 during their Union Tour, staged in support of their studio album Union (1991) and featured the group's eight-member formation.

The single DVD and double CD was recorded on 8 August 1991 at the Shoreline Amphitheatre in Mountain View, California. The limited edition set features additional content, including audience shot video of the 9 April and 9 May 1991 shows in Pensacola, Florida, and Denver, Colorado, respectively, plus audio tracks from shows in London and Burgettstown, Pennsylvania.

In 2021, Gonzo Multimedia re-released the concert as a double CD and DVD Set under the title Union 30 Live - Shoreline Amphiteatre - California (8 August 1991).

== Track listing ==
=== CD ===
Live at the Shoreline Amphitheatre, Mountain View, California on 8 August 1991.

CD1
No.	Title	Length
1.	"Intro/Firebird Suite"
2.	"Yours Is No Disgrace"
3.	"Rhythm of Love"
4.	"Heart of the Sunrise"
5.	"Clap"/"Mood for a Day"
6.	"Make It Easy"/"Owner of a Lonely Heart"
7.	"I've Seen All Good People": a. "Your Move"; b. "All Good People"

CD 2
No.	Title	Length
1.	"Solly's Beard"
2.	"Saving My Heart"
3.	"Whitefish"/"Amazing Grace"
4.	"Rick Wakeman Solo"
5.	"Awaken"
6.	"Roundabout"

=== DVD ===
Live at the Shoreline Amphitheatre, Mountain View, California on 8 August 1991.

No.	Title	Length
1.	"Intro/Firebird Suite"
2.	"Yours Is No Disgrace"
3.	"Rhythm of Love"
4.	"Heart of the Sunrise"
5.	"Clap"/"Mood for a Day"
6.	"Make It Easy"/"Owner of a Lonely Heart"
7.	"I've Seen All Good People": a. "Your Move"; b. "All Good People"
8.	"Solly's Beard"
9.	"Saving My Heart"
10.	"Whitefish"/"Amazing Grace"
11.	"Rick Wakeman Solo"
12.	"Awaken"
13.	"Roundabout"

=== Limited edition bonus DVD ===
Live at the Pensacola Civic Center, Pensacola, Florida on 9 April 1991.

No.	Title	Length
1.	"Firebird Suite"
2.	"Yours Is No Disgrace"
3.	"Rhythm of Love"
4.	"City of Love"
5.	"Heart of the Sunrise"
6.	"Leaves of Green"
7.	"Concerto in D"/"Clap"
8.	"Make It Easy"/"Owner of a Lonely Heart"
9.	"And You and I: a. "Cord of Life"; b. "Eclipse"; c. "The Preacher, the Teacher"; d. "Apocalypse"
10.	"Drum Duet"
11.	"Hold On"
12.	"Shock to the System"
13.	"Solly's Beard"
14.	"Changes"
15.	"Take the Water to the Mountain"
16.	"Soon"
17.	"Long Distance Runaround"
18.	"Whitefish"
19.	"Amazing Grace"
20.	"Lift Me Up"
21.	"Rick Wakeman solo"
22.	"Awaken"
23.	"Roundabout"
24.	"Starship Trooper: a. "Life Seeker"; b. "Disillusion"; c. "Würm"

Bootleg videos from Denver, Colorado, McNichols Sports Arena (a.k.a. Big Mac), 9 May 1991

1. Firebird Suite / Yours Is No Disgrace
2. Rhythm of Love
3. Shock to the System
4. Heart of the Sunrise
5. Clap / Mood for a Day
6. Make it Easy / Owner of a Lonely Heart
7. And You And I
8. Drum Duet
9. Hold On
10. I've Seen All Good People
11. Kaye solo / Changes
12. Solly's Beard
13. Long Distance Runaround
14. Whitefish / Amazing Grace
15. Lift Me Up
16. Wakeman solo
17. Awaken
18. Roundabout

Bonus audio 5.1 mixes
Shoreline Amphitheatre, Mountain View, California in the San Francisco Bay Area, 8 August 1991.

1. Shock to the System
2. And You And I
3. Lift Me Up

Bonus audio stereo tracks

1. Shock to the System
2. And You And I
  Above two tracks from London – Wembley Arena, 29 June 1991.
3. Drum Duet
4. Changes
  Above two tracks from Burgettstown, Pennsylvania, Star Lake Amphitheater, 24 July 1991.

== Personnel ==
- Jon Anderson – lead vocals, acoustic guitar, tambourine
- Steve Howe – guitar, backing vocals
- Trevor Rabin – guitar, lead vocals, backing vocals
- Tony Kaye – Hammond Organ, keyboards, sound effects
- Rick Wakeman – keyboards, synthesisers, percussion on "Your Move"
- Chris Squire – bass, backing vocals
- Alan White – acoustic drums, percussion
- Bill Bruford – electronic drums, percussion
