= Relayer =

1974 studio album by Yes

Studio album by Yes
- Released: 29 November 1974
- Recorded: 1974
- Studios: New Pipers, Virginia Water, Surrey
- Genres: Progressive rock; jazz fusion
- Length: 40:28
- Label: Atlantic
- Producers: Yes; Eddie Offord

Yes chronology
Tales from Topographic Oceans (1973)	Relayer (1974)	Yesterdays (1975)

Singles from Relayer
- 1. "Soon" Released: 8 January 1975 (US)

Relayer is the seventh studio album by the English progressive rock band Yes, released in the UK on 29 November 1974 and in the US on 5 December 1974 by Atlantic Records. Following the departure of keyboardist Rick Wakeman due to creative frustrations surrounding the band's previous double album Tales from Topographic Oceans (1973), Yes rehearsed as a four-piece in Buckinghamshire before deciding to record at bassist Chris Squire's home studio in Virginia Water, Surrey. Co-produced by the band and long-time engineer Eddy Offord, they auditioned several musicians, including Vangelis, before recruiting Swiss keyboardist Patrick Moraz of Refugee. This remains the only studio release to feature Moraz on keyboards.

Musically, the album features a more aggressive direction that integrates elements of jazz fusion and funk into the band's core progressive rock style. Following the structural format of Close to the Edge (1972), Relayer consists of three tracks: the side-long epic "The Gates of Delirium" on side one, and "Sound Chaser" and "To Be Over" on side two. Frontman Jon Anderson drew structural and thematic inspiration for "The Gates of Delirium" from Leo Tolstoy's literary work War and Peace, culminating in a chaotic battle sequence that incorporated found objects like metal pieces and scrapped car parts as percussion, followed by a gentle, soothing prayer for peace that was later released as a standalone single, "Soon". The album's visual aesthetic is anchored by its gatefold cover artwork, a minimalist pencil and watercolour design by Roger Dean.

Relayer received a mixed-to-positive reception from contemporary critics, though retrospective reviews widely celebrate its adventurous technical complexity. The album achieved strong commercial success, peaking at No. 4 on the UK Albums Chart and No. 5 on the US Billboard 200. The single edit of "Soon" was released in January 1975, and the band supported the album with an extensive tour across North America and the United Kingdom before entering a year-long hiatus. Relayer has since achieved gold certification from the Recording Industry Association of America (RIAA) for selling over 500,000 copies in the United States, and has been subject to multiple expanded audio remasters, including stereo and 5.1 surround sound mixes produced by Steven Wilson in 2014. Despite plans by the band to revive the album live in its entirety for the first time since 1975, these retrospective tours were ultimately cancelled or postponed.

== Background ==
In April 1974, the Yes line-up of singer Jon Anderson, bassist Chris Squire, guitarist Steve Howe, keyboardist Rick Wakeman, and drummer Alan White concluded their five-month transatlantic tour in support of their previous album, Tales from Topographic Oceans (1973). The album had been a commercial success, reaching number one in the UK for two weeks and becoming the first to be certified gold by the British Phonographic Industry based solely on pre-orders. Despite this success, Wakeman grew increasingly frustrated with the musical direction of the double album and, following the final tour dates in May 1974, informed the band of his decision to leave. His exit was made public on 8 June 1974, coinciding with the instant commercial success of his second solo album, Journey to the Centre of the Earth, which had recently topped the UK charts.

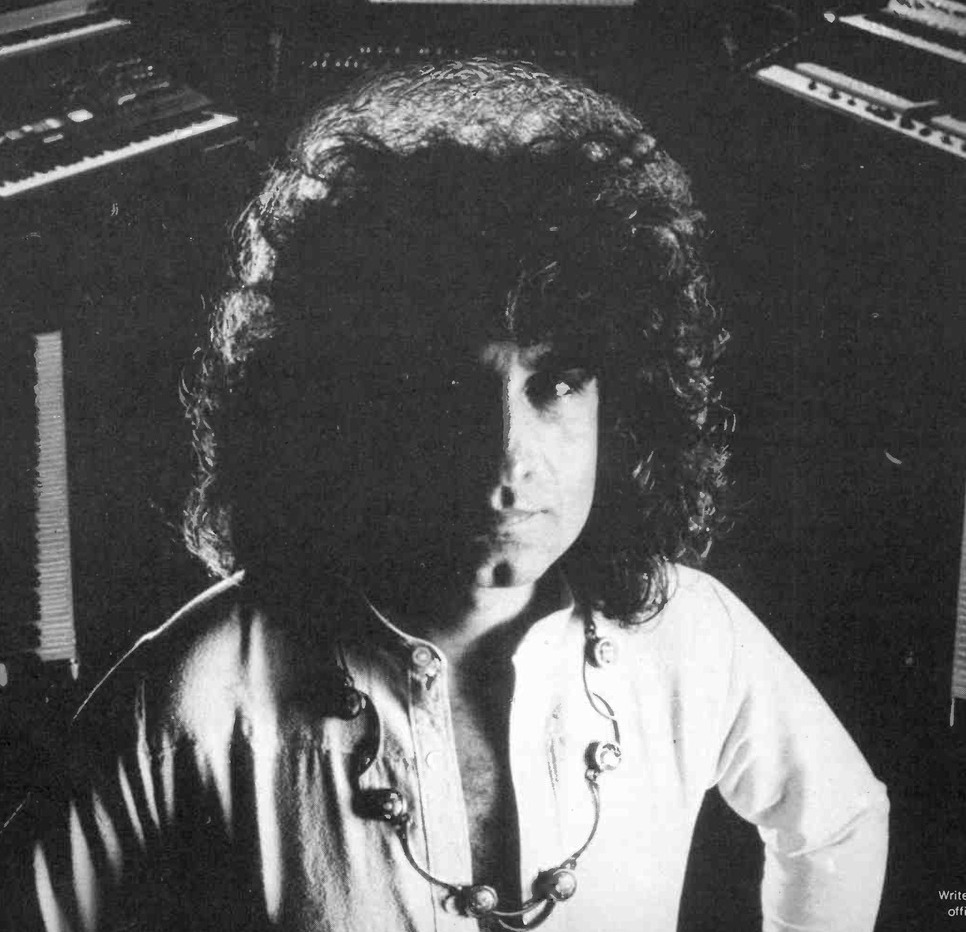
Patrick Moraz joined Yes in August 1974, replacing Rick Wakeman just before the recording sessions for Relayer. His background in jazz fusion influenced the album's complex arrangements.

Reduced to a four-piece, Yes retreated to Farmyard Studios, a rehearsal and recording facility owned by drummer Trevor Morais in Little Chalfont, Buckinghamshire, and worked on new songs. After some material had been arranged, auditions for a new keyboardist began and around eight players were invited, including Jean Roussel, Eddie Jobson, Nick Glennie-Smith, and Greek musician and composer Vangelis. Others were flown in from the US and Germany. Anderson was a fan of Vangelis and visited his Paris flat several months earlier when Yes were in town performing Tales from Topographic Oceans. Vangelis agreed to an audition and shipped his keyboards to the rehearsal studio, but the group discovered he was non-committal about the role and too strong a personality for a group. Atlantic Records vice president Phil Carson added that his fear of flying caused further complications, and a subsequent rejection from the Musicians Union ended the possibility of Vangelis joining the band. Melody Maker reporter Chris Welch suggested that the band try Patrick Moraz, a Swiss musician and film composer with a background in jazz and classical music, and a member of the progressive and jazz fusion trio Refugee. Within a week Moraz accepted an invitation from Brian Lane, the band's manager, to an audition. Moraz was a fan of the band and had met the original line-up in Switzerland in 1969.

Moraz arrived at Farmyard Studios in the first week of August 1974, and saw each band member arrive in his own expensive car. He said: "Coming from Refugee, where we had been walking three miles to and from our rehearsal place ... it was quite a contrast!" Vangelis's keyboards were still situated in the studio, and Moraz used them for his audition. After tuning up he played some parts to display his ability, including a short section of "And You and I" from Close to the Edge (1972), causing the band to stop talking and gather around him. Moraz's first task was to devise a section to complement what they had written for the middle section of "Sound Chaser". The band liked what he played, and on the following day, Lane informed Moraz that his audition was a success. Moraz accepted the offer, but felt some pressure to deliver, and drove from his flat in Earl's Court near central London to the studio each day to record and learn the band's repertoire.

== Writing and recording ==
Following the release of the 80-minute Tales from Topographic Oceans (1973), which featured a rigid musical structure, Anderson sought to explore "outrageously different" musical avenues on Relayer, and during this period, was influenced by the electronic music compositions of Karlheinz Stockhausen and Wings of the Delirious Demon (1972) by Turkish-American musician İlhan Mimaroğlu. Anderson recalled sharing a mutual desire with Moraz to create a "very modern" sound, though Anderson's further proposal that the band record completely unguided "free form music" was rejected by the other members as too radical.

Relayer shares the same structural framework as Close to the Edge (1972), comprising a single multi-part epic on side one and two shorter tracks on side two. Although the band composed two additional songs during the rehearsal period, they lacked the studio time required to record them; Anderson later described one of these unreleased tracks as highly intricate and complex. For most of his keyboard arrangements, Moraz relied entirely on his memory rather than transcribing his parts to paper, making exceptions only for particularly precise arrangements. Howe primarily played a 1955 Fender Telecaster for the album, marking a stylistic departure from the Gibson models he had favoured on previous releases; he also incorporated a pedal steel guitar and an electric sitar. Squire utilised a Fender Jazz Bass on "To Be Over", breaking away from his signature Rickenbacker 4001.

Following rehearsals at Farmyard Studios, the band decided to record Relayer at Squire's home, New Pipers, in Virginia Water, Surrey. Squire had purchased the property at Christmas 1972 and was converting the garage into a recording studio. This marked the first time Yes recorded an album outside of London; the location served as a cost-cutting measure that eliminated commercial studio fees and allowed the band more time to develop the music. They were joined by Eddy Offord, who had worked with the band since 1970 as their engineer, co-producer, and live sound mixer. Offord installed a 24-track recording machine and mixing desk that he had used with the band while on tour, which could be disassembled and stored in several flight cases. Genaro Rippo was enlisted as the tape operator. Relayer was the final Yes album with Offord before he left in mid-1975 to work with other artists. Though he later stated that his time with the band had become "a bit stale", he made brief returns during the recording of Drama (1980) and Union (1991). Recording sessions typically lasted eight or nine hours. Moraz wished Offord had been "a little less stoned" during the sessions, claiming it affected the album's production quality and ranking it inferior to Offord's work on Fragile (1971) and his albums with Emerson, Lake & Palmer. Mixing was completed at Advision Studios in London. (Note: Atlantic K 50096)

== Songs ==
=== Side one ===
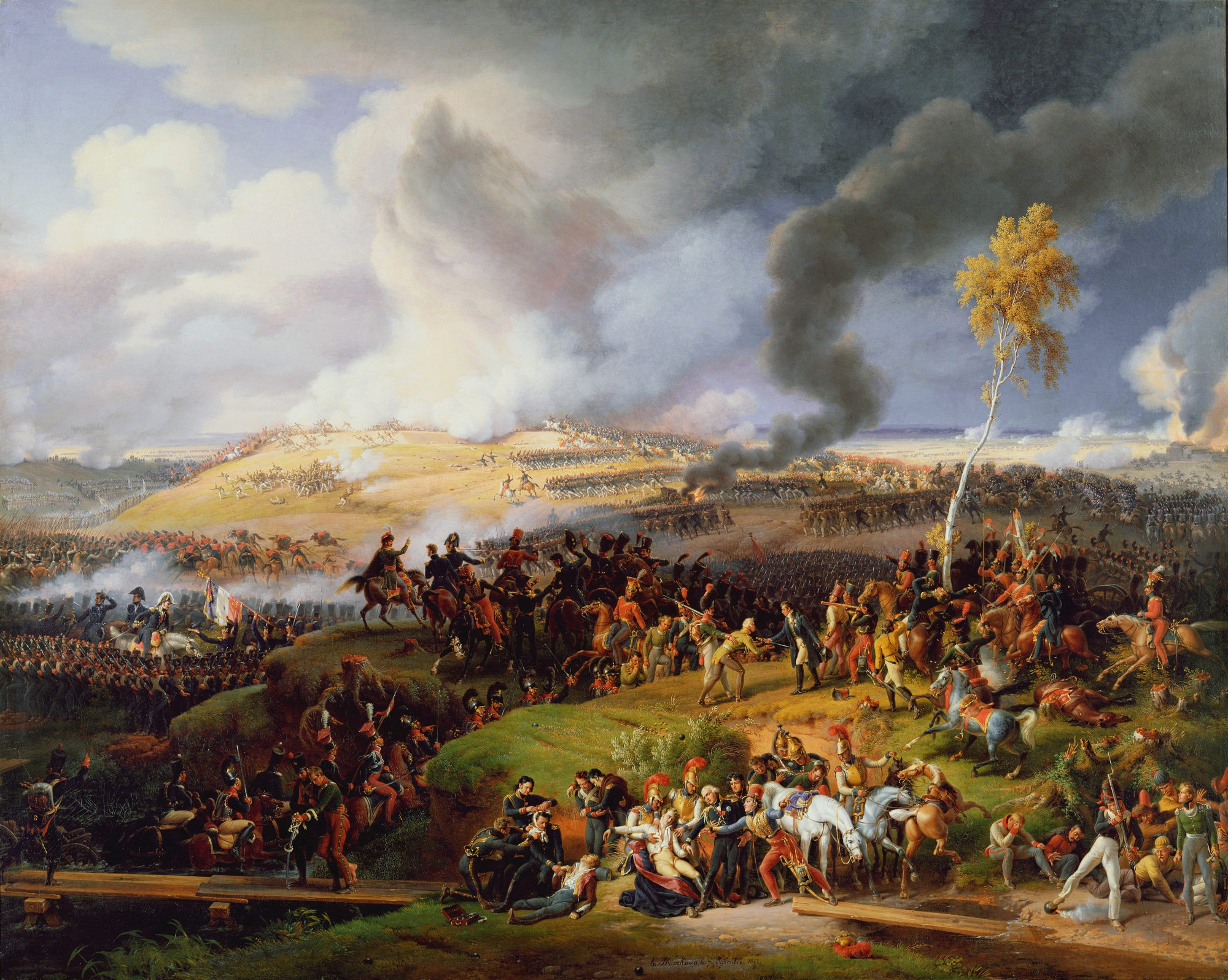
The 1812 Battle of Borodino, painted by Louis-François Lejeune. The track's instrumental battle sequence was loosely inspired by themes of warfare and its human cost in Leo Tolstoy's War and Peace.

"The Gates of Delirium" is a 21-minute track that Anderson described as "a war song, a battle scene, but it's not to explain war or denounce it ... There's a prelude, a charge, a victory tune, and peace at the end, with hope for the future." He originally planned to base the entire album on the literary work War and Peace by Leo Tolstoy, but instead opted for a side-long track inspired by its themes. Moraz recalled discussing the novel with Anderson, which prompted Moraz to present him with a copy of Délirius, a French science fiction graphic novel by Philippe Druillet. Moraz noted: "He related to it immediately so I think that perhaps as a title 'The Gates of Delirium' came from that".

The song originated from several short themes Anderson had amassed and played to the group on a piano; he was relieved when his bandmates understood his musical vision. Anderson and Howe tracked its structure by recording sections on cassette tapes, allowing the group to develop what was previously recorded while Anderson composed the subsequent parts. The track was recorded in sequential sections; though the group was familiar with the entire piece beforehand, they spent several weeks recording takes of each segment to select the strongest performances. Once chosen, these sections were edited together before overdubs were added.

The battle section features crashing sound effects created from metal pieces and used car parts that Anderson and White had collected from a scrap yard. After constructing a metal framework, the pair banged on the structure to produce heavy, percussive sounds, with White ultimately pushing over a tower of car parts to generate a massive crash. Howe recalled that Anderson became highly excited by his own vision for the battle sequence, which led the band to produce two distinct mixes: one that was "too far gone" and another that was "too safe". Following the battle's climax, the track concludes with a gentle melody that later became known as "Soon". Anderson stated that his lyrics for the section were addressed to God, asking Him to send light as a purpose for human existence. He later reflected that "The Gates of Delirium" did not translate as effectively on the studio recording, but noted that it fared significantly better when performed live in concert.

=== Side two ===
"Sound Chaser" represents a radical stylistic departure for the band, containing heavy elements of jazz fusion and funk arrangements. Moraz was asked to devise an introduction to the song during his audition; his contribution was finalised after "one or two takes" and used on the final version. He considered his Moog synthesizer solo at the end a highlight of his performance on the album, but felt that the keyboards overall were buried in the final mix. Howe described the track as "an indescribable mixture of Patrick's jazzy keyboards and my weird sort of flamenco electric [guitar]"; however, he disliked the chords Moraz initially played during the guitar solo, prompting a change that Moraz ultimately disagreed with. Yes biographer Dan Hedges compared the track to the style of jazz fusion group Return to Forever.

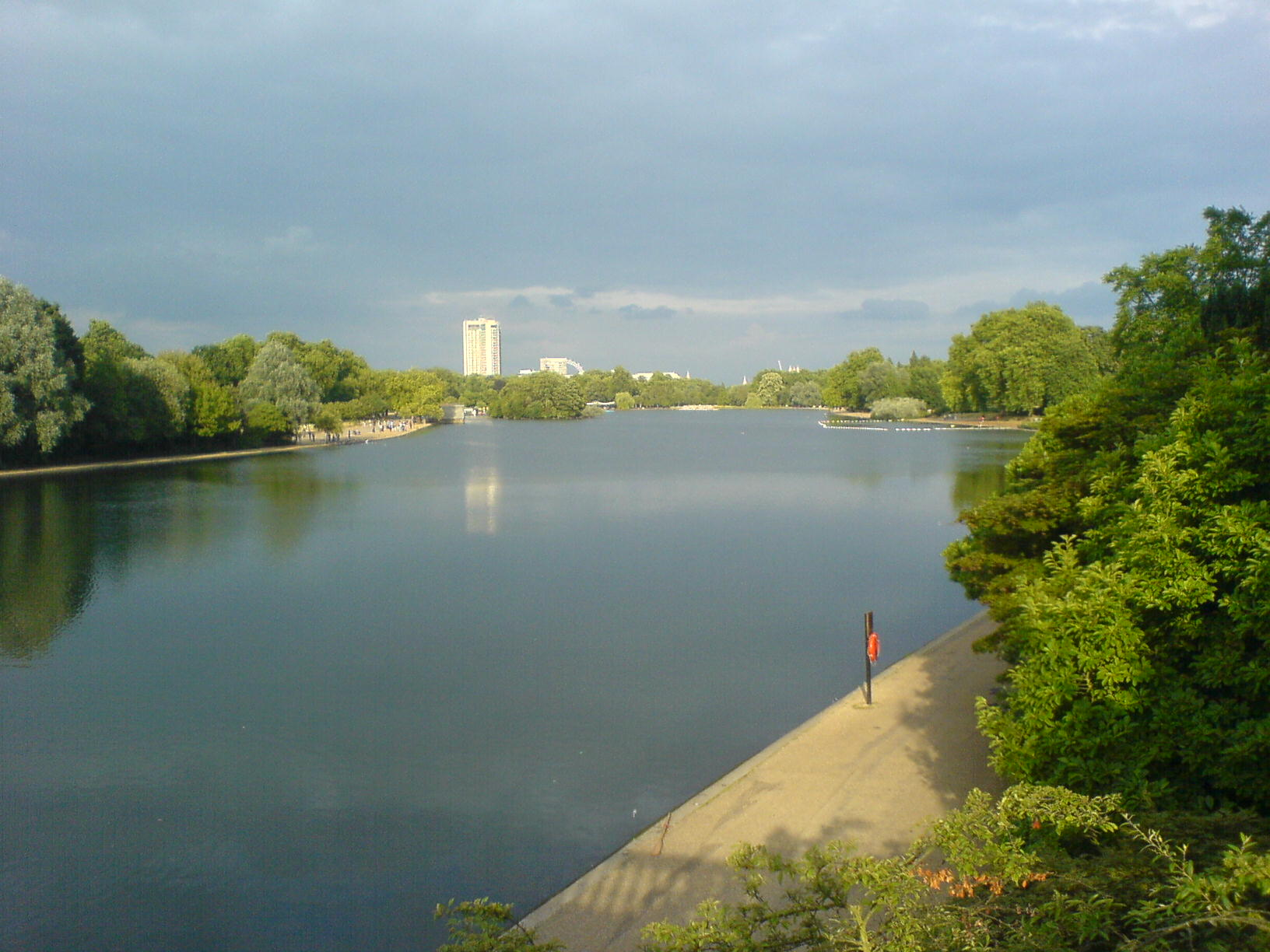
The Serpentine lake in Hyde Park, where guitarist Steve Howe conceived musical ideas for "To Be Over" during a boat ride.

"To Be Over" originated when Anderson spent an afternoon at Howe's house in London. As the two discussed what music to prepare for the album, Anderson told Howe of his fondness for a melody Howe had written and had sung to Anderson before. Anderson also had the initial lyric: "We'll go sailing down the stream tomorrow, floating down the universal stream, to be over". Howe gained inspiration for the track from a boat ride on The Serpentine lake in Hyde Park. From the beginning, he thought the song was "really special" and Anderson agreed to develop it further. Howe had come up with the music for this particular section in the late 1960s and took a riff from a track by his earlier group, Tomorrow. Anderson described "To Be Over" as "Strong in content, but mellow in overall attitude ... It's about how you should look after yourself when things go wrong." When the song's lyric was being finalised, Howe suggested having the line "She won't know what it means to me" follow "We go sailing down the calming streams", but Anderson changed it to "To be over, we will see", a change that Howe thought was "creatively disguised" to make a broader lyrical statement. Moraz felt restricted from performing an improvised keyboard solo for the song, so he wrote down a counterpoint solo "exactly like a classical fugue" to blend his keyboards with the guitar and bass. He had written an initial version on paper in an evening, yet the band expressed their wish to change the key of the song for the section, causing Moraz to spend several hours rewriting it overnight.

== Artwork ==
The album's sleeve was designed and illustrated by English artist Roger Dean, who had created artwork for the band since 1971, including their distinctive "bubble" logotype. In his 1975 book Views, Dean selected the cover as his personal favourite for Yes, and noted the recording as the one he enjoyed the most. Reflecting on the challenging design process, Dean recalled that it required a large amount of highly precise drawing utilising a minimalist colour palette finished with faint watercolour tints. The final image originated from a watercolour sketch Dean had completed in 1966 while studying at the Royal College of Art, which was one of the earliest entries in his sketchbook from that period.

Dean's conceptual intent for the sleeve design was to depict "a giant 'gothic' cave", which he described as "a sort of fortified city for military monks; a secret stronghold for a fantasy Knight's Templar." Speaking about his artistic methodology during the era, Dean stated that he strove to make his physical technique invisible so that the image could show through unimpaired, preferring to construct dimensional concepts and photograph them rather than draw them traditionally. Reflecting on the fantasy stronghold in 2004, he noted: "I was looking for the kinds of things like the Knight's Templar would have made or what you'd see in the movie Lord of the Rings. The curving, swirling cantilevers right into space."

The thematic narrative of the cover, particularly the warriors on horseback, mirrors the themes of warfare present in "The Gates of Delirium". Dean noted that Anderson chose the album title Relayer after looking at the painting and pointing out the messenger imagery among the riders. However, Dean strongly preferred the track title "The Gates of Delirium" due to its evocative nature, expressing that he never fully understood why the album was not named after it. Following forty years of pressure from fans, he subsequently released a limited-edition print of the artwork officially titled "The Gates of Delirium (Relayer)".

A separate drawing intended for the inside of the gatefold sleeve was ultimately left unused. It was titled "Happy Birthday" by Donald Lehmkuhl—who authored the poem featured on the final release. The completed sleeve features a band photograph taken by Patrick Moraz's former Mainhorse bandmate, Jean Ristori. The album's 2003 CD reissue features two additional paintings, and further unused designs are included in Dean's 2008 book Dragon's Dream. At the 1975 edition of the NME Awards, the album won the award for Best Dressed LP.

== Release ==
The album continued the band's commercial success during their 1970s progressive rock era, peaking at number 4 on the UK Albums Chart and number 5 on the US Billboard Top LPs & Tape chart. On 18 December 1974, less than two weeks after its American release, the album was certified gold by the Recording Industry Association of America (RIAA) for selling over 500,000 copies in the United States. The peaceful closing section of "The Gates of Delirium" was subsequently extracted and released as a standalone single, titled "Soon", on 8 January 1975. The single release featured an edited version of "Sound Chaser" as its B-side. (Note: The single was issued as Atlantic 45-3242.)

== Critical reception ==
Professional ratings
Review scores
Source	Rating
AllMusic	3/5 stars
The Daily Vault	B+
The Encyclopedia of Popular Music	2/5 stars
The Great Rock Discography	6/10
Pitchfork	5.3/10
Rolling Stone	(unfavourable)
The Rolling Stone Album Guide	4/5 stars

Relayer received a mostly positive reaction from music critics upon release. Music journalist Chris Welch gave the album high praise in Melody Maker, evaluating it as "one of the most successful and satisfying Yes albums". He described "The Gates of Delirium" as a powerful piece that benefited from the structural constraints imposed by a single-disc format, noting that the band was "at their best, creating tension and release with consummate ease, and preparing the way for Jon's crystalline vocals" as the battle sequence segued into "Soon". In its December 1974 review, Billboard called the album "another nearly flawless effort" by the band, noting that Moraz integrated into the lineup perfectly. The review concluded that the record stood as "one of the simpler, yet at the same time, one of the most workable sets the band has come up with." However, the album also drew criticism from contemporary detractors who viewed its technical density as a continuation of what they considered the overblown, pretentious traits of Tales from Topographic Oceans (1973).

Retrospective appraisals have remained generally positive, though divided over the album's intensity. AllMusic awarded the record three out of five stars, stating that Yes had "little incentive to curb their musical ambitiousness" and noting that the arrangements alternated between abrasive, instrument-heavy movements and delicate, spiritual vocal structures. In The New Rolling Stone Album Guide (2004), Ernesto Lechner described Relayer as "probably Yes' best opus", calling it a manic session that put the group's technical skill "at the service of a ferocious combination of free jazz and heavy metal." Conversely, reviewers for Pitchfork noted that while the album's complex execution made it a favourite among dedicated fans, general listeners might find the record to be noisy and hard to enjoy.

=== Band retrospective ===
Reflecting on the record, the band members held varied views on its unique style. Howe characterised the music as a "very modern, European style of music" enriched by the "South American flavour" that Moraz introduced, describing it as a highly international project. Squire felt that the performance interactions between his bass lines and White's drumming were superior to anything the rhythm section had recorded on previous Yes albums. While Moraz summarised the engineering process as loose but high-energy, former keyboardist Rick Wakeman expressed relief upon reviewing the album for the BBC and noted that he found the material "far too jazzy and freeform", which confirmed to him that he had made the correct decision to leave the band when he did.

== Reissues ==
Relayer was first released on CD in 1988, (Note: Atlantic 250 096 (Europe), Atlantic 19135-2 (United States)) with the mastering by Zal Schreiber at Atlantic Studios. A remastered CD by George Marino was released in 1994, (Note: Atlantic 82664-2) and in 1998, a "mini-sleeve" HDCD mastered by Isao Kikuchi was released exclusively in Japan. (Note: Atlantic AMCY-2738)

The album was digitally remastered in 2003 by Dan Hersch and Bill Inglot at DigiPrep for Rhino and Elektra Records. (Note: Rhino R2 73792) This version appended three bonus selections: the single edits of "Soon" and "Sound Chaser", along with a studio run-through of "The Gates of Delirium" featuring less prominent keyboard arrangements and alternative song structures. This edition was later included in the band's career-spanning box set, The Studio Albums 1969–1987 (2013). A subsequent Japanese market remaster was completed by Kikuchi in 2009. (Note: Rhino WPCR-75500)

In November 2014, Relayer was reissued in expanded CD/DVD-Audio and CD/Blu-ray configurations on the Panegyric label, featuring new stereo and 5.1 surround sound mixes produced by Steven Wilson. These packages featured bonus tracks, including an original master tape transfer and studio run-throughs of each song, while the Blu-ray iteration included a dedicated instrumental mix of the album. This mix does not include the physical sound effects heard in the middle battle section of "The Gates of Delirium" because they were absent from the original multi-track session master tapes. Wilson hypothesised that the crashing effects had been added directly during the final stereo mixdown from a separate tape loop source.

== Tour ==
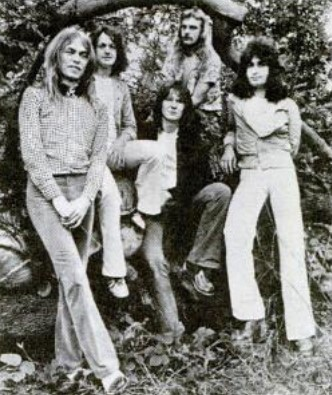
Promotional group photograph of Yes published in December 1974 during the opening North American leg of the tour.

Yes supported Relayer with their 1974–1975 tour of North America and the United Kingdom, which ran from 8 November 1974 to 23 August 1975 and featured the album played in its entirety. The tour culminated with a headlining performance at the 1975 Reading Festival, with the English progressive rock band Gryphon serving as the opening act for most dates. Rehearsals lasted for several weeks at Shepperton Studios in Surrey with Offord handling sound, stage lighting managed by long-time associate Michael Tait, and a stage set co-designed by Roger Dean and his brother Martyn.

The tour opened with a 31-date North American leg. Moraz had only six weeks to familiarise himself with the band's extensive live repertoire, utilising his 90-minute daily commute from London to Squire's home to study the material. Jean Ristori assisted by transcribing Yes compositions into handwritten "memory sheets" to help Moraz manage the technical complexity of his keyboard parts. While he relied on the sheets for the opening performances, Moraz had completely memorised the setlist by the time the tour reached Madison Square Garden in New York City less than two weeks later. Moraz recalled the Madison Square Garden show as a personal highlight, noting that the band received a standing ovation lasting several minutes. His live rig for the tour included 14 keyboards, doubling the setup he had used in Refugee. Future Yes lead vocalist and producer Trevor Horn attended a performance during the UK leg, later recalling that the concluding "Soon" section of "The Gates of Delirium" was moving enough to leave him close to tears.

=== 2020s cancelled revivals ===
Yes originally planned to revive the album live as part of their European Album Series Tour, intending to perform Relayer in its entirety. The dates were repeatedly disrupted; initial schedules were cancelled due to the COVID-19 pandemic, and subsequent 2022 reschedulings were bypassed when the band opted to celebrate the fiftieth anniversary of Close to the Edge instead. A rescheduled 2023 effort was postponed once more due to global touring insurance deficits involving war risk exemptions. The band eventually pivoted away from the concept, transitioning into The Classic Tales of Yes Tour and subsequent retrospective tours dedicated to Fragile (1971).

== Track listing ==
All tracks written by Yes.

Side one
No.	Title	Length
1.	"The Gates of Delirium"	21:55

Side two
No.	Title	Length
1.	"Sound Chaser"	9:25
2.	"To Be Over"	9:08
Total length:		40:28

Bonus tracks (2003 remaster)
No.	Title	Length
4.	"Soon" (single edit)	4:18
5.	"Sound Chaser" (single edit)	3:13
6.	"The Gates of Delirium" (studio run-through)	21:16
Total length:		69:15

Notes:

- Track durations are absent on the original UK vinyl, but were included on North American pressings.
- "Soon" is credited solely to Jon Anderson per BMI records. However, the track is credited to Yes as a whole on both the original single and the 2003 remaster of the album.

== Personnel ==
Credits are adapted from the 1974 UK album liner notes.

Yes

- Jon Anderson – lead vocals, acoustic guitars, piccolo, percussion
- Steve Howe – acoustic and electric guitars, pedal steel, electric sitar, backing vocals
- Chris Squire – bass guitar, backing vocals
- Patrick Moraz – piano, electric piano, Hammond organ, Minimoog, Mellotron
- Alan White – drums, percussion

Production

- Yes – production
- Eddy Offord – production, engineer
- Genaro Rippo – tape operator
- Roger Dean – cover design, illustration
- Mike Allinson – paste up
- Brian Lane – coordinator
- Jean Ristori – band photograph
- Mansell Litho – plates

== Charts ==
Chart (1974)	Peak position
Australian Albums (Kent Music Report)	15
Canada Top Albums/CDs (RPM)	22
Dutch Albums (Album Top 100)	10
French Albums (SNEP)	9
German Albums (Offizielle Top 100)	27
Italian Albums (Musica e Dischi)	17
Japanese Albums (Oricon)	37
Norwegian Albums (VG-lista)	18
UK Albums (Official Charts)	4
US Billboard 200	5

Chart (2014)	Peak position
UK Independent Albums (Official Charts)	19
UK Rock & Metal Albums (Official Charts)	11

== Certifications ==
Region	Certification	Certified units/sales
France (SNEP)	Gold	100,000^{*}
United States (RIAA)	Gold	500,000^{^}
^{*} Sales figures based on certification alone.^{^} Shipments figures based on certification alone.
