= Peter Banks =

English guitarist (1947–2013)

- Born: Peter William Brockbanks; 15 July 1947; Chipping Barnet, Hertfordshire, England
- Died: 7 March 2013 (aged 65) Chipping Barnet, London, England
- Genres: Progressive rock; rock; improvisation
- Occupation: Musician
- Instrument: Guitar
- Years active: 1963–2013
- Formerly of: The Nighthawks; The Devil's Disciples; The Syndicats; The Syn; Mabel Greer's Toyshop; Neat Change; Yes; Blodwyn Pig; Flash; Empire; Harmony in Diversity
- Website: peterbanks.net

Peter William Brockbanks (15 July 1947 – 7 March 2013), known professionally as Peter Banks, was an English guitarist. He was the original guitarist in the rock bands Yes, Flash, and Empire; he was also a guitarist for The Syn. Banks has been described as "the architect of progressive music".

== Early life ==
Peter William Brockbanks was born in Chipping Barnet in north London, on 15 July 1947, and raised in 37 Alston Road. His father William was an optical mechanic and his mother Ellen a cleaner. He attended Barnet Secondary School, followed by Barnet College of Further Education. Lonnie Donegan was Banks' first major musical influence and inspired him to take up the guitar at around 8 years of age. His parents bought him his records to listen to as well as his first guitar, an acoustic model which he later said "was practically unplayable". His first electric guitar was a Gretsch Tennessean. Banks studied art and once had an ambition of becoming a zookeeper, but decided against it when he learned the job had unfavourable hours, and pursued music. Banks also cited guitarist David O'List and Pete Townshend as an influence in his early period.

== Career ==
=== Early career and Yes ===
Banks started as rhythm guitarist in the Nighthawks, a local group, in 1963. His first gig took place at the New Barnet Pop Festival. In the following year he left to join the Devil's Disciples with John Tite on vocals, Ray Alford on bass, and Malcolm "Pinnie" Raye on drums. They recorded two covers on an acetate, Arthur Alexander's "You Better Move On" and Graham Gouldman's "For Your Love", which became a hit record for the Yardbirds one year later. It was Banks' first visit in a recording studio, during which he wore headphones and experienced stereo sound for the first time. He found the experience "totally terrifying", and was so traumatised that he started having doubts if he could carry on playing the guitar and work in another studio again. In 1965 Banks joined the freakbeat group the Syndicats, replacing guitarist Ray Fenwick.

After leaving the Syndicats, Banks joined the Syn which at the time included Chris Squire on bass, Andrew Pryce Jackman on keyboards, Steve Nardelli on vocals, and Gunnar Hákonarson on drums. They recorded two singles, "Created by Clive"/"Grounded" and "Flowerman"/"14 Hour Technicolour Dream", both in 1967, before they split. Later that year, Banks and Squire joined Mabel Greer's Toyshop with Clive Bayley on rhythm guitar and vocals and Bob Hagger on drums. In the spring of 1968 Banks left the band to join Neat Change, with whom he recorded one single, "I Lied to Aunty May". He was fired from the band after his bandmates wanted to adopt a skinhead look, and Banks refused to cut his hair. Meanwhile, Jon Anderson had joined Mabel Greer's Toyshop as lead vocalist, and Hagger was replaced by drummer Bill Bruford. The four entered a period of rehearsals in London, during which Banks replaced a departing Bayley and keyboardist Tony Kaye was brought in to round out the group.

While rehearsing with the new line-up, the band exchanged ideas for a name. Anderson suggested Life and Squire proposed World, but all agreed on Banks' suggestion of Yes, which he had thought of some time before. Following their debut in August 1968 Banks devised the band's first logo, a design featuring the group's name inside a speech bubble. Banks performed on the first two Yes albums, Yes (1969) and Time and a Word (1970). The latter features orchestral arrangements which Banks disagreed with, and he often clashed with producer Tony Colton. On 18 April 1970, Banks was fired from Yes after their gig at the Luton College of Technology, and was replaced by former Syndicats guitarist Steve Howe. In his autobiography, Howe wrote that Banks "was an interesting guitarist to have to follow. He, too, adopted different guitar styles and had already set a scene I could relate to. He was a sweet guy and came to many of our early gigs. I can't think of many other ex-band members doing that – I mean, right after they've left the band."

=== Post-Yes career ===
==== 1970s ====
Banks joined Blodwyn Pig for around six months in 1970, following the departure of original guitarist Mick Abrahams. He tried to incorporate more arrangements into their simple blues-oriented music, which he later realised did not fit and found his style incompatible. In later years, however, Banks looked back on this period as a particularly happy one and enjoyed working with his bandmates. After the band ran its course, Banks was unsure of his next move and later admitted that he was still "shell-shocked" by his departure from Yes, and turned to alcohol and drugs. He earned some money as a session musician, but found the work restrictive in a creative sense. At one point he was close to bankruptcy, and had to sell some of his equipment. Attempts to form a new band fell through, partly due to his disinterest in being a leader.

Banks' fortunes changed when music reporter Chris Welch wrote an article about him in Melody Maker in June 1971. The article was spotted by vocalist Colin Carter, who contacted Banks and invited him to form a band. Following the addition of bassist Ray Bennett and drummer Mike Hough, the four named themselves Flash and began touring in 1972. In the same year they released two albums, Flash and In the Can, to a warm reception. The group disbanded in 1973 towards the end of a US tour to promote their third album, Out of Our Hands. Banks felt the group lacked the right management, and got angry at Carter and Bennett for often playing with their backs to the audience. By this time Banks was a heavy drinker, addicted to valium, and unbeknownst to him until years later, was suffering from his first nervous breakdown.

In 1973 Banks recorded his debut solo album, Two Sides of Peter Banks. It was recorded at the same time as Out of Our Hands, with Banks working with Flash during the day and travelling to a different studio to work on his own at night. The album features guest appearances from Jan Akkerman of Focus, drummer Phil Collins and guitarist Steve Hackett of Genesis, and John Wetton of King Crimson. In the summer of 1973, Banks played in a short-lived band with Collins, guitarist Ronnie Caryl, violinist Mike Poggott, and bassist John Howitt named Zox and the Radar Boys.

While touring the US with Flash, Banks met his first wife Sidonie Jordan (known as Sidney Foxx). In 1974, they formed Empire and recorded three albums with various musicians until 1979, which remained unreleased until the 1990s. Amongst the musicians involved were Collins, Preston Heyman, bassist John Giblin, and keyboardist Jakob Magnusson. Ray Bennett of Flash was in the group for a period, but he and Banks did not get along and Banks caught Jordan having an affair with him. Empire disbanded in 1980, having only performed showcase gigs for record executives.

==== 1980s–1990s ====
Banks made a steady living in the 1980s and 1990s as a session musician in Los Angeles, which he enjoyed over time. In 1983, he played guitar on Lionel Richie's hit song "Hello". Banks played on various albums, including those by Lonnie Donegan and Jakob Frímann Magnússon, and appeared on Romeo Unchained (1986) by Tonio K. He also worked with Ian Wallace in the Teabags with Jackie Lomax, Kim Gardner, David Mansfield, and Mel Collins, although the group yielded no recordings.

In May 1991, Kaye invited Banks to play with Yes on stage during the encore at their show at the Great Western Forum, California. Banks accepted and went to the show, but Kaye informed him that Howe did not want Banks to play. An angered Banks proceeded to drink at the arena bar with comedian Billy Connolly. In 1994 and 1998, Banks was a featured guest at the Yes fan convention Yestival. He co-ordinated the release of the 1997 live compilation Something's Coming: The BBC Recordings 1969–1970, and wrote about his days with the band in the liner notes. Around this time, Banks and Geoff Downes played some sessions and the possibility of Banks joining Asia was mooted, but came to nothing. Banks was featured in the 2006 Yes documentary Classic Artists: Yes and the 2009 DVDs The Lost Broadcasts and Rock of the '70s.

After returning to London in the mid-1990s, Banks continued as a session musician and released archive material. He released three solo albums: the all-instrumental Instinct (1993), Self Contained (1995), which features Gerald Goff on keyboards, and Reduction (1997). Another archival release was Psychosync, a live Flash recording made in 1973 for the King Biscuit Flower Hour and finally released in 1998.

==== 2000s–2010s ====
In 2000, Banks put out a collection of his oldest recordings, many previously unreleased, called Can I Play You Something?. It features early recordings by The Syn, Mabel Greer's Toyshop and Yes.

In 2001, Banks published a book with co-author Billy James, entitled Beyond and Before: The Formative Years of Yes. In 2006, he expressed a desire to write a second book.

He was initially involved in a reunion of The Syn in 2003 and 2004, and recorded material with Steve Nardelli, Martyn Adleman, and Gerard Johnson. After several clashes over the recording, production and mixing, Banks was let go from the project, although he claimed he was never officially told. In a statement posted online, Banks called the behaviour of the three members "mystifying" and refuse to discuss the matter with him. Later in 2004 Banks entered talks with former Flash bandmates Colin Carter and Ray Bennett about a reunion, but he fell out with them and was excluded.

In 2004, Banks formed Harmony in Diversity, an improvisational trio with Andrew Booker and Nick Cottam of the music duo Pulse Engine. They released one album, Trying. Booker left and was replaced by David Speight. Banks formed a second version of the group named Harmony in Diversity II, featuring himself and keyboardist Gonzalo Carrera. The pair worked together in a jazz fusion project named Self-Contained.

In Gibson Guitar's Lifestyle e-magazine o February 2009, Banks is listed as one of the "10 Great Prog Rock Guitarists". According to the article, "Before there was Steve Howe, there was Peter Banks. Artistic differences between Banks and singer Jon Anderson prompted Banks's departure from Yes in 1970, but in his little-known '70s band, Flash, Banks used an ES-335 to create several should-have-been prog rock classics. "Lifetime", from Flash's In the Can album, is his tour-de-force."

In 2018, a documentary film on Banks' life and career written and directed by Heidi Hornbacher was in production, entitled Claiming Peter Banks.

== Personal life and death ==
Banks' first marriage was to American singer and musician Sidonie Jordan (known as Sidney Foxx). They first met in 1974 and co-formed Empire, and divorced in 1985. Banks moved to Los Angeles, California in 1976. In 1996, Banks left the US for his childhood home in Barnet, north London, to care for his ailing father. In 1999, he married Peruvian-born Cecilia Quino Rutte. Although Banks found married life "fantastic" at one point, his second marriage ended in a divorce by the early 2000s due to the effects of his medication to treat his depression, which his friends said made him difficult to live with. A longtime friend said he also went through seasonal "dark" periods around February and March.

In 2011, Banks was hospitalised with a case of septicaemia, likely caused from an infected tooth due to dental neglect. He also caught Legionnaires' disease. During this time his doctors discovered a cancerous tumour. Banks died on 7 March 2013 in his rented flat where he grew up in Chipping Barnet, London, aged 65. He failed to turn up for a scheduled recording session, and a concerned friend had medical staff break into his home, where his body was discovered. The coroner declared that he died from heart failure. His former business partner and manager George Mizer, who he first met in the 1970s, organised Banks' posthumous business affairs, and discovered that Banks' body was unclaimed in the local mortuary. As Banks had no children or a will, Mizer reached out to Quino, who gave the required approval for the body to be released. There was no money to pay for a funeral or wake, so Mizer setup an online fund for fans to contribute. Banks was cremated, after which several friends and associates, including David Cross of King Crimson and original Yes manager Roy Flynn, met for a memorial drink in Denmark Street. Mizer kept the ashes, and sprinkled some in areas that meant something to Banks.

== Discography ==
=== Solo ===
- Two Sides of Peter Banks (1973)
- Instinct (1993)
- Self-Contained (1995)
- Reduction (1997)
- Can I Play You Something? (The Pre-Yes Years Recordings from 1964 to 1968) (1999, compilation)
- The Self-Contained Trilogy (2018, compilation)
- Be Well, Be Safe, Be Lucky... The Anthology (2018, compilation including previously unreleased material)

=== As band member ===
With the Devil's Disciples
- "You Better Move On"/"For Your Love" (1964, on acetate)

With the Syn

- "Created by Clive"/"Grounded" (1967)
- "Flowerman"/"14 Hour Technicolour Dream" (1967)
- Original Syn: Complete History of The Syn 1967-1969 (2005, compilation)

With Neat Change

- "I Lied to Aunty May" (1968)

With Yes

- Yes (1969)
- Time and a Word (1970)
- Yesterdays (1975, compilation)
- Yesyears (1991, compilation)
- Something's Coming: The BBC Recordings 1969–1970 (1997, compilation)

With Flash

- Flash (1972)
- In the Can (1972)
- Out of Our Hands (1973)
- Psychosync (1997, live)
- In Public featuring Peter Banks (2013, live)

With Empire

- Mark I (1995, recorded in 1974)
- Mark II (1996, recorded in 1977)
- Mark III (1996, recorded in 1978)
- The Mars Tapes (2001 and 2014, recorded in 1979)
- The Complete Recordings (2017)
- The Best of Empire (2021)

With Harmony in Diversity

- Trying (2006)
- The Complete Recordings (2018)

With David Cross

- Crossover (2020)
- The Other Horizon (2026)

=== Guest appearances ===
- Vivian Stanshall & Gargantuan Chums – "Suspicion"/"Blind Date" (1970, backing vocals)
- Chris Harwood – Nice to Meet Miss Christine (1970, guitar on "Mama" and "Crying to Be Heard")
- Roger Ruskin Spear – Electric Shocks (1971, guitar on "Blue Baboon" and "Doctor Rock")
- Pete Townshend – With Love (1976, on "All God's Mornings" and "Without Your Love")
- Various Artists – Guitar Workshop Volume Two (1976, "Dancing Angel" and "Warning: Rumble Strips")
- Various Artists – Puttin' on the Style (1978, Lonnie Donegan tribute album. Guitar on "Ham'n Eggs")
- Lionel Richie – Can't Slow Down (1983, uncredited guitar solo on "Hello")
- Keats – Keats (1984, guitar on "Hollywood Heart")
- Grace Jones – Slave to the Rhythm (1985, guitar and the non-album track "Junkyard")
- Tonio K. – Romeo Unchained (1986, guitar on "Impressed" and "You Don't Belong Here")
- Charlie Sexton – "Impressed" (1986)
- Dig Hay Zoose – Struggle Fish (1991)
- Various Artists – Tales from Yesterday (1995, Yes tribute album. Guitar on "Astral Traveller")
- Funky Monkey – Come Together People of Funk (1997)
- Saint Etienne – "Sylvie" (1998)
- Clive Nolan and Oliver Wakeman – Jabberwocky (1999)
- Various Artists – Encore, Legends, & Paradox (1999, Emerson, Lake & Palmer tribute album. Guitar on "The Sheriff" and "Toccata")
- Saint Etienne – Build on Sand (1999, guitar on "Tomorrow Never Dies")
- Michelle Young – Marked for Madness (2001)
- Ray Bennett – Angels & Ghosts (2001)
- Clive Nolan & Oliver Wakeman – The Hound of the Baskervilles (2002)
- Funky Monkey – Join Us in Tomorrow (2002)
- Various Artists – Return to the Dark Side of the Moon (2006, guitar on "Brain Damage"/"Eclipse")
- Ant-Bee – Electronic Church Muzik (2011, "The Guff" and "Endless Journey")
- dB-Infusion – Muso & Proud (2011)
- The Prog Collective by The Prog Collective – (2012, "Social Circles")
- Various Artists – Songs of the Century: An All-Star Tribute to Supertramp (2012, "Give a Little Bit")
- Various Artists – Who Are You – An All-Star Tribute to The Who (2012, "Magic Bus")
- Various Artists – Fly Like an Eagle – An All-Star Tribute to Steve Miller Band (2012, "Winter Time")
- Days Between Stations – In Extremis (2013)
- The Prog Collective – Epilogue (2013)
- Funky Monkey – Undercover (2018)
- Clint Bahr – Puzzlebox (2022, guitar solo on "Kicking the Wasp's Nest")
