= Something's Coming: The BBC Recordings 1969–1970 =

Live album by Yes
- Released: 14 October 1997 (UK); 28 April 1998 (US)
- Recorded: 1969–1970
- Genre: Progressive rock, psychedelic rock
- Length: 95:38
- Label: New Millennium Communications

Yes chronology
Keys to Ascension (1996)	Something's Coming: The BBC Recordings 1969–1970 (1997)	Keys to Ascension 2 (1997)

Alternative cover
- US edition cover, Beyond and Before: The BBC Recordings 1969–1970 (Purple Pyramid)

Something's Coming: The BBC Recordings 1969–1970 is a compilation of live recordings by the progressive rock band, Yes. They are the only live recordings to feature the band's original lineup. It is a compilation of the band's early performances on BBC Radio featuring tracks taken mainly from their first two albums. However, it did feature two rarities: the title track "Something's Coming" from the musical West Side Story had previously only been released as the B-side to the 1969 single "Sweetness" and the track "For Everyone" which has not been released in any other version.

The two-disc set features liner notes by original guitarist Peter Banks, who was fired from the band shortly after these recordings were made. The album was released in 1997, with supervision and notes by Banks. The US edition (licensed by Purple Pyramid, Cleopatra Records) is titled Beyond and Before: The BBC Recordings 1969–1970. There was also a European release on "Double Classics" simply entitled "Something's Coming".

== Track listing ==
Disc one
No.	Title	Writer(s)	Source	Length
1.	"Something's Coming"	Leonard Bernstein, Stephen Sondheim	Top Gear with John Peel, 12 January 1969	7:38
2.	"Everydays"	Stephen Stills	Top Gear with John Peel, 12 January 1969	5:13
3.	"Sweetness"	Jon Anderson, Clive Bailey, Chris Squire	Top Gear with John Peel, 12 January 1969	4:14
4.	"Dear Father"	Anderson, Squire	Top Gear with John Peel, 12 January 1969	5:33
5.	"Every Little Thing"	John Lennon, Paul McCartney	Top Gear with John Peel, 12 January 1969	5:32
6.	"Looking Around"	Anderson, Squire	Dave Symonds Show, 4 August 1969	3:40
7.	"Sweet Dreams"	Anderson, David Foster	Dave Lee Travis Show, 19 January 1970	3:26
8.	"Then"	Anderson	Dave Lee Travis Show, 19 January 1970	4:20
9.	"No Opportunity Necessary, No Experience Needed"	Richie Havens	Beat Club, November 1969	4:17

Disc two
No.	Title	Writer(s)	Source	Length
1.	"Astral Traveller"	Anderson	Live on Sunday Show (intro by John Peel), 17 March 1970	6:01
2.	"Then"	Anderson	Live on Sunday Show, 17 March 1970	5:16
3.	"Every Little Thing"	Lennon, McCartney	Live on Sunday Show, 17 March 1970	6:49
4.	"Everydays"	Stills	Live on Sunday Show, 17 March 1970	6:07
5.	"For Everyone"	Anderson, Squire	Live on Sunday Show, 17 March 1970	4:35
6.	"Sweetness"	Anderson, Bailey, Squire	Johnnie Walker, 14 June 1969	5:17
7.	"Something's Coming"	Bernstein, Sondheim	Top Gear, 23 February 1969	7:59
8.	"Sweet Dreams"	Anderson, Foster	Top Gear, 23 February 1969	4:14
9.	"Beyond & Before"	Squire, Bailey	French broadcast, date unknown	5:27

== Personnel ==
- Jon Anderson – vocals
- Peter Banks – guitars, vocals
- Chris Squire – bass, vocals
- Tony Kaye – Hammond organ, piano
- Bill Bruford – drums

== Charts ==
Chart (1998)	Peak position
UK Independent Albums (OCC)	34
