= Yes (Yes album) =

1969 studio album by Yes

Studio album by Yes
- Released: 25 July 1969
- Recorded: 16 April - 9 May 1969
- Studios: Advision (London); Trident (London)
- Genres: Psychedelic rock; proto-prog
- Length: 40:36
- Label: Atlantic
- Producers: Paul Clay; Yes

Yes chronology
| Yes (1969) | Time and a Word (1970) |

Singles from Yes
- 1. "Sweetness" Released: 4 July 1969; 2. "Looking Around" Released: 3 October 1969

Alternative cover
- Original US cover

Yes is the debut studio album by English rock band Yes, first released in the UK on 25 July 1969 and in the US on 15 October 1969 by Atlantic Records. After forming in the summer of 1968, the band toured extensively across the United Kingdom with sets comprising both original material and rearranged cover versions. They signed with Atlantic in March 1969, and entered Advision and Trident Studios in London to record their first album. Yes includes covers of "Every Little Thing" by the Beatles and "I See You" by the Byrds.

Yes was positively received by critics in the United Kingdom and United States, but was not commercially successful and failed to chart in either country. Two singles from the album were released: "Sweetness" and "Looking Around". The album was remastered in 1994 and 2003, the latter containing several previously unreleased tracks, including a rendition of "Something's Coming" from West Side Story.

== Background ==
In August 1968, Yes formed with a line-up of singer Jon Anderson, bassist Chris Squire, guitarist Peter Banks, drummer Bill Bruford, and keyboardist Tony Kaye; the band played their first gig under the name on 4 August. They toured the United Kingdom extensively, playing sets featuring both original material and rearranged cover songs from rock, pop, funk, and jazz artists. Bruford left the band temporarily with the aim of pursuing education at university, with Tony O’Reilly as his replacement, but the line-up returned to its original formation in November 1968. In the course of the search for a record label, manager Roy Flynn and Atlantic managing director Frank Fenter secured a deal to have Yes audition at the Speakeasy Club in London for Ahmet Ertegun of Atlantic Records. The gig was a success, and news of the band's signing to the label were reported by the press in March 1969.

== Production ==
=== Recording ===
With their contract secured, Yes recorded their debut album in the spring of 1969, mostly at Advision with additional sessions at Trident Studios in London. Anderson and Banks recalled that the band were in the studio for between one and four weeks. They were joined by producer Paul Clay and engineer Gerald Chevin (and John Anthony at Trident). Banks was unsure as to how Clay became involved in the album; he deemed Clay unfit for the job, for he had worked on film soundtracks and knew little about working with rock bands, which caused the album to lack in quality as a result, with Bruford's drums sounding "like biscuit tins" and Banks' guitar sounding "clangy". Banks nicknamed Chevin "The Weasel" or "The Ferret", for his small stature and glasses that made him resemble "a rocket scientist from the 1950s", and for his general distaste for rock music. Chevin also consistently asked the band to turn their levels down, much to the dislike of Banks, who would put his guitar levels up when no one was looking.

Recording was also met with technical difficulties, with the group spending two days trying to get a Hammond organ for Kaye to play on to function correctly. They hired one to use, for Kaye owned a Vox Continental disguised as a Hammond. These sessions marked Bruford's first time in a professional recording studio, and it was only when the album was nearly complete that he realised he could alter the volume levels of the other band members' instruments in his headphones. Instead, he recorded his parts with the guitar loud in one ear "and nothing else in the other". Bruford described his playing on the album as "a mishmash of everything I'd heard" and later recognised his naïve playing, specifically to "swing on the cymbals". Around the third day of recording, Ertegun visited the studio to hear what had been put down, but the band had nothing to play for him.

=== Songs ===
"Beyond and Before" was written by Squire and Clive Bailey, former singer and guitarist in Mabel Greer's Toyshop, the rock band that was a precursor to Yes. The band would open their live shows with this tune, which features three-part harmonies, an attribute of Yes that quickly became a trademark in their sound. Years later, Banks was still unsure as to what the lyrics meant, yet suggested they were "drug induced". Squire described it as "one of those acid rock kind of songs" with its psychedelic lyrics. "I See You" is a cover version of the original performed by American rock band the Byrds. Banks was disappointed with the version recorded for the album, for he later recognised the mistakes on it. The instrumental section with the guitar solo was often stretched for several minutes when performed live, sometimes ending in Banks throwing his guitar in the air and banging it on stage. "Yesterday and Today" was one of the tracks recorded at Trident and features Bruford playing the vibraphone. Despite Bruford telling the band he could play the instrument, Banks remembered the drummer getting nervous when it came to recording. "Looking Around" remained one of Squire's favourite tracks on the album. When it came to recording it, the band had some difficulties with its pitching, for they were uncertain of which key the song was in.

"Harold Land" got its title from Bruford, who recalled someone asking out loud what the track should be called. "I remember somebody saying ... 'I want to write a song about a man called...' and I said, 'Harold Land' as I walked through the room". The song is named after Harold Land, an American tenor saxophonist, yet the song's lyrics deal with the effects of war on the named character. The album's second cover version is "Every Little Thing" by the Beatles. Squire did not realise how much he liked the band's version until he turned on the radio after performing at Madison Square Garden in New York City in 1984 and liked the instrumentation, failing to recognise it was the band's version being played until Anderson's voice was heard. "Sweetness" was the first song that Anderson and Squire collaborated on following their initial meeting. It is featured in the comedy drama film Buffalo '66 (1998), the first film with Vincent Gallo as director. "Survival" was a song that had contributions from the whole band, but it was not worked on fully due to the limited time they had to finish the album. It later became bothersome for Bruford, due to its ecology-inspired lyrics and "drippy" melody. Anderson said the lyrics are "a simple story about how nature is an amazing thing that surrounds us."

=== Sleeve design ===
The album was packaged in a gatefold sleeve, with the UK pressing featuring a front cover of the word "YES" in blue and red inside a speech bubble against a plain black background. The sleeve was designed by Crosby/Fletcher/Forbes, a design collaboration between graphic designers Theo Crosby, Alan Fletcher, and Colin Forbes, with additional design work from Haig Adishian. Music journalist and band biographer Chris Welch later wrote: "Although the sleeve wasn't graced with the kind of elaborate cover art that Roger Dean would introduce on the 1971 Fragile album, the ... cover was most effective". The front cover of the United States and Canada pressings features a photograph of the band at an architectural centre in Fulham, taken by American photographer David Gahr. It was also included in the album's 2003 remastered release. The gatefold includes a group photograph and mid-gig shots taken by Nicky Wright at Parliament Hill Fields in north London. When it came to producing the liner notes, Flynn requested that his name be omitted from the list of credits. Anderson is credited on the original release as "John"; he removed the "h" from his name in 1970.

== Release and reception ==
Professional ratings
Review scores
| Source | Rating |
|---|---|
| AllMusic | 3/5 stars |
| The Encyclopedia of Popular Music | 3/5 stars |
| Rolling Stone | (favourable) |
| The Rolling Stone Album Guide | 2/5 stars |

Yes was released on 25 July 1969 in the UK. Its release in the US followed on 15 October 1969. "Sweetness" was put out as the album's lead single and the band's first overall; Banks disagreed with this being done, for he thought it was the song that least represented the band's style.

The album received a positive reception from two American newspapers. Scott Campbell of the Arizona Republic wrote that Yes are "a promising set" that deliver on being "solid and together at nearly all times", with "strong and competent" vocals from Anderson. David Wagner, in the Post-Crescent, agreed with Campbell that Yes were a "very promising" group. He recognised "a lot of jazz swinginess" on the album, particularly on the two cover songs, and compared Banks's guitar style to that of Wes Montgomery which comes across strong on the guitar and drum section on "I See You". Wagner rated the band's original material as "generally good" and "fully arranged" despite the over-sentimental quality of "Sweetness", "but there are so many delights on so many levels here that it's hard to complain". Lester Bangs favourably reviewed the album in Rolling Stone, writing that it was "the kind of album that sometimes insinuates itself into your routine with a totally unexpected thrust of musical power."

== Track listing ==
Side one
| No. | Title | Writer(s) | Length |
|---|---|---|---|
| 1. | "Beyond and Before" | Chris Squire, Clive Bailey | 4:52 |
| 2. | "I See You" | Jim McGuinn, David Crosby | 6:47 |
| 3. | "Yesterday and Today" | Jon Anderson | 2:49 |
| 4. | "Looking Around" | Anderson, Squire | 3:58 |

Side two
| No. | Title | Writer(s) | Length |
|---|---|---|---|
| 1. | "Harold Land" | Anderson, Squire, Bill Bruford | 5:40 |
| 2. | "Every Little Thing" | Lennon–McCartney | 5:41 |
| 3. | "Sweetness" | Anderson, Squire, Bailey | 4:31 |
| 4. | "Survival" | Anderson | 6:18 |

2003 remaster bonus tracks
| No. | Title | Writer(s) | Length |
|---|---|---|---|
| 9. | "Everydays" (Single Version) | Stephen Stills | 6:23 |
| 10. | "Dear Father" (Early Version #2) | Anderson, Squire | 5:51 |
| 11. | "Something's Coming" | Leonard Bernstein, Stephen Sondheim | 7:09 |
| 12. | "Everydays" (Early Version) | Stills | 5:18 |
| 13. | "Dear Father" (Early Version #1) | Anderson, Squire | 5:31 |
| 14. | "Something's Coming" (Early Version) | Bernstein, Sondheim | 8:02 |

== Personnel ==
Credits are adapted from the album's 1969 and 2003 sleeve notes.

Yes

- Bill Bruford – drums, vibraphone
- Tony Kaye – organ, piano
- Peter Banks – guitars, vocals
- Chris Squire – bass, vocals
- Jon Anderson – lead vocals, incidental percussion

Technical personnel

- Paul Clay – production
- Yes – production
- Gerald Chevin – engineer
- John Anthony – engineer (Trident Studios sessions only)
- Crosby/Fletcher/Forbes – sleeve design
- Peter Sanders – other photographs
- Nicky Wright – full page photograph
- Haig Adishian – cover design (UK edition)
- David Gahr – cover photograph (US edition)

== Reissues ==
- 1989 – Atlantic – CD
- 1994 – Atlantic – CD (Remastered)
- 2003 – Rhino – CD (Remastered with bonus tracks)
- 2014 – Friday Music – Vinyl
- 2015 – Music on Vinyl – Vinyl (Remastered by DigiPrep)
- 2019 – Atlantic – Vinyl

== Charts ==
| Chart (2019–2024) | Peak position |
|---|---|
| Hungarian Physical Albums (MAHASZ) | 25 |
| UK Rock & Metal Albums (Official Charts) | 22 |
