= Tony Kaye (musician) =

British keyboardist

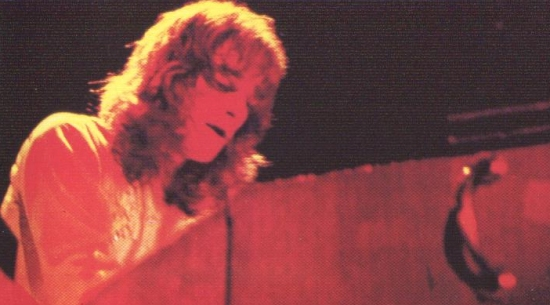
- Tony Kaye in 1973

Background information
- Born: Anthony John Selvidge; 11 January 1946 (age 80); Leicester, England
- Genres: Progressive rock; rock
- Occupations: Musician
- Instrument: Keyboards
- Years active: 1963–present
- Label: Spirit of Unicorn Music
- Member of: Circa
- Formerly of: Yes; Flash; Badger; Detective; Badfinger; Yoso; David Bowie Band; Mabel Greer's Toyshop

Anthony John Selvidge (born 11 January 1946), known professionally as Tony Kaye, is an English keyboardist, best known as a founding member of the progressive rock band Yes. Born into a musical family, Kaye was classically trained and intended to become a concert pianist before he developed an interest in jazz and contemporary rock and pop music. He joined several groups throughout the 1960s, including the Federals, Johnny Taylor's Star Combo, Jimmy Winston & His Reflections, and Bittersweet.

In 1968, Kaye became a founding member of Yes and played on their first three albums until 1971. He then formed Badger and relocated to Los Angeles in 1974, after which he toured with David Bowie and joined Detective. Kaye also played in Badfinger and appeared on their final studio album in 1981. He returned to Yes in 1983 before he left again in 1995.

Kaye has since been involved with several projects with Billy Sherwood and is a current member of CIRCA:. From 2009 to 2011, the two were also members of the supergroup Yoso with members of Toto. In 2017, Kaye was inducted into the Rock and Roll Hall of Fame as a member of Yes.

== Early life ==
Kaye was born on 11 January 1946 in Leicester to Winifred and Norman. He grew up in a working-class family in north London, with four brothers.

His grandmother was a concert pianist and his grandfather a jazz saxophonist; upon her death she left Kaye her grand piano which he played on when he was little. At age four, Kaye began formal piano lessons with Ms. Flanagan who became a strong influence on him musically and philosophically. By the time he reached eight, he had started to enjoy playing and displayed the ability to recite several classical music pieces. Kaye took part in his first concerts at twelve in solo and duet piano performances. He continued lessons until he turned eighteen. Kaye aspired to pursue study at the Royal College of Music in London to become a concert pianist, but he developed an interest in other music once he heard jazz musicians Count Basie and Duke Ellington. He was also inspired by Victor Borge. During his time at grammar school, he formed a jazz trio with friends, and at fifteen, became a member of the Leicester-based Danny Rogers Orchestra, playing four gigs a week. The leader put Kaye on a postal course in arrangement. Kaye also received lessons in the clarinet and played the instrument as part of a big band.

After Kaye left school, he chose not to pursue classical piano due to the heavy competition and a lack of self-belief. He also wished to avoid teaching music, which led to his three-year enrolment at Leicester Art College studying advertising and design while performing in groups or the big band in his spare time. Kaye was asked to leave the college before he could graduate, a trip to Europe having left him "mixed up and dissatisfied".

== Career ==
=== 1963–1968: Early bands ===
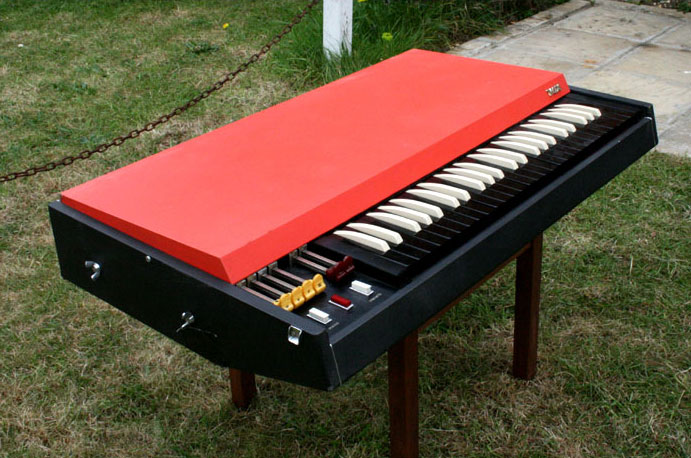
Kaye first acquired a Vox Continental organ in the 1960s

By the early 1960s, Kaye had abandoned his classical background in favour of pop and rock music. He had moved to London, and visited The Marquee club to watch bands play, including keyboardist Graham Bond whose style became a strong influence. Kaye had acquired a Vox Continental, a transistor-based combo organ, while in the big band and until seeing Bond, had played it "like a piano".

Kaye landed a position in The Federals through an advertisement in Melody Maker and played on their singles recorded between 1963 and 1967, Mainly a covers and comedy showband, the group opened for Roy Orbison for a European tour in 1965. Kaye then became a member of Yellow Passion Loaf and Johnny Taylor's Star Combo, followed by Jimmy Winston & His Reflections, also known as Winston's Fumbs. Also that year he toured Europe once more, this time with French singer Johnny Hallyday. Kaye then had a brief stint as a member of Bittersweet.

=== 1968–1971: Yes ===
In 1968, Kaye was invited to attend rehearsals with members of Mabel Greer's Toyshop, a London-based psychedelic rock band who were forming a new, full-time group. He was approached by bassist Chris Squire after singer Jon Anderson had met Kaye some time before and suggested him. After a successful audition, they renamed themselves Yes and began touring nationwide from August 1968. By the end of the year, the band had earned enough money to purchase a Hammond organ for Kaye. During his first tenure in Yes, Kaye played on their first three studio albums: Yes (1969), Time and a Word (1970), and The Yes Album (1971). The latter includes Kaye's first songwriting credit which he received on the group-written track "Yours Is No Disgrace". To promote the album, Kaye embarked on the band's first concert tour of the US in June and July 1971.

During rehearsals for their next album, Fragile (1971), Kaye began to have problems with new guitarist Steve Howe who kept insisting the band expand their sound with electronic keyboards such as the Mellotron and synthesiser. Kaye disagreed with this approach and preferred organ and piano. Kaye was fired and quickly replaced by Rick Wakeman of The Strawbs who re-recorded some parts originally written by Kaye, including sections on "Heart of the Sunrise". Kaye later revealed that Yes's manager Brian Lane gave him US$10,000 (approx. $62,000 in 2018 dollars) in exchange for all of his royalties.

=== 1971–1982: Flash, Badger, Detective, and Badfinger ===
Kaye joined several groups for the remainder of the decade. He played on the self-titled debut album by Flash, a band founded by ex-Yes guitarist Peter Banks but declined their offer to become a full-time member. Kaye then formed Badger with bassist David Foster, a friend of Jon Anderson's who also co-wrote some early Yes songs. They released One Live Badger (1973), recorded in concert with Jon Anderson producing, and White Lady (1974), recorded in New Orleans with producer Allen Toussaint featuring Jackie Lomax on vocals. Kaye also re-united with Yes bandmate Chris Squire and new Yes drummer Alan White when they appeared on the Eddie Harris album E.H. in the U.K. (1973), playing Moog on "I Waited for You" and "Conversations of Everything and Nothing".

Shortly after releasing Badger's White Lady, Kaye recalled the group "wasn't really doing anything" and decided to leave England and relocate to Los Angeles. He initially settled in Hyatt House on Sunset Boulevard next door to Led Zeppelin drummer John Bonham. Kaye developed an addiction to alcohol and barbiturates during this time and underwent a successful withdrawal program, after which he remained sober. In January 1976, during a birthday party held for Kaye at the Rainbow Bar and Grill, he met David Bowie's tour manager and accepted his offer to join Bowie in Jamaica to prepare for his upcoming tour in support of Station to Station. The Isolar – 1976 Tour reached North America and Europe from February to May 1976; Kaye is featured on the bonus live tracks on the 1990 and 2010 reissues of the album.

In 1977, Kaye had returned to Los Angeles and joined Detective with singer Michael Des Barres. The group signed to Led Zeppelin's label Swan Song Records and toured as the opening act for Kiss. Kaye played on their two studio albums: Detective (1977) and It Takes One to Know One (1977), as well as the promotional only release, Live from the Atlantic Studios (1978). Around 1979, Kaye took up work in music production and management in the Los Angeles area in various capacities for around three years.

In 1979, Kaye accepted an invitation to join Badfinger for their upcoming North American tour. He was unaware of the band's turbulent history until he read a 1998 biography on them. Despite the tour containing dates at "really shitty clubs with small audiences", Kaye proved to be a strong performer. Drummer Peter Clarke recalled that at each gig, Kaye had requested venue staff have two ice buckets, one for each hand, ready so he could put his hands in them after the show. Clarke added, "they were like balloons afterwards, just throbbing". Kaye spoke highly of the tour and the band got along well, but they lacked the right management. He resumed management work at its conclusion, but returned in late 1980 after he was chosen to play in a new line-up. Early rehearsals turned sour, and Kaye went on to bring in Richard Bryans on drums and Glenn Sherba on guitar. Kaye is featured on Say No More, their final studio album of all new material, released in 1981.

=== 1982–1994: Return to Yes ===
In 1982, Kaye was invited to form a new band with Squire, Alan White, and singer and guitarist Trevor Rabin. Much of their new material derived from a set of demos produced by Rabin that displayed a more pop-oriented and commercial style of rock music, and Squire thought of Kaye as their ideal keyboardist due to his simpler, more textural approach. Kaye accepted Squire's offer and entered rehearsals in London under the name Cinema with producer Trevor Horn. However, conflicts between Kaye and Horn led to Kaye's exit after several months, leaving Rabin to handle the remaining keyboard parts. By mid-1983, Jon Anderson had also joined the band as lead singer and it was decided, after some hesitation, to rename this new lineup 'Yes'. Kaye, in the meantime, had rejoined Badfinger and gone off on a North American tour and was replaced by Eddie Jobson. When this tour ended in October, Kaye accepted an offer by management to return to Yes where he and Jobson would share keyboard duties. This, however, did not sit well with Jobson, who left shortly thereafter.

The resulting album, 90125, had included greater use of MIDI technology, which reignited Kaye's interest in contemporary keyboards unlike the time of his first departure from Yes. He was absent from the group during filming of the video to "Owner of a Lonely Heart", the lead single from 90125, shots of Jobson having been removed from the sequence as much as possible. A second video for 'Owner' featuring the band with Kaye was subsequently produced. 90125 became Yes's highest selling album which was supported by a 12-month world tour. Kaye operated a MIDI system of analogue and digital keyboards on the tour, two of which he played on stage which controlled additional samples and sound effects from 12 keyboards placed backstage that were co-handled by keyboard programmer Casey Young. His solo spot on the tour, titled "Si", is included on the live album 9012Live: The Solos. Yes then recorded Big Generator with Kaye playing a majority of the keyboard parts with some minor assistance from Trevor Rabin. Before recording, Kaye and his technician Robby Eagle built a MIDI keyboard system to his specifications.

After touring in 1988, Yes remained inactive for two years. Around this time, Kaye committed to a solo instrumental album for Cinema Records and Lee Abrams. The album was fully written, but it was recorded with a drum machine which Kaye grew tired of, and he felt the music better suited with vocals and backing musicians, so he abandoned the work. From 1990 to 1992, Kaye was a part of the eight-member formation of Yes that produced Union and played on the album's supporting tour. The tour marked the first time Kaye and Rick Wakeman met and worked together. In contrast to Wakeman's battery of keyboards, Kaye adopted a simpler set-up of two Yamaha KX76s.

Kaye stayed with Yes for their next album Talk, which features the 90125 and Big Generator line-up and which credits Kaye on the Hammond organ only, the rest of the keyboard parts being performed by Rabin. On their 1994 tour, however, Kaye did play most keyboard parts, using master keyboards which played additional sounds and samples from racks placed beneath the stage. In 1995, both Kaye and Rabin left Yes, Kaye's offer to stay on in a management capacity having been turned down.

=== 1994–present: Recent activity ===
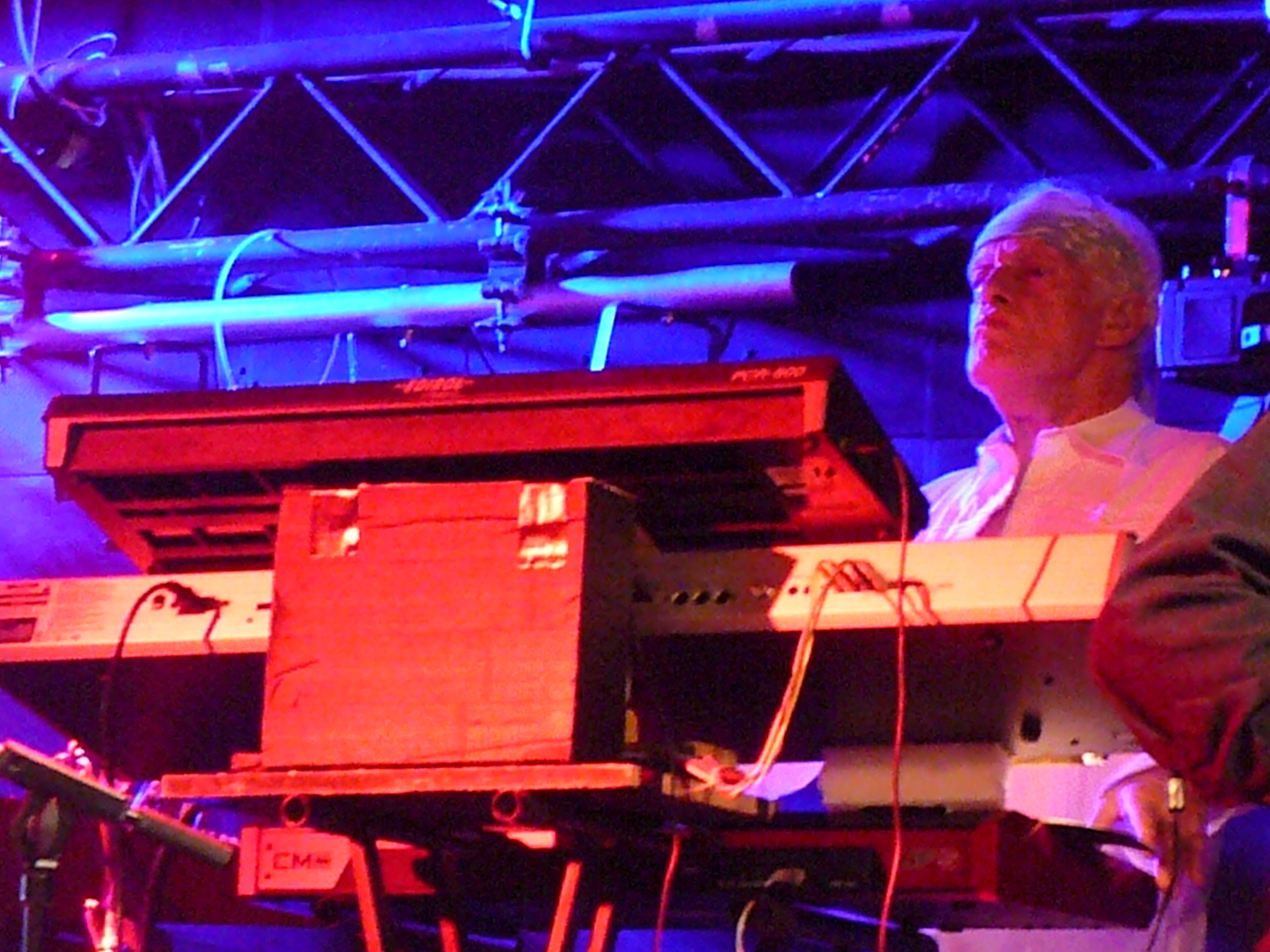
Kaye performing with Yoso in 2010

Between the mid-1990s and early 2000s, Kaye was largely retired from the music industry, although he did appear on a number of archival Yes releases, including Something's Coming: The BBC Recordings 1969–1970 and The Word is Live. Kaye went on to play in the Neil Young tribute band The Neil Deal, and assisted in production duties for his wife, actress and singer Daniela Torchia.

Around 2006, Yes member Billy Sherwood asked Kaye to play on some Pink Floyd tribute albums that he was overseeing. Kaye had been out of the music industry for some time and was partly residing in the Cayman Islands. A big fan of Pink Floyd, Kaye could not refuse the offer and "got my B3 out of retirement". During the recording sessions, the pair entered discussions on forming a new band which led to the announcement of CIRCA: in 2007. Since transporting Kaye's B3 to Sherwood's studio and gigs was too difficult, Kaye plays the software synthesiser Hammond B4 from a laptop through a controller keyboard. Both formed the short lived supergroup Yoso which formed in 2009 and disbanded in 2011.

In 2018, Kaye joined Yes on stage as a special guest for their Cruise to the Edge dates and for the American dates on their 50th Anniversary Tour.

Kaye's debut solo album, End of Innocence, was released on 10 September 2021 through Spirit of Unicorn Music and distributed via Cherry Red Records. The album is a musical interpretation of his thoughts and feelings over the events surrounding September 11 attacks in 2001, and the aftermath.

== Style and reception ==
Kaye is known for his more simple, more supportive style of playing and avoids long and improvised solos. Yes biographer Tim Morse named Kaye a "'gentleman of rock' for his polite demeanour and his distinguished looks". Longtime Yes producer and mixer Eddy Offord named Kaye as one of the best Hammond organists. Guitarist Steve Howe named Kaye a "good group member" and praised his contributions to Yes. Geoff Downes said he had always admired Kaye's playing and the sound he got from the Hammond.

== Personal life ==
In 1974, Kaye left England and moved to Los Angeles, California. He has not acquired American citizenship. In 2011, he stated Sherman Oaks as his place of residence. In 2019, Kaye relocated to Sarasota, Florida.

Kaye has tinnitus in his left ear. He was once engaged to Squire's stepdaughter Carmen, but he later married actress and singer-songwriter Daniela Torchia.

Kaye is a keen tennis player and played in professional tournaments in the 1980s. Kaye began a series of small businesses apart from music. He has been involved in a number of legal actions against Yes's former manager Brian Lane over alleged unpaid royalties.

Kaye unsuccessfully auditioned for the part of the Hammond player in the mock-documentary This Is Spinal Tap.

== Discography ==
=== Solo ===
- End of Innocence (10 September 2021)

=== As band member ===
with The Federals

- "Boot Hill"/"Keep on Dancing with Me" (1963)
- "Brazil"/"In a Persian Market" (1963)
- "Marlena"/"Please Believe Me" (1964)
- "Twilight Time"/"Lost and Alone" (1964)
- "A Bucketful of Love"/"Leah" (1965)
- "What I'd Say" (1966)
- "Dance with a Dolly"/"The Climb" (1967)

with Winston's Fumbs

- "Real Crazy Apartment"/"Snow White" – (1967; released on Nuggets II – Original Artyfacts from the British Empire and Beyond 1964–1969 (2001))

with Yes -Studio albums :

- Yes (1969)
- Time and a Word (1970)
- The Yes Album (1971)
- 90125 (1983)
- Big Generator (1987)
- Union (1991)
- Talk (1994)

-Live albums :

- 9012Live: The Solos (1985)
- Union Live (2011)
- Union 30 Live (2021) Boxset including 26CD+4DVD covering 1991-1992 period.

-Compilations :

- Yesterdays (1975)
- Classic Yes (1981)
- YesYears (1991) 4 CD Boxset

with Flash

- Flash (1972)

with Badger

- One Live Badger (1973)
- White Lady (1974)
- Dean's List (1998; compilation)

with Detective

- Detective (1977)
- It Takes One To Know One (1978)

with Badfinger

- Say No More (1981)

with CIRCA:

- CIRCA: 2007 (2007)
- CIRCA: Live (2008)
- CIRCA: HQ (2009)
- CIRCA: Overflow (2009)
- And So On (2011)
- Live From Here There & Everywhere (2013)
- Valley of the Windmill (2016)

with Yoso

- Elements (2010)

Billy Sherwood & Tony Kaye

- Live in Japan (2016)

=== As sideman ===
- Topo D. Bil – "Witchi Tai To" (Charisma, 1969), 7" single; also released as "Witchitaito"; later included on Refugees: A Charisma Records Anthology 1969–1978 (2009) and as a bonus track on the 2007 re-release of the Bonzo Dog Band's Keynsham
- Bonzo Dog Band – Let's Make Up and Be Friendly (1972)
- Eddie Harris – E.H. in the U.K. (Atlantic, 1974) – Moog on I Waited For You & Conversations Of Everything And Nothing with Chris Squire, Alan White, Steve Winwood, Albert Lee.
- Murray Head – Say It Ain't So (1975) – Piano on Someone's Rockin' my Dreamboat.
- David Bowie – Station to Station (1976): Kaye only appears on live bonus tracks on the 1991 and 2010 re-issues
- Various artists – Pigs & Pyramids—An All Star Lineup Performing the Songs of Pink Floyd (2002)
- Various artists – Back Against the Wall (2005)
- Daniela Torchia – Have No Fear (2005); also Spanish-language version of same album, Sin Miedo
- Various artists – Return to the Dark Side of the Moon (2006)
- Various artists – From Here to Infinity (2007); re-released as Rock Infinity (2007)
- Various artists – Led Box: The Ultimate Tribute to Led Zeppelin (2008)
- Various artists – Abbey Road: A Tribute to The Beatles (2009)
- John Wetton – Raised in Captivity (2011): songs "The Human Condition" and "Don't Misunderstand Me"
- The Prog Collective (2012)
- Various artists – Songs of the Century: An All-Star Tribute to Supertramp (2012)
- The Prog Collective (2012)
- Edison's Lab – Edison's Lab EP (2012)
- Various artists – The Fusion Syndicate (Atom Smashing song) (2012)
- Various artists – Fly Like an Eagle: An All-Star Tribute to Steve Miller Band (2013), on Take the Money and Run
- David Bowie – Live Nassau Coliseum '76 (2017)
- Peter Banks – Be Well, Be Safe, Be Lucky... The Anthology (2018)
- David Cross and Peter Banks – Crossover (2020)
