= Flash (band) =

English progressive rock band

- Origin: London, England
- Genre: Progressive rock
- Years active: 1971–1973, 2010–2013
- Labels: Sovereign, Capitol, Voiceprint, Friday Music
- Past members: Peter Banks; Colin Carter; Ray Bennett; Mike Hough
- Website: flash.net.co

Flash was an English progressive rock group, formed by former Yes guitarist Peter Banks, vocalist Colin Carter, bassist Ray Bennett, and drummer Mike Hough in August 1971.

== Early career ==
The band went into the recording studio in November 1971 to record its debut album, and performed its first gig on 14 January 1972.

Flash had a hit with "Small Beginnings" (1972, No. 29 Billboard Hot 100 chart) which was featured in the movie, Record Review. The song has been included in numerous compilation albums, most recently Bob Stroud's Rock 'n Roll Roots, Vol. 10.

The band released three albums, Flash (1972), In the Can (1972 Nov.) and Out of Our Hands (1973).

Flash were signed with Sovereign, a subsidiary of Capitol Records. The debut LP sold in excess of 100,000 copies. They toured North America a total of four times, and Continental Europe (Netherlands, Belgium and Germany) once, in early 1972, while regularly playing gigs in their native UK, including a joint tour with Beck, Bogert & Appice in 1973. Flash also did a brief tour of Australia, while making their third album. Without consulting the band, and to everyone's dismay, including Banks', Capitol released the third album under the name Flash – featuring England's Peter Banks, to avoid a legal challenge from another local band named 'Flash', and to help promote Banks' solo album Two Sides of Peter Banks (1973) which was released on Capitol almost concurrently.

Flash disbanded during an American tour in Albuquerque, New Mexico, in November 1973.

== Flash after 1973 ==
In the years following the band's breakup, the musicians kept working together in various combinations.

Bennett and Carter tried to start another band, eventually joined by Hough, with keyboard player Chris Pidgeon and ex-Flaming Youth member Gordon Smith on guitar, later replaced by Barry Paul (ex-Savoy Brown). After playing what turned out to be its only gig at London's Marquee Club, the band (unofficially named Blaze) settled in New York, but failed to secure a record deal (its management having turned down several offers hoping for a better one to turn up) and broke up. Just after this, Carter and Hough were part of another band in New York, Storm, with New York keyboardist Al Greenwood. This band also failed to launch and Greenwood ended up in the much more successful Foreigner. Ray Bennett was invited to join Foreigner on bass as the band was forming, but declined.

In 1975, Banks invited Bennett to join him in a new project with Sidonie Jordan [aka Sydney Foxx] (vocals) and Andrew McCulloch (drums, formerly of King Crimson and Greenslade). Initial rehearsals in London led to a demo recording, but despite the help of Pete Townshend and Robert Stigwood, Banks failed to secure a deal. Later, Bennett recorded another demo with Jordan and McCulloch, but without Banks.

In 1976, Bennett was briefly a member of Banks' new project, Empire, again featuring Jordan, but the reunion was short-lived.

In the early 1980s, with all ex-Flash members now based in Los Angeles, a reformation was attempted but failed to take off. Banks and Bennett kept playing together informally until they fell out again.

A 1997 release, Psychosync, compiled a live recording made in 1973 for a WLIR radio broadcast as well as their two songs performed on The Midnight Special TV show.

A 2013 release, Flash in Public, a live recording from a 1973 concert at Kansas City's Cowtown Ballroom, was being prepared by Peter Banks at the time of his death.

More recently, Bennett and Carter have been working together again under the Flash name (Hough was initially involved but later dropped out, and there was, briefly, talk of Banks taking part but, in the end, Banks fell out again with Bennett and Carter and was excluded).

Bennett (now on lead guitar) and Carter played together as a duo under the Flash name at the 2005 Baja Prog Festival in Mexico.

Bennett and Carter posted new Flash material on the flash/bennettcarter MySpace website in July 2009. Titles of the new songs are "Grand Canyon", "How the West Was Won" (later changed to "Into the Sun") and "10,000". Videos of the reunited Flash can be found on YouTube.

In addition to the new material, Flash posted rehearsal videos of original Flash songs released on earlier albums. These include "Children of the Universe" from the debut album Flash (1972), and "Manhattan Morning" from the third album Out of our Hands (1973).

On 31 August 2010, the full band made their first public appearance since the breakup, a "live dress rehearsal" in preparation for an upcoming mini-tour. It took place at The E-String Bar in Henderson, Nevada, just southeast of Las Vegas. The lineup consisted of Colin Carter (vocals), Ray Bennett (guitar, vocals), Wayne Carver (bass, vocals), Mark Pardy (drums), and Rick Daugherty (keyboards).

Flash made their official reunion debut headlining the International ProgDay Festival in Chapel Hill, North Carolina on 4 September 2010. Peter Banks' death in March 2013 occurred just before the May 2013 scheduled release of the first Flash album in 40 years, Flash Featuring Ray Bennett & Colin Carter (Cleopatra Records). It was reported that Banks heard three of the tracks from the upcoming album before his sudden death and liked them, especially the band's first recording of a cover tune, Nine Inch Nails track, "Hurt".

Colin Carter died on 10 January 2025, at the age of 76.

== Discography ==
=== Albums ===
List of albums, showing all relevant details
Title	Year	Peak chart positions	
Title	Year	US BB	US CB
Flash	1972	33	39
In the Can	1972	121	109
Out of Our Hands	1973	135	83
Psychosync (live performances US radio/TV)	1997	—	—
Flash Featuring Ray Bennett & Colin Carter	2013	—	—
In Public (live performance, Kansas City, 21 January 1973)	2013	—	—

=== Singles ===
List of singles, showing all relevant details
Name	Year	Peak chart positions	
Name	Year	US Hot 100	US Top 100
"Small Beginnings"	1972	29	30
"Lifetime"	1972	–	–
