= Time and a Word =

1970 studio album by Yes

Studio album by Yes
- Released: 24 July 1970
- Recorded: 17 December 1969 – 5 February 1970
- Studios: Advision, London
- Genre: Progressive rock
- Length: 39:08
- Label: Atlantic
- Producer: Tony Colton

Yes chronology
Yes (1969)	Time and a Word (1970)	The Yes Album (1971)

Singles from Time and a Word
- 1. "Time and a Word" Released: 27 March 1970; 2. "Sweet Dreams" Released: 19 June 1970

Alternative cover
- US cover featuring Steve Howe (far right)

Time and a Word is the second studio album by English rock band Yes, first released in the UK on 24 July 1970 and in the US on 2 November 1970 by Atlantic Records. It was put together several months after the release of the band's 1969 eponymous debut, during which they continued to tour heavily and recorded Time and a Word between shows. Yes continued to follow their early musical direction of performing original material and cover versions of songs by pop, jazz, and folk artists. A small orchestra of brass and string session musicians was used on most of the album's songs.

Guitarist Peter Banks did not support the idea of adding an orchestra to the album, resulting in increased tensions between him and the rest of the group. During their UK tour in April 1970, and before the album's release, Banks was fired by the band and replaced by Steve Howe. The UK album cover was considered inappropriate for the American market, so a photograph of the band was used; due to the lineup change, this put Howe on the cover of an album on which he did not perform.

Time and a Word received mixed reviews from critics, but became the band's first release to enter the UK Albums Chart, peaking at number 45. It did not chart in the United States. In 2003 the album was remastered with several previously unreleased tracks.

== Background and recording ==
After the release of their debut album Yes in July 1969 for Atlantic Records, Yes resumed extensive touring across the UK. The line-up of the group at this time included lead vocalist Jon Anderson, guitarist Peter Banks, bassist Chris Squire, drummer Bill Bruford, and organist Tony Kaye. Towards the end of 1969, they booked time at Advision Studios in London during gaps between shows to record Time and a Word. In a November 1969 interview during a tour of Switzerland, Bruford talked about the album, saying Anderson was "pouring out new numbers for us to play ... Usually he writes a tune and we listen to the tape and take it from there". At Advision, Yes were joined by producer Tony Colton, a friend of Anderson who was also the singer of the rock band Heads Hands & Feet. Phil Carson, the European managing director of Atlantic and a fan of the band, brought in audio engineer Eddy Offord to assist Colton in the album's production because of his skills and hard work. Offord would become a key figure in the band's history in the 1970s as their producer and live sound mixer.

The group continued to follow their early musical direction of performing original material and rearranged versions of songs by other pop, jazz, and folk performers. They followed the same format as Yes: an album of eight tracks with two covers. A discussion amongst Squire, Anderson, and Colton during the writing process led to the decision of incorporating orchestral arrangements into some of their new songs. Anderson wished to use an orchestra as their new ideas needed additional sounds. He observed that Banks and Kaye had not worked together to create a strong sound that their new arrangements required. To attempt to solve this, the group discussed using a Mellotron and tested one out, but the idea fell through. Instead, a brass section of session players and a string section formed of students from the Royal College of Music were hired to perform arrangements written and conducted by Tony Cox.

Time and a Word was met with "Yes-style controversy", as described by band biographer and reporter Chris Welch. Banks became the most outspoken member over his issues surrounding the album which began the strain on his relationship with the rest of the group. He did not support the idea of an orchestra and thought it merely followed what rock bands Deep Purple and the Nice had already done. He argued it merely played parts originally written for the guitar or organ, leaving his active participation to the album a minimum or his guitar buried into the album's mix. Banks also disagreed with the decision to have Colton produce the album and claimed that Colton lacked the experience and personally disliked Banks and his playing. Colton's ability was also questioned by Squire, who recalled one incident during the mixing of "No Opportunity Necessary, No Experience Needed", by which time Banks' replacement Steve Howe had joined and attended; Colton mixed the song using "a crappy pair of cans that did not reproduce bass", rather than using the studio's monitoring equipment. Colton asked for more bass, but Squire and Howe noticed that the bass levels on the monitors were already high. In 1995, Offord said that he too thought Colton had not been the right person to produce the band at that time.

The album's six original tracks are credited to Anderson with either Squire or David Foster, Anderson's former bandmate in The Warriors. Banks said he made contributions to the writing of the album, but his name was not included in the credits. It did not bother him at first, but it caused some discontent years later when he missed out on royalties. Time and a Word marked a development in Anderson's lyric content, who began to move from simple love themes to topics of greater scale, described by band biographer Dan Hedges as "life, oneness and the future".

== Songs ==
"No Opportunity Necessary, No Experience Needed", the album's opening track, was written by American artist Richie Havens. It opens with an orchestral theme taken from the soundtrack to the 1958 Western film The Big Country by Jerome Moross.

Anderson wrote "The Prophet" which tells the story of a man, followed by many, who tells the others to find and believe in themselves and not follow "like sheep". The song borrows a theme from "Jupiter, the Bringer of Jollity" from The Planets suite by English composer Gustav Holst and shows Anderson incorporating other themes from classical music, to which he listened regularly.

"Sweet Dreams" was particularly liked by future Yes guitarist Trevor Rabin, who requested that the band perform the song in concert during the 90125 tour in 1984. However, other than a performance in Champaign, the track is not known to have been performed during the tour.

Anderson, who was still musically naïve, presented the basic theme of “Time and a Word” to the group on a guitar, using only two or three chords, leaving the other band members trying to discern what he was playing. The song was recorded with Foster on acoustic guitar. Again, Banks didn't agree and claimed it was not meant to be part of the final mix, having been intended only as a guide track. On the final version, Banks played his parts over Foster's.

Yes also recorded "Dear Father" at Advision Studios, but decided not to include the track on the album. It was released as the B-side of the "Sweet Dreams" single, but only received an album release when it was included on the 1975 compilation Yesterdays.

== Cover ==
The sleeve for the album's original UK pressing was designed and photographed by Laurence Sackman and co-ordinated by Graphreaks. The front cover features a black-and-white Dada-esque chequered design and a nude woman, while the back cover included photographs of each member in front of a wind machine, distorting their faces. The front cover art was deemed inappropriate by the American record distributors, so Atlantic Records arranged for photographer Barrie Wentzell, at his Wardour Street studio in London, to take a new photo of the band for use on the US printing. By the time the photograph was taken, Steve Howe had replaced Peter Banks as Yes' guitarist, so Howe appears on the American version of the album cover. However, the back of the US record sleeve is identical to the UK version, so it includes a picture of Banks. Howe has said that the original album cover was rejected because it was sexist, but that he was angry at Atlantic Records for continually printing and selling an album with his photo on the cover even though he did not play on the record. The cover of the compilation album Yesterdays painted by Roger Dean, which was released in America, was a homage to the cover of this album. It featured a nude woman in the same pose, with her head not being visible, and with a black butterfly on her hip, just as on Time and a Word.

== Release and reception ==
Professional ratings
Review scores
Source	Rating
AllMusic	2/5 stars
Christgau's Record Guide	C
The Rolling Stone Album Guide	2/5 stars

Yes premiered most of Time and a Word during their two solo concerts at the Queen Elizabeth Hall in London, on 21 and 22 March 1970. For the second half, they played songs from the album with a twenty-piece orchestra led by Tony Cox. Anderson later considered the shows a failure, due to a lack of rehearsal time and a poor sound system. To record the orchestra, microphones were left dangling above the players using coat hangers. Banks thought the experiment was a "daft idea". Nevertheless, Chris Welch wrote a positive review in Melody Maker noting that despite the amplification problems, the "musical break-through" reaction from the audience suggested to him that the group had "arrived". The shows were the last in which Yes performed with an orchestra, until the 2001 Symphonic Tour to support their nineteenth studio album Magnification, which also featured orchestral arrangements.

Tensions within the band increased, and just after the album's recording was completed in early 1970, Banks was asked to leave. Steve Howe would join the line-up as a replacement that June.

Following the UK release of Time and a Word in July 1970, the album became the group's first to enter the UK Albums Chart, with a peak at number 45. Its US release followed in November 1970. Two singles were released: "Time and a Word" in March 1970 and "Sweet Dreams" in June 1970. The album sold no more copies than did the debut album Yes, which led management at Atlantic to consider dropping the band from the label. Carson managed to convince them to withdraw the notice, by which time the band had recruited Howe and secured Brian Lane as their new manager.

The album received a mixed reception. It received an enthusiastic review by Roy Carr in New Musical Express in August 1970, which hailed it as one of the best releases of the year. To the reviewer, its material was "mentally exhilarating", and "No Opportunity Necessary, No Experience Needed" set the standard and mood of the remaining seven tracks. Cox's arrangements were praised, which blended well with the group's ability "to perform intricate and highly complex ensemble passages with meticulous dexterity and precision". The review credited the band's instrumental strength from Squire's "identifiable" bass playing, which created a "formidable" rhythm section when paired with Bruford's "expertise" with drumming.

In an October interview with Beat Instrumental, Bruford expressed his approval of Time and a Word, believing that it was an improvement over their self-titled debut. He described the album as more cohesive and felt that the songs "rock[ed] more".

== Reissues ==
- 1989 – Atlantic – CD
- 1994 – Atlantic – CD (remastered)
- 2003 – Rhino – CD (remastered, with bonus tracks)

== Track listing ==
Side one
No.	Title	Writer(s)	Length
1.	"No Opportunity Necessary, No Experience Needed"	Richie Havens, John Court	4:45
2.	"Then"	Jon Anderson	5:42
3.	"Everydays"	Stephen Stills	6:05
4.	"Sweet Dreams"	Anderson, David Foster	3:46

Side two
No.	Title	Writer(s)	Length
5.	"The Prophet"	Anderson, Chris Squire	6:31
6.	"Clear Days"	Anderson	2:03
7.	"Astral Traveller"	Anderson	5:47
8.	"Time and a Word"	Anderson, Foster	4:29

2003 bonus tracks
No.	Title	Writer(s)	Length
9.	"Dear Father" (Single B-Side)	Anderson, Squire	4:12
10.	"No Opportunity Necessary, No Experience Needed" (Original Mix)	Havens, Court	4:42
11.	"Sweet Dreams" (Original Mix)	Anderson, Foster	4:19
12.	"The Prophet" (Single Version)	Anderson, Squire	6:33

Note: Tracks 9–11 first appeared on early German LP issues of Time and a Word.

== Personnel ==
Credits are adapted from the album's 1970 and 2003 liner notes.

Yes

- Jon Anderson – lead vocals, percussion
- Peter Banks – electric and acoustic guitars, backing vocals
- Chris Squire – bass, backing vocals
- Tony Kaye – Hammond organ, piano
- Bill Bruford – drums, percussion

Additional personnel

- David Foster – vocals on "Sweet Dreams", acoustic guitar on "Time and a Word"
- Tony Cox – orchestration, conductor
- Royal College of Music students – brass, strings

Technical personnel

- Tony Colton – producer
- Eddie Offord – engineer
- Loring Eutemey – cover design (US cover)
- Barrie Wentzell – photograph (UK cover)
- Laurence Sackman – photographs and design
- Graphreaks – design co-ordination

== Charts ==
Chart (1970)	Peak position
UK Albums (Official Charts)	45

== Sources ==
- Hedges, Dan (1982). Yes: An Authorized Biography. Sidgwick & Jackson. ISBN 978-0-283-98751-9.
- Kirkman, John (2013). Time and a Word: The Yes Interviews. Rufus Publications.
- Morse, Tim (1996). Yesstories: "Yes" in Their Own Words. St. Martin's Press. ISBN 978-0-312-14453-1.
- Welch, Chris (2008). Close to the Edge – The Story of Yes. Omnibus Press. ISBN 978-1-84772-132-7.
