= Mabel Greer's Toyshop =

British band

- Origin: London, England
- Genres: Psychedelic rock; progressive rock
- Years active: 1966–1968; 2014–present
- Labels: Edifying; HBM - Hagger Bayley Music Limited
- Spinoffs: Yes
- Members: Clive Bayley; Bob Hagger; Hugo Barre; Max Hunt
- Past members: Paul Rutledge; Chris Squire; Peter Banks; Jon Anderson; Bill Bruford; Tony Kaye; Billy Sherwood
- Website: mabelgreerstoyshop.com

Mabel Greer's Toyshop are an English psychedelic and progressive rock band formed in London in 1966 by guitarist/vocalist Clive Bayley, drummer Robert Hagger, and bassist Paul Rutledge. The band has two distinct phases in its history; the first period is characterised by a combination of psychedelic, American blues, and classically influenced arrangements with poetic lyrics. It lasted until June 1968, when Bayley and Hagger left, and the remaining members formed Yes.

In 2013, Bayley and Hagger reconnected for the first time in 45 years following the death of former member Peter Banks. They revived Mabel Greer's Toyshop, in the following year with Hugo Barré and Yes alumni Tony Kaye and Billy Sherwood, and released two studio albums and one compilation.

== History ==
=== 1966–1968: First incarnation ===
Mabel Greer's Toyshop was formed in London in 1966 by guitarist and vocalist Clive Bayley, drummer Robert Hagger, and bassist Paul Rutledge. Bayley and Hagger first met in a pub on Fleet Street after one of them placed an ad looking for band work in the Melody Maker. They brought in Rutledge, who was also a student at art school. Hagger came up with their name, and took inspiration from themes presented in Alice in Wonderland combined with the band wanting to pursue adventurous music. He has since apologised to Bayley "many times" over it.

The band played mostly original material composed by Bayley with covers of various contemporary musicians. Bayley described the group's sound during this period as a crossover between Pink Floyd and the Byrds, with strong melody lines and harmonies and extended improvised sections. Hagger considered the band at the forefront of psychedelic music at the time with use of fuzzboxes, wah-wah pedals, and the feedback. At the end of 1967, Rutledge left the group to pursue art full-time and was replaced by Chris Squire of The Syn, who had once invited Hagger to an audition. Not long after Squire brought guitarist and former Syn bandmate Peter Banks into the fold, becoming a four-piece. Squire's arrival was key in the group's development, as his connections at The Marquee club helped the band secure gigs at more famous venues, such as Happening 44 and UFO, and support The Nice and The Who. After meeting influential radio DJ John Peel at the Middle Earth club, they recorded some tracks for Peel's BBC radio shows Top Gear and Night Ride which were released on Banks's compilation The Roots of Yes. The band also produced demos with producer Mike Leander for MCA Records.

In May 1968, Squire met former Warriors vocalist Jon Anderson, who began to co-write songs and perform as lead vocalist. Later that month, Hagger left the band to join Heaven and was replaced by Bill Bruford, who on 7 June, played his first gig with the band just hours after meeting them. In July, following a period of rehearsals in Soho, Tony Kaye joined on keyboards and Banks, who had left Mabel Greer for a month, came back to replace a departing Bailey. The now five-piece line-up named themselves Yes, at Banks's suggestion.

=== 2013–present: Reformation ===
In March 2013, Hagger learned of Banks's death on a flight from Dubai to Johannesburg, which prompted him to contact Bayley for the first time in 45 years. The pair met at a restaurant in Nice, France that July, where they agreed to revive Mabel Greer's Toyshop and book studio time to work on songs. The band reformed in 2014 with bassist Hugo Barré and former Yes album members Kaye and Billy Sherwood, and Squire gave his blessing on the project before he died in 2015. The first studio album, New Way of Life, was released in 2015 and contains songs by Bayley and Squire originally written in 1967 and 1968, plus new original material. This was followed by The Secret in 2017, of which the title track was written and recorded to honour Banks, whose guitar work is featured.

== Discography ==
Studio albums

- New Way of Life (2015)
- The Secret (2017)

Compilations

- Images (2016, remaster of recordings from 1967–1968)

== Personnel ==
Current members

- Clive Bayley – vocals, guitar (1966–1968, 2014–present)
- Robert Hagger – drums (1966–1968, 2014–present)
- Hugo Barré – bass guitar (2014–present)
- Max Hunt – keyboards (2014–present)

Former members

- Paul Rutledge – bass guitar (1966–1967)
- Chris Squire – bass guitar (1967–1968)
- Peter Banks – guitar (1967–1968, 1968)
- Tony Kaye – keyboards (1968, 2014)
- Jon Anderson – lead vocals (1968)
- Bill Bruford – drums (1968)
- Billy Sherwood – bass guitar (2014)
