= Chris Welch =

British journalist

- Born: 1941 or 1942 (age 83–84); Catford, London, England
- Occupations: Music journalist; critic

Chris Welch (born 1941 or 1942) is an English music journalist, critic, and author who is best known for his work from the late 1960s as a reporter for Melody Maker, Musicians Only, and Kerrang!. He is the author of over 40 music books.

== Early life ==
Welch was raised in Catford, south east London. He left school at 16 and became a messenger for a national daily newspaper in Fleet Street.

== Career ==
In 1960, Welch started work for The Kentish Times. In October 1964, after writing for a local newspaper, Welch became a reporter for Melody Maker at age 22. His first interview was with the Yardbirds with Eric Clapton. He was later assistant editor of Musicians Only, editor of Metal Hammer, and a contributor to The Independent and Rhythm magazine. He has written books on several rock music personalities, including Paul McCartney, the Who, Pink Floyd, Jimi Hendrix, Yes, Steve Winwood, Black Sabbath, John Bonham, Led Zeppelin, Peter Grant, Cream, Vivian Stanshall, and Genesis. He has also written liner notes for many rock albums.

On 17 October 2012 Welch was presented with a BASCA Gold Badge Award in recognition of his unique contribution to music.

== Published works ==
- Hendrix: A Biography by Chris Welch SBN 855140259 (1972)
- Adam & The Ants ISBN 0-352-30963-6 (1981)
- Black Sabbath ISBN 0-86276-015-1 (1982)
- Led Zeppelin: The Book ISBN 0-86276-113-1 (1984)
- Paul McCartney: The Definitive Biography ISBN 0-86276-126-3 (1984)
- Power and Glory: Jimmy Page and Robert Plant ISBN 5-551-35290-0 (1985)
- Def Leppard: An Illustrated Biography ISBN 0-86276-263-4 (1986)
- Take You Higher: The Tina Turner Story ISBN 0-491-03951-4 (1986)
- The Tina Turner Experience ISBN 0-86379-138-7 (1987)
- Pink Floyd: Learning to Fly ISBN 1-898141-70-3 (1994)
- Cream: Strange Brew ISBN 1-898141-80-0 (1994)
- The Complete Guide to the Music of Genesis ISBN 0-7119-5428-3 (1995)
- The Who: Teenage Wasteland ISBN 1-898141-18-5 (1995)
- Dazed and Confused: The Story Behind Every Led Zeppelin Song ISBN 1-85868-340-8 (1998)
- The Secret Life of Peter Gabriel ISBN 0-7119-6812-8 (1998)
- Changes: The Story Behind Every David Bowie Song, 1970–1980 ISBN 1-85868-810-8 (1999)
- Cream ISBN 0-87930-624-6 (2000)
- John Bonham: A Thunder of Drums (with Geoff Nicholls) ISBN 0-87930-658-0 (2001)
- Ginger Geezer: The Life of Vivian Stanshall (with Lucian Randall) ISBN 1-84115-679-5 (2002)
- Peter Grant: The Man Who "Led Zeppelin" ISBN 0-7119-9195-2 (2002)
- Close to the Edge – The Story of Yes ISBN 0-7119-9509-5 (2003)
- Genesis: Complete Guide to Their Music ISBN 1-84449-868-9 (2005)
- Led Zeppelin: Experience The Biggest Band Of The 70s ISBN 978-1-78097-000-4 (2014)
