= Yes discography =

Recordings by English rock band

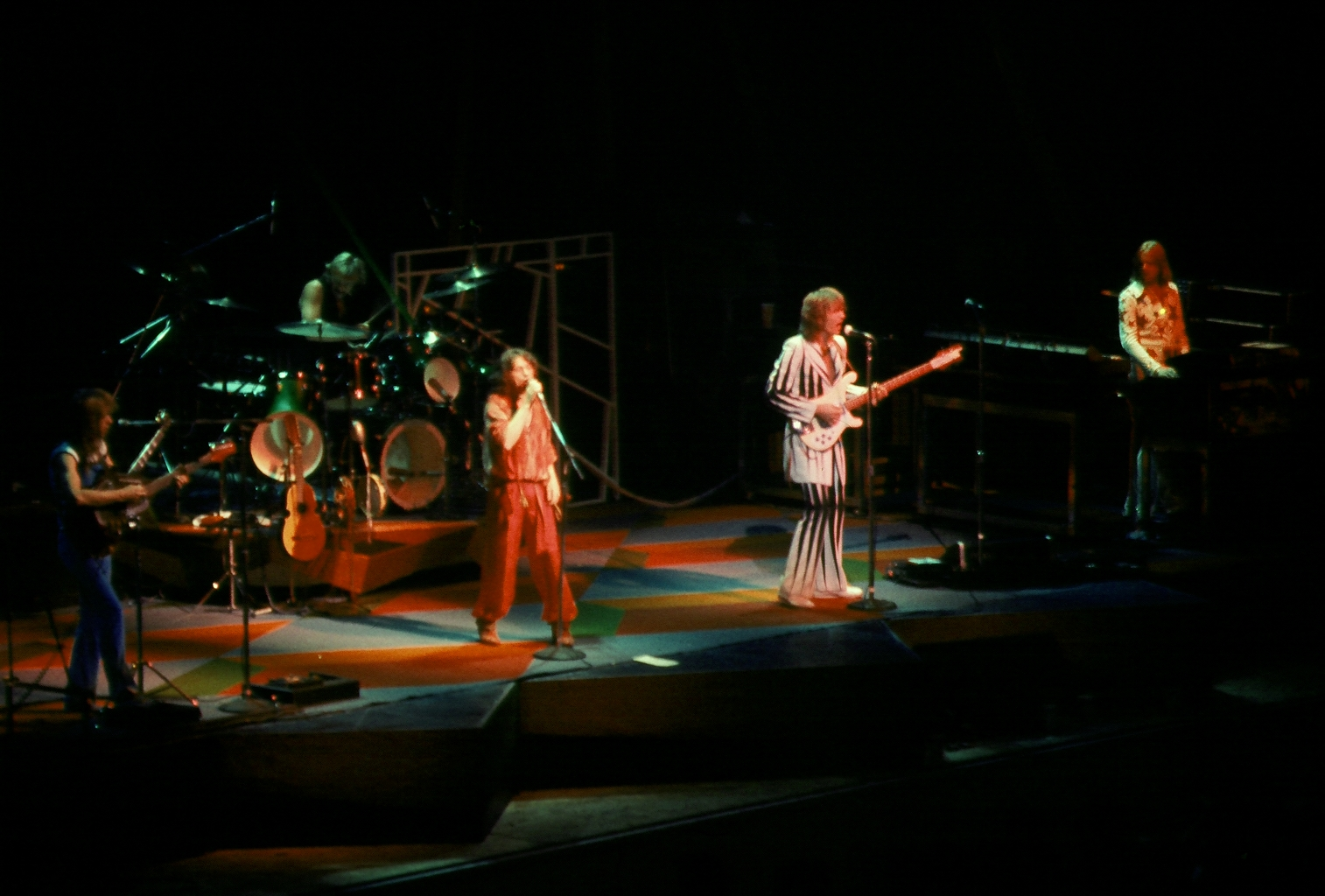
- Yes in 1977
- Studio albums: 25
- Extended plays: 1
- Live albums: 18
- Compilation albums: 15
- Singles: 44
- Video albums: 22
- Music videos: 23

This is a discography of the English progressive rock band Yes. Over the course of their career they have released 25 studio albums, 18 live albums, 15 compilation albums, 44 singles and 23 music videos.

== Albums ==
=== Studio albums ===
Title	Album details	Peak chart positions										Certifications
Title	Album details	UK	AUS	CAN	GER	JPN	NLD	NOR	SWE	SWI	US	Certifications
Yes	Released: 25 July 1969; Label: Atlantic	—	—	—	—	—	—	—	—	—	—	
Time and a Word	Released: 24 July 1970; Label: Atlantic	45	—	—	—	—	—	—	—	—	—	
The Yes Album	Released: 19 February 1971; Label: Atlantic	4	—	46	—	—	7	—	—	—	40	UK: Silver; US: Platinum
Fragile	Released: 12 November 1971; Label: Atlantic	7	29	6	—	22	8	—	—	—	4	UK: Platinum; CAN: Platinum; US: 2× Platinum
Close to the Edge	Released: 8 September 1972; Label: Atlantic	4	21	7	36	16	1	—	—	—	3	CAN: Platinum; UK: Platinum; US: Platinum
Tales from Topographic Oceans	Released: 7 December 1973; Label: Atlantic	1	13	4	26	8	8	8	—	—	6	UK: Gold; SWI: Gold; US: Gold
Relayer	Released: 29 November 1974; Label: Atlantic	4	15	22	27	37	10	18	—	—	5	FRA: Gold; US: Gold
Going for the One	Released: 12 July 1977; Label: Atlantic	1	16	8	6	20	9	7	10	—	8	UK: Gold; CAN: Gold; FRA: Gold; US: Gold
Tormato	Released: 22 September 1978; Label: Atlantic	8	22	30	36	41	17	9	18	—	10	UK: Gold; CAN: Gold; US: Platinum
Drama	Released: 22 August 1980; Label: Atlantic	2	69	41	50	78	18	11	19	—	18	UK: Silver
90125	Released: 7 November 1983; Label: Atco	16	27	3	2	9	4	8	7	3	5	UK: Gold; CAN: 2× Platinum; FRA: Gold; GER: Platinum; JPN: Platinum; US: 3× Platinum
Big Generator	Released: 28 September 1987; Label: Atco	17	44	14	25	14	18	—	14	22	15	CAN: Platinum; JPN: Gold; US: Platinum
Union	Released: 30 April 1991; Label: Arista	7	—	15	15	11	17	—	32	16	15	US: Gold
Talk	Released: 21 March 1994; Label: Victory Music	20	—	47	45	17	47	—	31	29	33	
Keys to Ascension	Released: 28 October 1996; Label: Essential	48	—	—	—	99	—	—	—	—	56	
Keys to Ascension 2	Released: 3 November 1997; Label: Essential	62	—	—	—	—	—	—	—	—	169	
Open Your Eyes	Released: 24 November 1997; Label: Eagle	—	—	—	—	81	—	—	—	—	151	
The Ladder	Released: 20 September 1999; Label: Eagle	36	—	—	38	38	70	—	—	—	99	
Magnification	Released: 10 September 2001; Label: Eagle	71	—	—	64	—	81	—	—	—	186	
Fly from Here	Released (original version): 22 June 2011; Released ("Return Trip" version): 25 March 2018; Label: Frontiers	30	—	—	16	56	43	24	31	39	36	
Heaven & Earth	Released: 16 July 2014; Label: Frontiers	20	—	—	23	37	41	—	—	29	26	
From a Page	Released (mini-album): 25 October 2019; Released ("Deluxe" double album): 24 April 2026; Label: Yes 97 LLC/Mercury Studios	—	—	—	—	72	—	—	—	—	—	
The Quest	Released: 1 October 2021; Label: Inside Out Music	20	—	—	7	46	54	38	—	5	—	
Mirror to the Sky	Released: 19 May 2023; Label: Inside Out Music	30	—	—	12	24	84	—	—	9	—	
Aurora	Released: 12 June 2026; Label: Inside Out Music	42	—	—	8	27	—	—	—	12	—	
"—" denotes releases that did not chart or were not released in that territory.

=== Live albums ===
Title	Album details	Peak chart positions										Certifications
Title	Album details	UK	UK Rock	AUS	CAN	GER	ITA	NLD	NOR	SWI	US	Certifications
Yessongs	Released: 4 May 1973; Recorded: 1972; Label: Atlantic	7	—	8	8	28	9	—	—	—	12	CAN: Gold; GER: Gold; SWI: Gold; US: Platinum
Yesshows	Released: 24 November 1980; Recorded: 1976-1980; Label: Atlantic	22	—	—	—	—	—	—	43	—	43	UK: Silver
9012Live: The Solos	Released: 7 November 1985; Recorded: 1984; Label: Atco	44	—	—	88	—	—	—	—	—	81	
Something's Coming: The BBC Recordings 1969–1970	Released: 14 October 1997; Recorded: 1969-1970; Label: New Millennium Communications	—	—	—	—	—	—	—	—	—	—	
House of Yes: Live from House of Blues	Released: 25 September 2000; Recorded: 1999; Label: Eagle	—	—	—	—	—	—	—	—	—	—	
Symphonic Live	Released: 18 June 2002; Recorded: 2001; Label: Eagle	—	—	—	—	—	—	—	—	—	—	
The Word Is Live	Released: 23 August 2005; Recorded: 1970-1988; Label: Rhino	—	—	—	—	—	—	—	—	—	—	
Live at Montreux 2003	Released: 3 September 2007; Recorded: 2003; Label: Eagle	—	—	—	—	—	—	—	—	—	—	
Union Live	Released: 6 January 2011; Recorded: 1991; Label: Voiceprint	—	—	—	—	—	—	—	—	—	—	
In the Present – Live from Lyon	Released: 29 November 2011; Recorded: 2009; Label: Frontiers	—	—	—	—	—	—	—	—	—	—	
Songs from Tsongas	Released: 22 September 2014; Recorded: 2004; Label: Image Entertainment	—	11	—	—	—	—	—	—	—	—	
Like It Is: Yes at the Bristol Hippodrome	Released: 8 December 2014; Recorded: 2014; Label: Frontiers	—	15	—	—	—	—	—	—	—	—	
Progeny: Seven Shows from Seventy-Two	Released: 25 May 2015; Recorded: 1972; Label: Rhino	64	6	—	—	57	48	—	—	—	—	
Like It Is: Yes at the Mesa Arts Center	Released: 3 July 2015; Recorded: 2014; Label: Frontiers	—	21	—	—	96	—	83	—	—	—	
Topographic Drama – Live Across America	Released: 24 November 2017; Recorded: 2017; Label: Rhino	—	8	—	—	—	—	—	—	—	—	
Yes 50 Live	Released: 2 August 2019; Recorded: 2018; Label: Rhino	—	—	—	—	62	83	—	—	84	—	
The Royal Affair Tour: Live from Las Vegas	Released: 30 October 2020; Recorded: 2019; Label: BMG	—	6	—	—	—	—	—	—	—	—	
Union 30 Live	Released: 18 October 2021; Recorded: 1991-1992; Label: Gonzo Multimedia	—	—	—	—	—	—	—	—	—	—	
Yale Bowl '71	Released: 20 April 2024; Recorded: 1971; Label: Rhino	—	—	—	—	—	—	—	—	—	—	
Live at the Rainbow London, England 12/16/1972	Released: 12 April 2025; Recorded: 16 December 1972; Label: Rhino	—	—	—	—	—	—	—	—	—	—	
Tales From Topographic Tours	Released: 4 April 2026; Recorded: 1973-1974; Label: Rhino	—	—	—	—	—	—	—	—	—	—	
Roosevelt Stadium, Jersey City, NJ, 17 June 1976	Released: 17 July 2026; Recorded: 17 June 1976; Label: Rhino	—	—	—	—	—	—	—	—	—	—	
"—" denotes releases that did not chart or were not released in that territory.

=== Compilation albums ===
Title	Album details	Peak chart positions						Certifications
Title	Album details	UK	UK Rock	AUS	CAN	GER	US	Certifications
Yesterdays	Released: 28 February 1975; Label: Atlantic	27	—	31	13	—	17	
Classic Yes	Released: 11 December 1981; Label: Atlantic	—	—	—	—	—	142	UK: Silver; US: Platinum
Yesyears	Released: 5 August 1991; Label: Atco	—	—	—	—	—	—	
Yesstory	Released: 30 September 1991; Label: Atco	—	—	—	—	—	—	
Highlights: The Very Best of Yes	Released: 21 September 1993; Label: Atlantic	—	—	—	—	—	—	US: Gold
Keystudio	Released: 21 May 2001; Label: Castle Music	—	—	—	—	—	—	
In a Word	Released: 30 July 2002; Label: Rhino	—	—	—	—	—	—	
Yes Remixes	Released: 8 July 2003; Label: Rhino	—	—	—	—	—	—	
The Ultimate Yes: 35th Anniversary Collection	Released: 28 July 2003; Label: Rhino	10	3	82	—	—	131	UK: Gold
Essentially Yes	Released: 14 November 2006; Label: Eagle	—	—	—	—	—	—	
High Vibration	Released: 18 September 2013; Label: Warner	—	—	—	—	—	—	
The Studio Albums 1969–1987	Released: 6 December 2013; Label: Rhino	—	37	—	—	—	—	
The Steven Wilson Remixes	Released: 28 June 2018; Label: Rhino	—	19	—	—	86	—	
Yessingles	Released: 6 October 2023; Label: Rhino	—	—	—	—	—	—	
Yessingles 2	Released: 25 October 2024; Label: Rhino	—	—	—	—	—	—	
"—" denotes releases that did not chart or were not released in that territory.

== Singles ==
Year	Title	Peak chart position						Certifications	Album
Year	Title	UK	AUS	IRL	NLD	US	US Rock	Certifications	Album
1969	"Sweetness"	—				—			Yes
1969	"Looking Around"	—							Yes
1970	"Time and a Word" (Note: released in UK only)	—							Time and a Word
1970	"Sweet Dreams"	—			—				Time and a Word
1971	"Your Move"		32		—	40			The Yes Album
1971	"Yours Is No Disgrace" (Note: released in NL and ITA)				—				The Yes Album
1972	"Roundabout"		—		27	13			Fragile
1972	"Something's Coming" (Note: released in NL. Recorded in 1969)				—				Non-album singles
1972	"America"		—		—	46			Non-album singles
1972	"And You and I" (Note: UK release in 1974, chart position is from the official UK "Breakers List")		—		—	42			Close to the Edge
1973	"And You and I" (live) (Note: released in France)								Yessongs
1975	"Soon"					—			Relayer
1977	"Wonderous Stories"	7	—	6	—	—			Going for the One
1977	"Going for the One"	24		16					Going for the One
1978	"Don't Kill the Whale"	36	—		—	—			Tormato
1978	"Release Release" (Note: released in the US and Canada)					—			Tormato
1980	"Into the Lens"	—			—	104			Drama
1981	"Run Through the Light" (Note: released in US and CAN)					—			Drama
1983	"Owner of a Lonely Heart" (Note: re-released in 1991) – b/w "Our Song" [airplay]	28 —	14 —	30 —	7 —	1 —	1; 32	BPI: Silver; RMNZ: Gold	90125
1983	"Changes" [airplay]						6		90125
1984	"Leave It"	56	—		—	24	3		90125
1984	"Hold On" [airplay]						43		90125
1984	"It Can Happen"	92	—	—	—	51	5		90125
1985	"Hold On" (live) [promo]						27		9012Live: The Solos
1987	"Love Will Find a Way"	73	80		—	30	1		Big Generator
1987	"Shoot High Aim Low" [airplay]						11		Big Generator
1987	"Rhythm of Love"		—		—	40	2		Big Generator
1988	"Final Eyes" [airplay]						20		Big Generator
1991	"Lift Me Up"	—	—		—	86	1		Union
1991	"Saving My Heart"	97					9		Union
1991	"I Would Have Waited Forever" [promo]						49		Union
1991	"Make It Easy"		—			—	36		Yesyears
1994	"The Calling"				—		3		Talk
1994	"Walls" [promo]						24		Talk
1997	"Open Your Eyes" [promo]						33		Open Your Eyes
1999	"Homeworld (The Ladder)"					—			The Ladder
1999	"Lightning Strikes" (Note: released in UK)	—							The Ladder
2000	"If Only You Knew"					—			The Ladder
2011	"We Can Fly"	—	—	—	—	—	—		Fly from Here
2021	"The Ice Bridge"	—	—	—	—	—	—		The Quest
2021	"Dare to Know"	—	—	—	—	—	—		The Quest
2021	"Future Memories"	—	—	—	—	—	—		The Quest
2023	"Cut from the Stars"	—	—	—	—	—	—		Mirror to the Sky
2023	"All Connected"	—	—	—	—	—	—		Mirror to the Sky
2026	"Aurora"	—	—	—	—	—	—		Aurora
2026	"Turnaround Situation"	—	—	—	—	—	—		Aurora

== Videography ==
=== Music videos ===
Year	Song	Album
1970	"Everydays"	Time and a Word
1970	"Then"	Time and a Word
1970	"No Opportunity Necessary, No Experience Needed"	Time and a Word
1970	"Astral Traveler"	Time and a Word
1977	"Wonderous Stories"	Going for the One
1978	"Don't Kill the Whale"	Tormato
1978	"Madrigal"	Tormato
1980	"Tempus Fugit"	Drama
1980	"Into the Lens"	Drama
1983	"Owner of a Lonely Heart"	90125
1984	"Leave It"	90125
1984	"It Can Happen"	90125
1985	"Hold On" (Live)	9012Live: The Solos
1987	"Rhythm of Love"	Big Generator
1987	"Love Will Find a Way"	Big Generator
1991	"Lift Me Up"	Union
2001	"Don't Go"	Magnification
2011	"We Can Fly"	Fly from Here
2021	"The Ice Bridge"	The Quest
2021	"Dare to Know"	The Quest
2021	"Future Memories"	The Quest
2022	"A Living Island"	The Quest
2023	"Cut from the Stars"	Mirror to the Sky
2023	"All Connected"	Mirror to the Sky
2023	"Circles of Time"	Mirror to the Sky
2026
2026	"Aurora"	Aurora
2026	"Turnaround Situation"	Aurora

=== Videos ===
Year	Title
1975	Yessongs
1985	9012Live
1991	Yesyears
1991	Greatest Video Hits
1993	Yes: Live – 1975 at Q.P.R.
1995	Live in Philadelphia
1996	Keys to Ascension
2000	House of Yes: Live from House of Blues
2002	Symphonic Live
2004	Yesspeak
2004	Yes Acoustic: Guaranteed No Hiss
2005	Songs from Tsongas
2007	Live at Montreux 2003
2007	Classic Artists: Yes
2008	Yesspeak Live: The Director's Cut
2009
2009	Rock of the '70s
2011	Union Live
2011	In the Present – Live from Lyon
2014	Live Hemel Hempstead Pavilion October 3rd 1971
2014	Like It Is: Yes at the Bristol Hippodrome
2015	Like It Is: Yes at the Mesa Arts Center

== Other member appearances ==
Members of Yes have collaborated in a number of other albums and singles. The list includes releases with at least three (current or former) Yes members, and excludes releases by the Yes offshoots Yes Featuring Jon Anderson, Trevor Rabin, Rick Wakeman and Anderson Bruford Wakeman Howe.

- 1973: The Six Wives of Henry VIII by Rick Wakeman, with appearances by Squire, Howe, White and Bruford
- 1973: E.H. in the U.K., by Eddie Harris, with appearances by Squire, White and Kaye
- 1975: Fish Out of Water, by Chris Squire, with appearances by Bruford and Moraz
- 1975: Beginnings, by Steve Howe, with appearances by Bruford, White and Moraz
- 1976: Ramshackled, by Alan White, with appearances by Anderson and Howe
- 1977: Rick Wakeman's Criminal Record, by Rick Wakeman, with appearances by Squire and White
- 1979: The Steve Howe Album, by Steve Howe, with appearances by Bruford, White and Moraz
- 1984: Welcome to the Pleasuredome, by Frankie Goes to Hollywood, with Horn, Howe and Rabin
- 1986: Liverpool, by Frankie Goes to Hollywood, with Horn, Howe and Rabin
- 1989: Anderson Bruford Wakeman and Howe album, Arista
- 1991: The Classical Connection II by Rick Wakeman, including an archival track with Squire, Bruford and Howe
- 1995: Tales from Yesterday, a Yes tribute album, with appearances by Howe, Banks, Moraz and Sherwood
- 1999: Encore, Legends, & Paradox, produced by Robert Berry and drummer Trent Gardner, with 10 covers of ELP by multiple musicians including Banks, Khoroshev and Downes
- 2000: Conspiracy by Chris Squire & Billy Sherwood, with White on 2 tracks
- 2002: Pigs & Pyramids-An All Star Lineup Performing The Songs Of Pink Floyd – track 3 "Comfortably Numb" performed by Squire, White and Sherwood, while Sherwood and Kaye appear on other tracks
- 2005: Back Against the Wall, a Pink Floyd tribute, produced by Billy Sherwood, with Squire, Howe, White, R Wakeman, Kaye, Sherwood and Downes, among others
- 2006: Return to the Dark Side of the Moon, a Pink Floyd tribute, produced by Billy Sherwood, with R Wakeman, Howe, Kaye, White, Bruford, Banks and Downes, among others
- 2007: CIRCA: 2007, by CIRCA:, including Sherwood, Kaye and White; also including material co-written by Rabin
- 2007: From Here to Infinity, a project led by Billy Sherwood including appearances by Kaye, R Wakeman, Howe and White on a cover of Yes' "Starship Trooper"
- 2008: Led Box: The Ultimate Tribute to Led Zeppelin, with Sherwood, Kaye, R Wakeman and Downes, among others
- 2009: Abbey Road: A Tribute to The Beatles, produced by Billy Sherwood, with Kaye, White and Downes, among others
- 2012: Songs of the Century: An All-Star Tribute to Supertramp, a tribute album organised by Sherwood, with appearances by Squire, Kaye, R Wakeman, Banks and Downes, among others
- 2012: The Prog Collective, a project led by Billy Sherwood including appearances by Squire, Banks, R Wakeman and Kaye, among others
- 2012: The Fusion Syndicate, a project led by Billy Sherwood including appearances by R Wakeman and Kaye, among others
- 2012: A Spoonful of Time, by Nektar, with appearances by Howe, Moraz, R Wakeman, Downes and Sherwood, among others
- 2012: Who Are You: An All Star Tribute to The Who, a tribute album with appearances by R Wakeman, Banks and Sherwood, among others
- 2013: Epilogue by The Prog Collective, a project led by Sherwood, with Squire, Moraz and others
- 2013: In Extremis, by Days Between Stations, with Sherwood, R Wakeman and Banks
- 2014: Light My Fire – A Classic Rock Salute to The Doors, a The Doors tribute, produced by Billy Sherwood, with Howe, R Wakeman, Kaye, Moraz and Downes, among others
- 2015: Citizen, by Billy Sherwood, with Squire, R Wakeman, Kaye, Downes, Moraz and Davison
- 2018: Be Well, Be Safe, Be Lucky... The Anthology, by Peter Banks, with Kaye and Sherwood
- 2018: "Difference" (single), by Edison's Lab (produced by Bill Duncan, Kurt Schweizer, Wendy Wood, Billy Sherwood and Jon Davison), with Kaye, Sherwood and Davison
- 2018: A Life in Yes: The Chris Squire Tribute, with Sherwood, Kaye, Davison and Moraz, among others
- 2018: Yesterday and Today: A 50th Anniversary Tribute to Yes by Dave Kerzner & Sonic Elements, with Sherwood, Kaye, Downes and Davison, among others
- 2019: 1000 Hands by Jon Anderson, with Squire, Howe and White, among others
- 2020: Crossover by David Cross & Peter Banks, with Banks, Kaye, Downes, Sherwood, O Wakeman
- 2020: A Tribute to Keith Emerson & Greg Lake, tribute album produced by Billy Sherwood, with Moraz, Davison and Downes
- 2020: Worlds on Hold by The Prog Collective, a project led by Sherwood, with Davison, Moraz and others
- 2021: A Tribute to Pink Floyd – Still Wish You Were Here by various artists, with R Wakeman, Moraz, Downes and others
- 2021: Animals Reimagined – A Tribute to Pink Floyd by various artists, with R Wakeman, Moraz, Sherwood, Davison and others
- 2022: Synthesizer Classics by various artists, with Downes, R Wakeman, Moraz and others
- 2022: Don't Look Down by Arc of Life, with Sherwood, Davison and Schellen
- 2022: Seeking Peace by The Prog Collective, a project led by Sherwood, with Davison, Moraz, Downes and others

== See also ==
- List of Yes band members
- List of Yes concert tours
