= Blindside =

Blindside, Blind Side or The Blind Side may refer to:

== Books ==
- The Blind Side: Evolution of a Game, a 2006 book about American football by Michael Lewis

== Films and television ==
- Blindside (film), a 1986 film starring Harvey Keitel
- Blind Side (1993 film), a 1993 made-for-television film starring Rebecca De Mornay
- The Blind Side (film), a 2009 film based on the Lewis book starring Sandra Bullock
- "The Blind Side" (Family Guy), a 2012 episode of the television show Family Guy

== Music ==
=== Albums ===
- Blindside (band), a 1994 Swedish post-hardcore band
  - Blindside (album), 1997
- Blindside, a 2016 album by Sister Grotto

=== Songs ===
- "Blind Side", a 2011 song and EP by Hybrid
- "Blindside", a song by Secrets on the 2012 album The Ascent
- "Blindside", a 2023 single by James Arthur

== See also ==
- "Blind side", a term in American and Canadian football for an area protected by a left or right tackle
- Blindside, a term used with similar meanings in rugby league and in rugby union
- Blindsided (disambiguation)
