= Lightning Strikes (Yes song) =

Single by Yes

from the album The Ladder
- B-side: "The Messenger" "Homeworld (The Ladder)"
- Released: 1999
- Recorded: February–May 1999
- Studio: Armoury Studios
- Length: 4:35 (full version); 3:54 (radio edit)
- Label: Eagle
- Songwriters: Jon Anderson, Igor Khoroshev, Steve Howe, Alan White, Chris Squire, Billy Sherwood
- Producer: Bruce Fairbairn

Yes singles chronology
"Homeworld (The Ladder)" (1999)	"Lightning Strikes" (1999)	"If Only You Knew" (2000)

"Lightning Strikes" is a song by the progressive rock band Yes, first released in 1999 as a single in promotion of the band's eighteenth studio album, The Ladder.

== Background and composition ==
"Lightning Strikes" contains the same Mellotron flute sample that "Phenomenal Cat" by The Kinks uses in the intro. Drummer Alan White had been experimenting with more "unusual jazz and African type" rhythms in the studio, playing them to front-man Jon Anderson. He then adapted some of his chords he had been working on as well as a melody which he wrote to fit it. Bassist Chris Squire was pleased with the final product and believed that the song encouraged the band to explore new musical territory.

== Reception ==
Bret Adams of AllMusic enjoyed the track, labeling Steve Howe's acoustic guitar playing as "bouncy" and stating that the song's biggest surprise was the inclusion of a horn section.

Jason Warburg of The Daily Vault praised the track. They noted the use of horns on the track and Howe's "strong riffs" on acoustic and electric guitar and highlighted keyboardist Igor Khoroshev's "lively" organs and synth runs. They also called White's and Squire's playing "cuban-flavored".

Writing for Progressiveworld, Stephanie Sollow noted the track's heavy Caribbean sound, stating that the track was the most upbeat on the record, being almost dance music.

== Track listing ==
No.	Title	Length
1.	"Lightning Strikes" (radio edit)	3:54
2.	"The Messenger"	5:12
3.	"Homeworld (The Ladder)"	9:32
Total length:		18:38

== Personnel ==
Credits are adapted from the album's liner notes.

Yes

- Jon Anderson – lead vocals
- Steve Howe – guitars, backing vocals
- Billy Sherwood – guitars, backing vocals
- Chris Squire – bass guitar, backing vocals
- Igor Khoroshev – keyboards
- Alan White – drums

Additional musicians

- Rhys Fulber – dance loops
- The Marguerita Horns – horns
  - Tom Keenlyside – piccolo, tenor saxophone
  - Derry Burns – trumpet
  - Rod Murray – trombone
  - Tom Colclough – alto saxophone
  - Neil Nicholson – tuba
