= Fly from Here (song series) =

Song with lyrics by Trevor Horn performed by Yes

Composition by Yes

from the album Fly from Here
- Released: 22 June 2011
- Genre: Song cycle
- Length: 23:49 (2011 version); 21:31 (2018 version)
- Label: Frontiers Records
- Songwriters: Trevor Horn, Geoff Downes, Chris Squire, Steve Howe
- Producer: Trevor Horn

"Fly from Here" is a set of songs by progressive rock band Yes from their 2011 album Fly from Here and its 2018 remixed edition Fly from Here – Return Trip. With a complete length of 23 minutes and 49 seconds, the original version of "Fly from Here" is the longest composition ever released by Yes, beating "The Solution" by two seconds, while the Return Trip re-recording is 21 minutes and 31 seconds long. (Note: The liner notes for Tales from Topographic Oceans, written by Jon Anderson, state that Tales is "a large-scale composition" divided into four movements. If Anderson's view is accepted, then Tales is an 81-minute composition, making it Yes' longest.) "Fly From Here" is split into six parts, consisting of the first tracks of the album: "Overture", "We Can Fly", "Sad Night at the Airfield", "Madman at the Screens", "Bumpy Ride" and "We Can Fly (Reprise)". Being the first recording of the album, it is the first Yes work to feature singer Benoît David.

The basis of the hexalogy was a demo originally recorded by Geoff Downes and Trevor Horn of The Buggles before they joined Yes in 1980, and it was the first song to be rehearsed by the new line-up, despite which it was never officially recorded by the band in a studio, although it was played several times live by the band in the 1980-81 Drama World Tour. After Yes disbanded in 1981, Horn and Downes recorded a second demo (published as bonus tracks in the 2010 release of Buggles' 1981 second album "Adventures in Modern Recording"), and both recordings became the foundation of the tracks "We Can Fly" and "Sad Night at the Airfield". A demo of "Madman at the Screens" was also written but it was never released. Chris Squire called it "the band's 11th epic-length piece, the first in 15 years".

== Other releases ==
A single uniting "We Can Fly" and "We Can Fly (Reprise)" was released under the title "We Can Fly". The single version received a music video, released on the 3rd of July, 2011.

In 2016, new vocals for "Fly From Here" were recorded by Trevor Horn. A new mix of the song, using Horn's vocals instead of David's, was released on Fly from Here – Return Trip in 2018.

== Personnel ==
=== Yes ===
- Benoît David – lead vocals (2011 edition)
- Chris Squire – bass, backing vocals
- Steve Howe – guitars, backing vocals
- Geoff Downes – keyboards
- Alan White – drums

=== Additional musicians ===
- Trevor Horn – lead vocals (2018 edition), backing vocals, additional keyboards, additional acoustic guitar on "Sad Night at the Airfield"
- Oliver Wakeman – additional keyboards on "We Can Fly", and "We Can Fly (Reprise)"
