= Live at Montreux 2003 =

Live album by Yes
- Released: 3 September 2007
- Recorded: 14 July 2003
- Venue: Auditorium Stravinsky (Montreux, Switzerland)
- Genre: Progressive rock, symphonic rock
- Length: 128:32 (2 CD version); 69:02 (1 CD version)
- Label: Eagle
- Producer: Yes

Yes chronology
| Essentially Yes (2006) | Live at Montreux 2003 (2007) | Union Live (2011) |

Yes video chronology
| Songs from Tsongas (2005) | Live at Montreux 2003 (2007) | Classic Artists: Yes (2007) |

Professional ratings
Review scores
| Source | Rating |
|---|---|
| AllMusic | 3.5/5 stars |

Live at Montreux 2003 is a 2007 live album and video from the English progressive rock band Yes. It is a live recording of the group's headlining concert at the Montreux Jazz Festival on 14 July 2003. The performance was filmed and is also available on DVD/Blu-ray.

This is the first official album to feature the classic line-up of lead vocalist Jon Anderson, guitarist Steve Howe, keyboardist Rick Wakeman, bassist Chris Squire and drummer Alan White since the 1996/1997 Keys to Ascension live albums, along with a DVD also entitled Keys to Ascension. The album was released in 2007, during a hiatus in the band's activity following a tour ending in 2004.

While Yes began offering USB thumb drive recordings of their concert performances in 2010, this was the most recent official live album by the band until In the Present – Live from Lyon 2 CD & 1 DVD album in 2011. The band's previous live release Symphonic Live (2002), was recorded at the Heineken Music Hall in Amsterdam on 22 November 2001, two years before Live at Montreux.

== Track listing ==
Single Disc Release
| No. | Title | Writer(s) | Length |
|---|---|---|---|
| 1. | "Siberian Khatru" | Jon Anderson, Steve Howe, Rick Wakeman | 10:12 |
| 2. | "Magnification" | Anderson, Howe, Chris Squire, Alan White | 6:53 |
| 3. | "Don't Kill The Whale" | Anderson, Squire | 4:29 |
| 4. | "In The Presence Of" | Anderson, Howe, Squire, White | 11:05 |
| 5. | "And You and I" | Anderson, Bruford, Howe, Squire | 11:23 |
| 6. | "Awaken" | Anderson, Howe | 19:20 |
| 7. | "I've Seen All Good People" | | 7:10 |

=== Double Disc Release ===
Disc One
| No. | Title | Writer(s) | Length |
|---|---|---|---|
| 1. | "Siberian Khatru" | Anderson, Howe, Wakeman | 10:12 |
| 2. | "Magnification" | Anderson, Howe, Squire, White | 6:53 |
| 3. | "Don't Kill The Whale" | Anderson, Squire | 4:29 |
| 4. | "In The Presence Of" | Anderson, Howe, Squire, White | 11:05 |
| 5. | "We Have Heaven" | Anderson | 1:34 |
| 6. | "South Side of the Sky" | Anderson, Squire, Wakeman | 9:35 |
| 7. | "And You and I" | Anderson, Bruford, Howe, Squire | 11:23 |
| 8. | "To Be Over" | Anderson, Howe, Patrick Moraz, Squire, White | 4:21 |
| 9. | "Clap" | Howe | 3:49 |

Disc Two
| No. | Title | Writer(s) | Length |
|---|---|---|---|
| 1. | "Show Me" | Anderson | 3:45 |
| 2. | "Rick Wakeman Solo Medley: Catherine Of Aragon/Catherine Howard/Montreux Jig/Jane Seymour" | Wakeman | 4:43 |
| 3. | "Heart of the Sunrise" | Anderson, Bruford, Squire, Wakeman | 11:17 |
| 4. | "Long Distance Runaround" | Anderson | 3:46 |
| 5. | "The Fish" | Squire | 8:53 |
| 6. | "Awaken" | Anderson, Howe | 19:20 |
| 7. | "I've Seen All Good People" | Anderson, Squire | 7:10 |
| 8. | "Roundabout" | Anderson, Howe | 6:44 |

== Personnel ==
- Jon Anderson – lead vocals, MIDI guitar, harp, acoustic guitar, percussion
- Chris Squire – bass guitar, harmonica, backing vocals
- Steve Howe – acoustic guitar, electric guitar, pedal steel guitar, mandolin, backing vocals
- Rick Wakeman – keyboards, Minimoog
- Alan White – drums, percussion
