= Pitiful =

Pitiful may refer to:

- "Pitiful" (Sick Puppies song)
- Pitiful (Blindside song)
- "Pitiful", a song by Aretha Franklin from the album Soul '69

== See also ==
- "Mr. Pitiful", a song by Otis Redding
- "Poor Poor Pitiful Me", a song by Warren Zevon
- "You're Pitiful", a song by "Weird Al" Yankovic
