= David Strother =

American musician and composer

- Origin: Los Angeles, U.S.
- Genres: Experimental music
- Occupations: Musician, Composer
- Instrument: violin
- Label: Remba Records
- Website: http://myspace.com/davidstrother

David Strother is an American musician and composer. Strother is based in Los Angeles and plays alternative violin. He has been featured in recordings, on stage and in film since the 1980s. Strother has played for numerous local Los Angeles bands, including Lawrence Lebo, Long John Oliva, and The Radio Ranch Straight Shooters. He ranges in style from jazz, blues and swing to avant garde/alternative, but proclaims his passion lies in alternative, both in performance and composition.

== Life and career ==
Strother attended both Cal State Los Angeles, where he earned a B.A. in classical composition, and Los Angeles City College.

Strother has been featured on movie and television soundtracks including for David Lynch in “The Straight Story,” “Philadelphia Experiment II,” “Doug”, and “The Rookie."

Strother still occasionally appears with The Radio Ranch Straight Shooters, who were important members of the LA Roots/Rockabilly/Punk scene. RRSS played on the same stage with The Blasters, X, and Big Sandy & His Fly-Rite Boys. Strother played alongside DJ Bonebrake, Bill Bateman (drummer, The Blasters), Chas Smith, Smokey Hormel, Hank Van Sickle, Denny Croy (former Moon Martin bassist) and Nick Kane (guitarist for The Mavericks). He has also played for Rebekah Del Rio and currently appears with Davie Gayle's country/roots band. He also co-hosts, along with the Los Angeles poet Ricardo Acuna, the monthly Poetry & Wine Salon at the Majestical Roof Gallery in the Old Town District of Pasadena, California.

In 2006, Strother released his first solo CD entitled “the desert is singing” with Remba Records, which features solo electric violin and original composition by Strother. A 2010 track review by C. Michael Bailey of allaboutjazz.com praised Strother's unaccompanied version of "Blue Monk," writing, "Strother's dissolution is delicious, departing so far from the blues that John Coltrane could probably see him coming. Flights of whimsy and demonic psychic breaks characterize this far-reaching playing." The CD has also been described on Amazon as “meditative” and “soulfully deep.” A new EP work by Strother, "soundings.live," was released in July 2011 and features his playing on the five string electric violin, which he began using exclusively in 2009. He also became an official artist for NS Design in 2011.

== Discography ==
- 1990: CPD – “The Process"
- 1995: Alternate Faith-“Out of Nowhere"
- 2004: Susan J. Paul-“Big Love"
- 2004: Lawrence Lebo-"Don't Call Her Larry, vol. 2"
- 2005: Davie Gayle-“Amber in the Clay"
- 2005: Sonny Salsbury-"How's About a Boa?"
- 2006: David Strother-“the desert is singing"
- 2010: Tito Calloway-"Thugelligence"
- 2010: Lawrence Lebo-"Don't Call Her Larry, vol. 3"
- 2010: Scot Ray-"Earth Circuit"
- 2011: David Strother-"soundings.live"
- 2012: Lawrence Lebo-"The Best of Don't Call Her Larry-Blues Mix"
- 2013: David Strother-"muse"

== Motion picture and television soundtracks ==
- 1992: Doug (Nickelodeon TV series)
- 1993: Philadelphia Experiment II (with an onscreen appearance)
- 1997: Alien Avengers 2 (with an onscreen appearance)
- 1999: The Straight Story
- 2002: The Rookie

== Bands ==
- 1988-92: CPD (experimental/avant garde)
- 1989–present: Lawrence Lebo (swing/blues)
- 1992: King Ernest (blues)
- 1988-90: Long John Oliva (Afro-Cuban)
- 1988-92: L.A. Despers (calypso)
- 1992–present: The Radio Ranch Straight Shooters (western swing)
- 2001-03: Mobile Homeboys (swing/jazz/blues)
- 2005–present: Davie Gayle (country/roots)
