= Live My Last =

American rock band

- Origin: Columbus, Ohio, US
- Genres: Rock; alternative; pop; heavy metal
- Years active: 2006–present
- Label: Fidelity Entertainment Group
- Members: Brock Richards; Brandon Friedel; Mark Fox
- Past members: Justin Wilson; Codee Carle; Jon Grubbs; Jason Rau; Jesse Cepeda

Live My Last is an American rock band from Columbus, Ohio formed in 2006. The group consists of vocalist Justin Wilson, guitarists Brock Richards and Brandon Friedel, and drummer Mark Fox. They have released three extended plays and one studio album and are currently working on their sophomore record.

== History ==
=== Formation (2006–2008) ===
Live My Last formed in 2006 with completely different members than who are in the band now. They began playing throughout the state of Ohio, promoting CD demos. In 2007, their first single titled "Out of Light" was released.

=== Rescues EP (2009–2010) ===
In 2010, current member Brock Richards joined the band and they released their first EP titled Rescues. The extended play consisted on three tracks.

=== Line-up change and reformation (2011) ===
From the year before to 2011, the band's line-up changed: Justin Wilson eventually replaced their former lead singer when he met Mark Fox (who replaced their former drummer) and Richards (other members were replaced as well); the band also had bass player Codee Carle. At the beginning of the year, the band covered Christina Aguilera's 'Genie In a Bottle,' which an official studio version of the cover can be found online.

During this time, Brandon Friedel joined Live My Last as the second guitarist and the band eventually became a four-piece, which prompted them to change their formation year to 2011 as they viewed the line-up had been "solidified." Then they released their second extended play titled, 45's Are Still In Fashion, a lyric taken from one of the two tracks available on the release.

=== Convictions (2012) ===
On February 11, 2012, Live My Last released their third extended play titled Ep. This release had five tracks, including the two from their second extended play.

In May 2012, the band began recording their first studio album at Spider Studios with producer Ben Schigel (Drowning Pool, Breaking Benjamin, Chimaira, Machine Gun Kelly). The band created a Kickstarter to fund the production of the album and reached their goal in September. Their full-length, debut studio album Convictions was released on December 20, 2012, and became available on iTunes the day after Christmas.

=== Hiatus, second studio album and Justin Wilson's death (2013–present) ===
In early 2013, the band uploaded to YouTube music videos for a few tracks from 'Convictions,' including a music video for their single 'Let's Get This Started Again.'

Before the summer, Wilson left Live My Last temporarily and Jon Grubbs of Ranger Danger replaced his role as lead singer in live performances. During this year, the band opened for The Used. When Wilson returned, Friedel also left the band and Carle came back for live performances before Friedel returned later on.

On February 2, 2016, Friedel tweeted through the band's Twitter account that the "writing for the next album has begun," with a photo of him playing guitar in the studio. Since then, the band has been posting updates on social media of the recording of their sophomore record. In July 2016, the band apologized for being so inactive as they have had to deal with "personal issues" but "are ready to get back onto the stage."

On July 1, 2018, The band tweeted through their Twitter account that Wilson had died.

== Musical influences ==
Live My Last has cited that some of their musical influences range from The Used, Incubus, Blindside, Jimmy Eat World, 36 Crazyfists, Bless The Fall, A Day To Remember, Sevendust, and Story Of The Year.

== Band members ==
Current

- Brock Richards – guitar, backup vocals (2010–present)
- Brandon Friedel – guitar, backup vocals (2012–present)
- Mark Fox – drums, percussion (2011–present)

Past

- Codee Carle – bass (2010-2011) (2013)
- Jason Rau – bass (2012)
- Jon Grubbs – lead vocals (2013)
- Justin Wilson – lead vocals (2011–2013, 2014-2018; died 2018)
- Jesse Cepeda - Founding Member, lead vocals (2006-2011)

== Discography ==
Albums

- Convictions (2012)

EPs

- Rescues EP (2010)
- 45's Are Still In Fashion (2011)
- Ep - EP (2012)

Singles

- "Out of Light" (2007)
- "Let's Get This Started Again" (2012)
