= Essentially Yes =

Box set by Yes
- Released: 14 November 2006
- Recorded: 1992–2003
- Genre: Progressive rock
- Length: 3:23:05
- Label: Eagle Records
- Producers: Yes, Trevor Rabin, Bruce Fairbairn, Tim Weidner

Yes chronology
The Word Is Live (2005)	Essentially Yes (2006)	Live at Montreux 2003 (2007)

Professional ratings
Review scores
Source	Rating
AllMusic	3/5 stars

Essentially Yes is a boxed set by progressive rock band Yes. It was released in 2006 by Eagle Records. It contains five discs, four of which are previously released studio albums; Talk, Open Your Eyes, The Ladder, and Magnification. The fifth disc is a single CD version of what was later released as the 2-CD live album Live at Montreux 2003.

== Track listing ==
- Disc 1: Open Your Eyes
- Disc 2: The Ladder (includes Homeworld preview)
- Disc 3: Magnification
- Disc 4: Talk (includes 2002 bonus track)
- Disc 5: Live at Montreux 2003 (single-disc version)

== Personnel ==
- Jon Anderson: Vocals on all discs.
- Chris Squire: Bass on all discs.
- Steve Howe: Guitar on discs 1, 2, 3, and 5.
- Trevor Rabin: Guitar, backing vocals, keyboards, and string arrangements on disc 4.
- Tony Kaye: Hammond organ on disc 4.
- Rick Wakeman: Keyboards on disc 5.
- Igor Khoroshev: Keyboards on discs 1 (on tracks 1, 4 and 5) and 2.
- Billy Sherwood: Guitar and keyboards on discs 1 and 2.
- Alan White: Drums on all discs.

with

- Steve Porcaro: Keyboards on disc 1 track 2.
- Larry Groupé: Orchestra conductor on disc 3.
