= The Ladder (album) =

Studio album by Yes
- Released: 20 September 1999
- Recorded: February–May 1999
- Studios: Armoury, Kitsilano, Vancouver
- Genres: Progressive rock; pop rock
- Length: 60:26
- Label: Eagle
- Producer: Bruce Fairbairn

Yes chronology
Open Your Eyes (1997)	The Ladder (1999)	House of Yes: Live from House of Blues (2000)

The Ladder is the eighteenth studio album by the English progressive rock band Yes, released in September 1999 on Eagle Records. It is their only studio album recorded with six full time members and their last with keyboardist Igor Khoroshev.

The band met with Canadian producer Bruce Fairbairn in 1998 while touring their previous album Open Your Eyes (1997), who agreed to produce their next studio album at Armoury Studios in Vancouver. They spent four months producing a demo tape of new songs, which saw the group work collectively on the music for the first time in a while. The album features a variety of world instruments performed by Randy Raine-Reusch. Fairbairn died from a sudden heart attack during the final recording and mixing sessions, after which Yes dedicated The Ladder to him.

The Ladder received a warm reception from critics who saw the album as a return to creative form. It reached a peak of No. 36 on the UK Albums Chart and No. 99 on the US Billboard 200. Three singles were released: "Homeworld (The Ladder)", "Lightning Strikes", and "If Only You Knew"; the first was used in the 1999 real-time strategy PC game Homeworld. After touring the album worldwide in 1999 and 2000, Sherwood left the band.

== Background ==
In October 1998, the Yes line-up of vocalist Jon Anderson, bassist Chris Squire, guitarist Steve Howe, drummer Alan White, guitarist Billy Sherwood, and keyboardist Igor Khoroshev (brought in as a side musician for the tour), wrapped their 12-month world tour in support of their seventeenth studio album, Open Your Eyes (1997). For their next move the group felt the time was right to record a new studio album. In November 1998, Squire confirmed to the press that they agreed to work with Canadian producer and musician Bruce Fairbairn, who was recommended by their management The Left Bank Organization as they had worked with him on other projects. The band had produced Open Your Eyes themselves, but wished for an outside producer to give the music objective ears and aid in its direction. During their stop in Vancouver, British Columbia, Canada during the Open Your Eyes tour in mid-1998, they visited Fairbairn; Howe said: "We all took to him amazingly well. We prayed that he would say 'yes' to the idea of working with us". Fairbairn, a fan of the band and aware of their musical talents and capabilities, agreed to work with them.

Howe recalled in his memoirs that the experience went as well as expected. Fairbairn both nurtured and challenged the band, giving individual members his full attention when they were overdubbing parts and providing direction to them as a group. At the same time he was an unforgiving critic of Anderson's lyrics, sometimes striking them out and telling the singer to come back the next day with new ones. "He was simply marvellous to work with", Howe wrote. "He knew exactly how to make records but had to remind us how to."

Later in November 1998, Yes returned to Vancouver to write, rehearse, and prepare demos of their new material in Sanctuary Studios, which lasted until February 1999. As they had performed the final gigs of the Open Your Eyes tour in Japan, they organised to have their equipment shipped to Vancouver to perform. By this time, Khoroshev became a full-time member. The Ladder saw Yes write an album collectively for the first time in a while; one of the conditions they agreed upon was that if a member contributed a song of his own, the band would not use it. Sections of songs were then brought in and combined with another, particularly if they were not complete to allow them to be worked on further. Fairbairn attended the rehearsals for two weeks, something that Howe had never seen before as previous producers he had worked with could never be bothered. Having produced a demo of some songs, Fairbairn picked eight of the strongest tracks for the band to work on.

== Recording ==
The Ladder was recorded from February–May 1999 at Armoury Studios in Kitsilano, a western neighbourhood of Vancouver. Fairbairn is credited as the producer and Mike Plotnikoff the engineer and mixer. The album's title was inspired by the Indica Gallery in London that housed an art exhibition in 1966 where John Lennon first met Yoko Ono, who had constructed her Ceiling Painting (or the Yes Painting) which required people to climb a ladder and look through a magnifying glass suspended from the ceiling, which allowed them to see the word "YES" in tiny letters on a framed piece of paper on the ceiling. During the recording, the band lived in different apartments within the same building and travelled to and from the studio together. White recalled that the band had not done such a thing since they recorded Going for the One (1977) in Switzerland and felt such a situation benefited the album's progression.

Fairbairn wished to capture a "live" feel for the album with minimal use of overdubbing. He gave Howe the nickname "Swami" for his tendency to bring elements of spirituality into the music. With two guitarists in the band at the time of recording, Howe played the lead guitars and Sherwood much of the rhythm parts and "a few of the breaks". Like Open Your Eyes, Khoroshev plays a Hammond B-3 organ but had to use an organ simulator as the sound of the real model sometimes bled into White's drum tracks. The simulator was fed through a Leslie speaker cabinet to obtain a more authentic sound. He intended to play a greater variety of keyboard instruments such as the harmonium and accordion, but did not get to use them. Fairbairn wanted Squire to play his Rickenbacker bass for the entire album, but the bassist would suggest playing parts on different models, which Fairbairn ended up liking the sound of better and kept them in the final takes. Squire played his Rickenbacker, his signature Chris Squire Mouradian, an 8-string Ranney, a Fender Jazz bass on "Face to Face", a Tobias with B-E-A-D tuning on "New Language", and an Electra Outlaw MPC bass with a flanger effect. Select tambourine and shaker parts were completed by Sherwood as White was absent from the studio due to a minor illness. There were certain tracks where Sherwood nailed the overdub in one take.

The album also features contributions from multi-instrumentalist Randy Raine-Reusch, who, along with Anderson, contributed much of the ethnic instrumentation present throughout the album. After returning from a conference in Cairo, Egypt, Raine-Reusch was asked to meet with White and Anderson and selected some world instruments to flesh out certain songs. The instruments were then transported by Raine-Reusch to the band's recording studio. Raine-Reusch ended up playing a zheng on "To Be Alive", a didgeridoo on "Can I", a tamboura on "Nine Voices", and a finger cymbal known as a Ching, as well as other effects such as a bullroarer throughout the album.

On 17 May 1999, during the final recording and mixing sessions, Fairbairn died unexpectedly of a heart attack at age 49. Known for his punctuality, concerns were raised when he failed to turn up to the studio on time. After two-and-a-half hours without an answer, Anderson and studio receptionist and manager Sheryl Preston drove to Fairbairn's apartment, broke in after they found an untouched tape on his doorstep, and discovered his body in his bed. His passing was a shock to everyone involved and ended tentative discussions to work with the band again on future projects. After Yes took a short break, they regrouped and completed the production and mixing duties with Plotnikoff. The Ladder was then mastered at Sterling Sound Studios in New York City in May 1999. At Fairbairn's funeral service held on 24 May, Anderson and Howe performed an acoustic version of "Nine Voices (Longwalker)", a song that Anderson recalled touched Fairbairn personally and was a favourite of his. Yes subsequently dedicated The Ladder to Fairbairn.

== Songs ==
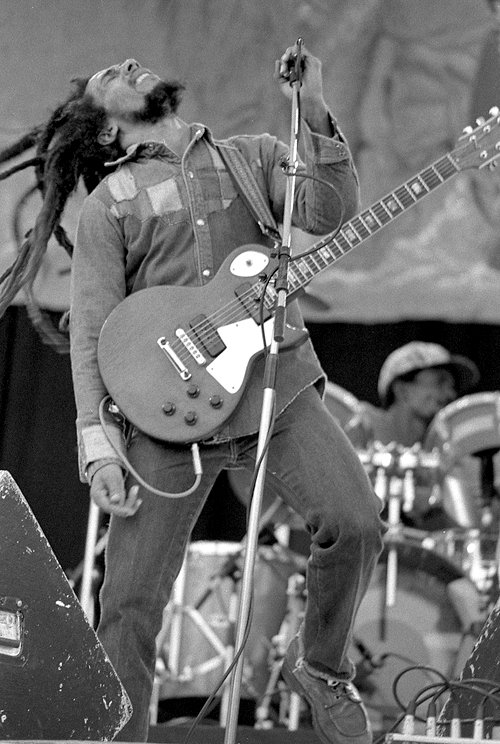
"The Messenger" was written about Jamaican singer-songwriter Bob Marley.

"Homeworld (The Ladder)", originally titled "Climbing the Ladder", is the result of the band's discussions with video game developer Relic Entertainment and publisher Sierra Games, who expressed an interest for Yes to license a track for their 1999 real-time strategy PC game Homeworld. The group agreed to have the track featured in the game's ending credits, which features Anderson writing lyrics inspired by its themes of science-fiction, space, and the search for a new home. According to Anderson, the track was close to being taken off the album as the band had written a collection of arrangements but struggled to fit them together prior to working on them to fit into a song. "It Will Be a Good Day (The River)" features Howe playing a Japanese koto.

The opening to "Lightning Strikes" features the same Mellotron flute sample as "Phenomenal Cat" by The Kinks. White had been experimenting with more unusual jazz and African-inspired rhythms when playing in his studio and played them to Anderson, who then adapted some his chords and a melody he had written to fit it. Squire was especially pleased with the song and how it pushed the band into new musical directions. "Face to Face" includes a 7/4 time signature. "Can I?" quotes Anderson's solo track "We Have Heaven" from Fragile (1971). Howe said it sounds as if Anderson invented a new language for it and recorded the phrase "Ooh wop" as part of the backing vocals. "If Only You Knew" is a love song that Anderson wrote for his wife Jane, which he had originally titled "She Caught Me When I Was Falling". During the writing phase, Fairbairn suggested that the band record a track about someone, which made Anderson think about Bob Marley, one of his favourite musicians. "Just when we finished that track I walked out of the studio and MTV were showing a classic Bob Marley concert. So I thought, 'Gosh, that's a sign!'" "New Language" includes a church organ solo performed on Yamaha keyboards. It also features a bass line from "Roundabout" in it.

"Nine Voices (Longwalker)" features Howe playing a laúd which he also played on past Yes songs "I've Seen All Good People" and "Wonderous Stories". The track came about following the completion of "New Language" when Fairbairn asked what song they wished to record next, and suggested one about a real event. This led Anderson and Howe to produce a demo of "Nine Voices (Longwalker)" that they saw as an ideal closing track. The song is based on The Longest Walk, a spiritual-led walk across the United States in 1978 organised by the American Indian Movement to support tribal sovereignty. Anderson had befriended one of the participants, named Longwalker, and wrote the song about nine tribe members and the song they sing to "bring forgiveness into the world". Anderson has given a different explanation to the song's meaning, in which it concerned nine tribesmen in Africa who sing at the time of the Harmonic Convergence, a global meditation event that occurred in 1987 that he had previously sung about on Big Generator (1987).

== Artwork ==
The Ladder features artwork by the band's longtime sleeve designer, artist Roger Dean.

== Release and reception ==
Professional ratings
Review scores
Source	Rating
AllMusic	3/5 stars
The Daily Vault	C+
Encyclopedia of Popular Music	4/5 stars
Progressiveworld	(favorable)
The Rolling Stone Album Guide	2/5 stars

The Ladder was released on vinyl and CD in September 1999 by Eagle Records in the UK and by Beyond Music in the US. It was a greater commercial success than Open Your Eyes in both countries after the latter had failed to enter the UK Albums Chart. For its one-week presence on the UK chart, the album reached No. 36 for the week of 2 October 1999. In the US, the album peaked at No. 99 on the Billboard 200 chart during its two-week stay in the same month. The album included a digital preview of the game Homeworld which was also included when The Ladder was reissued for the Yes album compilation box set, Essentially Yes (2006).

In October 1999, Jason Warburg reviewed the album in for The Daily Vault, giving it a "C+" rating. He recognised the band were looking back at its 1970s output yet looking forward to create a "new definition of 'The Yes Sound'" which he welcomed, particularly with "Homeworld (The Ladder)", an example of how the group "can unquestionably still tackle the sprawling, multi-themed rock numbers that were once its bread and butter". However, Warburg thought Yes continues to struggle to "define itself" yet blended its progressive 1970s and pop-oriented 1980s sound better on The Ladder than Open Your Eyes, and Anderson's "New Age blather" and "airy optimism" in his lyrics hurts the music at times. In the following month Gene Stout, for the Seattle Post-Intelligencer, wrote The Ladder "is a bright, optimistic album" with an unusual combination of orchestral rock and reggae textures and styles. In the Daily Herald in the Chicago area printed a positive review by Rick Baert. He gave the album four stars out of five, and also welcomed the band's return to elements of their musical roots which he said were missing from Talk (1994) and Open Your Eyes, noting the opening track as "traditional Yes". "It Will Be a Good Day" reminded Baert of "The Revealing Science of God" from Tales from Topographic Oceans (1973) and "The Messenger" of Fragile, and noted "If Only You Knew" as a rare "believable love song" by the band that comes off as authentic.

In a retrospective review for AllMusic, Bret Adams gave the album three stars out of five. He praised Fairbairn's choice of not overproducing the album which he felt Fairbairn had done on previous albums by Kiss and Aerosmith. Anderson, Howe, and Squire, Adams thought, had "fine moments" and noted White's drumming "consistent". He thought "Homeworld (The Ladder)" was a "tight performance" and noted the "supple vocals/acoustic guitar/piano coda" as its strongest section, but rated "Face to Face" as the album's strongest track and "New Language" the album's best long form song. Longtime supporter of the band and biographer Chris Welch praised Fairbairn's "sensitive, disciplined" production and Plotnikoff's engineering gave a "cohesion, clarity, structure and a strong live feel to the album". He thought each song had its own unique identity yet "seemed linked to a common cause", and pointed out that the band's sparing use of instrumental power enhanced the music. Welch highlighted "Face to Face", a track he felt "had some of the most joyful playing heard on a Yes album in many moons".

== Tour and aftermath ==
A four-month tour of the Americas to support the album began in Rio de Janeiro on 6 September, two weeks before its release, followed by a two-month tour of Europe in 2000 that ended on 25 March in Bucharest, after which Billy Sherwood left the band.

== Track listing ==
All music by Jon Anderson, Steve Howe, Billy Sherwood, Chris Squire, Alan White and Igor Khoroshev, except where noted. All lyrics by Anderson.

No.	Title	Length
1.	"Homeworld (The Ladder)"	9:32
2.	"It Will Be a Good Day (The River)"	4:53
3.	"Lightning Strikes"	4:35
4.	"Can I?"	1:31
5.	"Face to Face"	5:02
6.	"If Only You Knew"	5:42
7.	"To Be Alive (Hep Yadda)"	5:07
8.	"Finally"	6:01
9.	"The Messenger"	5:12
10.	"New Language"	9:19
11.	"Nine Voices (Longwalker)"	3:27

1999 Japanese release
No.	Title	Writer(s)	Length
12.	"I've Seen All Good People" (Live in Los Angeles 1997)	Anderson, Squire	10:22
13.	"And You and I" (Live in Los Angeles 1997)	Anderson; themes by Bill Bruford, Howe, Squire	11:32
Total length:			1:22:20 (82:20)

2000 Limited Tour Edition
No.	Title	Writer(s)	Length
12.	"Homeworld (Live)"		9:27
13.	"The Messenger"		6:37
14.	"All Good People"	Anderson, Squire	3:33
Total length:			1:20:03 (80:03)

== Personnel ==
Credits are adapted from the album's liner notes.

Yes

- Jon Anderson – lead vocals
- Steve Howe – lead and acoustic guitars, pedal steel guitars, mandolin, vocals
- Billy Sherwood – guitars, vocals
- Chris Squire – bass guitar, vocals
- Igor Khoroshev – keyboards, vocals
- Alan White – drums, percussion, vocals

Additional musicians

- Randy Raine-Reusch – tanbur, guzheng, ching cymbals, bullroarer, didjeridoo, percussion
- Rhys Fulber – dance loops
- The Marguerita Horns – horns on "Lightning Strikes"
  - Tom Keenlyside – piccolo, tenor saxophone
  - Derry Burns – trumpet
  - Rod Murray – trombone
  - Tom Colclough – alto saxophone
  - Neil Nicholson – tuba

Production

- Bruce Fairbairn – producer
- Mike Plotnikoff – engineer, mixing
- Paul Silveira – assistant engineer
- Steeve Hennessy – guitars and keyboards technical support
- Drew Arnott – keyboard technical support
- Chin Injeti – keyboard technical support
- Chris Crippen – drums technical support
- George Marino – mastering (at Sterling Sound Studios, New York, June 1999)
- Roger Dean – painting, logo and lettering
- Martyn Dean – design

== Charts ==
Chart (1999)	Peak position
Dutch Albums (Album Top 100)	70
German Albums (Offizielle Top 100)	38
Italian Albums (Musica e Dischi)	39
Japanese Albums (Oricon)	38
Scottish Albums (Official Charts)	48
UK Albums (Official Charts)	36
US Billboard 200	99
