= Silence (Blindside album) =

Studio album by Blindside
- Released: August 20, 2002
- Recorded: 2002
- Studio: Bay 7 Studios, Valley Village, California and Dark Studio, Calabasas, California
- Genre: Post-hardcore; alternative metal; alternative rock; Christian rock
- Length: 47:24
- Label: Elektra
- Producer: Howard Benson

Blindside chronology
A Thought Crushed My Mind (2000)	Silence (2002)	About a Burning Fire (2004)

Singles from Silence
- 1. "Pitiful" Released: 2002; 2. "Sleepwalking" Released: January 20, 2003

Professional ratings
Review scores
Source	Rating
Allmusic	3/5 stars
Jesus Freak Hideout	4.5/5 stars

Silence is the third studio album by Swedish rock band Blindside. Produced by Howard Benson, it was released on August 20, 2002, through Elektra Records, as the band's major label debut.

== Singles ==
Silence was Blindside's major breakthrough. It generated the hit single "Pitiful" and the follow-up singles "Sleepwalking" and "Caught a Glimpse."

== Track listing ==
All music is composed by Christian Lindskog, Simon Grenehed, Tomas Näslund, Marcus Dahlström.

No.	Title	Length
1.	"Caught a Glimpse"	3:25
2.	"Pitiful"	3:14
3.	"Sleepwalking"	4:03
4.	"Cute Boring Love"	3:36
5.	"The Endings"	3:44
6.	"You Can Hide It"	3:11
7.	"Thought Like Flames"	3:54
8.	"Time Will Change Your Heart"	2:58
9.	"Painting"	3:36
10.	"Midnight"	4:12
11.	"Coming Back to Life"	2:49
12.	"She Shut Your Eyes"	2:59
13.	"Silence"	5:37
Total length:		47:24

== Personnel ==
Blindside

- Christian Lindskog – lead vocals
- Simon Grenehed – guitars, backing vocals
- Tomas Näslund – bass guitar
- Marcus Dahlström – drums

Artwork

- Blindside, David Greenhill, Lili Picou – art direction
- Johann Perjus – design
- James Minchin III – photography
- DeAnna Klemmer – groomer
- Brandy St. John – stylist

Additional musician

- Howard Benson, Jamie Muhoberac – keyboards

Production

- Howard Benson – producer
- Andres Torres – assistant producer
- Josh Deutsch – A&R
- Ted Jensen – mastering
- Chris Lord-Alge – mixing
- Eric Miller– additional mixing on "Silence"
- Mike Plotnikoff – engineer, digital editing
- Eric Miller – additional engineer
- Gersh – drum technician
- Steve Russel – guitar technician, additional engineer
- Dan Koshelnyk, Jason Lader, John O – digital editing

== Charts ==
Chart (2002)	Peak position
US Billboard 200	83
