= About a Burning Fire =

Studio album by Blindside
- Released: February 24, 2004
- Recorded: 2003 at Bay 7 Studios (Valley Village, CA); Sparky Dark Studios (Calabasas, CA)
- Genres: Post-hardcore; alternative metal; alternative rock; Christian rock
- Length: 44:38
- Labels: Elektra; 3 Points
- Producer: Howard Benson

Blindside chronology
Silence (2002)	About a Burning Fire (2004)	The Great Depression (2005)

Professional ratings
Review scores
Source	Rating
Allmusic	2.5/5 stars
Jesus Freak Hideout	4/5 stars

About a Burning Fire is the fourth studio album by Swedish rock band Blindside. It was released on February 24, 2004, through Elektra and 3 Points Records. The album charted at 39 on the Billboard top 200 which was even higher than their previous album, Silence which charted at 89 for 9 weeks straight. The album is also notable for featuring The Smashing Pumpkins' Billy Corgan on the track "Hooray, It's L.A." as well as being featured on the soundtrack for the video game Need For Speed Underground.

"All of Us" became the album's lead single. Its music video features a young man chasing after a woman through a dead, leafless forest. In his desperation, the man's arms begin to stretch out to her in a feat similar to Mr. Fantastic's. The video aired considerably on Fuse TV.

== Track listing ==
1. "Eye of the Storm" – 4:02
2. "Follow You Down" – 3:01
3. "All of Us" – 3:31
4. "Shekina" – 4:46
5. "Hooray, It's L.A." – 3:17 (featuring Billy Corgan of The Smashing Pumpkins)
6. "Swallow" – 2:25
7. "Die Buying" – 3:18
8. "Across Waters Again" – 4:13
9. "After You're Gone" – 2:57
10. "Where the Sun Never Dies" – 4:18
11. "Roads" – 4:14
12. "About a Burning Fire" – 4:36

B-Sides: "I Know Why You Dress in Black" – 2:29

== Band ==
- Marcus Dahlström – drummer
- Simon Grenehed – guitarist, vocalist
- Christian Lindskog – vocalist
- Tomas Näslund – bassist, pianist, vocalist

== Credits ==
- All songs written by Blindside
- Published by Walking Home Music (ASCAP)
- Produced by Howard Benson
- Mixed by Chris Lord-Alge
- Recorded by Mike Plotnikoff
- Additional engineering by Eric Miller
- Digital editing: Paul DeCarli, Mike Plotnikoff and Eric Miller
- Additional recording by Lasse Marten at Decibel Stockholm Studios
- Pre-production at Valley Center Studios
- Mastered by Tom Baker at Precision Mastering (Hollywood, CA)
- Drum tech: John Nicholson at Drum Fetish
- Billy Corgan: guitar on "Hooray, It's L.A."
- Emma Härdelin: vocals on "Shekina"
- Jon Rekdal: trumpet solo on "Roads"
- Jen Kuhn: cello on "Shekina" and "Roads"
- Neel Hammond: violin on "Shekina" and "Roads"
- Petter Winnberg: double bass on "Shekina"
- Howard Benson: vox continental organ on "Swallow"
- Billy Corgan appears courtesy of Reprise Records
- Management: Tim M. Cook, Tim Ottley and Rachel Koeneke for Cook Management, LLC.
- A&R: Howard Benson
- Production coordinator: Dana Childs
- Business management: Mark Kaplan for Kaplan Corp.
- Legal: Doug Mark, Esquire for Barnes, Morris, Klein, Mark and Yorn
- Booking: Michael Arlin at Artist Group International
- International booking: Emma Banks at Helter Skelter
- Tour management and live sound by Danny Hill
- Art direction: Asterik Studio and blindside with Lili Picou
- Design: Asterik Studio, Seattle
- Photography: Kris McCaddon
- Band photography: Daniel Mansson
- Album coordinator: Danielle Bond
