= We Can Fly =

2011 song performed by Yes

Single by Yes

from the album Fly from Here
- Released: 13 June 2011
- Recorded: 2011
- Length: 4:15
- Label: Frontiers Records
- Songwriters: Trevor Horn, Geoff Downes, Chris Squire
- Producer: Trevor Horn

Yes singles chronology
"If Only You Knew" (2000)	"We Can Fly" (2011)	"The Ice Bridge" (2021)

"We Can Fly" is a single by the progressive rock band Yes, recorded and released in 2011, through Frontiers Records, and consisting of shortened versions of two sections of the suite "Fly from Here" from their album of the same name (2011): "Fly from Here, Part I: We Can Fly" and "Fly from Here, Part V: We Can Fly (Reprise)".

It is the first single by Yes since "If Only You Knew" (from their eighteenth studio album, The Ladder), released in 1999. It is also the only Yes single with Benoît David on vocals, and the second after "Into the Lens" in 1980 without Jon Anderson on vocals and with Geoff Downes on keyboards. It was written by members Trevor Horn, Geoff Downes, and Chris Squire, the latter handling production.

== Music video ==
The official music video was released on 3 July 2011. The video portrays the story of an airline passenger awaiting his flight, who reads a magazine article about a 1940s Hollywood mogul who died in a plane crash as a result of a "pilot error." The man finishes reading, runs down a flight of stairs, and boards his plane only to find the same '40s-era cast of characters aboard, with a stewardess leading him to the cockpit to pilot the plane. Trevor Horn makes a cameo appearance as the movie mogul.

== Jon Anderson's reaction ==
In an interview with Rolling Stone, Anderson stated that on hearing "We Can Fly" he felt it sounded "a bit dated" and that Trevor Horn's production "wasn't as good as I expected". He did, however, praise David's vocal performance.

== Personnel ==
=== Yes ===
- Benoît David – lead vocals
- Chris Squire – bass, backing vocals
- Steve Howe – guitars, backing vocals
- Geoff Downes – keyboards
- Alan White – drums

=== Additional musicians ===
- Oliver Wakeman – additional keyboards

== Release history ==
Country	Date	Format (Version)	Label
Australia	13 June 2011	Digital download – radio edit	Frontiers Records
Austria	13 June 2011	Digital download – radio edit	Frontiers Records
Belgium	13 June 2011	Digital download – radio edit	Frontiers Records
Canada	13 June 2011	Digital download – radio edit	Frontiers Records
Finland	13 June 2011	Digital download – radio edit	Frontiers Records
France	13 June 2011	Digital download – radio edit	Frontiers Records
Germany	13 June 2011	Digital download – radio edit	Frontiers Records
Ireland	13 June 2011	Digital download – radio edit	Frontiers Records
Italy	13 June 2011	Digital download – radio edit	Frontiers Records
Japan	13 June 2011	Digital download – radio edit	Frontiers Records
Luxembourg	13 June 2011	Digital download – radio edit	Frontiers Records
Netherlands	13 June 2011	Digital download – radio edit	Frontiers Records
New Zealand	13 June 2011	Digital download – radio edit	Frontiers Records
Norway	13 June 2011	Digital download – radio edit	Frontiers Records
Portugal	13 June 2011	Digital download – radio edit	Frontiers Records
Singapore	13 June 2011	Digital download – radio edit	Frontiers Records
Spain	13 June 2011	Digital download – radio edit	Frontiers Records
Sweden	13 June 2011	Digital download – radio edit	Frontiers Records
Switzerland	13 June 2011	Digital download – radio edit	Frontiers Records
United Kingdom	13 June 2011	Digital download – radio edit	Frontiers Records
United States	13 June 2011	Digital download – radio edit	Frontiers Records
