= A Thought Crushed My Mind =

Studio album by Blindside
- Released: January 25, 2000
- Genres: Nu metal; alternative metal; post-hardcore
- Length: 58:02
- Label: Solid State
- Producer: Andre Jacobsson

Blindside chronology
Blindside (1997)	A Thought Crushed My Mind (2000)	Silence (2002)

Professional ratings
Review scores
Source	Rating
AllMusic	3/5 stars
Jesus Freak Hideout	4/5 stars
Kerrang!	4/5 stars
HM Magazine	mixed

A Thought Crushed My Mind is the second studio album by Swedish rock band Blindside produced by Tooth & Nail Records. Originally released under Solid State Records, the album was re-released on May 10, 2005, by DRT with the addition of 5 bonus tracks. The album artwork was also expanded, including song lyrics previously omitted.

== Track listing ==
1. "Vow of Silence" – 3:48
2. "As You Walk" – 4:07
3. "King of the Closet" – 4:04
4. "My Mother's Only Son" – 5:43
5. "Act" – 3:47
6. "SilverSpeak" – 3:26
7. "Where Eye Meets Eye" – 3:46
8. "Nära" – 4:47
9. "In the Air of Truth" – 3:01
10. "Across Waters" – 4:28
11. "Nothing But Skin" – 9:18

=== Bonus tracks ===
12. "Knocking on Another Door" – 1:48
13. "Sunrise" – 3:20
14. "From Stone to Backbone" – 4:21
15. "All You Need Is..." – 2:08
16. "[phatbeat 1303]" – 4:07

== Personnel ==
- Christian Lindskog – lead vocals
- Simon Grenehed – guitars
- Tomas Näslund – bass guitar
- Marcus Dahlström – drums
