= Yesspeak Live: The Director's Cut =

Video by Yes
- Released: 2004
- Language: English

Yes chronology
Classic Artists: Yes (2007)	Yesspeak Live: The Director's Cut (2008)	The Lost Broadcasts (2009)

Yesspeak Live: The Director's Cut is a two-disc DVD concert film from the progressive rock band Yes. It was recorded live on their 2003 European tour. The set features two concerts recorded in Birmingham, England, and the Glastonbury Festival, respectively. The concerts also feature interviews with band members and commentary. Excerpts of these concerts were used throughout the 2004 documentary Yesspeak.

== Track listing ==
=== Disc one ===
- "Siberian Khatru"
- "Magnification"
- "Don't Kill the Whale"
- "In the Presence Of"
- "We Have Heaven"
- "South Side of the Sky"
- "And You and I"
- "To Be Over"
- "Clap"
- "Show Me"
- "Catherine of Aragon/Celtic Jig/Jane Seymour"
- "Heart of the Sunrise"
- "Long Distance Runaround"
- "The Fish (Schindleria Praematurus)"

=== Disc two ===
- "Awaken"
- "I’ve Seen All Good People"
- "Roundabout"

Glastonbury Festival

- "Siberian Khatru"
- "Magnification"
- "Don’t Kill the Whale"
- "We Have Heaven"
- "South Side of the Sky"
- "And You and I"
- "Heart of the Sunrise"
- "Awaken"
- "I’ve Seen All Good People"
- "Roundabout"

== Personnel ==
- Jon Anderson: Lead Vocals, MIDI Guitar, Harp, and Acoustic Guitar
- Chris Squire: Bass Guitars, Vocals
- Steve Howe: Acoustic & Electric Guitars, Pedal Steel Guitar, Mandolin, and Vocals
- Rick Wakeman: Keyboards
- Alan White: Drums, Percussion
