= The Great Depression (Blindside album) =

Studio album by Blindside
- Released: August 2, 2005
- Recorded: January–April 2005
- Genres: Hardcore punk; alternative rock; hard rock
- Length: 53:28
- Labels: DRT; Wasa
- Producer: Lasse Mårtén

Blindside chronology
About a Burning Fire (2004)	The Great Depression (2005)	With Shivering Hearts We Wait (2011)

Professional ratings
Review scores
Source	Rating
The Phantom Tollbooth	4.5/5 stars
Jesus Freak Hideout	2.5/5 stars

The Great Depression is the fifth studio album by Swedish rock band Blindside. It is their first album for DRT Entertainment. The album was largely influenced by a trip to Africa that their lead singer, Christian, had undertaken. He was very unsettled by his experience and the things he saw influenced the album immensely. The song "Yemkela" was written about a young African boy he met on his trip. The boy had HIV and had less than two months to live. However, in a recent interview, Christian Lindskog revealed that on a recent tour in South Africa, he had seen Yemkela (who Christian expected would be dead) at a show in Cape Town. To Christian's surprise, he was doing well and watched Blindside perform his song and sang along. This Performance was released on a documentary packaged with Blindside's 2011 album "With Shivering Hearts We Wait."

== Track listing ==
1. "The Great Depression" – 1:27
2. "This Is a Heart Attack" – 3:10
3. "Ask Me Now" – 3:34
4. "We're All Going to Die" – 3:00
5. "Yamkela" – 3:38
6. "Put Back the Stars" – 3:57
7. "Fell in Love With the Game" – 4:07
8. "City Lights" – 3:13
9. "We Are to Follow" – 4:02
10. "You Must Be Bleeding Under Your Eyelids" – 4:56
11. "My Alibi" – 4:33
12. "Come to Rest (Hesychia)" – 4:29
13. "This Time" – 4:47
14. "When I Remember" – 4:27

== Singles ==
- "Fell in Love With the Game"
- "When I Remember"

== Personnel ==
- Christian Lindskog – lead vocals
- Simon Grenehed – guitars, backing vocals
- Tomas Näslund – bass guitar
- Marcus Dahlström – Drums

== Guest musicians ==
- J. Jamte – "You Must Be Bleeding Under Your Eyelids"
- Ilkka Viitasalo (of Benea Reach) – "Come to Rest (Hesychia)"
