= With Shivering Hearts We Wait =

Studio album by Blindside
- Released: June 7, 2011
- Studio: 2010-2011 at Bay 7 Studios (Valley Village, CA)
- Genre: Alternative rock; post-hardcore
- Length: 38:53
- Label: INO
- Producer: Mike Plotnikoff; Igor Khoroshev

Blindside chronology
The Great Depression (2005)	With Shivering Hearts We Wait (2011)

Professional ratings
Review scores
Source	Rating
Jesus Freak Hideout	/
Christianity Today	4/5 stars
They Will Rock You	4/5 stars
Rockfreaks.net	8/10 stars
Christian Music Zine	4/5 stars
Kill Your Stereo	4.5/5 stars

With Shivering Hearts We Wait is the sixth studio album by Swedish rock band Blindside. It was released on June 7, 2011 through INO Records.

== Track listing ==
1. "There Must Be Something in the Water" - 3:58
2. "My Heart Escapes" - 3:42
3. "Monster on the Radio" - 3:11
4. "It's All I Have" - 3:51
5. "Bloodstained Hollywood Ending" - 3:15
6. "Our Love Saves Us" - 3:29
7. "Bring Out Your Dead" - 3:41
8. "Withering" - 3:35
9. "Cold" - 3:23
10. "There Must Be Something in the Wind" - 7:03

== Personnel ==
- Christian Lindskog - vocals
- Simon Grenehed - guitar
- Tomas Näslund - bass
- Marcus Dahlström - drums, programming
- Joel Dean - co-writer "Our Love Saves Us"
