= Open Your Eyes (Yes song) =

Promotional single by Yes

from the album Open Your Eyes
- Released: November 1997 (US)
- Genre: Rock
- Length: 5:14 (album version); 4:10 (single version)
- Label: Eagle Records (UK); Beyond Music (US)
- Songwriters: Jon Anderson; Steve Howe; Billy Sherwood; Chris Squire; Alan White
- Producer: Yes

Yes singles chronology
"Walls" (1994)	"Open Your Eyes" (1997)	"Homeworld (The Ladder)" (1999)

"Open Your Eyes" is a song by the progressive rock band Yes, from their 1997 album of the same name. It was a rock radio hit for the band, reaching number 33 on the Billboard Mainstream Rock Tracks chart. It would also be the only song from the Open Your Eyes album that would be performed live regularly during the subsequent tour.

== Details ==
The song was written by singer-songwriter Billy Sherwood and Yes bassist Chris Squire prior to Sherwood joining the band. Originally titled "Wish I Knew", the song was intended for inclusion on a solo album of Squire's. Following the 1997 departure of keyboardist Rick Wakeman from the band, Sherwood was invited to join as the band's second guitarist (primary guitarist Steve Howe having rejoined the group in 1996).

Guitar work by Howe and vocals by Yes lead singer Jon Anderson were added to the song, which was renamed "Open Your Eyes", and writing credits were given to all five Yes members (Sherwood, Squire, Howe, Anderson and drummer Alan White). Toto keyboardist Steve Porcaro performs keyboards on the song, which was the band's first single without a full-time keyboardist in the band. Porcaro had previously played keys with Squire's solo project, The Chris Squire Experiment and also provided keyboards on Yes' album Union.

== Release, reception and re-release ==
The song was released as the lead single from the Open Your Eyes album in 1997, and reached number 33 on the Billboard Hot Mainstream Rock Tracks chart. As of 2021, "Open Your Eyes" is the band's last charting single.

Allmusic reviewer Gary Hill describes the song as a "merge [of] the '70s and '80s Yes styles", noting a similarity in sound to Squire's 1975 solo album Fish Out of Water.

In 2000, Sherwood left the band; that same year he and Squire released an alternate version of "Open Your Eyes" as a hidden track on the Squire/Sherwood album Conspiracy.

Yes has also included their version of "Open Your Eyes" in their 2003 greatest hits compilation The Ultimate Yes: 35th Anniversary Collection, their 2002 boxed set In a Word: Yes (1969–), and several other anthologies.

== Personnel ==
=== Yes ===
- Jon Anderson – vocals
- Steve Howe – guitar
- Billy Sherwood – guitar, keyboards, vocals
- Chris Squire – bass, vocals
- Alan White – drums, percussion, vocals

=== Guest musicians ===
- Steve Porcaro – keyboards

== Charts ==
Chart (1997)	Peak position
US Mainstream Rock (Billboard)	33
