= Pitiful (Blindside song) =

Single by Blindside

from the album Silence
- Released: 15 July 2002
- Length: 3:12
- Label: Elektra
- Songwriters: Christian Lindskog, Simon Grenehed, Tomas Näslund, Marcus Dahlström
- Producer: Howard Benson

Blindside singles chronology
"Pitiful" (2002)	"Sleepwalking" (2003)

"Pitiful" is a song by Swedish rock band Blindside, released as the lead single from their third studio album Silence. The song charted on both the Billboard Mainstream Rock Tracks and Modern Rock Tracks charts, peaking at number 18 and 36 respectively. The song made an appearance on the soundtrack for the 2002 EA Sports video game NHL 2003.

== Reception ==
Writing for Billboard in 2002, Adam G. Keim described "Pitiful" as "harsh and heavy," and noted its rotation on MTV2. Similarly, Greg Miller of the Reading Eagle referred to the song as "highly anticipated," and highlighted that the song was "rising to the top of the charts". The single received three out of five stars from The Bolton News.

Sean Richardson, writing for The Boston Phoenix described the song as "disgraced sinners offering pretty vocal melodies and self-lacerating guitar riffs to God in exchange for forgiveness," highlighting its "vivid crucifixion imagery" and frontman Christian Lindskog's "climactic howl." Richardson also noted the song’s spiritual themes and compared it to the work of P.O.D., while emphasizing Blindside’s more hardcore-influenced sound.

== Live performances ==
The band performed the song on Late Night with Conan O'Brien in September 2002.

== Track listing ==
German CD single

No.	Title	Writer(s)	Length
1.	"Pitiful (album version)"	Blindside	3:12
2.	"December in Sweden (non-album track)"	Blindside	3:22
3.	"Midnight (acoustic version)"	Blindside	4:11

US CD single

No.	Title	Writer(s)	Length
1.	"Pitiful (album version)"	Blindside	3:12

== Personnel ==
- Christian Lindskog – lead vocals
- Simon Grenehed – guitars, backing vocals
- Tomas Näslund – bass guitar
- Marcus Dahlström – drums

== Charts ==
Chart performance for "Pitiful"
Chart (2002–2003)	Peak position
UK Singles (OCC)	171
UK Rock & Metal (Official Charts)	21
US Alternative Airplay (Billboard)	36
US Mainstream Rock Airplay (Billboard)	18

== Cover versions ==
American rock band Saosin covered the song live in 2023, and their performance was later included on their 2024 live album Live at the Garden Amphitheater.
