= Blindside (album) =

Studio album by Blindside
- Released: December 23, 1997
- Genres: Nu metal; alternative metal; Christian rock; post-hardcore
- Length: 44:19
- Labels: Solid State; Day-Glo
- Producer: Lasse Mårtén

Blindside chronology
Blindside (1997)	A Thought Crushed My Mind (2000)

Alternative Cover
- 2005 Re-Release

Professional ratings
Review scores
Source	Rating
Allmusic	2.5/5 stars
Jesus Freak Hideout	4/5 stars

Blindside is the debut studio album by Swedish rock band Blindside, released on Solid State Records in 1997. It was re-released by DRT Entertainment on May 10, 2005 with four unreleased demo tracks.

== Track listing ==
=== United States ===
1. "Invert" – 3:06
2. "Born" – 3:28
3. "Empty Box" – 4:05
4. "Superman" – 2:43
5. "Nerve" – 2:45
6. "This Shoulder" – 3:15
7. "Replay" – 2:46
8. "One Mind" – 4:12
9. "Liberty" – 3:13
10. "Daughter" – 2:24
11. "Teddy Bear" – 4:27
12. "Never" – 4:26

=== 2005 re-release bonus tracks ===
1. "Superman (Demo Version)" - 2:40
2. "Liberty (Demo Version)" - 2:52
3. "Forgiven (Demo)" - 2:42
4. "Stolen (Demo)" - 2:32

The bonus tracks are printed in wrong order on the back of the CD cover. It switches places on Liberty and Superman, and Stolen and Forgiven.

=== Europe ===
1. "Daughter" - 2:25
2. "Liberty" - 3:15
3. "Nerve" - 2:48
4. "Superman" - 2:48
5. "Invert" - 3:09
6. "This Shoulder" - 3:17
7. "One Mind" - 4:19
8. "Sidewinder" - 4:25
9. "Never + Lova Herren" - 6:17

=== Japan ===
1. "Daughter" - 2:25
2. "Liberty" - 3:15
3. "Nerve" - 2:48
4. "Superman" - 2:48
5. "Invert" - 3:09
6. "This Shoulder" - 3:17
7. "One Mind" - 4:19
8. "Sidewinder" - 4:25
9. "Never + Lova Herren" - 6:17
10. "Empty Box" - 4:02
11. "Born" - 3:27
12. "Replay" - 2:45
13. "Teddy Bear" - 4:29
14. "Daughter (Demo Version)" - 2:36

== Personnel ==
- Christian Lindskog - lead vocals
- Simon Grenehed - guitars
- Tomas Näslund - bass guitar
- Marcus Dahlström - drums
