= Open Your Eyes (Yes album) =

Studio album by Yes
- Released: 24 November 1997
- Recorded: 1997
- Genres: Progressive rock; pop rock
- Length: 72:06
- Labels: Eagle (UK); Beyond (US)
- Producer: Yes

Yes chronology
Keys to Ascension 2 (1997)	Open Your Eyes (1997)	The Ladder (1999)

Open Your Eyes is the seventeenth studio album by the English rock band Yes, released in November 1997 by Eagle Records in the UK and by Beyond Music in the US. Following the 1996 revival of the 1970s "classic" line-up of Yes, the band's relationship with management had broken down and keyboardist Rick Wakeman had once again left the band. While various other members dispersed, guitarist, keyboardist, and producer Billy Sherwood (a long-time Yes associate and contributor) began developing new songs with band bassist and de facto leader Chris Squire to prevent the band from losing momentum and fully splitting. Yes' new management company suggested adding a couple of songs originally written for Squire and Sherwood's other band Conspiracy to help build up material for a new Yes studio album. With the writing and production sessions dominated by Squire and Sherwood, and with singer Jon Anderson, guitarist Steve Howe and drummer Alan White only involved later in the process, the writing and creative input of the latter three members was limited.

Open Your Eyes received mixed reviews from music critics and became one of the band's lowest selling albums, reaching number 151 on the US Billboard 200 and failing to enter the UK Albums Chart. Its lead single, "Open Your Eyes", reached number 33 on the Billboard Hot Mainstream Rock Tracks chart which was followed by a second, "New State of Mind". A limited edition with a surround sound mix was also released. Yes supported the album with a 12-month world tour from October 1997 that coincided with their thirtieth anniversary. The band were joined by Russian keyboardist Igor Khoroshev, who had played on the album as a guest musician and who became a full-time member at the tour's conclusion.

== Background ==
By mid-1997, the Yes line-up of singer Jon Anderson, bassist Chris Squire, guitarist Steve Howe, keyboardist Rick Wakeman, and drummer Alan White had recorded Keys to Ascension (1996) and Keys to Ascension 2 (1997), two double albums containing live and studio material recorded in 1995 and 1996. The studio tracks on Keys To Ascension 2 were co-produced by American musician Billy Sherwood, who befriended Squire in 1989 and wrote songs together at a time when Anderson had left the band and Sherwood was being considered as his replacement. Sherwood had also contributed to the band's album Union (1991) and played additional guitar and keyboards on their Talk (1994) tour.

When a tour in support of the Keys to Ascension albums was being planned, Yes suffered a setback after Wakeman, who disagreed with how Keys to Ascension 2 was to be packaged and promoted and was unable to commit to touring due to solo commitments and management conflicts, left the band causing dates booked for June and July 1997 to be cancelled. Band talks with their then-manager Jon Brewer broke down, leaving Anderson to retreat to Hawaii and White and Howe returning home to Seattle and England, respectively. Sherwood recalled Brewer "didn't have a clue", adding: "I just grabbed the ball and said, 'I'm not going to watch my favorite band go down here. I've got to do something, let's start writing some songs.'"

With Squire and Sherwood based in California, the pair resumed work on songs for a new album by their own band, Conspiracy. As development progressed, Yes secured new management in mid-1997 with the Left Bank Organization who devised an 18-month plan for the band, which the group approved as they were in need of some direction and organisation. Left Bank also wished to hear all the material that the band in general were working on. Included in the music submitted were songs by Conspiracy, which Left Bank suggested would sound stronger if they were reworked for a Yes studio album, leading to Squire and Sherwood putting forward "Open Your Eyes" and "Man in the Moon" for development. Sherwood maintained that apart from the title track, the rest of the material for Open Your Eyes was written during this time by Squire, Anderson, White, and himself. Left Bank also wished for the band to begin touring in late 1997 in time for the autumn touring schedule, leaving a limited amount of time for the band to complete the new studio album. Matters were complicated further when Castle Communications learned of the band's intentions to tour, and pushed for the release of Keys to Ascension 2 near the same time as Open Your Eyes.

== Recording and music ==
The songwriting process started with Sherwood mailing tapes of early versions of "Wonderlove", "Love Shine", "New State of Mind", and "Universal Garden" to Anderson who liked them and recorded vocals from his studio in Hawaii and returned them. The tapes were then sent to White who also liked the songs and flew to Los Angeles to record new drum tracks. "All of a sudden", recalled Sherwood, "it had that [Yes] flavor even more". As Yes were without a keyboardist during this time, he played the parts himself. The tapes were then sent to Howe in England, and he learned that the group were interested to produce a new studio album based on the material. Howe resisted the idea as the upcoming Keys to Ascension 2 already had fresh studio material on it in the "classic" Yes style, and considered the new songs being developed as too pop-oriented and commercial, yet agreed to be involved as he knew the band needed to keep going.

According to Sherwood, Howe declined to fly over and join the album's initial writing and recording sessions and instead arrived towards its completion. Howe claimed that Anderson and himself had little collaborative input, saying the two were "squeezed, pushed, undermixed and not allowed to develop and change that music," and added: "So we went into that almost like a group blind-folded, because we started doing [the album]. I kept saying, 'No, it doesn't sound like Yes.' People said, 'Yes, but we have to get it on radio!' I replied, 'No, it's going to lose our fans!'" Despite being uneasy with the material initially, Howe also stated that "From 'Wonderlove' on, I'm a happy guy; I'm sold. There's more familiarity, more of a balance of what the group really did sound like when we were carving this record. The earlier tracks have more of other peoples' view, which isn't as easy to live with, but you win some and you lose some."

"Open Your Eyes" was originally a Conspiracy song titled "Wish I Knew". "Fortune Seller" features the lyric "1-800", a reference to toll-free telephone numbers advertised by television psychics that Sherwood, an avid television viewer, would come across on the screen in his studio. Its original title was "Fortune Teller", but Sherwood agreed to change it to "Fortune Seller" upon Anderson's suggestion which he thought was better. "Somehow Someday" contains parts of the Celtic-influenced song "Boundaries" which had originally appeared on Anderson's 1982 solo album Animation and was subsequently reworked on his 1997 solo album The Promise Ring as "O'er". "From the Balcony" originated from Anderson and Howe towards the end of the album's production, and was quickly recorded and produced. Despite being a more gentle, acoustic ballad, Anderson said of its meaning: "It's basically all about past managers who could be difficult sometimes ... As the song evolved ... it seemed to be more about higher consciousness of the audience and it seemed like someone was looking down on us to make sure everything was okay".

After Squire and White backed the idea for Sherwood to become a full-time member of Yes, Anderson and Howe agreed on the condition that they bring in Igor Khoroshev, a Russian keyboardist who they had heard tapes of and wished to have him for the Open Your Eyes tour; Anderson had discovered Khoroshev through mutual contacts at a software manufacturing company. Although Sherwood played the bulk of the keyboards on-record, a dedicated live keyboardist was required as he preferred to play guitar rather than keyboards on-stage. As Sherwood was mixing Open Your Eyes, Anderson suggested that Khoroshev play some parts on the album and he went into the studio to put down overdubs on "New State of Mind", "No Way We Can Lose", and "Fortune Seller", the last of which was notable for Khoroshev's Hammond organ solo. Additional keyboards had already been performed by Toto founder Steve Porcaro on "Open Your Eyes"; Porcaro originally played on the song when it was a Conspiracy track, and his parts were retained for Yes' rendition. Upon the album's completion, Sherwood became a full-time member of Yes.

== Release and reception ==
Professional ratings
Review scores
Source	Rating
AllMusic	2/5 stars
Entertainment Weekly	C+
The Rolling Stone Album Guide	2/5 stars
Uncut	3/5 stars
Vox	3/5 stars

Open Your Eyes was scheduled for release in early 1998, but when Left Bank saw that Keys to Ascension 2 was set for release in November 1997, they wished for it to be released sooner than its originally planned date. Open Your Eyes was released on 24 November 1997 and went on to become one of the band's lowest selling albums. It peaked at number 151 on the Billboard 200 in the US during a one-week stay on the chart for the week of 13 December 1997. The album failed to make a presence on the UK Albums Chart. Yes released two singles from the album, "Open Your Eyes" and "New State of Mind", the former reaching number 33 on the Billboard Hot Mainstream Rock Tracks chart. Sherwood estimated the album sold around 200,000 copies.

Open Your Eyes received mixed reactions from critics and fans upon release. Many criticised it for its overproduction and lack of the trademark "proggy" Yes sound, though others praised it for its upbeat nature. Chuck Eddy of Entertainment Weekly graded the album a C+ and felt that on Open Your Eyes, Yes were "Neither as self-indulgent nor as magnificent as they're capable of being," and thought the album would "never quite manage the down-to-earth hooks that have kicked their best cosmic explorations into high gear." AllMusic's Gary Hill rated the album 2 out of 5 stars, saying it "is not fully appreciated on the first few listenings. You really need to give this one the time to sink in." He listed "Open Your Eyes", "Universal Garden", "Fortune Seller", and "Wonderlove" as among the album's stronger songs, with "No Way We Can Lose" and "Man in the Moon" being weaker ones.

Stereogum ranked Open Your Eyes 32 out of 33 in their countdown of Yes' discography, saying it "is slathered in the most dismally begging-for-airplay keyboards imaginable, and written at a child's level of musical sophistication. It's hard to even believe this is a Yes album." However, music portal Ultimate Classic Rock ranked Open Your Eyes thirteenth out of 21 in its list of best Yes albums, praising the album for paying tribute to the band's 1970s works while also "point[ing] the way towards a possible future for the band, one that eschewed resting on their laurels."

In 1997, a limited edition surround sound version of Open Your Eyes was released, containing a surround mix developed by Seattle Audio Imaging Labs, Inc. with an encoding system more suitable for home theatre audio systems. This version had the ambient section of "The Solution" omitted. In 2006, Open Your Eyes was reissued as part of the Yes album box set Essentially Yes.

Yes supported Open Your Eyes with a 12-month world tour that saw the band perform in smaller venues such as theatres and amphitheatres. The Alan Parsons Live Project was the opening act on select dates. The show at the Universal Amphitheatre in Los Angeles saw the band joined on stage with a school choir for a performance of "No Way We Can Lose".

== Track listing ==
All tracks are written by Chris Squire, Billy Sherwood, Alan White, Jon Anderson, Steve Howe.

Open Your Eyes track listing
No.	Title	Length
1.	"New State of Mind"	6:00
2.	"Open Your Eyes"	5:14
3.	"Universal Garden"	6:16
4.	"No Way We Can Lose"	4:56
5.	"Fortune Seller"	5:00
6.	"Man in the Moon"	4:41
7.	"Wonderlove"	6:06
8.	"From the Balcony"	2:43
9.	"Love Shine"	4:37
10.	"Somehow, Someday"	4:47
11.	"The Solution"	5:25
12.	"The Source" (hidden track)	16:21

Note: "The Solution" lasts for 5:25 and is followed by two minutes of silence, then a hidden track, titled "The Source", consisting of nature sounds intermixed with vocal snippets from the album, lasts for 16:22; their combined length is 23:47.

== Personnel ==
Yes

- Jon Anderson – lead vocals
- Steve Howe – guitar, steel guitar, mandolin, banjo, vocals
- Billy Sherwood – guitar, keyboards, vocals, recording, mixing
- Chris Squire – bass guitar, harmonica, vocals
- Alan White – drums, percussion, vocals

Additional personnel

- Steve Porcaro – additional keyboards on "Open Your Eyes"
- Igor Khoroshev – additional keyboards on "New State of Mind", "No Way We Can Lose" and "Fortune Seller"

=== Production ===
- Yes – production
- Randy Nicklaus – mixing
- Joe Gastwirt – mastering at Oceanview Digital Mastering

== Charts ==
Chart (1997)	Peak position
Japanese Albums (Oricon)	81
US Billboard 200	151
