= Hank Van Sickle =

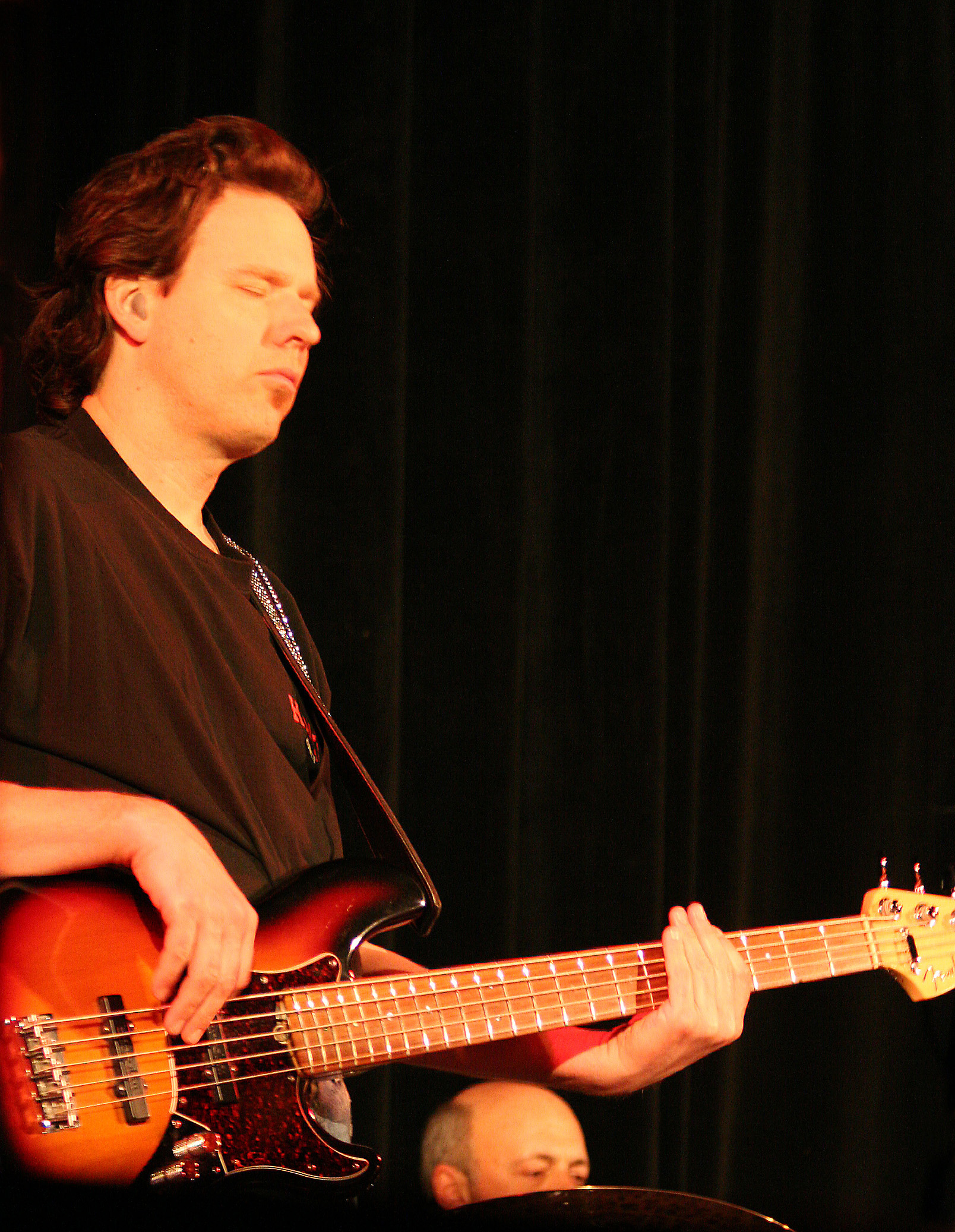
- Van Sickle with John Mayall, performing in Hilo, Hawaii; February 4, 2006

Background information
- Born: 31 December 1961 (age 64); Pittsburgh, Pennsylvania, U.S.
- Genres: Blues rock, jazz fusion, Americana, blues
- Occupation: Musician
- Instruments: Bass guitar, upright bass
- Labels: Eagle, Rounder, Cleopatra, Storyville, Del-Fi, Private Stash Records
- Website: Hank Van Sickle website

Hank Van Sickle (born December 31, 1961, in Pittsburgh, Pennsylvania) is an American electric and upright bassist, best known for the blues rock band John Mayall and the Bluesbreakers. He is currently living in Southern California.

== Biography ==
Hank Van Sickle was raised in a family of musicians. His father, Rodney Van Sickle was a classically trained double bassist who graduated from the Curtis Institute of Music and played in the Pittsburgh Symphony Orchestra, the Cleveland Orchestra, and the Toronto Symphony Orchestra. His sister Lucy Van Sickle is a singer and blues harmonica player living in Pittsburgh.

Hank Van Sickle is best known for blues, blues-rock, roots rock, and jazz; he is also experienced in symphonic, rockabilly, world music, rock, Americana, pop, folk, country, punk rock, and experimental. He recorded and toured as a member of John Mayall's Bluesbreakers from mid 2000 through the end of 2008. According to John Mayall, the longest tenure of any bass player with the band.

Other credits include Jimmy Smith, Mick Taylor, Robben Ford, Rod Piazza and the Mighty Flyers, Taj Mahal, Candye Kane, Guitar Shorty, Smokey Wilson, American Idol stars tour, Gary Myrick, Debbie Davies, Denny Freeman, Don and Dewey, Kirk Fletcher, The Drifters, Rosie Flores, Wanda Jackson, James Intveld, Billy Swan, Yma Sumac, Judy Tenuta, Ray Campi, Floyd Sneed, Beach Cities Symphony, and Friends of Dean Martinez.

== Discography ==
With John Mayall

- In the Palace of the King (Eagle Records)
- Essentially John Mayall (Eagle Records)
- Road Dogs (Eagle Records)
- 70th Birthday Concert featuring Eric Clapton, Chris Barber and Mick Taylor (Eagle Records) (DVD and CD)
- Stories (Eagle Records)
- Cookin' Down Under (Private Stash Records) (DVD)
- No Days Off (Private Stash Records)
- Bluesbreakers Now (Uxbridge)
- John Mayall And The Bluesbreakers With Mick Taylor St Albans 2004 (Uxbridge)

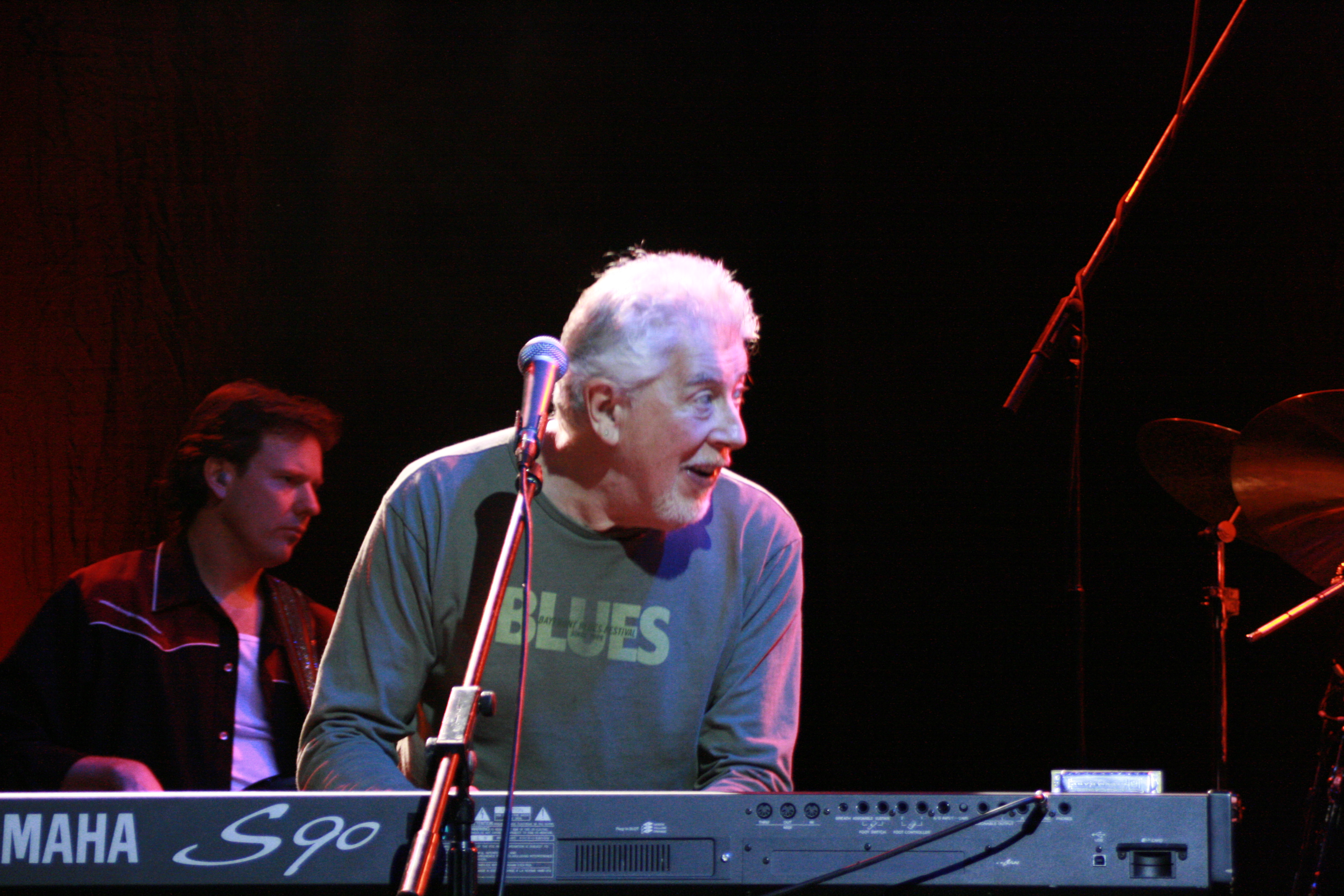
Hank Van Sickle (background) and John Mayall (The Bluesbreakers at the Corn Exchange, Cambridge, November 2006)

With Friends of Dean Martinez

- Retrograde (Sub Pop).
- Keep Left, Vol. 1: A Benefit for David Barsamain and Alternative Radio (Go Big)

With Skip Heller

- Couch, Los Angeles (Couch 2.0) (Jewbilee)
- Career Suicide: The Essential Skip Heller (Dionysus)
- Couch, Los Angeles (Mouthpiece/Rounder)
- St. Christopher's Arms (Mouthpiece/Rounder)

With others

- Rod Piazza and the Mighty Flyers: Almighty Dollar (Delta Groove)
- Todd Rundgren: Todd Rundgren Reconstructed (Cleopatra)
- Sugaray Rayford: Blind Alley (www.sugarayblues.com)
- Gary Myrick: Blues Trash (Self Produced)
- Wyland Blues Planet Band: Blues Planet I (Wyland Records)
- Wyland Blues Planet Band: Blues Planet II (Wyland Records)
- Wyland Blues Planet Band: Blues Planet III (Wyland Records)
- Wyland Blues Planet Band: Blues Planet Sounds DVD (Wyland Records)
- Ian Whitcomb and Skip Heller: Barenstark Bear Essentials (Bear Family)
- Ian Whitcomb: Songs Without Words (Rivermont)
- Barry Levenson: The Late Show (Rip Cat Records)
- Barry Levenson: The Visit (Rip Cat Records)
- Barry Levenson featuring Johnny Dyer: Hard Times Won (Storyville)
- Ilana Katz Katz: Subway Stories (Vizztone)
- Ilana Katz Katz: Movin' On (Regina Royal)
- Bugs Henderson Tribute: The King of Clubs (Self Produced)
- John Zipperer: Devil Rail (Self Produced)
- Tom Kell & Paula Fong: The Other Side of Sorrow (Self Produced)
- Lauren Adams: Somewhere Else (Self Produced)
- Matt Doherty: Dignity (Self Produced)
- Wes Race: Blue Whalin' in Camarillo, Volume One (Race Records)
- Orphan Jon: Abandoned No More (Ripcat Records)
- The Blue Dahlia: A Tribute to Frank Sinatra (Cleopatra)
- Maggie Mayall: Dig This (Self Produced)
- Lisa Finnie: Lisa Finnie (Chirp)
- Dennis Herrera Blues Band: Blues Well Done! (JulDen)
- Dennis Herrera Blues Band: Livin' Life Not Worryin' (Self Produced)
- Steamin' Stan Ruffo and the Instigators: Jump On This! (Sho' Nuff)
- Steamin' Stan Ruffo and the Instigators: Blues On Tap, Volume One (Sho' Nuff)
- Steamin' Stan Ruffo and the Instigators: Santa Cruz Blues (Bluestraxx)
- Steamin' Stan Ruffo and the Instigators: More Desaster City Blues (Taxim)
- Joe Gorfinkle: Take a Chance (Self Produced)
- Rocky Jackson: Testify! (High Life Records)
- Bob Pacemaker Newham and the Blue Vanguards: So Cal Barbeque (Self Produced)
- Gedina Jean Bergstrom: Introducing Gedina Jean (Self Produced)
- Indigo Triangle: Code of the Heart (Mountain Castle Music)
- Claudia Russell: Ready to Receive (Radio Rhythm Records)
- Anny Celsi: Little Black Dress & Other Stories (Ragazza Music)
- Rip Masters: Big Red '57 (Rattler)
- Rudy Rotta: Some of My Favorite Songs For... (Sling Slang)
- Billy Sheets: Please Tell Me Why (Big Clock)
- Dennis Spencer: They Call Me The Tall Guy (Tall Guy Music)
- Farina: Shots in the Dark (Del-Fi)
- Edwing Sankey: Trapdoor (Positone)
