= Fly from Here =

2011 studio album by Yes

Studio album by Yes
- Released: 22 June 2011
- Recorded: October 2010–February 2011
- Studios: SARM West Studios (London, England); SARM West Coast (Los Angeles, California); Langley Studios (Devon, England); Schwartz Studios (Sussex, England)
- Genre: Progressive rock
- Length: 47:28
- Label: Frontiers
- Producer: Trevor Horn

Yes chronology
Union Live (2011)	Fly from Here (2011)	In the Present – Live from Lyon (2011)

Singles from Fly from Here
- 1. "We Can Fly" Released: 13 June 2011

Fly from Here is the twentieth studio album by the English progressive rock band Yes. It was released on 22 June 2011 by Frontiers Records, and is their only album featuring lead vocalist Benoît David and keyboardist Oliver Wakeman. Its ten-year gap from Magnification (2001) marks the longest between two Yes studio albums to date. Yes reformed in 2008 after a four-year hiatus with a line-up of David, Wakeman, bassist Chris Squire, guitarist Steve Howe, and drummer Alan White. The band prepared material to record for Fly from Here during breaks in touring in 2010 and 2011, during which they enlisted former Yes frontman Trevor Horn as producer. After songs contributed by Wakeman were scrapped in favour of expanding the song "We Can Fly" into a 24-minute six-part "Fly from Here" suite, the band replaced him with former Yes keyboardist Geoff Downes as he co-wrote much of the new material.

Fly from Here received mixed to positive reviews from music critics, and peaked at No. 30 on the UK Albums Chart and No. 36 on the US Billboard 200. Yes promoted the album with a video release of "We Can Fly" and worldwide tours in 2011 and 2012, during which David was replaced by singer Jon Davison after he contracted respiratory illness. An alternative version of the album titled Fly from Here – Return Trip, featuring new lead vocals and mixing from Horn and instrumental parts, was released on 25 March 2018 during the band's fiftieth anniversary tour.

== Background and writing ==
In September 2004, the Yes line-up of singer Jon Anderson, bassist Chris Squire, guitarist Steve Howe, keyboardist Rick Wakeman, and drummer Alan White began a five-year hiatus. By March 2008, plans for their Close to the Edge and Back Tour in celebration of the band's fortieth anniversary were in progress. Wakeman was advised not to participate for health reasons and recommended his son Oliver Wakeman as a replacement, which the band accepted. However, all plans were cancelled in May 2008 after Anderson had an asthma attack and was diagnosed with respiratory failure. With further time required for Anderson to recover, Squire, White and Howe wished to waste no more time and continued with rehearsals for a rescheduled tour with Oliver Wakeman in the line-up. In June, during their search for a new singer, Squire invited Benoît David, a Canadian singer who fronted the Yes cover band Close to the Edge, to join the band. Squire found out about David after he saw a video of the group performing on YouTube and was impressed with his ability to sing in a style similar to Anderson. Yes toured worldwide from November 2008 to December 2010, during which they agreed to start work on a new studio album, the band's first since Magnification (2001).

Yes started on the album in March 2010 during their stay in Phoenix, Arizona, during which ideas of songs from Howe, Squire, and Wakeman were selected to develop further with the intention of Howe and Wakeman as co-producers with Wakeman as recording engineer. Wakeman recalled a period of "lovely integration" between the three of them during this time, although Squire wanted greater involvement in the production and David was unsure if the decision for the band self-produce was right. Wakeman then suggested that Yes contact producer and former Yes frontman Trevor Horn, who had replaced a departing Anderson in 1980 and sung on Drama (1980) with Geoff Downes, his partner in The Buggles, on keyboards, to bring more validity to the album.

Horn accepted the invitation, and the group initially planned to work with Horn only on "We Can Fly", a song that originated from a demo titled "We Can Fly from Here" that Horn and Downes had recorded prior to their arrival in Yes. The song was performed live during the Drama tour in 1980, and the band rehearsed it for a short while with session drummer Paul Robinson. When Yes disbanded in 1981, Horn and Downes recorded a second demo of "We Can Fly from Here", this time as a two-part song that was released on a reissue of The Buggles's second album Adventures in Modern Recording (1981). Before David put down his vocal tracks, Horn recorded vocals himself for him to use as a guide, so David could "sing it exactly the same way".

== Recording ==
The first recording sessions took place in October and November 2010 at SARM West Coast Studios in Los Angeles, and lasted around six weeks with Horn present for two. Horn left for a month to work on other commitments, during which the band worked on "We Can Fly", "Into the Storm", "Hour of Need", and "The Man You Always Wanted Me to Be", plus songs that Wakeman had been involved with, namely "Gift of Love" (a Squire/Wakeman co-write, related to "The Game" on Heaven & Earth), "To the Moment", and "Words on a Page". Wakeman had started on two more, "From the Turn of a Card" and "Credit Carnival", which he later recorded on Ravens and Lullabies with Gordon Giltrap. The Wakeman-led material was released on the EP From a Page (2019).

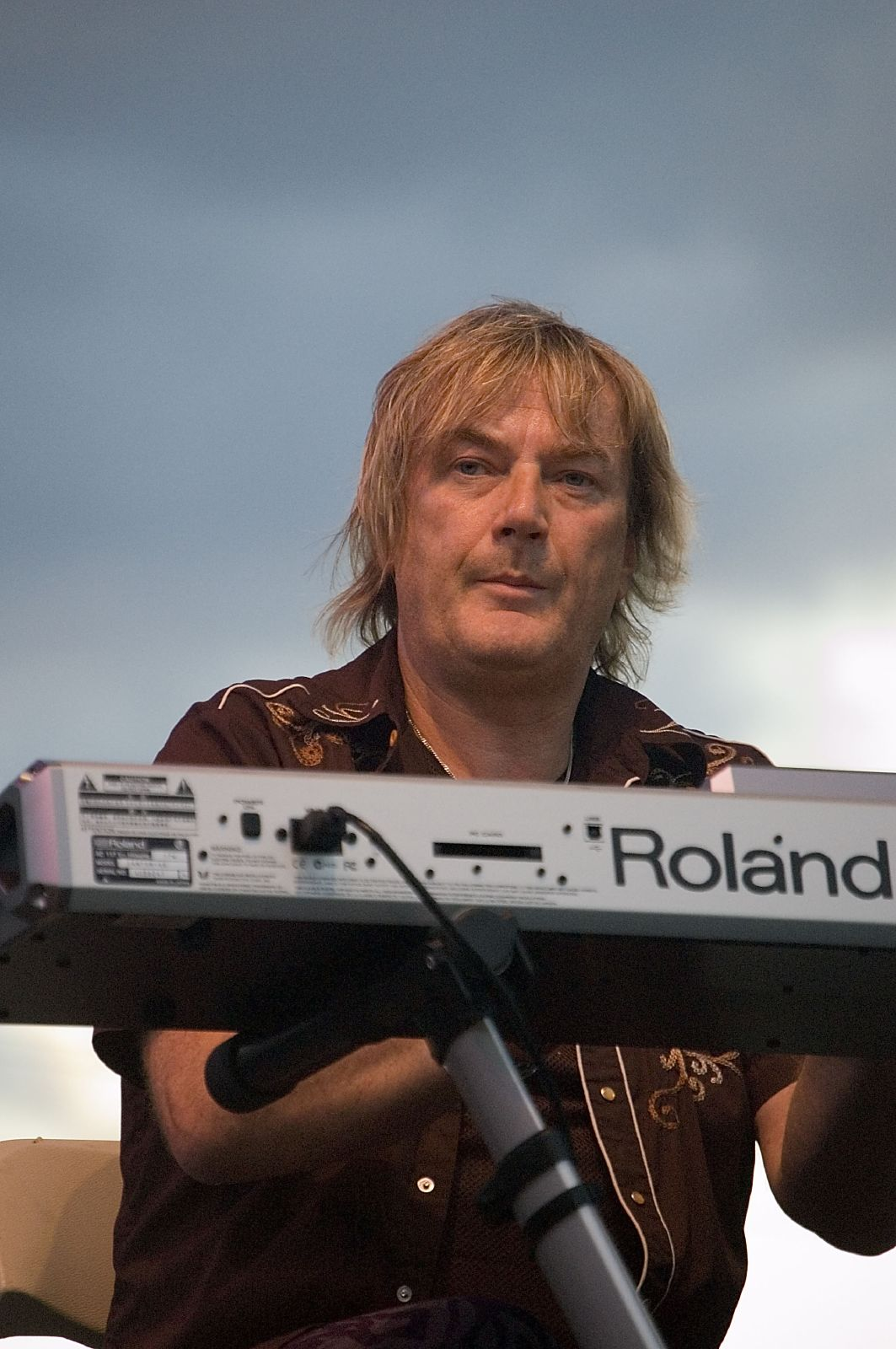
Geoff Downes replaced keyboardist Oliver Wakeman midway through recording

By the time recording picked up with Horn in the first week of January 2011, the band had discussed Horn's suggestion of expanding "We Can Fly" into a longform piece and decided to pursue it; Howe said "We couldn't turn that down. It was too good an offer". Wakeman resisted the idea, as the band was midway through recording enough material that they and Horn had agreed to. This resulted in Wakeman's songs being scrapped to make room for the 24-minute six-part "Fly from Here suite", with the two "We Can Fly from Here" demos plus an unreleased third used as the basis of the "We Can Fly", "Sad Night at the Airfield", and "Madman at the Screens" sections. The reissue of Adventures in Modern Recording also contained "Riding a Tide", another Buggles demo that was reworked into "Life on a Film Set". "Sad Night at the Airfield", "Madman at the Screens", and "Life on a Film Set" were all written for the second Buggles album, but Downes has described them as "heavily influenced by our stint in Yes at the time." Further contributions to the "Fly from Here" suite were made by Squire and Howe, the latter contributing the two-minute instrumental section "Bumpy Ride".

The band agreed that an album with partial contributions from Horn made little sense, so they enlisted Horn to produce the entire record. During the Christmas break, Wakeman learned that the band had been working with Downes more over time and wanted to bring him in as full-time keyboardist. Howe said that as a co-writer of the "Fly from Here" demos, Downes was better suited to the rest of the album's material. Horn later wrote that he convinced the band to have Downes return as they wrote the song together. Wakeman left, taking the tracks that he worked on with the band with his collaborations with Gordon Giltrap and his solo album Cultural Vandals.

Horn produced the album using the digital audio workstation software Pro Tools. He recalled the difficult task of coaching David to sing the English lyrics as he wanted them, given his French-Canadian accent, which took further time. The album was mixed in April 2011 at SARM West Studios in London, where additional vocals were recorded. Tim Weidner, who had also worked on Magnification, mixed and engineer the album. When the album was completed, Howe was pleased with its overall length as he can listen through without feeling tired by the end, and recognised the band had made a record that the band were all happy with.

The cover was designed by artist Roger Dean, who has created many of the group's previous album covers. It is a painting he started in 1970 but had remained uncompleted. He finished it in the style of his current works, but the colour and texture were kept from the original.

== Music ==
In the "Fly from Here" suite, Howe plays his Gibson ES-175, his signature model 6-string Martin MC-38, and a 12-string Martin J12-16 guitars. "Sad Night at the Airfield" features 16 bars of Howe on a Ramirez Spanish 1A, during which he follows the vocal melody closely. He was inspired to do so from hearing songs by Alison Krauss and Union Station. The section also features Howe playing a Fender Dual 6 Professional steel guitar which allowed him to play high notes. The song also features Horn playing his Gibson acoustic guitar during the introduction, of which squeaking can be heard as a result of his playing. Howe tried using a Fender Stratocaster for the pizzicato to "We Can Fly", but his distaste for its sound made him switch to a Gibson Les Paul Junior and use the Stratocaster elsewhere.

=== Songs ===
"The Man You Always Wanted Me to Be" was co-written by Squire with friends Gerard Johnson and Simon Sessler. The song was set to have David sing the lead vocals, but the singer was "not too crazy" about it and insisted that Squire sing it instead. The band told him that the song should be sung by the lead singer, but Horn decided to record it with Squire regardless, which David felt happy about as he thought Squire sang it better than he could.

"Hour of Need", credited solely to Howe and sung by him in unison with David, deals with the need to solve world problems such as food and water shortages, and use of nature's resources. After the song was recorded, Horn suggested to the group that they add more instrumentation to it, which prompted them to record an extended version with instrumental sections before and after. The introduction originated from one of Howe's demos that borrows ideas from Concierto de Aranjuez by Joaquín Rodrigo. Horn did not have the piece in mind when he suggested the idea and felt it did not fit the overall theme of the album, so it was used as a bonus track on the Japanese edition of the album.

"Solitaire" is an acoustic guitar solo by Howe. It is a piece that was in development for several years prior to recording. Bits of the piece date back to when he was preparing material for his solo album Motif (2008) but felt it was not ready for release on an album as it needed further work. Howe plays a custom built Theo Scharpach SKD, a handmade steel-string acoustic guitar built for him in 1989.

"Into the Storm" features an introduction developed by Howe, which did not feature one at all in its original form. The lyrics were written collectively and with relative ease; Howe described them: "Very light. It's a series of in-jokes by the band. [...] a little tongue in cheek". The song originated from a bass riff from Squire that was among the ideas discussed while the band were in Phoenix, played with added flanger and phaser effects. David contributed parts of the lyrics and the melody, including the chorus in a 7/8 time signature, and felt good to have contributed to the album.

== Release and reception ==
Professional ratings
Aggregate scores
Source	Rating
AnyDecentMusic?	5.1/10
Metacritic	53/100
Review scores
Source	Rating
AllMusic	3.5/5 stars
The A.V. Club	C
Blurt	7/10 stars
Classic Rock	4/5 stars
Daily Express	3/5 stars
The Guardian	2/5 stars
Paste	8.2/10
PopMatters	6/10
Rolling Stone	2/5 stars
Uncut	2/5 stars

Fly from Here was released on 22 June 2011, on Frontiers Records in Europe and North America and on Avalon in Japan. Fly From Here entered the French charts at number 147 and climbed to 134 a week later. The album entered the Japanese charts at number 56, the UK charts at number 30, selling 5,242 copies in its first week, and the Scottish charts at number 19. The album made number 43 in the Netherlands and number 31 in Sweden. The album debuted at number 36 in the US, dropping to number 97 in its second week, making it the first Yes album since Talk to spend two weeks in the top 100.

== Track listing ==
Fly from Here
No.	Title	Writer(s)	Length
1.	"Fly from Here – Overture"	Trevor Horn, Geoff Downes	1:54
2.	"Fly from Here, Pt. I: We Can Fly"	Horn, Downes, Chris Squire	6:00
3.	"Fly from Here, Pt. II: Sad Night at the Airfield"	Horn, Downes	6:41
4.	"Fly from Here, Pt. III: Madman at the Screens"	Horn, Downes	5:17
5.	"Fly from Here, Pt. IV: Bumpy Ride"	Steve Howe	2:15
6.	"Fly from Here, Pt. V: We Can Fly (Reprise)"	Horn, Downes, Squire	1:40
7.	"The Man You Always Wanted Me to Be"	Squire, Gerard Johnson, Simon Sessler	5:01
8.	"Life on a Film Set"	Horn, Downes	4:57
9.	"Hour of Need"	Howe	3:07
10.	"Solitaire"	Howe	3:30
11.	"Into the Storm"	Squire, Oliver Wakeman, Howe, Horn, Benoît David, Alan White	6:49

Japanese issue bonus track
No.	Title	Writer(s)	Length
12.	"Hour of Need" (Full-length Version)	Howe	6:45

== Fly from Here – Return Trip ==
Fly from Here – Return Trip

Studio album (reissue) by Yes
- Released: 25 March 2018
- Recorded: October 2010–February 2011, 2016–2017
- Genre: Progressive rock
- Length: 53:37
- Label: Yes 97 LLC
- Producer: Trevor Horn

Yes chronology
Topographic Drama – Live Across America (2017)	Fly from Here – Return Trip (2018)	The Steven Wilson Remixes (2018)

In 2016, the band pitched an idea to Horn of having him re-record the lead vocals himself. White, who suggested the idea, reminded Horn that if he did, it would mark the second album recorded with the same line-up that had recorded Drama (1980). Horn cited this as the factor that made his decision and said, "So I thought: why not? Because I have to live with the album for the rest of my life, so I might as well re-do it." Work began in May 2016 after Horn performed on stage with Yes in London during their 2016 European tour, the band travelling to the studio the following day to oversee the production. Horn remixed the album and rearranged some sections in the process, reasoning that he and Downes had co-written much of the material and thus "Didn't have to answer to anybody!" Horn found that his vocals were "harder" and cut through the songs more than David's had done, which affected his mixing choices. He cited "Hour of Need" as a particular track that was improved in comparison to the original. Downes and Howe also recorded new keyboard and guitar overdubs, respectively.

The new version, titled Fly from Here – Return Trip, was released on 25 March 2018 through PledgeMusic and at the two-day fan convention in London during the band's fiftieth anniversary tour. The album also includes the full version of "Hour of Need," the previously unreleased track "Don't Take No for an Answer," written and sung by Howe and recorded by the group during the album's sessions, and additional liner notes by Horn. Downes felt the new version sounded refreshing and that Horn's remixes added "a whole new dimension to the original recordings."

=== Track listing ===
Fly from Here – Return Trip
No.	Title	Writer(s)	Length
1.	"Fly from Here – Overture"	Horn, Downes	1:52
2.	"Fly from Here, Part I: We Can Fly"	Horn, Downes, Squire	5:04
3.	"Fly from Here, Part II: Sad Night at the Airfield"	Horn, Downes	5:25
4.	"Fly from Here, Part III: Madman at the Screens"	Horn, Downes	4:36
5.	"Fly from Here, Part IV: Bumpy Ride"	Howe	2:16
6.	"Fly from Here, Part V: We Can Fly (Reprise)"	Horn, Downes, Squire	2:18
7.	"The Man You Always Wanted Me to Be"	Squire, Johnson, Sessler	5:25
8.	"Life on a Film Set"	Horn, Downes	5:06
9.	"Hour of Need"	Howe	6:46 (Note: On Youtube, it's listed as 6:15 with a fade-out. But the Complete Return Trip edition on Youtube shows the full version without the fade)
10.	"Solitaire"	Howe	3:31
11.	"Don't Take No for an Answer"	Howe	4:22
12.	"Into the Storm"	Squire, Wakeman, Howe, Horn, David, White	6:55

== Personnel ==
Credits adapted from the album's liner notes.

=== Yes ===
- Benoît David – lead vocals (2011 edition)
- Steve Howe – guitars, backing vocals, co-lead vocals on "Hour of Need", lead vocals on "Don't Take No for an Answer" (2018 edition)
- Chris Squire – bass guitar, backing vocals, lead vocals on "The Man You Always Wanted Me to Be"
- Alan White – drums
- Geoff Downes – keyboards
- Trevor Horn – lead vocals (2018 edition), backing vocals, additional acoustic guitar on "Sad Night at the Airfield"

=== Additional musicians ===
- Oliver Wakeman – additional keyboards on "We Can Fly", "We Can Fly (Reprise)", "Hour of Need", and "Into the Storm"
- Luís Jardim – percussion

=== Production ===
- Tim Weidner – mixing, engineering
- John Davis – mastering at Metropolis Studios, London
- Patrick MacDougall – additional engineering
- Mark Lewis – additional engineering
- Graham Archer – additional engineering
- Simon Bloor – assistant engineer
- Andy Hughes – assistant engineer
- Edd Hartwell – assistant engineer
- Brad Brooks – assistant engineer
- Joel M. Peters – mixing, engineer, mastering (2018 edition)
- Cameron Gower Poole – mixing, engineering (2018 edition)
- Josh Tyrell – assistance (2018 edition)
- Curtis Schwartz – engineering on "Solitaire"
- Steve Howe – engineering on "Solitaire"
- Rob Shanahan – photographs
- Roger Dean – paintings, font, Yes logos
- Giulio Cataldo – booklet design

== Charts ==
Chart performance for Fly From Here
Chart (2011)	Peak position
Belgian Albums (Ultratop Wallonia)	45
Dutch Albums (Album Top 100)	43
French Albums (SNEP)	134
German Albums (Offizielle Top 100)	16
Italian Albums (FIMI)	49
Japanese Albums (Oricon)	56
Norwegian Albums (VG-lista)	24
Scottish Albums (Official Charts)	19
Swedish Albums (Sverigetopplistan)	31
Swiss Albums (Schweizer Hitparade)	39
UK Albums (Official Charts)	30
UK Independent Albums (Official Charts)	18
US Billboard 200	36
US Independent Albums (Billboard)	7
US Top Rock Albums (Billboard)	9
US Indie Store Album Sales (Billboard)	4
