= Blindsided =

Blindsided may refer to:

== Film and TV ==
- “Blindsided” (Daredevil), the fourth episode of the third season of the American television series Daredevil
- “Blindsided” (Modern Family), the third episode of the eighth season of the American sitcom Modern Family
- Blindsided, alternate title of the 2013 film Penthouse North
- Blindsided, a 2017 film directed by Louis Mandylor

== Music ==
- Blindsided (album), by Axium
- Blindsided, album by Blindside Blues Band
- "Blindsided", song by Lucy Woodward
- "Blindsided", a song by Bon Iver from For Emma, Forever Ago

== Other ==
- Blindsided, novel by Fern Michaels
- Blindsided, a non-fiction book by Jim Ferraro
