= List of Yes concert tours =

The list of Yes concert tours is divided into four articles chronologically:

- List of Yes concert tours (1960s–70s)
- List of Yes concert tours (1980s–90s)
- List of Yes concert tours (2000s–10s)
- List of Yes concert tours (2020s)
