= Igor Khoroshev =

Igor Khoroshev Игорь Хорошев
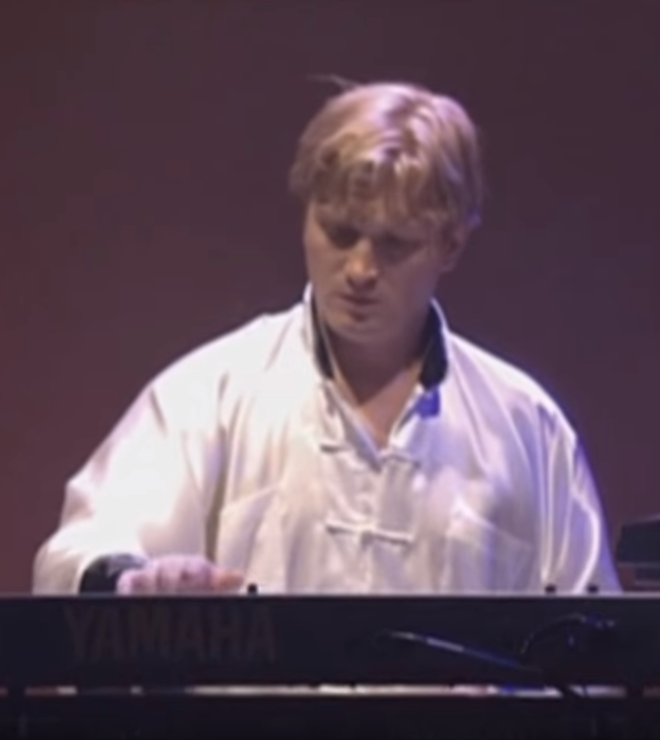
- Khoroshev on stage with Yes in 1999

Background information
- Born: Igor Petrovich Khoroshev; 14 July 1965 (age 60); Moscow, Russian SFSR, Soviet Union
- Genres: Progressive rock
- Occupations: Musician; composer; producer
- Instrument: Keyboards
- Years active: 1983–present
- Formerly of: Yes

Igor Petrovich Khoroshev (Russian: Игорь Петрович Хорошев; born 14 July 1965) is a Russian keyboardist, composer, and producer best known for being a member of English progressive rock band Yes from 1997 to 2000.

== Biography ==
Khoroshev was born on 14 July 1965 in Moscow, Russia. He started piano lessons at age five but took an interest in rock music as he grew older, and had his parents buy him albums by Yes, Genesis and King Crimson on the black market. Khoroshev recalled listening to Yes's Relayer (1974) and considered keyboardist Patrick Moraz as a musical hero. Khoroshev was also interested in classical music, and graduated from university with a major in composition and orchestration. When Khoroshev was 26, he relocated from Russia to the United States, initially to New York City before he settled in Boston, Massachusetts. He became active in the music scene there, working with various musicians including Benjamin Orr of The Cars.

While in Boston, Khoroshev also landed work composing music for computer software companies, including Cakewalk, whose owner, Carl Jacobson, introduced Khoroshev to Yes frontman Jon Anderson. When Yes keyboardist Rick Wakeman left the band in 1997, Anderson invited Khoroshev to an audition after listening to his demo tape. After a shaky initial audition, Khoroshev was successful on his second attempt, after he was given extra time to learn his parts. Khoroshev joined the band as a side musician, playing keyboards on their 1997–1998 world tour promoting Open Your Eyes (1997). The tour also featured newcomer Billy Sherwood, performing additional guitars and vocals. By 1999, Khoroshev had become a full-time member of Yes and played on their follow-up album, The Ladder (1999), and its tour from 1999 to 2000.

"To say that Igor Khoroshev was a bit of a wild card would be an understatement", Yes guitarist Steve Howe wrote in his 2020 memoir, All My Yesterdays, of Khoroshev's tenure with the band. "He thought he had the gift of gab and his artistic temperament reached superstar level, but he could certainly play the keys."

In 1999, Khoroshev released his only solo album to date, Piano Works. In March 2000, he and Anderson worked on an album called True You, True Me and aimed to release it in November of that year, with a tour as a duet in early 2001, but neither came into fruition.

After touring The Ladder, the band completed their Masterworks Tour in 2000. During the tour, Khoroshev was accused of assaulting two female security officers at a show near Washington, D.C. He was charged with two misdemeanours, assault and battery and sexual battery, and was freed with a $1,000 unsecured bond. The matter was settled out of court and Khoroshev was never convicted.

Since leaving Yes, Khoroshev has worked on film soundtracks, including Good Night Valentino and The Pearl, and in a production role, often working with Mike Plotnikoff (e.g. With Shivering Hearts We Wait, 2011).

== Discography ==
With Yes:

- Open Your Eyes (1997, as a session player on three tracks)
- The Ladder (1999)
- House of Yes: Live from House of Blues (2000)

Solo:

- Piano Works (1999)

Appearances:

- Encores, Legends, and Paradox, A Tribute to the Music of ELP (1999)
- Charlie Farren – Deja Blue... The Color of Love (1999)
- Farrenheit/Charlie Farren – Greasetown: Farrenheit III (1999)
- Like a Storm – The End of the Beginning (2009)
- Blindside – With Shivering Hearts We Wait (2011)
- Checkpoint Charlie – Love Karma – (2014, co-produced)
- True Violet – True Violet (2015, co-produced, co-mixed)
- The Agonist – Five (2016, string arrangements, mixing)
- Starset – Vessels (2017, strings, orchestral arrangements, programming)
- All That Remains – Madness (2017, string arrangement for track "Back to You")
- Red – Gone (2017, string arrangements, programming)
- Starset – Divisions (2019, additional programming)
- Fear Factory – Aggression Continuum (2021, keyboards)
