= Tom Colclough =

Canadian musician

Tom Colclough (March 3, 1961 - February 26, 2024) was a musician from Vancouver. He played jazz, pop and blues.

== Career ==
Colclough was a two-time West Coast Music Award winner. He has accompanied many musicians and singers, including Kenny Loggins, Celine Dion, David Foster, Julio Iglesias, Shania Twain, Aerosmith, Roch Voisine, and Jim Byrnes.

In May 2010 Tom received acclaim for his rock and roll sax solos in the Vancouver version of "Buddy: The Buddy Holly Story." Vancouverplays.com offered "a special shout-out to Tom Colclough for his screaming sax solos that evoke a time in early rock ‘n’ roll history when the saxophone, not the guitar, ruled the instrumental breaks." And the Vancouver Sun newspaper added "Musical director Sasha Niechoda is on keys, leading hot work by Henry Christian on trumpet, Neil Nicholson on trombone and especially Tom Colclough on sax."

Although he did not win, Tom was one of the nominees for Jazz Clarinetist of the Year for the Eighth Annual Canadian National Jazz Awards in 2009.

In 2004, Tom released a smooth jazz album of saxophone and clarinet compositions, "Heading Home", under his own label.

Tom received rave reviews across North America for his Artie Shaw-like performances as the featured clarinetist in the 1999 touring musical, Forever Swing. One of those reviews can be seen on Montreal.com. The official Forever Swing CD includes a long clarinet solo by Tom on Sing Sing Sing. A fan on the Clarinet BBoard, favourably compares Tom's performance on that song with the original by Benny Goodman.
