= Eagle Records =

British record label

- Parent company: Eagle Rock Entertainment (Universal Music Group)
- Genre: Rock
- Country of origin: United Kingdom

Eagle Records is a British record label, a division of Eagle Rock Entertainment, itself a subsidiary of Universal Music Group.

In the United Kingdom, the label's managing director is Lindsay Brown, former manager of Van Halen, while in the United States the head is Mike Carden, formerly of CMC International Records.

== Artists ==
- Gary Moore
- Asia
- Deep Purple
- Willy DeVille
- Emerson, Lake & Palmer
- Heart [in the UK]
- John Lee Hooker
- John Mayall
- Jethro Tull
- Magpie Salute
- Michael Nesmith
- Nazareth
- Ted Nugent
- Toto
- Thunder
- Hank Van Sickle
- PMC
- Yes
- Hard Rain
- The Rolling Stones
- Queen
- The Who
- Peter Forbes
- Slash

== Former artists ==
- Alice Cooper
- Candy Dulfer
- The Fall
- Bob Geldof
- Gary Glitter
- Hall & Oates
- Jeff Healey
- Nik Kershaw
- The Levellers
- Robert Palmer
- Pingy
- The Pretenders
- Simple Minds
- Styx
- Status Quo
- Uriah Heep
- Barry White
- Gary Numan
- Roland Orzabal
- Vixen
