= Dean (surname) =

Dean is an English surname; a variant of this surname is Deane.

It may refer to:

== People ==
- Angela Dean, 20th-21st century British statistician
- Anthony Dean (cyclist) (born 1991), Australian Olympic BMX racer
- Ardie Dean (born 1955), American blues drummer, audio engineer and record producer
- Austin Dean (born 1993), American baseball player
- Bashford Dean (1867–1928), American zoologist and expert in medieval and modern armor
- Bernadette Louise Dean, 20th-21st century Pakistani academic and educator
- Billy Dean (born 1962), American country music singer and songwriter
- Brenda Dean (1943–2018), British trade unionist and politician
- Brett Dean (born 1961), Australian composer
- Charlbi Dean (1990–2022), South African actress and model
- Charles Dean (died 1974), brother of Howard and Jim
- Charmaine Dean (born 1958), statistician from Trinidad, president of the Statistical Society of Canada
- Christopher Dean (born 1958), British ice dancer
- Collin Dean (born 2005), American former child actor
- Diana Dean (born 1942), Canadian artist
- Dixie Dean (1907–1980), English footballer
- Dizzy Dean (1910–1974), baseball pitcher
- Dora Dean (c. 1872–1949), vaudeville dancer
- Eddie Dean (singer) (1907–1999), American western singer and actor
- Elton Dean (1945–2006), English jazz musician
- Ester Dean (born 1986), American singer-songwriter
- Everett Dean (1898–1993), American college sports coach
- Fred Dean (1952–2020), American football player
- Gordon Dean (disambiguation)
- Henry Clay Dean (1822–1887), American orator, lawyer and author
- Howard Dean (born 1948), American politician and doctor
- Jackson Dean (born 2000), American country music singer and songwriter
- Jamel Dean (born 1996), American football player
- James Dean (disambiguation)
- Janet Dean Fodor (1942–2023), American professor of linguistics
- Jim Dean (activist), American political activist, chair of Democracy for America, the largest American political action committee
- Jimmy Dean (1928–2010), American singer and actor
- Joe Dean (1930–2013), American basketball player, sportscaster and sports administrator
- John Dean (disambiguation)
- Jono Dean (born 1984), Australian cricketer
- Julia Dean (disambiguation)
- Justin Dean (born 1996), American baseball player
- Kasseem Dean (born 1978), American record producer, rapper, DJ, and songwriter
- Kevin Dean (disambiguation)
- Letitia Dean (born 1967), English actress and singer
- Madeleine Dean, American politician
- Margia Dean, (1922–2023), American actress
- Mark Dean (disambiguation)
- Matt Dean (born 1966), American politician
- Michael Dean (cricketer) (born 1972), English cricketer
- Mike Dean (disambiguation)
- Millvina Dean (1912–2009), British civil servant, last living survivor of the Titanic disaster
- Miriam Dean, New Zealand Queen's Counsel
- Nakobe Dean (born 2000), American football player
- Nathan Dean (1934–2013), American businessman and politician
- Nathaniel Dean, Australian actor
- Nathaniel W. Dean (1817–1880), American politician
- Nelson Dean, American baseball player
- Nik Dean, American politician
- Norman Dean, footballer
- Oliver Dean (1783–1871), American physician and businessman, founder of Dean College
- Olivia Dean (born 1999), English singer
- Olivia Dean (archer) (born 2007), American archer
- Paul Dean (disambiguation)
- Peter Dean (disambiguation)
- Philip Dean (born 1954), Australian playwright
- Ralph Dean (1913–1987), Canadian Anglican cleric
- Ralph A. Dean, American phytopathologist
- Robert Dean (disambiguation)
- Roger Dean (disambiguation)
- Ron Dean (1938–2025), American actor
- Ruth Dean (1902–2003), American scholar of Anglo-Norman literature
- Theodosia Ann Dean (1819–1843), English missionary
- Thomas Dean (disambiguation), also Tom
- Tommy Dean (born 1945), American Major League Baseball player
- Tony Dean (disambiguation)
- Trey Dean (born 2000), American football player
- William Dean (disambiguation)
- Winton Dean (1916–2013), English musicologist
- Zach Dean, 21st century American screenwriter and film producer
- Zach Dean (ice hockey) (born 2003), Canadian ice hockey player
- Dean (Middlesex cricketer) (fl. 1787–1790), English amateur cricketer

== Fictional characters ==
- Eddie Dean (The Dark Tower), in Stephen King's The Dark Tower series of novels
- Johnno Dean, in the British soap opera Hollyoaks

== See also ==
- General Dean (disambiguation)
- Justice Dean (disambiguation)
- Senator Dean (disambiguation)
- Dean (given name)
- Deane (surname), includes a list of people with surname Deane
- Deen (disambiguation), includes a list of people with surname Deen
