= Cinema (Yes song) =

Instrumental by Yes

from the album 90125
- Released: 7 November 1983
- Recorded: 1983
- Studio: AIR (London, UK)
- Genre: Instrumental rock
- Length: 2:08
- Label: Atco
- Songwriters: Trevor Rabin, Chris Squire, Alan White, Tony Kaye
- Producer: Trevor Horn

"Cinema" is an instrumental by the progressive rock band Yes, from their 1983 album, 90125. In 1985 it won the Grammy Award for Best Rock Instrumental Performance, the band's only Grammy.

== History ==
The 1980 incarnation of Yes included Trevor Horn, Geoff Downes, Steve Howe, Chris Squire and Alan White. When this group split up following the tour for the album Drama, Squire and White joined forces with singer and guitarist Trevor Rabin. The three were eventually joined by former Yes member Tony Kaye, and the four began writing and recording demos under the band name "Cinema".

Chris Squire played some of the band Cinema's recordings with former Yes lead singer Jon Anderson, who expressed interest in participating in the project. With four out of the five having been Yes members, it was decided to change the name of the band from Cinema to Yes. The title of the instrumental track "Cinema" is therefore an acknowledgement of the four-piece band that co-wrote and performed it, before Anderson joined and the band was renamed Yes.

"Cinema" developed from a twenty-minute-long track with the working title "Time". At just over two minutes in length, "Cinema" is the shortest track on 90125. "Cinema" is one of two songs on 90125 (the other being "Leave It") that does not list Anderson as a co-writer in the liner notes, though according to BMI records (see BMI work #215023) "Cinema" is officially credited as written by all five members of Yes, including Anderson.

== Live performances ==
In the 9012Live concert video, "Cinema" was the first song played, preceding "Leave It" as it does on 90125.

In later years, Yes would follow "Cinema" with "Owner of a Lonely Heart" instead, as seen in the House of Yes: Live from House of Blues video concert. In 2004, current and former Yes members Squire, White, Rabin, Howe, and Downes united to perform "Cinema" and "Owner of a Lonely Heart" at the Prince's Trust concert honouring Trevor Horn.
