= Thomas Deane (disambiguation) =

Sir Thomas Deane was an Irish architect.

Thomas Deane may also refer to:

- Sir Thomas Newenham Deane (1828–1899), Irish architect, the son of Sir Thomas Deane
- Sir Thomas Manly Deane (1851–1933), Irish architect, the son of Sir Thomas Newenham Deane
- Thomas Deane (priest) (1645–1713), Anglican priest in Ireland

== See also ==
- Thomas Dean (disambiguation)
- Tommy Deans (1922–2000), Scottish footballer
