= Arthur Dean =

Arthur Dean may refer to:

- Arthur Dean (Australian politician) (1942–2023), Australian Liberal politician
- Arthur Dean (British politician) (1857–1929), British Conservative Party politician, MP 1924–1929
- Arthur Dean (cricketer) (born 1931), Australian cricketer
- Arthur Dean (judge) (1893–1970), Australian judge
- Arthur Dean (lawyer) (1898–1987), American corporate lawyer and advisor to numerous U.S. presidents
- Paul Dean, Baron Dean of Harptree (Arthur Paul Dean, 1924–2009), British Conservative Party politician

== See also ==
- Arthur Deane Nesbitt (1910–1978), Canadian businessman
- Dean (surname)
