= Classic Yes =

1981 compilation album by Yes

Greatest hits album by Yes
- Released: 11 December 1981
- Recorded: 1970–1977
- Genres: Progressive rock; art rock
- Length: 64:49
- Label: Atlantic
- Producers: Yes; Eddie Offord
- Compiler: Chris Squire

Yes chronology
Yesshows (1980)	Classic Yes (1981)	90125 (1983)

Professional ratings
Review scores
Source	Rating
AllMusic	4.5/5 stars

Classic Yes is the second compilation album by the English progressive rock band Yes, released on 11 December 1981 by Atlantic Records. It was released after the group had disbanded in early 1981, following their 1980 tour in support of their tenth studio album, Drama (1980). The tracks were compiled by bassist Chris Squire and the cover was designed by Roger Dean.

Upon its release, it charted at No. 142 on the US Billboard 200. Some pressings included a free single of previously unreleased live versions of "Roundabout" and "I've Seen All Good People". The album became a strong seller, and was certified platinum by the Recording Industry Association of America (RIAA) for selling over one million copies.

== Track listing ==
Side one
No.	Title	Writer(s)	Original album	Length
1.	"Heart of the Sunrise"	Jon Anderson, Chris Squire, Bill Bruford	Fragile (1971)	10:34
2.	"Wonderous Stories"	Anderson	Going for the One (1977)	3:45
3.	"Yours Is No Disgrace"	Anderson, Squire, Bruford, Steve Howe, Tony Kaye	The Yes Album (1971)	9:41

Side two
No.	Title	Writer(s)	Original album	Length
4.	"Starship Trooper""	Anderson, Squire, Howe	The Yes Album	9:29
5.	"Long Distance Runaround"	Anderson	Fragile	3:30
6.	"The Fish"	Squire	Fragile	2:36
7.	"And You and I""	Anderson, Bruford, Howe, Squire	Close to the Edge (1972)	10:03

Bonus single, side one
No.	Title	Writer(s)	Length
8.	"Roundabout" (Live at Oakland Coliseum, 7 October 1978)	Anderson, Howe	7:47

Bonus single, side two
No.	Title	Writer(s)	Length
9.	"I've Seen All Good People" (Live at Empire Pool, 28 October 1978)	Anderson, Squire	7:24

== Personnel ==
Yes

- Jon Anderson – lead vocals
- Steve Howe – guitars, vocals
- Chris Squire – bass guitar, vocals
- Tony Kaye – keyboards on "Yours Is No Disgrace" and "Starship Trooper"
- Rick Wakeman – keyboards on everything else
- Alan White – drums on "Wonderous Stories", "Roundabout", and "I've Seen All Good People"
- Bill Bruford – drums on everything else

Production

- Chris Squire – album compilation
- Yes – production
- Eddie Offord – production, engineer

== Charts ==
Chart (1981)	Peak position
US Billboard 200	142

== Certifications ==
Region	Certification	Certified units/sales
United Kingdom (BPI)	Silver	60,000^{^}
United States (RIAA)	Platinum	1,000,000^{^}
^{^} Shipments figures based on certification alone.
