= Peter Dean =

Peter Dean may refer to:

- Peter Dean (artist), British artist and designer
- Peter Dean (actor) (born 1939), British actor, most notable for his role in the BBC soap opera EastEnders
- Peter Dean (footballer) (born 1965), former Australian rules footballer
- Peter Dean (sailor) (born 1951), American former sailor and Olympic silver medalist
- Peter J. Dean (born 1946), founder and president of Leaders By Design
- Peter B. Dean (born 1945), US–Finnish professor of radiology
- Peter Dean, American actor who hosted several episodes of Forensic Files
