= Michael Dean =

Michael Dean or Mike Dean may refer to:

- Michael Dean (artist) (born 1977), British artist
- Michael Dean (broadcaster) (1933–2015), New Zealand-born television presenter, active also in the UK and Australia
- Michael Dean (cricketer) (born 1972), English cricketer
- Michael Lee Dean, American clarinetist and university professor
- Michael Dean, American journalist, editor-in-chief of The Comics Journal for Fantagraphics Books
- Mike Dean (bassist) (born 1963), American bassist with Corrosion of Conformity
- Mike Dean (music producer) (born 1965), American hip hop producer
- Mike Dean (politician) (born 1955), American politician
- Mike Dean (referee) (born 1968), English VAR referee and former referee in the Premier League
- Mike Dean, original drummer for Gang Green
- Michael Dean (born 1978), English footballer, see List of AFC Bournemouth players (25–99 appearances)

== See also ==
- Michael Deane (disambiguation)
- Mickey Deans (1934–2003), American discothèque manager and husband of Judy Garland
- "Michel Dean", the individually named gap between the two easternmost Seven Sisters cliffs in Sussex
