= Yesshows =

1980 live album by Yes

Live album by Yes
- Released: 24 November 1980
- Recorded: 1976–1978 at various locations in the US and Europe
- Genre: Progressive rock
- Length: 79:16
- Label: Atlantic
- Producer: Chris Squire

Yes chronology
Drama (1980)	Yesshows (1980)	Classic Yes (1981)

Yesshows is the second live album by the English progressive rock band Yes. It was released in the US on 24 November 1980 and in the UK on 19 December 1980 by Atlantic Records as the final album before the group disbanded in early 1981. Their first live album in seven years, it is compiled of recordings from their 1976, 1977, and 1978 tours from dates in North America and Europe with its mixing supervised by bassist Chris Squire.

Yesshows was remastered and expanded in 2009 by Isao Kikuchi, and published by Warner Music Japan as part of their "Yes SHM-CD Papersleeve" series.

== Background and production ==
In June 1979, the Yes line-up of singer Jon Anderson, bassist Chris Squire, guitarist Steve Howe, keyboardist Rick Wakeman, and drummer Alan White, finished their 1978–1979 tour in support of the band's ninth studio album, Tormato (1978). Their label Atlantic Records had approached the group about the possibility of putting out a live album as a follow-up to their first, Yessongs (1973), and Squire had the task of sifting through hours of tapes of concerts recorded since then and selecting the best cuts. He also undertook mixing duties, and prepared a selection of tracks from the 1976, 1977, and 1978 tours across five dates from his studio, Sun Park Studios.

The band commissioned longtime cover artist Roger Dean to produce artwork for the album, which was completed using acrylic paints and collage. A release date of Christmas 1979 was set, but it was shelved following disagreements from other band members regarding Squire's choice of performances and the quality of his mixes. Howe was glad that production had halted and "strongly objected" to some of the production edits that Squire had done. He expressed the rest of the band's wish to refine the recordings further and to add more tracks to expand the set from a double to a triple album.

By mid-1980, Yes had a change in personnel following the departures of Anderson and Wakeman, and the remaining members recruited Trevor Horn and Geoff Downes of The Buggles as replacements on vocals and keyboards, respectively. The five recorded Drama (1980), and toured the album from August to December 1980. Towards the end of that year, Atlantic Records wished to release a live album and used the cuts and mixes that Squire had prepared as the final release. Mastering was completed at Strawberry Mastering.

== Songs ==
Yesshows comprises seven songs taken from five concerts. "The Gates of Delirium" and "Ritual" are from 17 August 1976 at Cobo Arena in Detroit, Michigan, during the band's 1976 North American tour which featured Patrick Moraz on Keyboards. "Parallels", "Going for the One", and "Wonderous Stories" were recorded on 24 November 1977 at Ahoy-Hal in Rotterdam during the 1977 tour in support of Going for the One (1977). "Time and a Word" and "Don't Kill the Whale" are from the Wembley Arena in London from the Tormato tour. The latter was recorded by the BBC using the Manor Mobile studio for a live radio broadcast of the 28 October 1978 concert. Two live recordings of "Roundabout" and "I've Seen All Good People" (taken during the 1978 shows) were originally released as a bonus extended play on the 1981 compilation album Classic Yes, but were subsequently added as bonus tracks on the 2009 reissue of this album.

== Release ==
Yesshows was released in the US on 24 November 1980, and peaked at No. 43 on the Billboard 200 on 31 January 1981, during a 12-week stay on the chart. Released in the UK in December, It entered the UK Albums Chart on 10 January 1981 at No. 29. In its third week, it reached its peak at No. 22, and remained on the chart for five more weeks.

== Reception ==
Professional ratings
Review scores
Source	Rating
AllMusic	3.5/5 stars
The Rolling Stone Album Guide	2/5 stars

Band opinion of this second live album by Yes was divided, at least up to the 1990s. As reported by author David Watkinson, the label did not inform everyone of events. Wakeman, who was not in the group at the time of release, said that Squire's mixes were "good but nothing exciting. The next thing I know was that somebody gave me a copy". While he, Anderson, and Howe did not care for the final release, White, Squire, and the keyboardist Patrick Moraz gave it more approval.

Writing for Sounds magazine in late 1980, John Gill recommended, "For Delirium and Ritual alone, I'd buy it". The UCLA Daily Bruin stated, "The inclusion of 'Gates of Delirium' and 'Ritual' are enough to justify the existence of Yesshows", but that with Anderson and Wakeman exiting the group (and the Buggles merging in), an opportunity was missed to include old high-rated classics. It called the inclusion of "Don't Kill the Whale" a "worthy message, but not a particularly good Yes song".

== Reissues ==
Year	Label	Format	Notes
1989	Atlantic	2xCD	Japanese release
1994	Atlantic	2xCD	Digital remaster with a 12-page booklet.
2009	Warner Music Japan	2xCD	Digital remaster by Isao Kikuchi.

== Track listing ==
Side one
No.	Title	Writer(s)	Recording date and location	Length
1.	"Parallels"	Chris Squire	24 November 1977 at Ahoy-Hal, Rotterdam	7:07
2.	"Time and a Word"	Jon Anderson, David Foster	27 October 1978 at Empire Pool, London	4:06
3.	"Going for the One"	Anderson	18 November 1977 at Festhalle, Frankfurt	5:18

Side two
No.	Title	Writer(s)	Recording date and location	Length
1.	"The Gates of Delirium"	Anderson, Squire, Steve Howe, Alan White, Patrick Moraz	17 August 1976 at Cobo Arena, Detroit	22:40

Side three
No.	Title	Writer(s)	Recording date and location	Length
1.	"Don't Kill the Whale"	Anderson, Squire	28 October 1978 at Empire Pool, London	4:12
2.	"Ritual (Part 1)"	Anderson, Squire, Howe, Rick Wakeman, White	17 August 1976	14:53

Side four
No.	Title	Writer(s)	Recording date and location	Length
1.	"Ritual (Part 2)"	Anderson, Squire, Howe, Wakeman, White	17 August 1976	17:06
2.	"Wonderous Stories"	Anderson	24 November 1977	3:54

- The 1994 remaster combines both parts of "Ritual", removing the fade-out at the end of Part 1.

2009 CD bonus tracks
No.	Title	Writer(s)	Recording date and location	Length
1.	"I've Seen All Good People a. Your Move b. All Good People"	Anderson, Squire	28 October 1978 at Empire Pool, Wembley, London, UK	7:29
2.	"Roundabout"	Anderson, Howe	7 October 1978 at Oakland Coliseum, Oakland, California	7:53

== Personnel ==
Credits are taken from the 1980 and 1994 liner notes.

Yes

- Jon Anderson – lead vocals, guitar, keyboards on "Don't Kill the Whale"
- Steve Howe – electric and acoustic guitars, backing vocals
- Chris Squire – bass guitar, backing vocals, percussion on "Ritual"
- Patrick Moraz – keyboards on "The Gates of Delirium" and "Ritual"
- Rick Wakeman – keyboards on all other tracks
- Alan White – drums, percussion

Production

- Chris Squire – production, mixing
- Mike Dunne – live recording
- Nigel Luby – live recording engineer
- Geoff Young – engineer
- Sean Davis – engineer on "Time and a Word"
- Barry Ainsworth – engineer on "Time and a Word"
- Tony Wilson – production on "Don't Kill the Whale"
- Bill Aitken – engineer on "Don't Kill the Whale"
- Neil Burn – engineer on "Don't Kill the Whale"
- Roger Dean – cover painting
- Magnetic Storm Ltd. – cover design
- Sean Davis – lacquer cut
- Lisa Tanner – photography

== Charts ==
Chart (1981)	Peak position
Norwegian Albums (VG-lista)	32
UK Albums (Official Charts)	22
US Billboard 200	43

== Certifications ==
Region	Certification	Certified units/sales
United Kingdom (BPI)	Silver	60,000^{^}
^{^} Shipments figures based on certification alone.
