= Dean Thomas =

Dean Thomas may refer to:

- Dean Thomas (footballer) (born 1961), former manager of Hinckley United
- Dean Thomas (motorcycle racer) (born 1973), motorcycle racer from Australia
- Dean Thomas (rugby league) (born 1966), an English rugby league coach and former player
- Dean Thomas (Harry Potter), character from the Harry Potter series

== See also ==
- Thomas Dean (disambiguation)
