= Owner of a Lonely Heart =

1983 single by Yes

Single by Yes

from the album 90125
- B-side: "Our Song"
- Released: 24 October 1983
- Recorded: 1983
- Genre: Electronic rock; dance-rock; progressive pop; new wave
- Length: 4:27 (album version); 3:50 (single version); 7:05 (extended remix)
- Label: Atco
- Songwriters: Trevor Rabin; Jon Anderson; Chris Squire; Trevor Horn
- Producer: Trevor Horn

Yes singles chronology
| "Into the Lens" (1980) | "Owner of a Lonely Heart" (1983) | "Leave It" (1984) |

Audio sample
- "Owner of a Lonely Heart": file; help

Music video
- "Owner of a Lonely Heart" on YouTube

"Owner of a Lonely Heart" is a song by British progressive rock band Yes. It is the first track and single from their eleventh studio album 90125 (1983), and was released on 24 October 1983. Written primarily by guitarist and singer Trevor Rabin, contributions were made to the final version by singer Jon Anderson, bassist Chris Squire, and producer Trevor Horn.

The song was a commercial success in the United States, becoming the band's only single to reach No. 1 on the Billboard Hot 100 and Hot Mainstream Rock Tracks charts. In 1984, the song was ranked No. 8 on the U.S. year-end chart. The single was reissued several times throughout the 1980s and 1990s with various remix versions and B-sides.

== Development ==
=== Origins and demo version ===
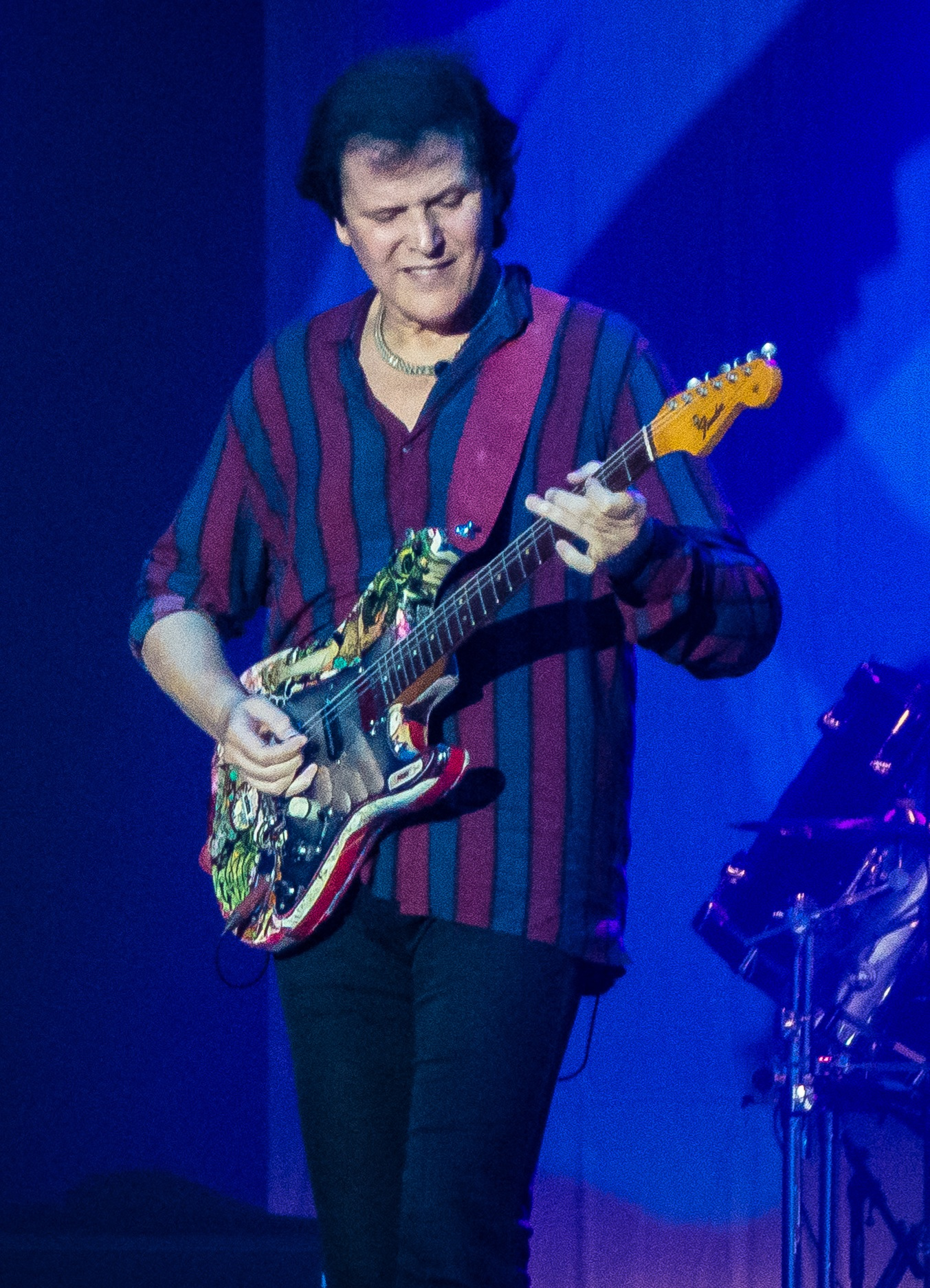
The song was originally written by Trevor Rabin

The song originated in 1979 from South African musician, singer-songwriter, and producer Trevor Rabin; while going to the toilet, he wrote "the whole thing, from beginning to end". Rabin then put down his ideas onto tape using his home equipment which included a 4-track tape machine. One of the recordings consisted of the main verse and chorus riff played on an acoustic guitar with some vocals. A developed version with drums, keyboards, and a complete set of lyrics was completed in 1980. Both recordings were released on Rabin's demo compilation album 90124, in 2003. For the full version, Rabin used the first and second tracks to record the instruments and vocals before mixing the song onto the third. He added: "You would be making decisions based on what was coming, and sometimes those decisions would be wrong – but you couldn't undo them. One of the things, a happy accident, was that all of the brass stabs and those weird things that happen on the record – they were just a product of what happened with the demo".

After relocating to Los Angeles in 1981, Rabin added the song to his collection of demos that he wished to develop for a fourth solo album. Among the record labels that Rabin pitched his work to was Arista Records, but he recalled owner Clive Davis rejecting them on the basis of the songs sounding "too strange, and would not be a hit", and suggesting that Rabin "write stuff more like Foreigner and then come back. I never did". Rabin then landed a development deal with Geffen Records who introduced Rabin to musicians with the intention of forming Asia, but Rabin declined due to the lack of chemistry and his preference for making a solo album.

Rabin's deal with Geffen ended in 1982, but an offer from A&R man Ron Fair of RCA Records was the first time Rabin's songs were recognised as potential hits. Rabin said Fair called "Owner of a Lonely Heart" "a game changer" and offered him an album deal on the strength of it. However, Rabin turned it down when he agreed to form a new band with bassist Chris Squire and drummer Alan White of the progressive rock band Yes and make an album, initially under the name Cinema, for Atco Records. Much of the new material derived from Rabin's demos, including "Hold On" and "Changes", and displayed a more pop-oriented approach than what Yes had been known for. The group worked with former Yes singer Trevor Horn as their producer.

=== Development and production ===
By January 1983, most of the backing tracks and vocals for the Cinema album had been recorded, but an additional song was needed. While Rabin was on a toilet break, Horn left his demo tape running and heard his version of "Owner of a Lonely Heart". He disliked Rabin's inclinations toward "American rock" in his songs and its verse lyrics, which he remembered as: "You don't wanna go dancing, you won't even answer the phone. You so scared of romancing, everything you do is alone". However, he recognised the "powerful" introduction with its "snap jump cut" into the main riff, plus its strong chorus hook, as a hit single. "The verses of it were so awful that I was convinced that if we didn't put loads of whizzbangs and gags all over the verse that no one would ever listen to it".

Horn recalled pleading with the band to record it on the grounds that they needed a hit single, despite the group's reluctance. Subsequent musical and lyrical changes were then made by Horn and Squire, and for several days the group attempted to perform it. Horn was dissatisfied with the addition of various drum fills and superfluous sections, and suggested they record it "straight and simple" without changing the original riff. Rabin agreed to change his song this way, but wanted to keep the sound levels "very loud" which Horn "was totally into". It took Horn approximately seven months to convince Rabin to rewrite the lyrics. Once Rabin agreed, several versions were produced which included Horn's contribution of the verses including: "Move yourself, you always live your life...", which earned him 15% of the song credit.

For the song's opening, Rabin used the same guitar tone that he had employed on a session he did for Manfred Mann's Earth Band, which involved panning two guitar tracks left and right and aiming for a sound "as heavy as possible". The arpeggiated guitar part on the verses, according to Horn, was played on a 12-string Rickenbacker, though this has been disputed. Chris Squire's bass guitar parts were played on his custom-built Electra MPC Outlaw - making use of two of its plug-in features (the octave box and the phaser) - run through a 100-watt Marshall amplifier:

"I used the MPC with the built-in octave drop, which gives you a sub bass frequency. That's how I was able to get that heavy whoop, relating back to the Motown type of bass sound. But it also has a Fender Telecaster guitar playing the bass line along with it mixed in very subtly. That's a technique we used on Roundabout. Steve Howe played one of those old Gibson cellotype acoustic six-strings with me, but up an octave.

Originally, Trevor [Rabin] wasn't going to play Owner for us because he didn't consider it to be right for the group. But it had a certain English quality about it that I liked, and I think it's a very good indication of the way we now approach music."

Squire also added a Motown-influenced bridge section to the song, following the second chorus.

After the band had produced a satisfactory arrangement, Horn wished to incorporate a drum programmer, which the band, particularly White, strongly objected to at first. Horn prevailed, resulting in Squire and himself programming a drum machine sequence for the song. Rabin tried numerous times to persuade Horn and engineer Gary Langan to retain the heavy drum sound that he had used on the song's demo, but they wanted it changed as it did not suit White's sound or drumming style. Horn wanted to use a drum sound similar to that of Stewart Copeland on Synchronicity (1983) by the Police, and tuned White's snare drum to the key of a high A. Atlantic president Ahmet Ertegun liked a mix that Horn had made, and decreed that Rabin's idea for a big drum sound would not be used. Horn also used a five-second sample of the drum breakdown in "Kool is Back" by jazz and soul group Funk, Inc. (itself a cover of "Kool's Back Again" by Kool & the Gang): Alan White incorporated this into the song's midsection drum break, which he played on Fairlight.

At Horn's suggestion, Rabin used the Synclavier synthesiser and sampler to replace his original keyboard parts. On the demo version, the breaks and flourishes had been played on a Minimoog synthesiser: Horn wished to keep them in the final song and had them rerecorded on his Fairlight CMI sampler, as well as reworking some of them using Synclavier and Fairlight patches and noises. For the "whizzbangs and gags" sound effects, Horn used the Fairlight (programmed by J. J. Jeczalik). According to musician Questlove, "Owner of a Lonely Heart" contained the first use of a sample as a breakbeat, as opposed to a sound effect.

In April 1983, former Yes singer Jon Anderson joined the group (which resulted in Cinema changing their name to Yes). Anderson recorded his vocals to the songs while changing some of the musical and lyrical content. Horn remembered Anderson disliking the song's new lyrics and his comment: "Well, it's not like 'Send in the Clowns' anyway". Consequently, Anderson rewrote Horn's lyrics for the second verse, including the line "Watch it now, the eagle in the sky". As a cheeky riposte, Horn and Langan added a gunshot sound effect immediately following that verse, thereby "shooting down" the eagle. Trevor Rabin has stated that Trevor Horn did not like some of Anderson's lyrics, and had Rabin redo the words sounding like Anderson; "If you go back and listen to it I'm sure you can find them."

The final song was credited to Rabin, Anderson, Squire and Horn. Rabin recently clarified his view on the breakdown of credit and royalties: "Jon did add to my lyrics in the verses and deserved what he got, as did Chris. One can hear my development of the song on 90124; sound doesn't lie. Trevor Horn being allotted a percentage was a thank you for introducing me to the Synclavier, which is one of the keyboards I used on the song and I had not used before. Also, for the fun we had making it".

Horn has rated "Owner of a Lonely Heart" as one of the best tracks of his career.

== Reception ==
Cash Box said that "Horn constructs an instrumental intro segment of discrete drumrolls, fuzz guitar phrases, and scratched-in brass and synth flourishes and then uses these and other elements to punctuate Jon Anderson’s fluid depiction of the title subject" and that the song "is built upon a steady dance beat, which brings [Yes] solidly into the ’80s." Andy Cush of Pitchfork called the song "one of the craziest-sounding records ever made".

== Music video ==
The song's music video was shown frequently on MTV, introducing the revamped Yes lineup and sound to a new generation of fans largely unfamiliar with the band's earlier progressive rock style. The music video was directed by graphic designer Storm Thorgerson who, as part of Hipgnosis, had previously designed the covers for the band's albums Going for the One and Tormato.

Keyboardist Tony Kaye does not appear in the video as at the time of the video shoot, Eddie Jobson was standing in as the band's keyboardist. Jobson can be seen briefly in a few quick shots in the beginning band scene and from behind during the rooftop scene, but he was not part of the video's "animal transformation" scene in which the other four band members take part; the video was edited to remove as much of his appearance as possible. Ultimately, Kaye returned to the lineup and Jobson never recorded any material with the band.

The video was filmed in London, with some scenes filmed on top of various buildings. Scenes of the band playing are also present. It features a high concept storyline involving a man arrested by implied to be secret police and taken in for interrogation. The protagonist was played by actor Danny Webb. He is plucked from the street and led steadily deeper into a building filled with other unfortunate victims. During his ordeal he experiences mental flashes of various animals. Eventually he arrives in the basement full of industrial machinery where he escapes after fighting an opponent. After climbing to freedom at the top of the tower he is confronted by several men (played by the band) and eventually leaps off the building, transforming to a bird of prey. The scene returns to him marching to work with thousands of others, revealing the scenes to be his imagination. He turns around and heads back the other direction.

== Legacy ==
The song has been covered by various artists, most notably Max Graham, whose 2005 single reached No. 9 in the UK. It has also been sampled numerous times, including in "Close (to the Edit)" by Trevor Horn's own Art of Noise. The song was featured in the Monster: The Ed Gein Story episode "The Godfather". It was also referenced in the Mystery Science Theater 3000 episode #1008 ("Final Justice"), in an intermission when Tom Servo compares a lonely heart to various other things, including a cheese slicer.

Questlove has cited the song as the first example of a drum beat sampled from a different record.

== Personnel ==
Personnel are sourced from the Sound on Sound YouTube channel and the Red Bull Music Academy.

Yes

- Jon Anderson – lead and backing vocals
- Trevor Rabin – co-lead and backing vocals, electric guitars, Synclavier and Fairlight CMI synthesizers
- Chris Squire – bass guitar, backing vocals
- Alan White – drums, Fairlight CMI programming
- Tony Kaye – electric piano

Production

- Trevor Horn – Fairlight CMI programming, production
- J. J. Jeczalik – Fairlight CMI programming

== Charts ==
=== Original version ===
==== Weekly charts ====
| Chart (1983–1984) | Peak position |
|---|---|
| Australia (Kent Music Report) | 14 |
| Austria (Ö3 Austria Top 40) | 17 |
| Belgium (Ultratop 50 Flanders) | 6 |
| Belgium (VRT Top 30 Flanders) | 6 |
| Bolivia (UPI) | 1 |
| Canada (CHUM) | 2 |
| Canada Top Singles (RPM) | 2 |
| Finland (Suomen virallinen lista) | 9 |
| Ireland (IRMA) | 30 |
| Italy (Musica e dischi) | 12 |
| Netherlands (Dutch Top 40) | 2 |
| Netherlands (Single Top 100) | 7 |
| New Zealand (Recorded Music NZ) | 16 |
| Norway (VG-lista) | 6 |
| South Africa (Springbok Radio) | 11 |
| Spain (AFYVE) | 8 |
| Sweden (Sverigetopplistan) | 4 |
| Switzerland (Schweizer Hitparade) | 11 |
| UK Singles (Official Charts) | 28 |
| Uruguay (UPI) | 4 |
| US Billboard Hot 100 | 1 |
| US Album Rock Tracks (Billboard) | 1 |
| US Dance/Disco Top 80 (Billboard) | 3 |
| US Hot Black Singles (Billboard) | 69 |
| US Cash Box Top 100 | 1 |
| West Germany (GfK) | 10 |

==== Year-end charts ====
| Chart (1983) | Position |
|---|---|
| Belgium (Ultratop 50 Flanders) | 89 |
| Netherlands (Dutch Top 40) | 55 |
| Netherlands (Single Top 100) | 80 |

| Chart (1984) | Position |
|---|---|
| Canada Top Singles (RPM) | 29 |
| US Billboard Hot 100 | 8 |
| US Cash Box Top 100 | 8 |
| West Germany (Media Control) | 57 |

=== Max Graham vs. Yes version ===
==== Weekly charts ====
| Chart (2005) | Peak position |
|---|---|
| Australia (ARIA) | 25 |
| Australian Dance (ARIA) | 4 |
| Austria (Ö3 Austria Top 40) | 56 |
| Belgium (Ultratop 50 Flanders) | 33 |
| Belgium (Ultratop 50 Wallonia) | 10 |
| Denmark (Tracklisten) | 12 |
| Finland (Suomen virallinen lista) | 10 |
| Germany (GfK) | 36 |
| Hungary (Rádiós Top 40) | 13 |
| Ireland (IRMA) | 17 |
| Netherlands (Dutch Top 40) | 18 |
| Netherlands (Single Top 100) | 25 |
| Scottish Singles Sales (Official Charts) | 6 |
| Sweden (Sverigetopplistan) | 60 |
| Switzerland (Schweizer Hitparade) | 49 |
| UK Singles (Official Charts) | 9 |

==== Year-end charts ====
| Chart (2005) | Position |
|---|---|
| Netherlands (Single Top 100) | 91 |
| UK Singles (OCC) | 110 |

== Certifications ==
| Region | Certification | Certified units/sales |
|---|---|---|
| New Zealand (RMNZ) | Platinum | 30,000^{‡} |
| United Kingdom (BPI) | Gold | 400,000^{‡} |
^{‡} Sales+streaming figures based on certification alone.

== See also ==
- List of number-one mainstream rock hits (United States)
- List of Billboard Hot 100 number ones of 1984
- List of Cash Box Top 100 number-one singles of 1984
