= Michael Deane =

Michael Deane may refer to:

- Michael Deane (chef) (born 1961), chef from Northern Ireland
- Michael Deane (journalist) (1951–2013), British journalist and cameraman
- Michael Deane (cricketer) (born 1977), English cricketer
- Mike Deane (born 1951), American college basketball coach

== See also ==
- Michael Dean (disambiguation)
