= Leave It =

Single by Yes

from the album 90125
- Released: February 1984 (US); 5 March 1984 (UK)
- Recorded: 1983
- Genre: New wave; funk; electronic rock
- Length: 4:14
- Label: Atco
- Songwriters: Trevor Rabin; Chris Squire; Trevor Horn
- Producer: Trevor Horn

Yes singles chronology
| "Owner of a Lonely Heart" (1983) | "Leave It" (1984) | "It Can Happen" (1984) |

Music video
- "Leave It" on YouTube

"Leave It" is a song by English rock band Yes. It appears on their 1983 album, 90125, and released as its second single, following "Owner of a Lonely Heart".

The song peaked at number 24 on the Billboard Hot 100 and number 3 on the Top Album Rock Tracks chart. In the UK, the song rose to number 56 in late March 1984, in a run of five weeks on the chart.

The song is the second track on the album's second side, with the instrumental song "Cinema" serving as a form of prelude.

== Release ==
The 12-inch single release (ATCO 0-96964) featured an extended "Hello, Goodbye" remix by Trevor Horn (9:30) as the A-side, with the B-side consisting of the 7-inch single remix (3:52) and the A Capella remix (3:19). The 7-inch single includes the two B-side tracks of the 12".

There were repeated single-issues, most backed with remixes of the song or an a cappella version. The original version was occasionally placed as the B-side of "Owner of a Lonely Heart", and on another instance, the original version was found on a 12-inch single with another A-side track, "City of Love". The song has the distinction of being the only track from 90125 virtually unaltered, in terms of writing, from the version recorded by Squire, Rabin, White and Kaye before Jon Anderson rejoined and, by the same token, one of only two tracks on the album whose credits do not include Anderson.

== Reception ==
"Leave It" has been described as the band's "funkiest" song, "riding out a nimble bass groove, ping-ponging choral vocals, and Graham Preskett's unexpected violin flourishes." Also notable, according to Stuart Chambers, are the use of sampled drum sounds, the "chorale effect’’, taken by Anderson, to a "higher plateau" and the importance of Horn’s production.

Cash Box described "Leave It" as having "a rather unnerving mixture of urgent, albeit contradictory, elements" and said that it starts with "a rich studio chorale intro" and has a "real tasty Vanilla Funk groove."

== Music video ==
The music video (directed by Godley and Creme) depicts the band members standing in a line and dressed in black business suits as their images go through video-created abstract effects. It was one of the first music videos to utilize computer-generated imagery. Eighteen different variations of the video were made (the first one, for instance, simply had the band upside-down, but motionless for the whole song, while the seventh one was just the first one but with only Jon Anderson), with the eleventh one chosen as the "standard" version, and has remained the "official" video. A half-hour documentary on the making of the video was broadcast on MTV in 1984. Also, a marathon showing all eighteen videos, one after the other, was also shown on MTV.

== Personnel ==
=== Yes ===
- Jon Anderson – co-lead vocals
- Chris Squire – bass guitar, backing vocals
- Trevor Rabin – co-lead vocals, electric and acoustic guitars, keyboards, backing vocals
- Alan White – drums, percussion, Fairlight CMI, backing vocals
- Tony Kaye – keyboards

=== Additional personnel ===
- Trevor Horn – backing vocals
- Graham Preskett – violin

=== Production ===
- Trevor Horn – producer
- J. J. Jeczalik – programming
- Dave Lawson – programming
- Gary Langan – engineer
- Steve Lipson – engineer
- Garry Mouat of Assorted Images – single packaging

== Charts ==
| Chart (1984) | Peak position |
|---|---|
| UK Singles (Official Charts) | 56 |
| US Billboard Hot 100 | 24 |
| US Mainstream Rock (Billboard) | 3 |

== Live performances ==
"Leave It" appeared in a similar manner on the 9012Live tour as it had on the album; it was the second song performed each night, with "Cinema" serving as the intro. The song was performed on all 113 shows of the 9012Live tour, but has never been performed by the band since.
