= Martin B. Dickman =

American plant pathologist (1950–2018)

Martin B. Dickman (16 February 1950 – 2 December 2018) was an American plant pathologist.

A Flushing, New York, native, Dickman was born on 16 February 1950, and received his bachelor's of science degree in horticulture from the University of Hawaii in 1979. He completed his studies with a master's of science and doctorate in plant pathology, both from UH. After a postdoctoral fellowship at the University of Washington, Dickman began teaching at the University of Nebraska–Lincoln in 1987, where he was named Charles Bessey Professor in Plant Pathology in 2003. He moved to Texas A&M University in 2006, accepting the Christine Richardson Professorship in agriculture. Between 2012 and 2017, Dickman served as editor-in-chief of the journal Molecular Plant Pathology . Dickman was appointed a Texas A&M University Distinguished Professor in 2015. The American Phytopathological Society honored Dickman with the 2017 Noel T. Keen Award for Research Excellence in Molecular Plant Pathology.

Over the course of his career, Dickman has been elected fellow of the American Phytopathological Society in 1993, and fellow of the American Association for the Advancement of Science in 2011, as well as fellow of the American Academy of Microbiology. He died on 2 December 2018, in Carpinteria, California.
