= Peter Dean (artist) =

British artist and designer

Peter Dean is a British artist and designer. His artistic work often takes inspiration from examples of Victorian letterpress printing. He is most notable for his recreation of the Victorian circus poster that was owned by John Lennon and inspired the Beatles song Being for the Benefit of Mr. Kite!. as well as creating the poster at the centre of Stephen Hawking’s famous time travel experiment. His work can be found in both the permanent collections of the Victoria and Albert Museum and the Science Museum, both in London, UK and has also been seen on The Late Show with Stephen Colbert.

In 2012, inspired by his affinities for both The Beatles and Victorian letterpress posters, he set about recreating the Victorian circus poster that inspired the Beatles’ song Being for the Benefit of Mr. Kite!. As part of this project, he commissioned wood engraver Andy English as well as letterpress printer Graham Bignell at New North Press in London. A short, independent film created by Nick Esdaile and Joe Fellows documented this project. Dean’s recreation of the print is also featured in Dylan, Lennon, Marx and God by Jon Stewart.

The following year, in 2013, inspired by a newspaper article in which Stephen Hawking described his reception for time travellers, Dean obtained permission from Hawking to create a letterpress-printed invitation to this event. Four variations were made, two limited editions of 100 copies each and two open editions. During an October 2013 meeting at Hawking’s Cambridge University office, Dean was photographed presenting Hawking with an artist’s proof of the print and Hawking also requested an additional copy. Following Hawking’s death in 2018, one of these prints subsequently sold for £11,250 at auction in London, and the other print – which had been displayed in Hawking’s Cambridge University office – became part of the Science Museum collection in 2021.

Dean’s Time Traveller’s Invitation poster has featured in books including To Infinity and Beyond: A Journey of Cosmic Discovery by Neil deGrasse Tyson and Lindsey Nyx Walker and Stephen Hawking: Genius at Work by Roger Highfield as well as a stamp issue by the Royal Mail. In 2014 Dean started work on another project which eventually became 2269, a collaboration with friend Michael Ogden and inspired by Hawking's time traveller party, which seeks to bring about ‘The Greatest Party of All Time’ on June 6th, 2269.

Dean lives and works in London, where he runs Novagram (a creative agency) and Kite (an online print store).
