= Gary D. Foster =

Gary D. Foster is a British phytopathologist.

== Education ==
Gary Foster was educated at Banbridge Academy from 1976-1983. Foster then read microbiology at Queen's University Belfast, graduating in 1986. Four years later, he received a doctorate from the same institution. Foster completed postdoctoral research at the University of Leicester.

== Career ==
In 1996, Foster began teaching at the University of Bristol. Foster founded the journal Molecular Plant Pathology in 2000, serving as chief editor through 2012. Foster was elected a fellow of the Royal Society of Biology in 2011.
