= Our Song (Yes song) =

1983 Yes song

Song by Yes

from the album 90125
- Released: 28 October 1983
- Genre: Progressive rock
- Length: 4:18
- Label: Atco
- Songwriter(s): Jon Anderson, Trevor Rabin, Chris Squire, Alan White, Tony Kaye
- Producer(s): Trevor Horn

"Our Song" is a song by the progressive rock band Yes, from their 1983 album 90125. It reached number 32 on the U.S. Mainstream Rock chart in 1983.

== Details ==
"Our Song" was written by Yes members Jon Anderson (vocals), Trevor Rabin (guitars and keyboards), Chris Squire (bass), Alan White (drums) and Tony Kaye (keyboards). The lyrics make references to the song "Rule, Britannia!" and the city of Toledo, Ohio which is mentioned prominently in the first verse as "just another good stop along the good king's highway" and "the silver city". According to White, Yes's 1977 show in Toledo was especially memorable to the band, mainly because of the temperature inside the Toledo Sports Arena: it was the hottest venue the band had performed in, reaching 126 °F (52 °C). As a result of the Toledo mention, "Our Song" received heavy airplay in Toledo following the release of 90125.

"Our Song" reached number 32 on the U.S. Mainstream Rock chart in 1983. It was also released as a B-side of the number-one hit single "Owner of a Lonely Heart".
