= Molecular Plant Pathology =

- Discipline: Phytopathology
- Language: English
- Edited by: Ralph A. Dean

Publication details
- History: 2000-present
- Publisher: Wiley-Blackwell on behalf of the British Society for Plant Pathology
- Frequency: 12/year
- Impact factor: 4.188 (2017)

Standard abbreviations
- ISO 4: Mol. Plant Pathol.

Indexing
- CODEN: MPPAFD
- ISSN: 1464-6722 (print); 1364-3703 (web)
- LCCN: 00220243
- OCLC no.: 44706841

Links
- Journal homepage; Online access; Online archive

Molecular Plant Pathology is a monthly open access peer-reviewed scientific journal published by Wiley-Blackwell on behalf of the British Society for Plant Pathology. It was established in January 2000 by Gary D. Foster, University of Bristol, who acted as editor-in-chief from 2000 to 2012. The journal covers research concerning plant pathology, in particular its molecular aspects such as plant-pathogen interactions. The current editor-in-chief is Ralph A. Dean (North Carolina State University). The journal has a 2025 impact factor of 5.0, ranking it 30th out of 223 journals in the category "Plant Sciences". The journal became open access in January 2019.

== Chief editors ==
- Gary D. Foster (2000–2012)
- Martin B. Dickman (2012–2017)
- Ralph A. Dean (since 2017)
