= 90125 =

1983 studio album by Yes

Studio album by Yes
- Released: 7 November 1983
- Recorded: November 1982 – May 1983
- Studios: SARM and AIR Studios (London, England)
- Genres: Pop rock; new wave; synth-pop; progressive rock
- Length: 44:34
- Label: Atco
- Producers: Trevor Horn; Yes

Yes chronology
Classic Yes (1981)	90125 (1983)	9012Live: The Solos (1985)

Singles from 90125
- 1. "Owner of a Lonely Heart" Released: 24 October 1983; 2. "Leave It" Released: February 1984; 3. "It Can Happen" Released: 4 June 1984

90125 (Note: Pronounced as nine-oh-one-two-five) is the eleventh studio album by the English progressive rock band Yes, released on 7 November 1983 by Atco Records. After Yes disbanded in 1981, following the Drama (1980) tour, bassist Chris Squire, drummer Alan White and Trevor Rabin (guitarist, singer, songwriter) formed Cinema, and began recording an album with original Yes keyboardist Tony Kaye, who had been fired in 1971. They adopted a more commercial and pop-oriented musical direction as the result of their new material, much of which derived from Rabin's demos. During the mixing stage, former Yes singer Jon Anderson, who had left in 1980, accepted an invitation to return and record the co-lead vocals, and subsequently Cinema became the new lineup of Yes.

Named for its Atco catalogue number, 90125 was released to a generally positive reception and introduced the band to a new generation of fans. It reached No. 5 on the US Billboard 200 and No. 16 on the UK Albums Chart, and remains their best selling album with several million copies sold in the US. Of the album's four singles, "Owner of a Lonely Heart" was the most successful and is the group's only song to have topped the US Billboard Hot 100 chart. "Cinema" earned the group a Grammy Award for Best Rock Instrumental Performance. Yes toured extensively for the album in 1984 and 1985, including two headline shows at the inaugural 1985 Rock in Rio festival. The album was remastered in 2004 with previously unreleased bonus tracks.

== Background ==
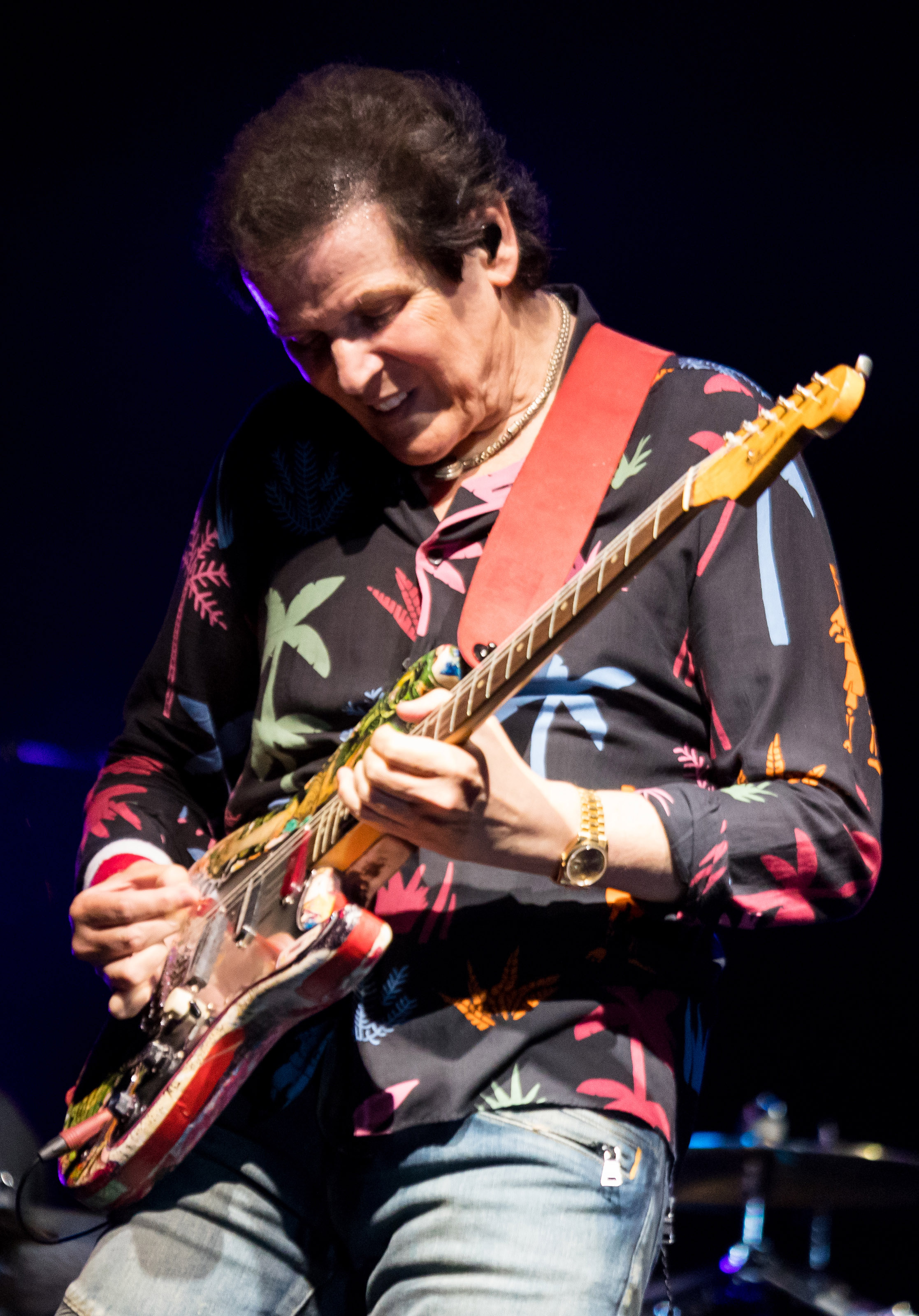
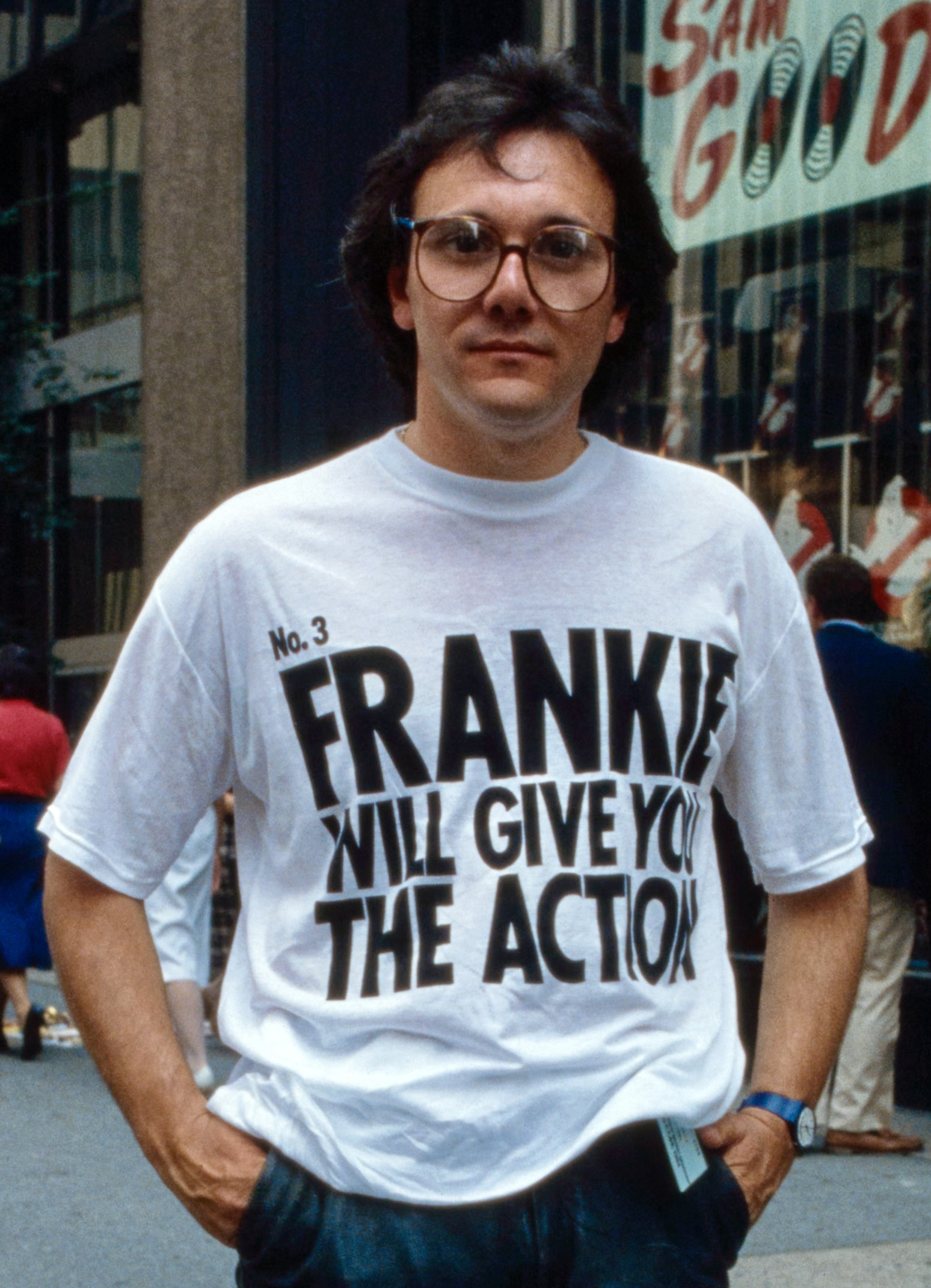
90125 added guitarist Trevor Rabin (left) to the lineup, while Trevor Horn (right) shifted from vocalist to a producer role.

In December 1980, the Yes line-up of bassist Chris Squire, guitarist Steve Howe, drummer Alan White, singer Trevor Horn, and keyboardist Geoff Downes, completed their 1980 tour in support of the band's tenth album, Drama. While the North American leg was largely successful, the subsequent UK leg received a mixed reaction feedback from the fans, many of whom were unaccepting of Horn and Downes as replacements for Jon Anderson and Rick Wakeman. The group disbanded in early 1981; Horn became a record producer, Howe and Downes co-formed the supergroup Asia, and Squire and White remained together and continued to write material, including their 1981 Christmas single "Run with the Fox". Later in 1981, the two entered sessions with Jimmy Page with the aim of forming a new band named XYZ, but the project was shelved over management differences and singer Robert Plant's dislike of the material. According to White, some ideas that the three had rehearsed ended up on 90125.

By 1982, South African guitarist Trevor Rabin had moved from London to Los Angeles and had sent a demo tape to various record labels with the intent of releasing a fourth solo album. During this time, Atlantic Records manager Phil Carson, a longtime fan and associate of Yes throughout the 1970s, sought new musicians to work with Squire and White, and was introduced to Rabin by producer Mutt Lange, whom Rabin used to work with as a session musician. Carson had Rabin meet and play with Squire and White in London. Rabin recalled the first sessions "didn't sound great but it felt good ... there was a lot of potential". This led to Rabin turning down a solo deal from RCA Records as he wished to work within a group context, especially with a "great rhythm section". The three entered rehearsals for an album using most of Rabin's demos, including "Owner of a Lonely Heart", "Hold On", and "Changes" which displayed a more commercial and pop-oriented direction and less complex structure than previous Yes music. With such a direction, Squire recruited original Yes keyboardist Tony Kaye, who had left in 1971, feeling his simpler style of playing was more suited to the music. Horn followed suit as a potential lead singer, but after unsuccessful rehearsals, opted to become their producer. The four named themselves Cinema with the intent of establishing a new identity and to distance themselves from their Yes past. The band rehearsed and arranged the songs for seven months, then spent another seven recording the album with Horn producing.

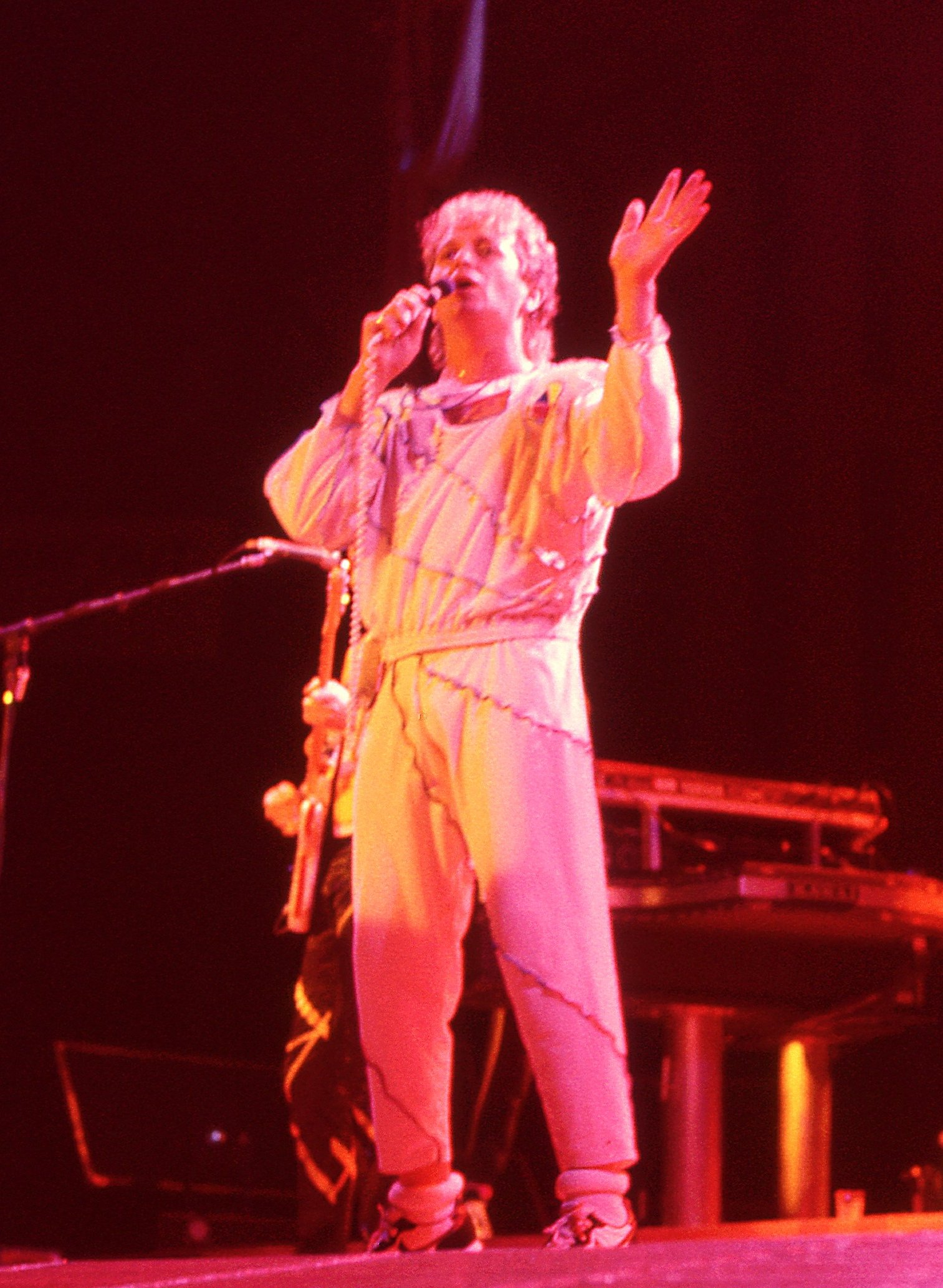
Jon Anderson accepted the offer to rejoin the band as vocalist.

Around six months into the album, Kaye left after clashing with Horn. Rabin saw it as "a mutual parting" as Kaye resisted learning the modern keyboard technology that the band were using, leaving Rabin to handle most of the keyboard parts. Matters were complicated further when management deemed Squire and Rabin's lead vocals not distinctive enough, so Carson suggested the group have Anderson return to sing the songs. Squire got in touch with Anderson, who had returned to England in April 1983 after working in France. They listened to the tape in Squire's car outside Anderson's home due to past acrimony between the pair's wives. Anderson liked the songs and got involved, making minor changes to the lyrics and arrangements. With all the instrumental tracks and backing vocals down, Anderson's lead vocals would be completed within three weeks. By this time the album had cost £300,000 to make, half of which came from Carson himself. With no more funds left to finish it, Carson flew to Paris and played the tape to Atlantic founder Ahmet Ertegun, who had signed Yes in 1969. Ertegun, interested in the prospect of a new album with Anderson on vocals, agreed to pay the remaining costs.

As the album neared completion, news reports in June and July 1983 indicate that Kaye, though he had played on it, was unsure whether to rejoin. The album was given the provisional title The New Yes Album, a reference to their third album, The Yes Album (1971), but the group opted for an alternative name to distance themselves from Yes and decided upon its allocated catalogue number on their label Atco Records, a subsidiary of Atlantic. It was 90124 initially, but sleeve designer Garry Mouat said: "Because they couldn't get consistency worldwide with that number, it got changed to 90125. I've still got some rough tour t-shirts and sleeves with the original number."

After the band introduced themselves as Cinema on MTV, they received legal threats from other bands with the same name. This prompted Carson to suggest that they continue as Yes, as the group now consisted of four past Yes members. When Rabin, who wished the album to be judged in its own right, was eventually persuaded, work began on promotion and rehearsals with keyboardist Eddie Jobson, formerly of Roxy Music and U.K. Duncan Mackay, formerly of Cockney Rebel and 10cc, was also considered for the position. Jobson appeared in the video for "Owner of a Lonely Heart" and was reported in the press as a Yes member as late as November 1983; however, seeking to consolidate the band's legal identity as Yes, management came to an agreement with Kaye who returned after touring with Badfinger. Unimpressed with the change, citing "political problems" within the group, and a lack of interest in sharing live duties with Kaye, Jobson left by early 1984.

== Production ==
=== Recording ===
Recording began in November 1982 at SARM Studios in London while the group was known as Cinema, with Horn as producer; "Hold On" was produced by Horn and Yes. Production was assisted by Gary Langan and Julian Mendelsohn, both of whom also worked on Drama, with Stuart Bruce and Keith Finney.

=== Songs ===
"Owner of a Lonely Heart" was one of the songs from Rabin's set of demos; its bass line and its hook had been written while he was in the bathroom. When the song was chosen for inclusion on the album, Squire replaced Rabin's original bridge. The song features a sample from the horn section of "Kool Is Back" by Funk, Inc., that Horn intended to use on an album by Malcolm McLaren, which he was also producing. The sample was then stored onto his Fairlight CMI and played by White. Rabin had used the same guitar tone for the opening on a session he did for Manfred Mann's Earth Band, which involved panning two guitar tracks left and right and aimed for a sound "as heavy as possible".

"Hold On" was originally titled "Moving In"; the final song was an amalgamation of two songs Rabin had written as they both had the same tempo. The chorus of "Hold On" was retained with its verses taken from "Moving In".

"It Can Happen" was written on the piano by Squire, with its introduction put together by Rabin to go with his piano chords.

"Changes" was another song from Rabin's demos, with its introduction put together by White. Rabin developed it during a "depressed time", after a potential solo album deal with Geffen Records fell through as they wished for him to join a band and play more "like Foreigner".

"Cinema" is an instrumental track recorded live at AIR Studios. Originally the group developed an unreleased 20-minute song named "Time" and decided to include its two-minute opening on the final album.

"Leave It" developed from a bass line from Squire and a melody from Rabin. When it came to recording the song, the band were not satisfied with the drum sound they were getting in the studio, so they recorded the vocals first. However, one of the engineers had removed the song's click track time references, causing various synchronisation problems. Rabin spent as much as three days re-doing the vocals onto a Synclavier, but it "didn't feel completely right. So we redid the whole thing on top of the Synclavier stuff", a process that took several weeks.

The lyrics to "Our Song" mentions the city of Toledo, Ohio, itself a reference to the band's show at the Toledo Sports Arena on their 1977 tour where the temperature on stage reached 126 °F (52 °C). The song received considerable radio airplay in the Toledo area.

"City of Love" was inspired by Rabin's visit to Harlem in New York City while on his way to a rehearsal with Foreigner. His taxi arrived at the wrong address in a dangerous part of the area. Upon his return to Los Angeles, Rabin started to write an "ominous kind of thing" which came easy to him following the experience, "the idea of waiting for the night to come ... the derelicts came out of the sewers at nighttime to be thugs. Later Jon put his slant on it which made it more interesting". The opening features a looped snippet of the introduction to Pines of Rome by Italian composer Ottorino Respighi as part of the backing track.

"Hearts" is the album's second track that is credited to the whole group on the album sleeve, though according to BMI records (see BMI work #548280) the song is officially credited to just Rabin, Anderson, and Squire. (In turn, the official songwriting credit for "Cinema" goes to the whole group, while the album sleeve does not credit Anderson.) Rabin came up with the chorus and bridge a few months prior to meeting Squire and White for the first time; Kaye wrote its keyboard introduction, Rabin developed a melody from it, and Anderson developed its counter-melody.

=== Sleeve design ===
The album's logo was designed and created by Garry Mouat at Assorted Images on an Apple IIe computer, and a variant would be used on Yes's next studio album Big Generator. Trevor Rabin's 2003 album 90124 uses the same cover design with colour and text variations.

"I became involved as I'd worked with Trevor Horn when he set up the ZTT record label..." Mouat told Classic Rock. "At that point the band were called Cinema. The original design was similar to the eventual sleeve, but with the elliptical grey Y on its side and without the stick, to make it a C. But when Jon Anderson came back, they reverted to Yes... I know some fans think that sleeve was inappropriate, but Yes wanted something completely different to the Roger Dean works, and were interested in using modern design technology, as it fitted the new techniques they were using."

== Release ==
90125 was released on 7 November 1983. It reached No. 5 in the US, becoming the band's first to do so since their Relayer album nine years prior. The album also peaked at No. 16 in the UK.

Four singles were released from 90125; "Owner of a Lonely Heart" was released a month prior to the album and reached No. 1 on the Billboard Hot 100 for two weeks. In 1984, "Changes", "Leave It", and "It Can Happen" reached the top ten on the Billboard Top Tracks chart.

In 1985, "Cinema" won a Grammy Award for Best Rock Instrumental Performance and 90125 received a nomination for Best Rock Performance by a Duo or Group with Vocal.

=== Reception ===
Professional ratings
Review scores
Source	Rating
AllMusic	4.5/5 stars
Pitchfork	7.8/10
Rolling Stone	3/5 stars
The Rolling Stone Album Guide	3/5 stars

A review in The Morning Call considered 90125 one of the band's best releases, calling it the "missing link" between the popular earlier albums The Yes Album (1971) and Fragile (1971). It described the keyboard parts as "dreamy" and at times "a contemporary rock attack", favouring this style over the more flamboyant approach adopted by former Yes keyboardist Rick Wakeman. The review also stated that the "stalwart" rhythm section of Squire and White "hasn't lost anything", and named Rabin as "the biggest surprise" of the group who "adds a much needed gutsiness". Furthermore, the review compared "Cinema" to a Jeff Beck track.

In a review for the Los Angeles Times, Terry Atkinson noted the prominent role of Rabin in the group but believed it falls short of the band's previous albums because of Anderson's reduced input into the songs, or a lack of the "old inspiration". Atkinson named "Hearts" as touching on the "monumental yet warm" music Yes had made in the 1970s, specifically "Awaken" from Going for the One (1977). Nonetheless, Atkinson wrote the album is "densely dynamic" and liked "Owner of a Lonely Heart" for being "catchy" and "full of unexpected turns", and wrote the simpler tracks "Our Song" and "Changes" allowed Yes to change their sound "without too seriously damaging its reputation". He concluded that 90125 is "enjoyable, only somewhat disappointing".

J. D. Considine gave a mostly favourable review of 90125 for Rolling Stone. He points out "Owner of a Lonely Heart" sounds "too hip, too street-smart for a band whose idea of a pop song was once something as rococo as "Roundabout", yet credits the band's reinvention to Horn's production with "flashy pop sensibility" and his handling of the group's vocal harmonies. He thought "Cinema" and "Our Song" showed Yes displaying "old tricks" with such "overblown" tracks, though complimented the record as a whole for its accessibility. Billboard believed that the album would "appease both old fans and potential new ones", saying that Anderson's vocals "provide the link to the band's past".

BAM magazine praised 90125, thinking Yes' "dramatic rise from the ashes of rock's touring heaps" had created "some of the year's freshest, most un-dinosaur-like music" with its "stunning blend of pop, synthetics, fusion and classical music".

Critic and author Martin Popoff thought 90125 was the band's most "successful and sociable album" of their entire catalogue, comparing "Owner of a Lonely Heart" to the Police. He declared the record "a rich album experience with legs". In a retrospective review for AllMusic, Paul Collins gave 90125 four-and-a-half stars out of five, calling it "a stunning self-reinvention by a band that many had given up for dead" while complimenting Horn's "slick" production work and the "crisp" synthesisers on "Changes". He also cites the vocal arrangements on "Leave It" and the "beautifully sprawling" "Hearts" as high points on the record, which has "nary a duff track". David Ellefson of Megadeth stated his fondness of the album, particularly Rabin's guitar work and quality of the production. He called it "a game-changer", and named it one of his desert island discs. The album's orchestral stabs were an influence on Megadeth's first album, Killing Is My Business... and Business Is Good!.

=== Reissues ===
- 1984 – Atco – CD (remastered by WCI Record Group)
- 2002 – Elektra/EastWest Japan – "Mini LP" HDCD (Japan only; remastered by Isao Kikuchi)
- 2004 – Elektra/Rhino – "Expanded & Remastered" CD (remastered by Dan Hersch and Bill Inglot)
- 2009 – Atco – "Papersleeve" SHM-CD (Japan only; remastered by Dan Hersch and Isao Kikuchi)
- 2009 – Audio Fidelity – 24-karat gold HDCD (US only; Flat Transfer by Steve Hoffman)
- 2009 – Friday Music – 180-gram vinyl (US only; remastered by Joe Reagoso and Ron McMaster)
- 2013 – HDtracks – 24-bit digital download
- 2014 – Atlantic/Rhino – High Vibration SACD (Japan only; remastered by Isao Kikuchi)
- 2024 – Analogue Productions – Hybrid SACD (Remastered from original master tapes by Kevin Gray)

== Tour ==
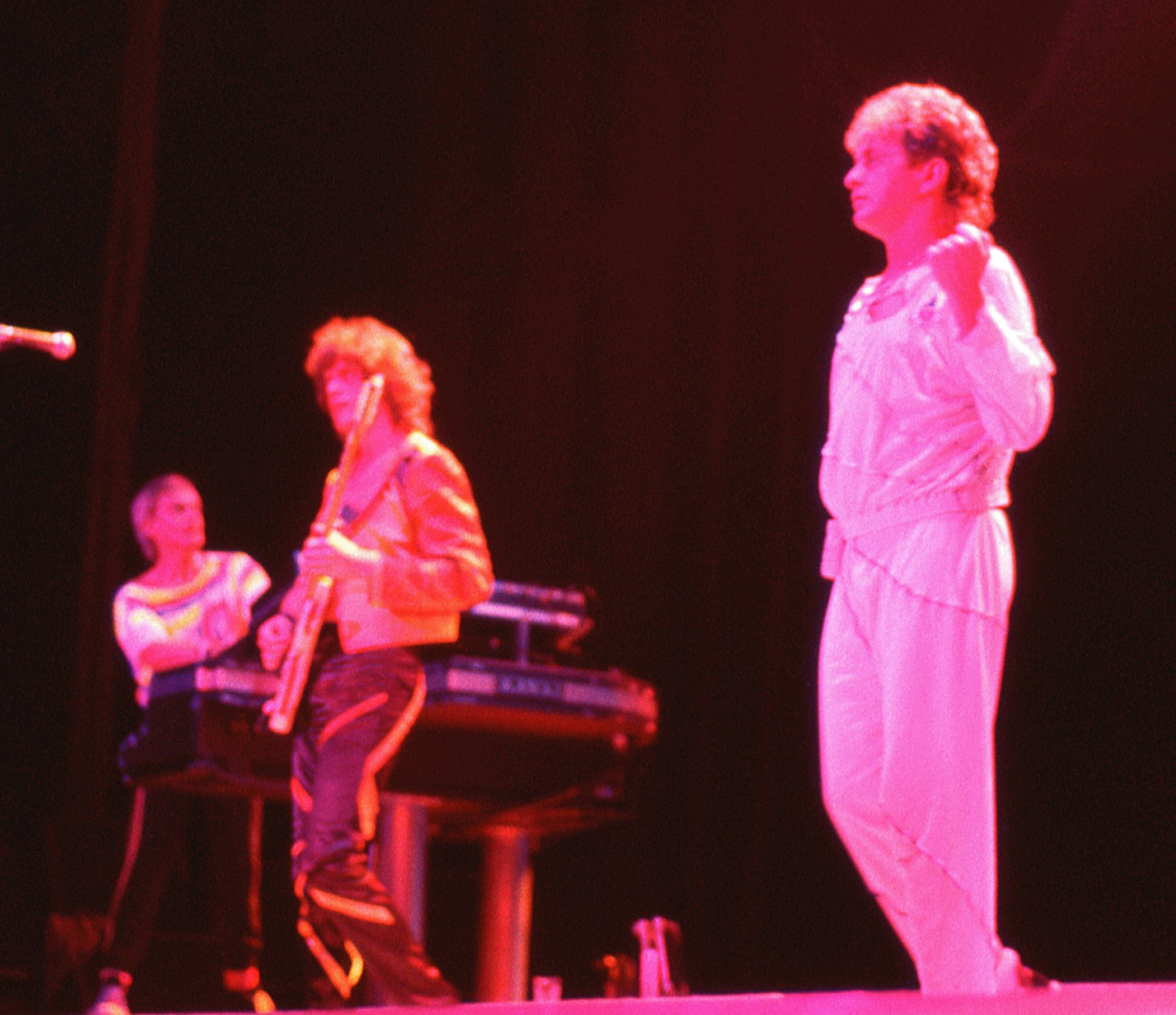
Kaye, Rabin and Anderson performing in 1984 at the NEC Arena, Birmingham

Yes promoted the album with a worldwide tour that lasted from 28 February 1984 to 9 February 1985, spanning over 110 dates. It was meant to start with a North American leg from January 1984, but the dates were cancelled after Rabin collided with a woman in a swimming pool, ruptured his spleen, and required surgery to have it removed. American new wave band Berlin were scheduled as the opening act during the first North American leg, but they were dropped from the tour due to a contract dispute. Instead, the band opened their shows with two Bugs Bunny cartoons. The show in Dortmund on 24 June saw the group performing "I'm Down" with Led Zeppelin guitarist Jimmy Page.

In 1985, Yes headlined two shows at the inaugural Rock in Rio festival. This was followed by two sold-out dates in Buenos Aires, Argentina, which marked the first time an English band had performed in the country following the Falklands War. Anderson recalled the group were escorted into the country in a private air force jet, and were surrounded by militia during the entire visit. They had a conference call with the president before their arrival, who ensured their safety despite reported death threats against the band.

== Track listing ==
Side one
No.	Title	Writer(s)	Lead vocals	Length
1.	"Owner of a Lonely Heart"	Trevor Rabin; Jon Anderson; Chris Squire; Trevor Horn	Anderson; Rabin	4:27
2.	"Hold On"	Rabin; Anderson; Squire	Anderson; Squire	5:15
3.	"It Can Happen"	Squire; Anderson; Rabin	Anderson; Squire	5:29
4.	"Changes"	Rabin; Anderson; Alan White	Rabin; Anderson	6:16
Total length:				21:37

Side two
No.	Title	Writer(s)	Vocals	Length
5.	"Cinema"	Squire; Rabin; White; Tony Kaye	Instrumental	2:09
6.	"Leave It"	Squire; Rabin; Horn	Rabin; Anderson	4:10
7.	"Our Song"	Anderson; Squire; Rabin; White; Kaye	Anderson	4:16
8.	"City of Love"	Rabin; Anderson	Anderson	4:48
9.	"Hearts"	Anderson; Squire; Rabin; White; Kaye	Anderson; Rabin	7:34
Total length:				22:57

2004 CD bonus tracks
No.	Title	Writer(s)	Extra notes	Length
10.	"Leave It" (single remix)	Squire; Rabin; Horn	Same as the "Leave It (Remix)" version on Twelve Inches on Tape; remixed by Steve Lipson	3:56
11.	"Make It Easy"	Rabin	First issued on Yesyears (1991); performed by Cinema; vocal: Rabin	6:12
12.	"It Can Happen" (Cinema version)	Squire; Anderson; Rabin	First issued on Yesyears (1991); vocal: Squire	6:05
13.	"It's Over"	Rabin	Previously unreleased; performed by Cinema; vocal: Rabin	5:41
14.	"Owner of a Lonely Heart" (extended remix)	Rabin; Anderson; Squire; Horn	Similar to "Owner of a Lonely Heart (Red and Blue Mix)" on Twelve Inches on Tape. This version begins and ends differently and is 45 seconds shorter.	7:05
15.	"Leave It" ("A capella" version)	Squire; Rabin; Horn	Mixed by Lipson	3:18
Total length:				1:16:51 (76:51)

== Personnel ==
Credits are adapted from the album's 1983 and 2004 liner notes.

Yes

- Jon Anderson – lead and backing vocals
- Chris Squire – bass guitar, vocals
- Trevor Rabin – guitars, keyboards, vocals
- Alan White – drums, percussion, backing vocals, Fairlight CMI
- Tony Kaye – keyboards

Production

- Trevor Horn – production
- Yes – co-production on "Hold On", production (tracks 11–13)
- Gary Langan – engineering
- Nigel Luby – engineering (tracks 11–13)
- Trevor Rabin – engineering (tracks 11–13)
- Julian Mendelsohn – additional engineering
- Stuart Bruce – additional engineering
- Keith Finney – assistant engineer
- Jonathan Jeczalik – keyboard programming
- Dave Lawson – keyboard programming
- Bob Ludwig – mastering
- Garry Mouat – album sleeve

== Charts ==
Chart (1983–84)	Peak position
Australian Albums (Kent Music Report)	27
Austrian Albums (Ö3 Austria)	9
Canada Top Albums/CDs (RPM)	3
Dutch Albums (Album Top 100)	4
French Albums (SNEP)	2
German Albums (Offizielle Top 100)	2
Italian Albums (Musica e Dischi)	10
Japanese Albums (Oricon)	9
New Zealand Albums (RMNZ)	25
Norwegian Albums (VG-lista)	8
Swedish Albums (Sverigetopplistan)	7
Swiss Albums (Schweizer Hitparade)	3
UK Albums (Official Charts)	16
US Billboard 200	5

== Certifications ==
Region	Certification	Certified units/sales
Argentina (CAPIF)	Gold	30,000^{^}
Australia (ARIA)	2× Platinum	140,000^{^}
Austria (IFPI Austria)	Gold	25,000^{*}
Canada (Music Canada)	2× Platinum	200,000^{^}
France (SNEP)	Gold	100,000^{*}
Germany (BVMI)	Platinum	500,000^{^}
Italy (FIMI)	Platinum	100,000^{*}
Japan (RIAJ)	Platinum	275,000
Netherlands (NVPI)	Gold	50,000^{^}
New Zealand (RMNZ)	2× Platinum	30,000^{^}
United Kingdom (BPI)	Gold	100,000^{^}
United States (RIAA)	3× Platinum	3,000,000^{^}
^{*} Sales figures based on certification alone.^{^} Shipments figures based on certification alone.

== Sources ==
- Welch, Chris (2008). Close to the Edge – The Story of Yes. Omnibus Press. ISBN 978-1-84772-132-7.
- Schinder, Scott; Schwartz, Andy (2008). Icons of Rock: Velvet Underground; The Grateful Dead; Frank Zappa; Led Zeppelin; Joni Mitchell; Pink Floyd; Neil Young; David Bowie; Bruce Springsteen; Ramones; U2; Nirvana. Greenwood Publishing Group. ISBN 9780313338472.
- Chambers, Stuart (2002). Yes: An Endless Dream of '70s, '80s and '90s Rock Music: An Unauthorized Interpretative History in Three Phases. General Store Publishing House. ISBN 978-1-894-26347-4.
- Morse, Tim (1996). Yesstories: "Yes" in Their Own Words. St Martin's Press. ISBN 978-0-312-14453-1.*Popoff, Martin (2016). Time and a Word: The Yes Story. Soundcheck Books. ISBN 978-0-993-21202-4.
