= Thomas Dean =

Thomas or Tom(my) Dean or Deen may refer to:

- Tom Dean (Hampshire cricketer) (1920–2004), English cricketer
- Tom Dean (Gloucestershire cricketer) (1881–1964), cricketer who played once for Gloucestershire in 1908
- Tom Dean (artist), Canadian conceptual artist
- Tommy Dean (born 1945), shortstop in Major League Baseball
- Thomas Dean (computer scientist), professor at Brown University and researcher at Google
- Tom Dean (swimmer) (born 2000), British swimmer
- Tom Dean (basketball), see Morgan State Bears men's basketball
- Tommy Dean (comedian), American-Australian comedian who appeared on Stand Up Australia
- Thomas Dean (mechanic), see Henkes Islands
- Thomas B. Deen, see List of members of the National Academy of Engineering

== See also ==
- Thomas Deane (disambiguation)
- Tommy Deans, Scottish footballer
- Dean Thomas (disambiguation)
