= Justice Dean =

Justice Dean may refer to:

- Arthur Dean (judge) (1893–1970), associate justice of the Supreme Court of Victoria
- Gilbert Dean (1819–1870), justice of the New York Supreme Court, and ex officio a judge of the New York Court of Appeals
- James R. Dean (1862–1936), associate justice of the Nebraska Supreme Court
- John Dean (Pennsylvania judge) (1835—1905), justice of the Pennsylvania Supreme Court
