= General Dean =

General Dean may refer to:

- Aaron R. Dean II (fl. 1980s–2010s), U.S. Army brigadier general
- Clyde D. Dean (1930–2001), U.S. Marine Corps lieutenant general
- James Theodore Dean (1865–1939), U.S. Army brigadier general
- Richard D. Dean (born 1929), U.S. Army brigadier general
- William F. Dean (1899–1981), U.S. Army major general

== See also ==
- John R. Deane (1896–1982), U.S. Army major general
- John R. Deane Jr. (1919–2013), U.S. Army general
- Tony Deane-Drummond (1917–2012), British Army major general
