= Gordon Dean =

Gordon Dean may refer to:

- Gordon Dean (lawyer) (1905–1958), American lawyer and chairman of the US Atomic Energy Commission
- Gordon Dean (Australian politician) (1942–2023), Australian politician
- Gordon Howlett Dean (1922–2008), politician in Ontario, Canada
- Gordon Dean (Alias), a character in the TV series Alias
