= Theodosia Ann Dean =

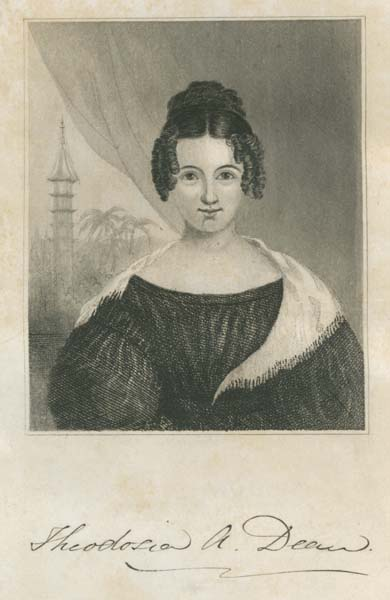
Theodosia A. Dean

Theodosia Ann Dean (29 March 1819 – 29 March 1843) was an English missionary to China where she founded and taught at a school. During her career of five years among the Chinese, she learned to read, write, and speak the Chinese language with rare accuracy for a foreigner.

== Biography ==
Theodosia Ann Barker was born on 29 March 1819, at Thetford, England. She was the daughter of Edmund H. Barker, a scholar, and the editor and author of several literary works. She had an older sister.

Discovering in early life a love for books and a capacity for acquiring knowledge, the parents of Dean afforded her every opportunity for study, under their tutelage. From the age of thirteen to sixteen, she attended the boarding school in Bracondale, Norwich, kept by the nieces of Henry Kirke White. At the age of seventeen, after completing her studies, including learning several European languages, she started studying the Chinese language under the instruction of the Chinese professor in the University of London.

The following year, she was appointed to sail for China, under the patronage of the Society for Promotion of Female Education in the East. For a few months before her departure, Dean prepared for her voyage and spent time with home friends.

On 9 August 1837, Dean left Hackney and proceeded via steamer to Gravesend, from where she immediately embarked on board the ship Hashemy. She enjoyed the companionship of fellow-voyagers from England to Batavia, but on to China, she was a lone passenger.

On reaching Macau, she became a member in the family of Rev. Karl Gützlaff, and continued her study of the Chinese language. In March 1838, at Macau, she married Rev. William Dean of the American Baptist Foreign Mission Society. Together, they proceeded to Bangkok, Siam, where she soon established a Chinese school and provided instruction for the next five years. Through her teaching and study, Dean became well-versed in speaking and reading the Chinese language.

The health of her husband failing at Bangkok, she sailed with him for China in 1841, where they arrived in May 1842 at Macao, at which place their daughter was born. In the latter part of October 1842, she took up her residence at British Hong Kong. Here, she and her husband, who was affiliated with the American Baptist Mission, organized a new Chinese church, and planted a new station for the class of Chinese speaking the Tie Chiú dialect.

== Death and legacy ==
On 21 March 1843, in Hong Kong, she became ill with an attack of smallpox, and died on 29 March 1843, her 24th birthday.

In 1851, Francis Pharcellus Church published her biography, Notices of the Life of Theodosia Ann Barker Dean, wife of Rev. William Dean, Missionary to China.
