= Peter J. Dean =

American management consultant

Peter J. Dean (born 1946) is the founder and president of Leaders By Design, a company that coaches leadership development for executive men.

Dean lectured at The Wharton School and The Fels Institute of Government, both at The University of Pennsylvania where he received the MBA Core Curriculum Cluster Teaching Award at the Wharton School. He has served as a faculty member at The University of Iowa, Pennsylvania State University, Fordham University, University of Tennessee and The American College. He has published articles in the Journal of Business Ethics, Human Resource Development Quarterly, Philadelphia Business Journal, and Financial Times.

== Biography ==
Dean received his B.S. in English, Speech, Drama and Business Administration from Morningside College, Sioux City, Iowa and Ph.D. in Instructional Systems, Human Resource Management, Learning Psychology from the University of Iowa where he completed a dissertation on ‘effective and ineffective leader behaviors’. In 2001 he received an M.S. in Organizational Dynamics from the University of Pennsylvania.

Dean served in the United States Army, DOD, Military Intelligence, Germany (1968–1971).

== Books ==
- The Coachable Leader: What Future Executives Need to Know Today (in press)
- Leadership for Everyone: How to Apply the Seven Essential Skills to Become a Great Motivator, Influencer and Leader
- Philosophy and Practice of Organizational Learning, Performance and Change
- The Business of Medicine: What Every Physician Leader Needs to Know
- Performance Improvement Interventions: Methods for Organizational Learning Systems, Systems Design and Organization Culture
- Manual for Managing Business Ethics: Straight Talk About How to Do It Right
- Breaking into the Boys’ Club: 8 Ways for Women to Get Ahead in Business

== Personal life ==
Dean lives in Philadelphia, Pennsylvania, with his wife and business partner Molly Shepard.
