= Cinema (band) =

English band (1982–1983)

- Also known as: Yes
- Origin: Los Angeles
- Genres: Progressive rock
- Years active: January 1982–June 1983
- Label: Atco
- Past members: Chris Squire; Alan White; Trevor Rabin; Tony Kaye

Cinema were a short-lived English progressive rock band started in January 1982 by former Yes members Alan White and Chris Squire, with guitarist Trevor Rabin. The previous year, Squire and White had formed the abortive band XYZ with former Led Zeppelin guitarist Jimmy Page. Cinema had plans to release their debut album in 1983, and were working on a number of songs, most of which had been written by Rabin.

Later, these musicians were joined by keyboardist Tony Kaye and, eventually, Jon Anderson, both founding members of the then-disbanded Yes. They started recording the album 90125, but soon after this the band dropped the "Cinema" name, and continued as "Yes".

Demos produced from the Cinema sessions included "Make It Easy" and "It's Over", with lead vocals by Rabin, and an early version of "It Can Happen" featuring Squire on vocals. "Make It Easy" and this version of "It Can Happen" appeared on 1991's Yesyears box set compilation, and were later included as bonus tracks on the remastered version of 90125 released in 2004 by Rhino Records, as was "It's Over". Unreleased tracks worked on by Cinema include "Time," a 20-minute instrumental, and "Carry On."

The introduction from "Time" would end up as an instrumental on 90125, titled "Cinema" as a tribute to the aborted band.

== Line-up ==
- Chris Squire – Bass guitar, backing and lead vocals
- Alan White – Drums, percussion
- Trevor Rabin – Guitars, keyboards, lead and backing vocals
- Tony Kaye – Hammond organ, piano, synthesizers
