= Julia Dean =

Julia Dean may refer to:

- Julia Dean (actress, born 1878) (1878–1952), American stage and film actress
- Julia Dean (actress, born 1830) (1830–1868), American stage actress
- Julia Drake Fosdick Dean (1800–1832), American stage actress and mother of the preceding
