= Drama (Yes album) =

1980 studio album by Yes

Studio album by Yes
- Released: 22 August 1980
- Recorded: April–June 1980
- Studios: Townhouse and Sarm East, London (album); Roundhouse and RAK, London (guitars)
- Genres: Progressive rock; pop rock
- Length: 36:54
- Label: Atlantic
- Producers: Yes; Eddy Offord (backing tracks)

Yes chronology
| Tormato (1978) | Drama (1980) | Yesshows (1980) |

Singles from Drama
- 1. "Into the Lens" Released: September 1980; 2. "Run Through the Light" Released: January 1981 (US)

Drama is the tenth studio album by the English progressive rock band Yes, released on 22 August 1980 by Atlantic Records. The album is the band's only original studio release to feature singer Trevor Horn on lead vocals and marks the debut of keyboardist Geoff Downes. This major line-up alteration followed the sudden departures of long-time frontman Jon Anderson and keyboardist Rick Wakeman after aborted recording sessions in Paris and London failed to materialise into a new album. Because a concert tour had been booked prior to the personnel changes, the new line-up recorded Drama hurriedly at Townhouse Studios alongside initial tracking producer Eddy Offord, who also exited the project under fraught circumstances early on.

Musically, the album marked a significant stylistic evolution for Yes, blending the group's signature complex progressive rock structures with the sharp, electronic-driven new wave and synth-pop sensibilities popularised by Horn and Downes as members of The Buggles. The resulting material showcased a noticeably heavier and harder rock sound than the band's 1970s outputs, highlighted by the tracks "Machine Messiah" and "Tempus Fugit". The album's visual presentation marked the return of artist Roger Dean, who designed a stark, fantastical gatefold landscape to anchor the packaging.

Drama was released to a generally positive critical reception, with many contemporary reviewers welcoming the band's modernised sound. It achieved strong commercial success in Britain, peaking at No. 2 on the UK Albums Chart, but experienced a softer performance in North America, peaking at No. 18 on the US Billboard 200. The record became the band's first studio release since 1971 not to achieve an RIAA gold certification in the United States. Although the supporting transatlantic tour saw Horn face vocal strain and pushback from select British audiences over the line-up adjustments, the group disbanded at its conclusion, after which Downes and guitarist Steve Howe co-founded the supergroup Asia. Downes would eventually rejoin Yes full-time in 2011, and the Drama line-up reunited in 2018 to re-record the vocals and some instrumentation for the album Fly from Here (2011).

== Background ==
In June 1979, the Yes line-up of Jon Anderson, Chris Squire, Steve Howe, Rick Wakeman, and Alan White completed their 1978–1979 tour in support of Tormato (1978). The five members reconvened in November 1979 to begin work on a follow-up album. Seeking to address the production issues faced during the Tormato sessions, Yes chose to record in Paris and hired producer Roy Thomas Baker to oversee the project. While Anderson and Wakeman entered the sessions enthusiastically and collaborated closely on material, the rest of the band felt the compositions were too light and folk-oriented. Consequently, Squire, Howe, and White began developing heavier, more direct arrangements. The growing internal differences—described by Anderson as a "loss of respect for each other"—led to Squire, Howe, White, and Baker arriving late to sessions. This discouraged Anderson and Wakeman; the latter occasionally refused to leave his hotel room to rehearse. Conversely, Howe recalled that Wakeman would frequently throw peanuts at White's drum kit during takes of songs he disliked.

Anderson and Wakeman eventually abandoned a rehearsal to drink Calvados at a local bar, where Wakeman agreed with Anderson's assessment that the group was no longer the band they loved or wished to sustain. The sessions were ultimately canceled after White fractured a bone in his right ankle while roller skating with Richard Branson at a nightclub, leaving him unable to perform for six weeks. Following a break over Christmas, the band reconvened in London for rehearsals to rescue the project, but the environment did not improve. Anderson and Wakeman officially left the group in March 1980.

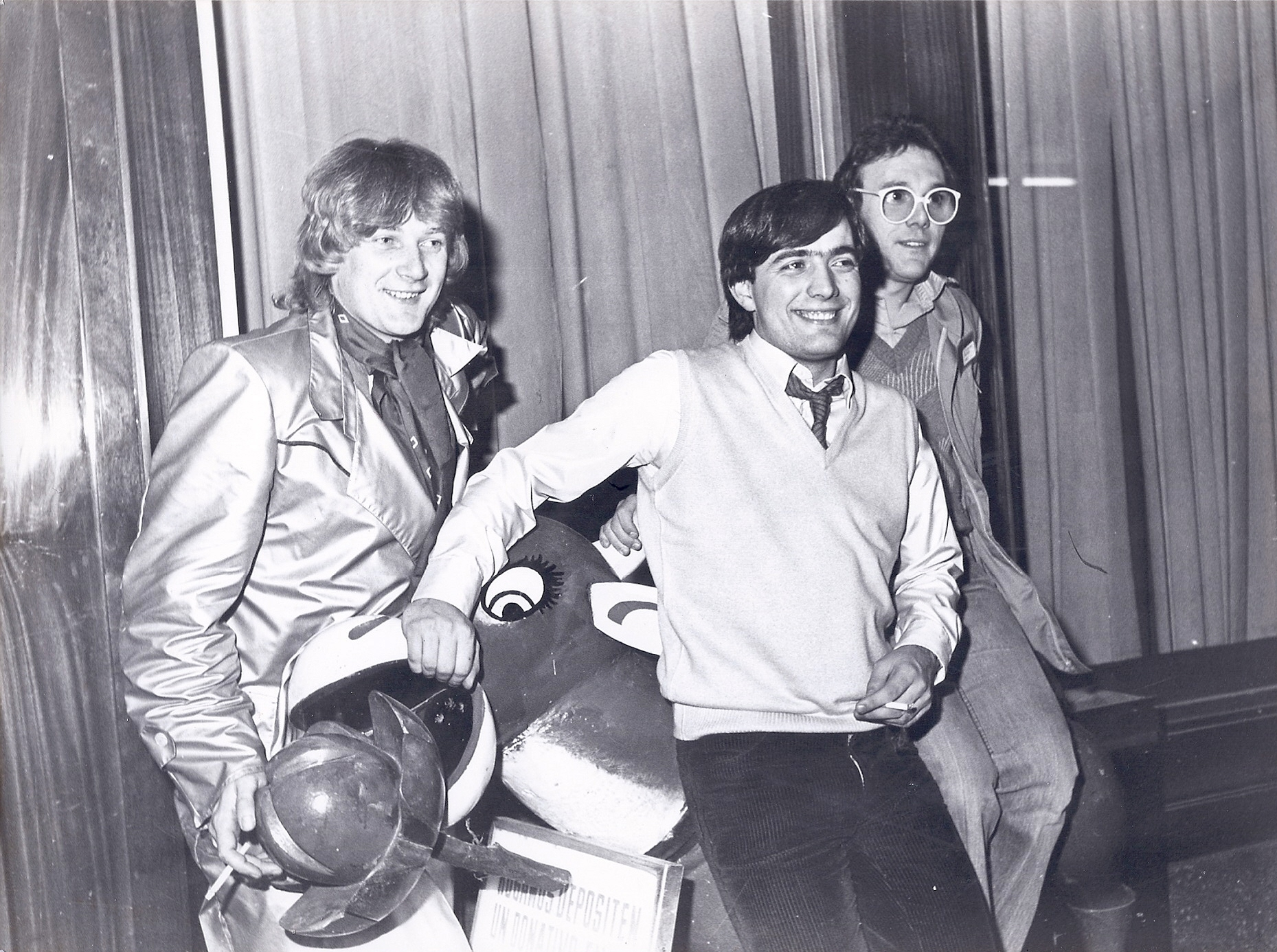
Keyboardist Geoff Downes (left) and vocalist Trevor Horn (right) of the new wave duo The Buggles joined Yes as full-time members in 1980.

Squire, Howe, and White continued to rehearse as a trio at Townhouse Studios. Concurrently, bassist and singer Trevor Horn and keyboardist Geoff Downes of the new wave duo The Buggles were experiencing international success with their 1979 hit single "Video Killed the Radio Star", and had recently hired Brian Lane as their manager. Because Lane also managed Yes and both acts shared an office, he suggested that Horn and Downes—both fans of the band—contribute a song for the trio to record. This prompted a meeting at Squire's home in Virginia Water, Surrey, where Horn performed and sang "We Can Fly from Here", a Buggles composition that had been deemed too long for their own album. Squire noted that Horn's vocal style was similar to Anderson's, and invited the duo to rehearse with the band. Squire then convinced Howe and White that the pair were suitable replacements. Downes initially felt the music the trio had arranged lacked direction, but the band wished to develop and record "We Can Fly from Here".

Horn and Downes were initially unaware of Anderson's departure, discovering the true situation only when the remaining members encouraged them to join the band full-time. Horn was reluctant to replace Anderson due to the frontman's stature among fans, but accepted the position because he believed such an opportunity would not arise again. Lane traveled to the Atlantic Records offices in New York City to announce the new line-up. His initial request for a $200,000 album advance was rejected by chief financial officer Sheldon Vogel; however, Lane leveraged a recent clerical error in which the label had accidentally transferred $400,000 to his account to secure the funding. Atlantic founder Ahmet Ertegun subsequently flew to London to assess the commercial viability of the configuration, ultimately approving the new line-up and green-lighting the album.

== Recording ==
Drama was recorded over approximately three months at Townhouse Studios in London, with additional tracking split across several locations. The band members were credited collectively as producers, with Hugh Padgham handling the primary engineering duties at the Townhouse, while Gary Langan and Julian Mendelsohn served as recording engineers for sessions at Sarm East Studios. Howe independently recorded his parts over a two-week period, assisted by engineer Pete Schwier at RAK Studios and Ashley Howe at Roundhouse Recording Studios, while the remaining instrumentation was tracked at Townhouse and Sarm East. Howe recalled that he exercised complete creative freedom during his sessions, recording most of his parts alone and successfully resisting requests from other band members to alter his bright, treble-heavy guitar tones.

Initial tracking sessions originally began with Eddy Offord, who had served as the band's primary engineer and producer between 1971 and 1975. However, his tenure was cut short due to increasingly erratic behavior. Downes recalled that Offord left under "strange circumstances" during a "fraught and manic time", though Offord retained a credit for producing the album's backing tracks. In 2021, Howe—a strict vegetarian—revealed that he had dismissed Offord after three weeks of unstable behavior, which culminated in the engineer catching a wild pigeon outside and attempting to fry it in a saucepan in the studio cafe kitchen.

Following Offord's departure, Padgham—who had previously worked with the Buggles—accepted an invitation from Horn to join the project. Padgham noted that working with Yes was challenging due to the pervasive interpersonal strain, describing the sessions as "full of dramas" and marked by high tension. To meet the album's tight scheduling constraints, Horn returned to the studio directly after his wedding ceremony, ultimately cutting his planned two-week honeymoon in Miami Beach down to a brief three-day trip to Bournemouth, which Howe also attended. Horn and Howe subsequently completed the final mixdown of the album together.

== Songs ==
=== Side one ===
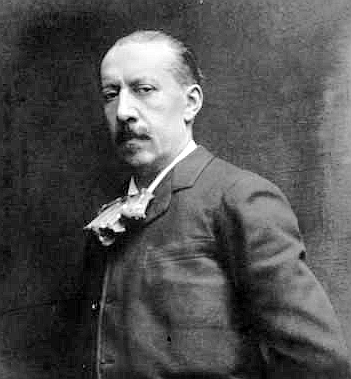
Keyboardist Geoff Downes incorporated an arpeggiated phrase from Charles-Marie Widor's Symphony for Organ No. 5 into the musical arrangements for "Machine Messiah".

According to Horn, "Machine Messiah" was composed in a single day. Music critic Chris Welch characterised Howe's opening guitar riff as "unexpectedly heavy metal". Alan White took a leading role in structuring the song's complex rhythms and time signatures. Squire initially struggled with the technical difficulty of the bass arrangements, believing certain passages were better suited for keyboards, but he was motivated by White to master the parts. Downes also praised the track's composition, highlighting its diverse structural movements and frequent dynamic shifts. While arranging his keyboard tracking layers, Downes incorporated an arpeggiated phrase from the fifth movement of the Symphony for Organ No. 5 by Charles-Marie Widor, a classical piece he had studied during his youth. The song has been highlighted by the band's collaborators as a defining element of the album's legacy. Sleeve illustrator Roger Dean cited "Machine Messiah" as one of his favorite tracks in the Yes discography. Downes similarly assessed it as the pivotal track on Drama, noting that its stylistic blend successfully epitomised the technological, pop-oriented sensibilities of the Buggles merging with the pedigree rock musicianship of Howe, Squire, and White.

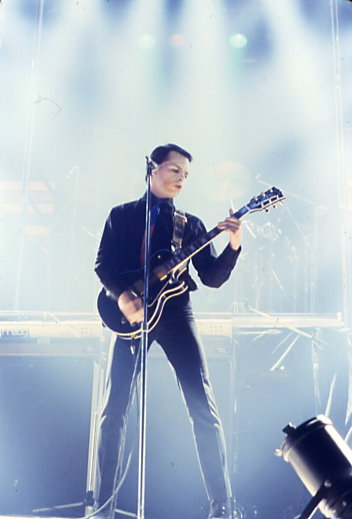
The aloof public persona of electronic musician Gary Numan inspired Trevor Horn to write "White Car" as a short, sardonic vignette.

"White Car", a brief electronic interlude lasting just over one minute, was recorded in a single afternoon. Downes played a Fairlight CMI synthesizer on the track to test its sampling capabilities. Reflecting on the process, Downes recalled: "I tried to simulate an orchestra using these samples, but it was very early days of digital sampling. The bandwidth was very narrow, but that's what gave it all that characteristic 'crunch factor'. We then added the vocoder and Trevor's vocal to the mix". Horn's lyrics were written as a sardonic spoof of electronic new wave artist Gary Numan. The composition was inspired by a real-life sighting of Numan driving a white Corvette Stingray around London, which had been presented to him by his record label, Beggars Banquet, after his single "Cars" achieved massive commercial success. Yes mistook Numan's characteristically aloof stage persona for arrogance, prompting the brief track as a commentary on his modern media image.

"Does It Really Happen?" developed from rehearsal sessions held prior to Going for the One (1977), when White conceived its foundational drum pattern. An early tracking arrangement featuring Anderson on lead vocals (and then-Yes keyboard player Patrick Moraz) was recorded under the working title "Everybody's Song", but the track was ultimately shelved. The band briefly re-activated the composition during the aborted 1979 Paris sessions with producer Roy Thomas Baker before abandoning it once more. The song was successfully completed during the Drama tracking sessions, constructed around a prominent, staccato open-string bass riff played by Squire. Horn and Downes significantly revised the underlying musical arrangements—with Downes layering Hammond organ pads and Fairlight synthesizer parts—while Horn and Squire authored entirely new lyrics to replace Anderson's original vocals. The recording concludes with an instrumental outro featuring a bass solo by Squire over White's subtle marimba flourishes. The original 1970s tracking session of "Everybody's Song" was later officially issued as a bonus track on the 2004 expanded CD remaster of Tormato (1978).

=== Side two ===
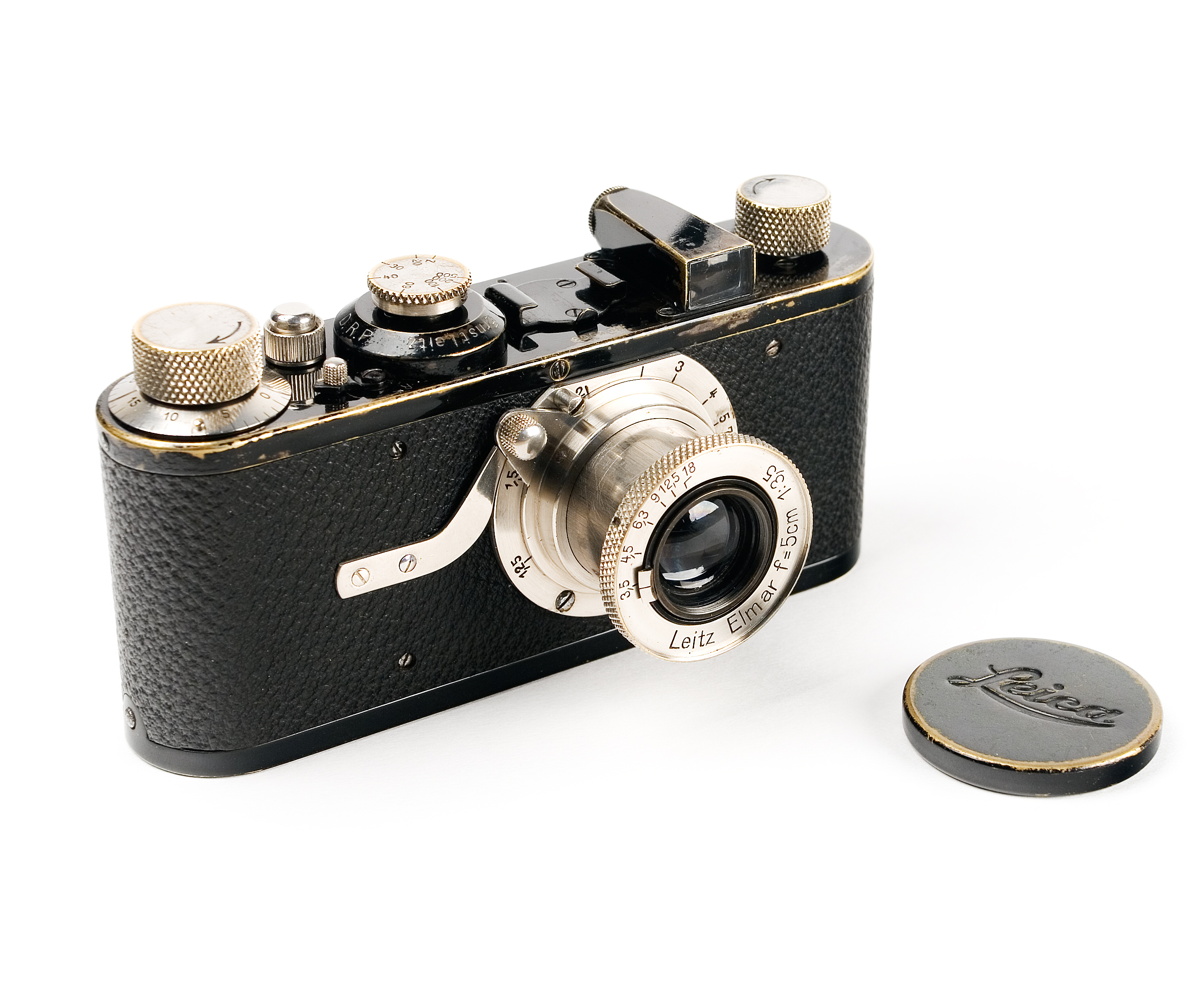
The lyrics for "Into the Lens" focus heavily on photographic concepts, with the composition originally developed under the working title "I Am a Camera".

"Into the Lens" originated as a composition written by Horn and Downes prior to joining Yes, intended for a second Buggles album under the working title "I Am a Camera". Squire took a liking to the piece and sought to re-arrange it as a Yes track, collaborating with Downes to reconstruct its instrumental layerings. Squire later reflected that the final recording suffered slightly due to the band's rushed three-month deadline, noting that the arrangement "could have been better" had they not been working against the clock. Musically, the song straddled the line between progressive rock and pop, opening with a series of complex bass rudiments played by Squire. The track marked the first point on the album where Horn completely distinguished his lead vocal style Jon Anderson's, backed by Downes layering vocals through a vocoder. Squire recalled that performing the track live on tour, specifically during a performance in Dallas, served as a major confidence booster for Horn, who sang the piece exceptionally well. Squire noted that surviving the pressure of that tour ultimately gave Horn the confidence to later return as the band's studio producer. Following the dissolution of the Drama line-up, Horn and Downes re-recorded the composition for the Buggles' second album Adventures in Modern Recording (1981), releasing it as "I Am a Camera".

"Tempus Fugit" developed from instrumental arrangements sketched out by Squire, Howe, and White in late 1979 during the band's initial writing sessions. Its title is a Latin expression that translates to "time flies". According to Howe, the name was sardonically derived from Squire's chronic habit of arriving late to rehearsals and recording sessions. Howe attributed the track's rapidly changing keys and signature ascending and descending guitar lines to the stylistic influence of pioneering jazz guitarist Charlie Christian, whose work with Benny Goodman in the late 1930s helped establish the electric guitar as a solo lead instrument. The tracking layout serves as a high-energy, traditional progressive rock jam to close the album. It opens with a choppy, syncopated organ riff by Downes before launching into a highly complex, driving pattern constructed from Squire's flanged bass and complemented by Howe's reggae- and ska-influenced guitar chops throughout the verses. Squire humorously evaluated the track's frantic, aggressive tempo as Yes's version of a punk song. The composition was structured as a self-titled thematic anthem for the group, prominently featuring rapid, tightly harmonised vocals. This culminated in a rhythmic lyrical hook where the band's name—altered through a vocoder—was repeated as an affirmative answer to the verses' philosophical inquiries. Lyrically, the track features imagery of characters running like leopards at night, a swift predatory theme that retrospective critics noted perfectly synchronised with the black panthers illustrated on Dean's front cover artwork.

=== Unreleased material ===
Yes tracked and rehearsed several additional compositions during the studio sessions that were ultimately left uncompleted for the final album. Among these were "We Can Fly from Here" and "Go Through This", both of which were integrated into the band's repertoire and performed live throughout the supporting 1980 tour. Archival concert recordings of both tracks were later officially issued on the live compilation box set The Word Is Live (2005). A third piece, an instrumental track titled "Crossfire", was shelved until it was mixed and included on the career-spanning box set In a Word: Yes (1969–) (2002).

"We Can Fly from Here" subsequently became a central component of the band's later history. In 2011, the Drama line-up reunited with Horn to expand the original Buggles composition into a multi-part, 20-minute conceptual suite, which served as the title track for Yes's twentieth studio album, Fly from Here (2011). In 2018, Horn completely remixed the album, re-recording the lead vocals himself to replace Benoit David's original tracks, and released the revised project as Fly from Here – Return Trip.

== Artwork ==
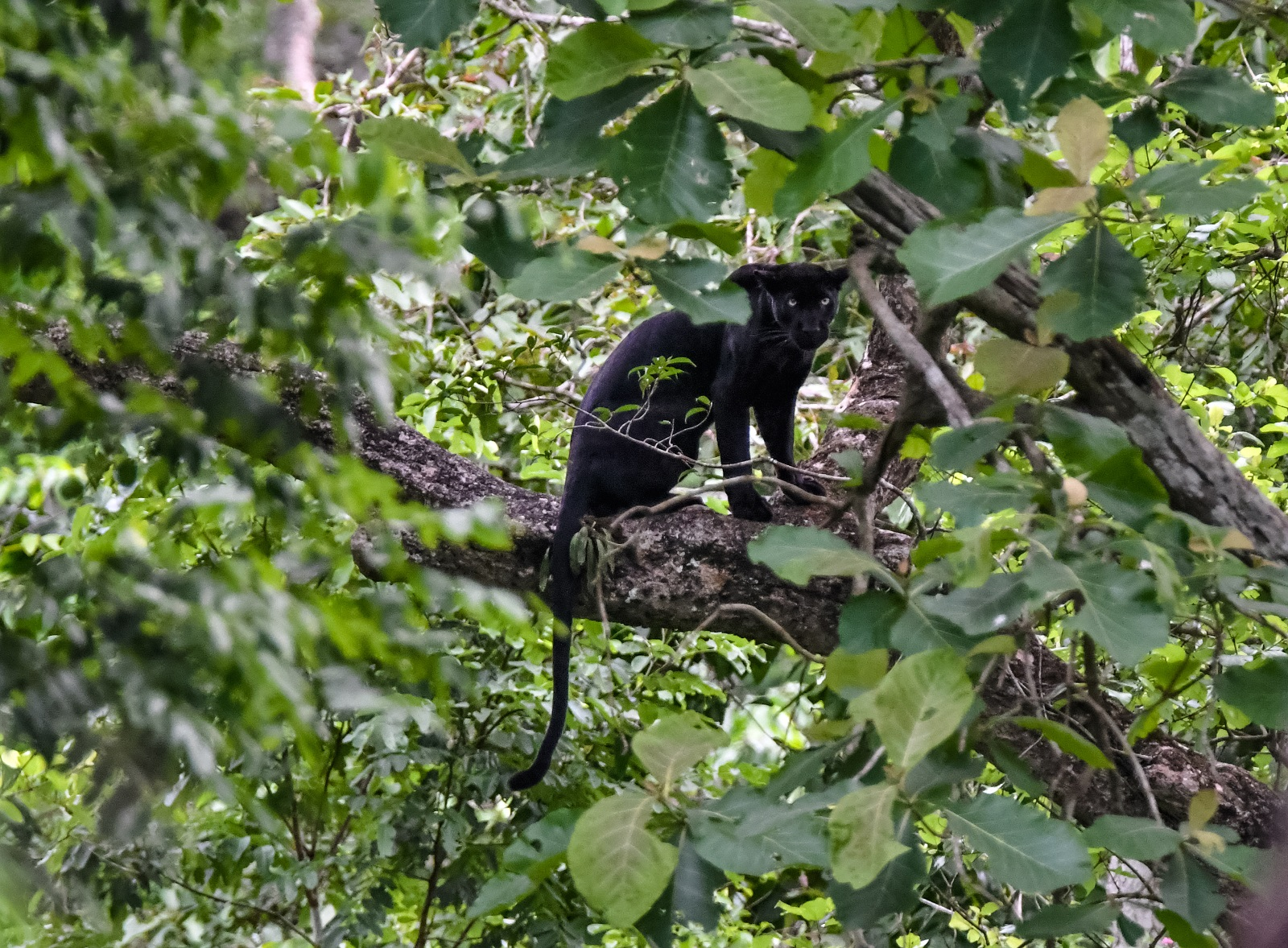
The predatory visual themes of Roger Dean's gatefold illustration synchronised with the "running like leopards" lyrical imagery featured on the track "Tempus Fugit".

The album's sleeve was designed and illustrated by Roger Dean, marking his first new artwork for a Yes release since the compilation album Yesterdays (1975). After being informed of the album's title prior to starting his work, Dean adopted what he described as an "intuitive approach" to the design process. Rather than relying on the overt fantasy and mysticism that characterized his previous pieces, he made a conscious effort to focus on elements found in reality, stating that he avoided creating things "that you couldn't see in the world today ... it's not in any degree fantastic." Dean sought to capture a dramatic, storm-driven sky to allow "the light playing across the landscape, so there were some bits that jumped out and very stark and bright, and other bits that are very dark—black on dark grey." He summarised that the final cover included a high density of visual components that ultimately blended together through a combination of his artistic training and good fortune. Reflecting on the sleeve painting, Dean noted it as one of his favourite personal designs.

== Release ==
Drama was released in August 1980. It reached No. 2 in the UK and No. 18 in the US, the band's lowest charting studio release in the US since The Yes Album (1971), which peaked at No. 40. "Into the Lens" was released as the album's sole single in 1980. The band shot music videos for "Into the Lens" and "Tempus Fugit"; both of them mimed live performances with minimal visual effects.

The album has been reissued several times; the first was in 1994 by Atlantic Records. In 2004, Rhino Records issued a remastered edition with several previously unreleased tracks, including some from the band's sessions from Paris in late 1979.

== Critical reception ==
Professional ratings
Review scores
| Source | Rating |
|---|---|
| AllMusic | 3/5 stars |
| Classic Rock | 3.5/5 stars |
| Pitchfork | 7.0/10 |
| The Rolling Stone Album Guide | 4/5 stars |

Upon release, Drama received generally positive reviews from national music critics, many of whom focused on how the new line-up maintained the band's established sound. Robin Denselow of The Guardian wrote that Horn's lyrics were tougher than Anderson's "distinctive ramblings on the mystic fringe", praising "Machine Messiah" and "Into the Lens" as standout tracks that gave the record its distinctive identity. Writing for The New York Times, Bill Carlton observed that Yes "didn't take any chances alienating the faithful" with an overt new wave or punk direction, describing the material as "more like Yes than Yes." Carlton added that the album was "full of their tried-and-true brew of orchestral, dramatic, art-rock extrapolations" while selecting "Tempus Fugit" as his personal favorite.

In the Los Angeles Times, John Mendelssohn characterised the album as "infinitely more accessible" than earlier Yes releases while remaining "highly demanding listening." In the same publication, Steve Pond noted that the group proved to anxious fans they could sound "just like the old model," describing Horn's vocal delivery as "uncanny" in its resemblance to Anderson's. Rolling Stone highlighted "Machine Messiah", "Into the Lens", and "Tempus Fugit" as highlights, remarking that the addition of Horn and Downes "has not substantially altered the Yes sound, image or presentation." The review lauded the "fresh new spirit" of the instrumentation, though it sardonically concluded that the Buggles' own hit "Video Killed the Radio Star" remained more memorable than the album itself. Rock critic Rick Johnson summarized the record as a consistent collection of "fairly solid stuff."

=== Retrospective evaluations ===
Retrospective reviews have continued to praise the album's modernised energy. In a review for AllMusic, Paul Collins wrote that Drama "rocks harder than other Yes albums" and served as a "harbinger of Yes and Asia albums to come" throughout the 1980s. Collins highlighted Squire's "emboldened" and "aggressive" basslines, White's driving drums, and Howe's "more metallic" guitar work, selecting "Machine Messiah" and "Tempus Fugit" as the album's finest tracks. In 2014, readers of Prog voted Drama the 100th greatest progressive rock album of all time.

The album's legacy has drawn mixed reflections from the band's core members. Former frontman Jon Anderson was critical, stating that the record was "not my idea of Yes" and failed to represent what the band truly stood for. Despite this, Anderson later expressed an openness to rehearsing tracks from Drama during his subsequent tenures in the group, though his offers were declined by the other members. Conversely, the participating musicians defended the record; in his 2021 memoir, Howe reflected that Drama "stands out in my estimation as a true classic Yes album," calling it a melodic "accumulation of the previous decade." Similarly, Downes stated in 2018 that the album remained the proudest achievement of his musical career.

== Tour and aftermath ==
"We could have told audiences they might want to take their tickets back because the band had changed, or just go ahead and do it, and see what happened. So we opted to do that."

— Chris Squire on the decision to tour.

Yes supported the album with a tour of North America and the UK from August to December 1980. Because Horn and Downes had never performed live on a large stadium or arena scale, the rehearsals required Downes to configure a complex multi-keyboard rig consisting of 14 separate instruments on stage. The American concerts were staged utilising the band's custom-built rotating circular stage positioned in the center of the arena floor, allowing them to perform "in the round". Horn suffered from severe performance anxiety and experienced significant vocal strain as the itinerary progressed due to the rigorous physical demands of matching Anderson's signature high-tenor register.

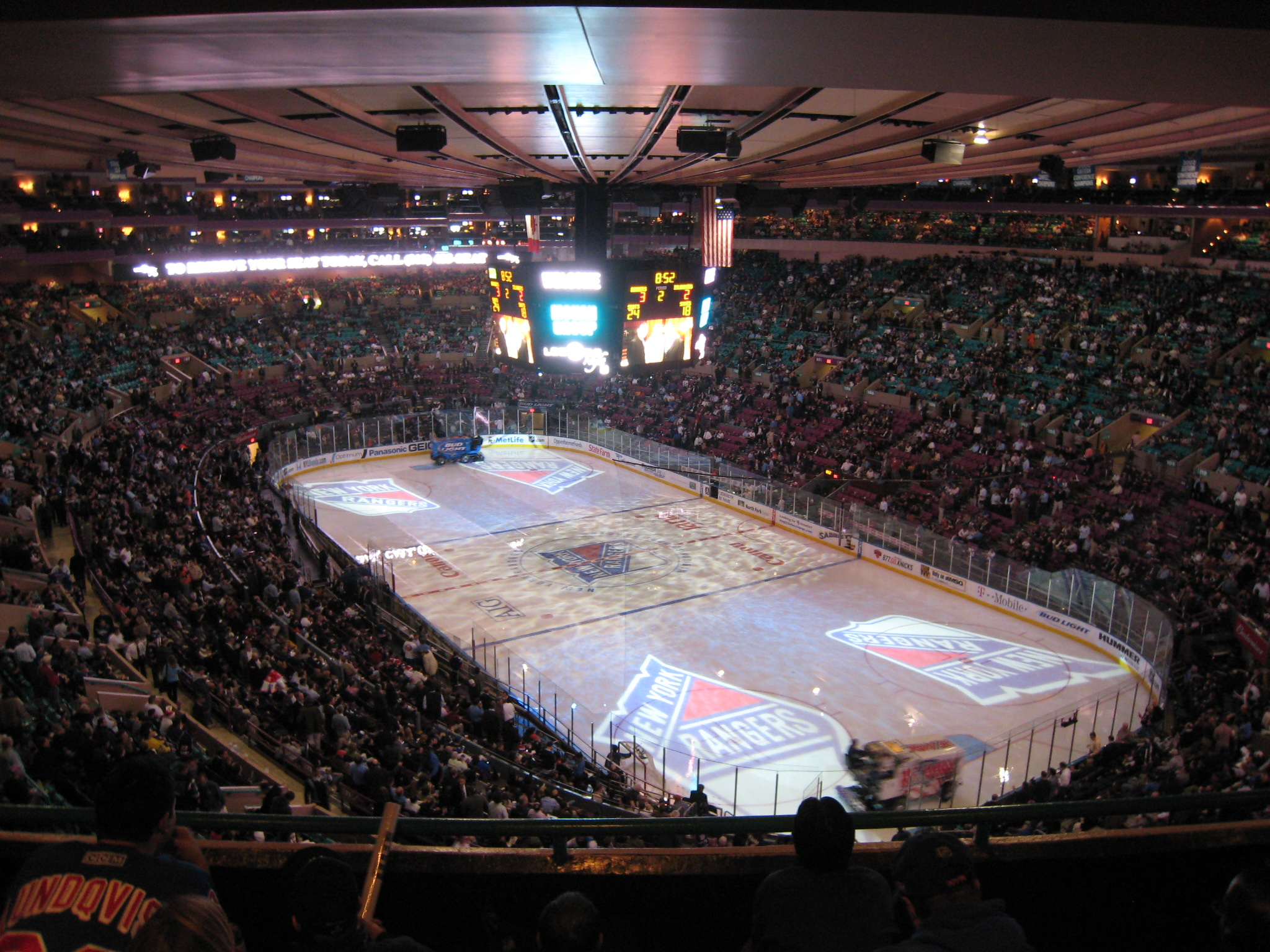
The North American leg of the Drama tour included three consecutive sold-out performances at Madison Square Garden in New York City.

Although promotional marketing for the tour largely omitted mention of the line-up modifications, the North American leg was commercially successful. The itinerary included three consecutive sold-out performances at Madison Square Garden in New York City, where the band received a commemorative gold ticket award marking their 16th consecutive sell-out at the arena since 1974. Conversely, the British leg was met with vocal hostility; numerous audience members openly rejected the line-up adjustments, frequently booing and jeering Horn and Downes during performances.

=== Aftermath ===
Following the conclusion of the tour, Yes officially disbanded in early 1981. Horn subsequently pivoted toward a full-time career in record production, which eventually led to him producing the band's major commercial comeback album, 90125 (1983). Concurrently, Howe and Downes collaborated to co-found the commercially successful supergroup Asia.

Yes did not perform any material from Drama live for nearly three decades, avoiding the tracks entirely until Anderson permanently departed the touring group in 2008. For their 2016 European tour, the band revived the album to perform it live in its entirety for the first time, matching the original LP track listing order. During the Oxford and London dates of the tour, Horn joined the band on stage at the Royal Albert Hall as a guest performer to sing lead vocals on "Tempus Fugit". The Drama line-up conceptually unified in the 2010s; Horn produced the band's twentieth studio album, Fly from Here (2011), which featured Downes, Howe, Squire, and White, and later re-recorded the lead vocals himself for the 2018 revised edition, Fly from Here – Return Trip.

== Track listing ==
All tracks are written by Geoff Downes, Trevor Horn, Steve Howe, Chris Squire and Alan White, except where noted.

Side one
| No. | Title | Length |
|---|---|---|
| 1. | "Machine Messiah" | 10:25 |
| 2. | "White Car (Note: The title "Man in a White Car" is also used, particularly on streaming services and in the lyrics sheet included on some of the original LP releases.)" | 1:21 |
| 3. | "Does It Really Happen?" | 6:33 |
| Total length: | | 18:21 |

Side two
| No. | Title | Length |
|---|---|---|
| 1. | "Into the Lens" | 8:33 |
| 2. | "Run Through the Light" | 4:42 |
| 3. | "Tempus Fugit" | 5:16 |
| Total length: | | 18:33 |

2004 CD reissue bonus tracks
| No. | Title | Writer(s) | Length |
|---|---|---|---|
| 7. | "Into the Lens (I Am a Camera)" (Single version) | | 3:47 |
| 8. | "Run Through the Light" (Single version) | | 4:31 |
| 9. | "Have We Really Got to Go Through This (Note: Reworked as "Go Through This" and performed on the Drama tour. A live recording is included on The Word is Live.)" | Howe, Squire, White | 3:43 |
| 10. | "Song No. 4 (Satellite) (Note: Reworked by Squire and White with XYZ as "Telephone Secrets" (also known as "Telephone Lies").)" | Howe, Squire, White | 7:31 |
| 11. | "Tempus Fugit" (Tracking session) | | 5:39 |
| 12. | "White Car" (Tracking session) | | 1:11 |
| 13. | "Dancing Through the Light (Note: Early version of "Run Through the Light", with an earlier draft of lyrics and unused keyboard parts.)" | Jon Anderson, Howe, Squire, Rick Wakeman, White | 3:16 |
| 14. | "Golden Age (Note: Wakeman reworked some of his parts for the solo song "Maybe '80" on Rock 'n' Roll Prophet. Anderson did the same for the solo song "Some are Born" on Song of Seven.)" | Anderson, Howe, Squire, Wakeman, White | 5:57 |
| 15. | "In the Tower" | Anderson, Howe, Squire, Wakeman, White | 2:54 |
| 16. | "Friend of a Friend" | Anderson, Howe, Squire, Wakeman, White | 3:38 |
| Total length: | | | 1:18:37 (78:37) |

== Personnel ==
Credits are adapted from the 1980 and 1994 issues of the album and other sources

Yes

- Trevor Horn – lead vocals, fretless bass on "Run Through the Light", acoustic guitar on "Machine Messiah"
- Steve Howe – Gibson Les Paul on "Machine Messiah" and "Run Through the Light", Gibson Les Paul Gold Top on "Does It Really Happen?", Fender Console pedal steel guitar and Fender Telecaster on "Into the Lens", Martin mandolin on "Run Through the Light", Fender Stratocaster on "Tempus Fugit", backing vocals
- Chris Squire – bass guitar (except "Run Through the Light"), piano on "Run Through the Light", backing vocals, lead vocals on “Does It Really Happen?”
- Geoff Downes – keyboards, Fairlight CMI, vocoder on "Into the Lens" and "Tempus Fugit"
- Alan White – drums, percussion, backing vocals

Production

- Sandy Campbell, Jim Halley, Phil Straight – co-ordination
- George Chambers – tape operator
- David Clarke – inside cover photography
- Sean Davis (Strawberry Studios) – mastering engineer
- Roger Dean – cover painting
- Magnetic Storm – cover design
- Joe Gastwirt (Ocean View Digital) – remastering engineer (1994 issue)
- Eddy Offord – producer (backing tracks)
- Hugh Padgham (Townhouse), Gary Langan and Julian Mendelsohn (SARM East), Ashley Howe (Roundhouse), Pete Schwier (RAK) – recording engineers

== Charts ==
| Chart (1980) | Peak position |
|---|---|
| Australian Albums (Kent Music Report) | 69 |
| Canada Top Albums/CDs (RPM) | 41 |
| Dutch Albums (Album Top 100) | 18 |
| French Albums (SNEP) | 21 |
| German Albums (Offizielle Top 100) | 50 |
| Japanese Albums (Oricon) | 78 |
| New Zealand Albums (RMNZ) | 44 |
| Norwegian Albums (VG-lista) | 11 |
| Swedish Albums (Sverigetopplistan) | 19 |
| UK Albums (Official Charts) | 2 |
| US Billboard 200 | 18 |

== Certifications ==
| Region | Certification | Certified units/sales |
|---|---|---|
| United Kingdom (BPI) | Silver | 60,000^{^} |
^{^} Shipments figures based on certification alone.
