= Paul Dean =

Paul Dean may refer to:

- Paul Dean (minister) (1789–1860), American universalist minister
- Paul Dean (baseball) (1912–1981), American baseball pitcher
- Paul Dean, Baron Dean of Harptree (1924–2009), British Conservative politician
- Paul Dean (guitarist) (born 1946), Canadian guitarist and co-producer for Loverboy
- Paul Dean (rugby union) (born 1960), Irish international rugby union player
- Paul Dean (clarinetist) (born 1966), Australian clarinetist from Southern Cross Soloists
- A stage name once used by the British musician and actor Paul Nicholas
- A character in the 1982 film Parasite

== See also ==
- Paula Deen (born 1947), American chef, cookbook author, and TV personality
