= Ralph A. Dean =

Ralph A. Dean is a phytopathologist.

Dean earned a bachelor's of science degree from the University of London in 1980 and completed his doctorate at the University of Kentucky in 1986. Upon completing postdoctoral research at the University of Georgia, Dean joined the Clemson University faculty. He left Clemson for North Carolina State University in 1999, where he was appointed William Neal Reynolds distinguished professor in plant pathology in 2005. He was elected a fellow of the American Phytopathological Society in 2006. In 2017, Dean became chief editor of the journal Molecular Plant Pathology.
