= Michael Lee Dean =

Michael Lee Dean (born in Dallas, Texas) is an American clarinetist and university professor.

He studied at the University of Texas at Arlington, the University of Colorado at Boulder, and Texas Tech University. He teaches at the Earl and Margie Holland School of Visual and Performing Arts at Southeast Missouri State University. He has performed and taught at a number of institutions in the United States and England including the Royal Northern College of Music, the Eastman School of Music, California State University Northridge, California State University Long Beach, and the University of North Texas. Michael Dean has lectured at the Clarinet Fest, Music Educators National Convention, and the Texas Music Educators National Association clinic and convention. He is the president of the National Association of Collegiate Wind and Percussion Instructors (NACWPI).

== Discography ==
- Desertscape: New Music for Clarinet
- Red Mesa Trio, LMB Resources, 2000.

== Books and articles ==
- Clarinet on Campus
- Preparation and Effort: Tips on Applying John Wooden's Concepts, NACWPI Journal, 2009.
- Business Masterclass: Applying to Graduate School, Windplayer Magazine.
- Building ARTC Musicians Approach, in the column It Works for Me, Southwestern Musician.
