= Senator Dean =

Senator Dean may refer to:

- Ashbel A. Dean (1857–1899), Vermont State Senate
- Benjamin Dean (1824–1897), Massachusetts State Senate
- Charles Dean (politician) (1939–2026), Florida State Senate
- Eliab B. Dean Jr. (1819–1900), Wisconsin State Senate
- Josiah Dean (1748–1818), Massachusetts State Senate
- Lynn Dean (1923–2022), Louisiana State Senate
- Nathan Dean (1934–2013), Georgia State Senate
- Robert Aaron Dean (1836–1912), Mississippi State Senate
- Robert P. Dean (1909–1984), Maryland State Senate
- Robert W. Dean (1923–1999), Wisconsin State Senate
- Roscoe E. Dean (1936–2016), Georgia State Senate
- Sidney Dean (1818–1901), Rhode Island Senate

== See also ==
- Charles B. Deane Jr. (1937–2022), North Carolina State Senate
- Gilbert A. Deane (1851–1891), New York State Senate
