= Mark Dean =

Mark Dean may refer to:

- Mark Dean (computer scientist) (born 1957), American inventor and computer engineer
- Mark Dean (footballer) (born 1964), English soccer player
- Mark Dean (swimmer) (born 1967), USA Olympic team member in 1988
- Mark Dean (American football) (1917–2006), American football player and coach
- Mark Dean (basketball) (born 1971), Bahamian basketball player
- Mark Dean (politician) (born 1980), American politician from West Virginia
- Mark Dean, player of Noo-Noo in Teletubbies
