= Thomas Deane (priest) =

Irish-based Anglican priest (1645–1713)

Thomas Deane (1645–1713) was an Anglican priest in Ireland in the second half of the 17th century and the first two decades of the eighteenth.

Deane was born in Cardiff and educated at Trinity College, Dublin. He was appointed Prebendary of Clonamery in Kilkenny Cathedral in 1671; Treasurer of Waterford Cathedral in 1687; and Dean of Cloyne in 1704; and held all three positions until his death.
