= Arthur Dean (cricketer) =

Australian cricketer (1931–2018)

Personal information
- Full name: Arthur Edgar Dean
- Born: 23 July 1931; Melbourne, Australia
- Died: 2018 (aged 86–87)
- Batting: Right-handed
- Bowling: Right-arm fast-medium

Domestic team information
- Years: Team
- 1953–1957: Victoria
- Source: Cricinfo, 2 December 2015

Arthur Edgar Dean (23 July 1931 – 2018) was an Australian cricketer. He played five first-class cricket matches for Victoria between 1953 and 1957. He played for Footscray in Melbourne District Cricket. and Williamstown.
