= Kevin Dean =

Kevin Dean may refer to:

- Kevin Dean (cricketer) (born 1976), English cricketer
- Kevin Dean (ice hockey) (born 1969), American ice hockey player
- Kevin Dean (musician) (born 1971), drummer for Brand New Sin
