= Hawking's time traveller party =

Experimental event organised by Stephen Hawking

Coordinates: 52°12′21″N 0°7′4.7″E

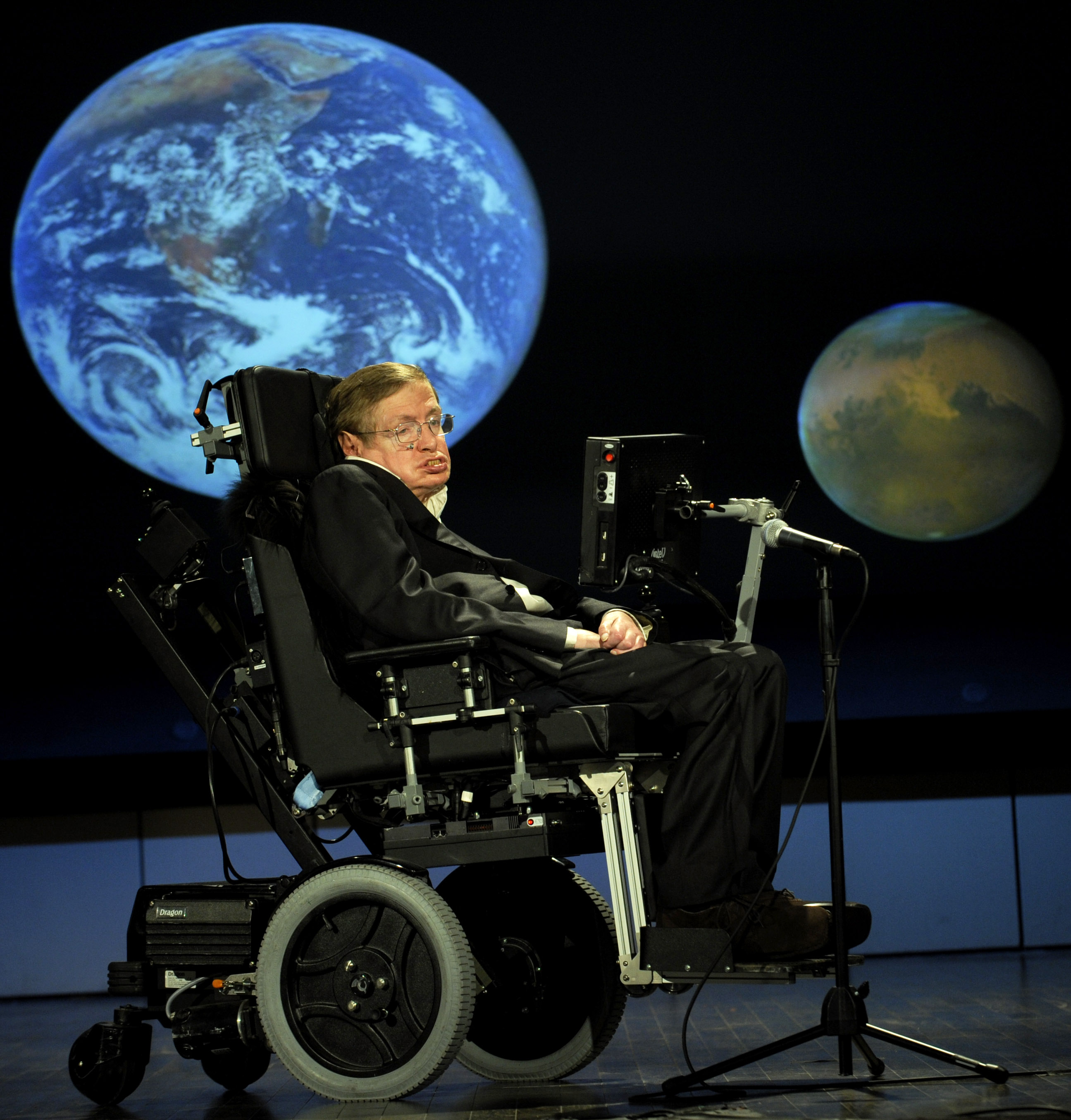
Stephen Hawking in 2008.

On 28 June 2009, British astrophysicist Stephen Hawking held a reception for time travellers at the University of Cambridge. The physicist arranged for balloons, champagne, and nibbles for his guests, but did not send out the invitations until the following day, after the party was over.

The party was held at Gonville and Caius College on Trinity Street (52° 12' 21" N, 0° 7' 4.7" E) at 12:00 UT on 28 June 2009, a few months before Hawking's retirement. In preparing for the event, Hawking said he hoped that copies of the invitation might survive for thousands of years, and that "one day someone living in the future will find the information and use a wormhole time machine to come back to my party, proving that time travel will one day be possible".

Invitations say that the reader is "cordially invited to a reception for Time Travellers" and that there was "no RSVP required". Hawking waited in the room for a few hours before leaving, and no visitors arrived. He regarded the event as "experimental evidence that time travel is not possible".

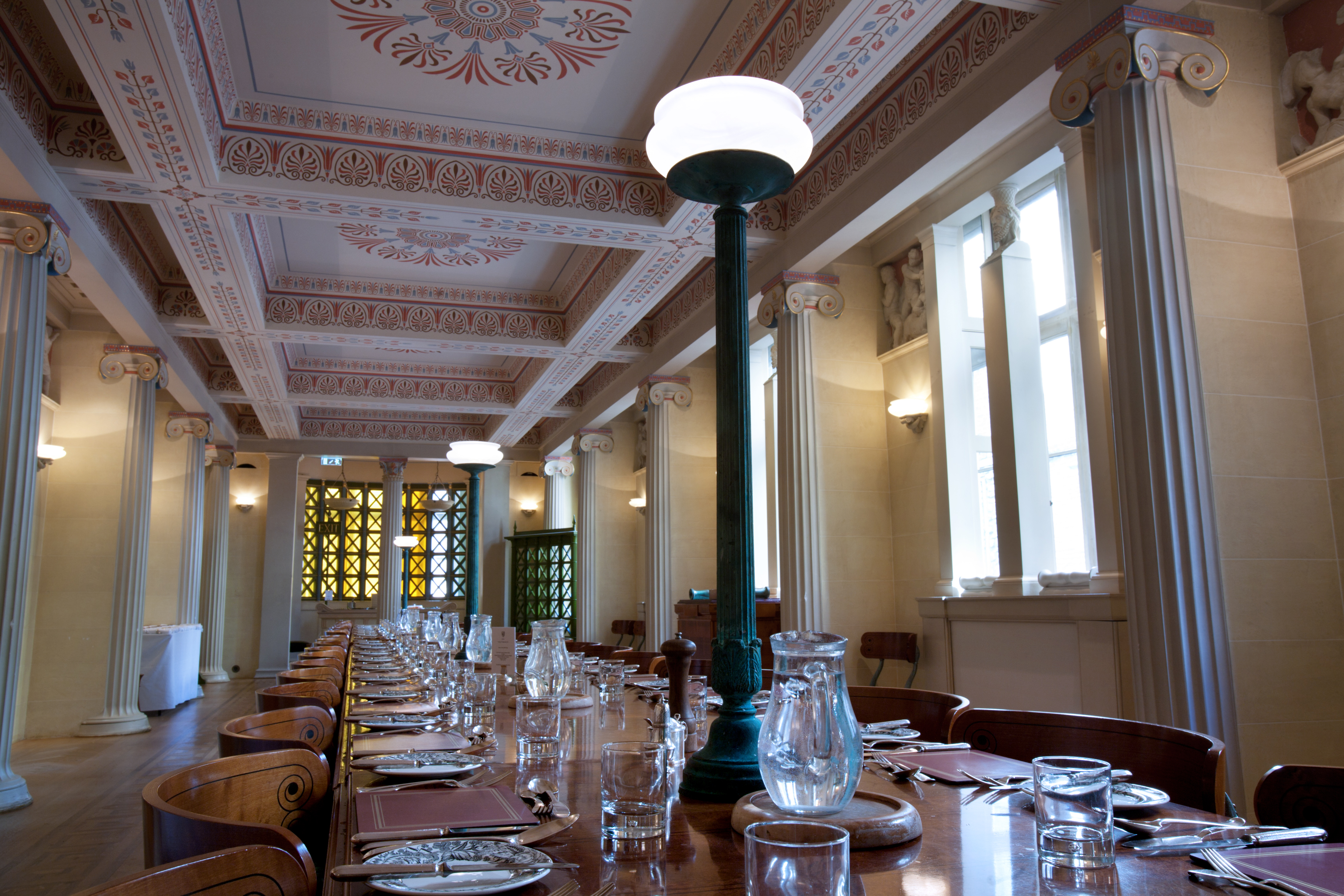
The event was held at Gonville and Caius College, University of Cambridge (interior pictured).

Possible proposed explanations for no attendees include:

- Time travel to 2009 is impossible or never achieved by humanity.
- Going back in time creates a parallel timeline that has no impact on the original.
- Records of the party are lost.
- Time travellers receive the invitation and decide not to attend.

During a ballot for public places at Hawking's funeral in 2018, his estate allowed people with dates of birth as late as 31 December 2038 to register for tickets, saying that they "cannot exclude the possibility of time travel".

== Video ==
- Stephen Hawking – Time Traveller's Party on YouTube
