= Tommy Deans =

Scottish footballer

Personal information
- Full name: Thomas Sneddon Deans
- Date of birth: 7 January 1922
- Place of birth: Shieldhill, Scotland
- Date of death: 30 December 2000 (aged 78)
- Place of death: Nottingham, England
- Position: Full back

Senior career*
Years	Team	Apps	(Gls)
- Armadale Thistle
1947–1949	Clyde	45	(0)
1949–1956	Notts County	239	(0)
- Boston United
Total		284	(0)

International career
1948	Scottish League XI	1	(0)
- * Club domestic league appearances and goals

Tommy Deans (7 January 1922 – 30 December 2000) was a Scottish professional footballer who played as a full back.

== Career ==
Born in Shieldhill, Falkirk, Deans played for Armadale Thistle, Clyde, Notts County and Boston United.
