= Roger Dean =

Roger Dean may refer to:

- Roger Dean (artist) (born 1944)
- Roger Dean (politician) (1913–1998)
- Roger Dean (footballer) (born 1940), Australian rules footballer
- Roger Dean (musician) (born 1948), British-Australian jazz pianist
- Roger Dean Stadium, baseball stadium, Florida
- Roger Kingsley Dean, jailed for the 2011 Quakers Hill Nursing Home fire in which 11 died
