= Michael Dean (cricketer) =

English cricketer

Personal information
- Full name: Michael Matthew Dean
- Born: 7 June 1972 (age 54); Sutton Coldfield, Warwickshire, England
- Batting: Right-handed
- Bowling: Right-arm medium

Domestic team information
- Years: Team
- 2002: Warwickshire Cricket Board

Career statistics
Competition	LA
Matches	1
Runs scored	8
Batting average	–
100s/50s	–/–
Top score	8*
Balls bowled	54
Wickets	–
Bowling average	–
5 wickets in innings	–
10 wickets in match	–
Best bowling	–
Catches/stumpings	–/–
- Source: Cricinfo, 25 October 2010

Michael Matthew Dean (born 7 June 1972) is an English cricketer. Dean is a right-handed batsman who bowls right-arm medium pace. He was born at Sutton Coldfield, Warwickshire.

Dean represented the Warwickshire Cricket Board in a single List A match against Herefordshire in the 1st round of the 2003 Cheltenham & Gloucester Trophy which was held in 2002. In his only List A match, he scored an unbeaten 8 runs.
