= Unveil the Mystery =

2013 compilation album by Mystery

Compilation album by Mystery
- Released: August 2013 (Digital); December 31, 2013 (CD)
- Genre: Progressive rock
- Length: 66:21
- Label: Unicorn Digital
- Producer: Michel St-Père

Mystery chronology
At the Dawn of a New Millennium (2000)	Unveil the Mystery (2013)

Unveil the Mystery is the second compilation album by the Canadian progressive rock band Mystery. While At the Dawn of a New Millennium features lead vocals by Gary Savoie, Unveil The Mystery features lead vocals by Benoît David. The cover art for the album was originally going to be the cover art for Beneath the Veil of Winter's Face.

== Track listing ==
No.	Title	Writer(s)	Original Album	Length
1.	"As I Am"	Michel St-Père	Beneath the Veil of Winter's Face	5:37
2.	"Wolf"	Michel St-Père, Benoît David	One Among the Living	5:37
3.	"Dear Someone"	Michel St-Père, Benoît David	The World is a Game	6:21
4.	"Beneath the Veil of Winter's Face"	Michel St-Père	Beneath the Veil of Winter's Face	5:48
5.	"Pride"	Michel St-Père	The World is a Game	11:27
6.	"The Sailor and the Mermaid"	Michel St-Père	Beneath the Veil of Winter's Face	5:29
7.	"One Among the Living"	Michel St-Père	One Among the Living	6:27
8.	"Time Goes By"	Michel St-Père	The World is a Game	6:05
9.	"Travel to the Night"	Michel St-Père, Dré	Beneath the Veil of Winter's Face	8:34
10.	"Sailing on a Wing"	Michel St-Père	One Among the Living	4:56

== Release information ==
- CD - Unicorn Digital - UNCR-5095 - 2013
