= At the Dawn of a New Millennium =

2000 compilation album by Mystery

Compilation album by Mystery
- Released: 2000
- Genre: Progressive rock
- Length: 70:31
- Label: Unicorn Records
- Producer: Michel St-Père

Mystery chronology
At the Dawn of a New Millennium (2000)	Unveil the Mystery (2013)

At the Dawn of a New Millennium is the first compilation album by the Canadian progressive rock band Mystery. Released in 2000, it contains music from Mystery's first three studio releases, featuring Gary Savoie as lead vocalist on all tracks. At the Dawn of a New Millennium was remastered and reissued in 2013.

== Track listing ==
No.	Title	Writer(s)	Original Album	Length
1.	"Destiny?"	Michel St-Père	Destiny?	5:00
2.	"Theatre of the Mind"	Michel St-Père	Theatre of the Mind	6:04
3.	"Before the Dawn"	Michel St-Père, Gary Savoie	Destiny?	6:28
4.	"In my Dreams"	Michel St-Père	Theatre of the Mind	5:27
5.	"Black Roses"	Michel St-Père	Theatre of the Mind	8:05
6.	"The Inner Journey (Part II)"	Michel St-Père	Theatre of the Mind	4:33
7.	"Cinderella"	Michel St-Père	Mystery	7:20
8.	"The Mourning Man"	Michel St-Père	Destiny?	4:46
9.	"Submerged"	Michel St-Père, Dré	Destiny?	7:53
10.	"Shadow of the Lake"	Michel St-Père, Dré	Destiny?	14:55

== Release information ==
- CD - Unicorn Records - UNCR-2040 - 2000
- CD - Unicorn Digital - UNCR-5085 - 2013
