= Tales from the Netherlands =

2013 live album by Mystery

Live album by Mystery
- Released: October 1, 2014
- Recorded: May 10, 2013
- Genre: Progressive rock
- Length: 107:43
- Label: Unicorn Digital
- Producer: Michel St-Père

Mystery chronology
Tales from the Netherlands (2014)	Second Home (2017)

Tales from the Netherlands is a double live album by the Canadian progressive rock band Mystery.

== Overview ==
The album was recorded during the tour supporting the album The World is a Game at Cultuurpodium Boerderij in Zoetermeer, Netherlands on May 10, 2013 and was the band's first European concert. The recording is made up of songs from the three albums released during Benoît David's time in the band: Beneath the Veil of Winter's Face, One Among the Living and The World is a Game. It is the last album David recorded with the band before leaving in autumn 2013.

== Cover art ==
The cover art is the creation of Polish photographer Leszek Bujnowski, who also created the cover for The World is a Game and Delusion Rain, and is entitled Lost.

== Track listing ==
Disc one

No.	Title	Writer(s)	Length
1.	"Unveil the Mystery"	Michel St-Père	1:27
2.	"As I Am"	Michel St-Père	5:49
3.	"Dear Someone"	Michel St-Père, Benoît David	6:52
4.	"Sailing on a Wing"	Michel St-Père	5:00
5.	"Wolf"	Michel St-Père, Benoît David	5:38
6.	"Another Day"	Michel St-Père	19:24

Disc two

No.	Title	Writer(s)	Length
1.	"Pride"	Michel St-Père	12:19
2.	"Through Different Eyes"	Michel St-Père	22:16
3.	"Time Goes By"	Michel St-Père	6:44
4.	"Travel to the Night"	Michel St-Père, Dré	9:26
5.	"The Preacher's Fall"	Michel St-Père	4:58
6.	"Between Love and Hate"	Michel St-Père	7:50

== Personnel ==
- Benoît David - lead vocals
- Michel St-Père - electric guitar, backing vocals
- Benoît Dupuis - keyboards, backing vocals
- Sylvain Moineau - electric and acoustic guitars, backing vocals
- François Fournier - bass guitar, Moog Taurus, backing vocals
- Jean-Sébastien Goyette - drums, backing vocals

== Release information ==
- CD - Unicorn Digital - UNCR-5100 - 2014
