= Lies and Butterflies =

2018 studio album by Mystery

Studio album by Mystery
- Released: July 14, 2018
- Genre: Symphonic rock; hard rock; progressive rock
- Length: 64:06
- Label: Unicorn Digital
- Producer: Michel St-Père

Mystery chronology
Delusion Rain (2015)	Lies and Butterflies (2018)	Redemption (2023)

Lies and Butterflies is the seventh studio album by the Canadian rock band Mystery, released in July 2018 on Unicorn Digital.

The studio lineup for the band remained unchanged from their previous album Delusion Rain, with the exception of the departure of keyboardist Benoît Dupuis in 2016 who was succeeded by Antoine Michaud, guitarist in the live band in 2014 and a session musician on Delusion Rain.

== Production ==
=== Album title ===
The title of the album went through several changes before it was finally decided to call it Lies and Butterflies. The album had at least two titles before the working title of Butterfly was suggested, which was also the working title for the song "Chrysalis". Chrysalis was the next working title considered, and when the decision was made not to name the album Chrysalis, the track "Butterfly" was subsequently renamed to "Chrysalis". Eventually, the ultimate title was proposed by drummer Jean-Sébastien Goyette and finalized on the same day.

=== Songs ===
The first track "Looking for Something Else" opens with the sound of applause and cheering from an audience, which is a recording taken from the end of the band's previous live release Second Home and is intended to act as a continuation.

The fifth track on the album, "Dare to Dream" is the second song in Mystery's catalog for which St-Père does not have a writing credit, the first being "Virtual Mentality" on Theatre of the Mind written by former keyboardist Benoît Dupuis. The music on "Dare to Dream" was written by Pageau, his first writing credit on a Mystery song, with the lyrics written by Hans Raffelt and Pageau. The song was written many years prior and was one of the tracks considered for Delusion Rain but ultimately it was decided to not release the song at that time.

Guitarist Sylvain Moineau wrote the music for the sixth song on the album "Where Dreams Come Alive" and St-Père wrote the lyrics. It is the first songwriting credit for Moineau on a Mystery album.

The closing track "Chrysalis" saw its beginnings approximately twenty-five years before the release of the album when St-Père wrote the beginning and main parts of the song.

=== Cover art ===
The cover art for the album was created by photographer Julie de Waroquier and is entitled Bad News.

== Release ==
Professional ratings
Review scores
Source	Rating
Teraz Rock	4/5 stars
Voir	3.5/5 stars

Lies and Butterflies was released on July 14, 2018, the same day the band played in the Night of the Prog Festival in Germany. The album was released on vinyl by Polish label Oskar Records, who previously released Mystery's The World is a Game and Delusion Rain on vinyl.

The album reached number 12 on the Official Charts Official Independent Album Breakers Chart Top 20 and number 25 on the Official Rock & Metal Albums Chart Top 40 for the week of August 24 through August 30, 2018.

== Track listing ==
No.	Title	Lyrics	Music	Length
1.	"Looking for Something Else"	Michel St-Père	Michel St-Père	16:54
2.	"Come to Me"	Michel St-Père	Michel St-Père	5:17
3.	"How do you Feel?"	Michel St-Père	Michel St-Père	4:53
4.	"Something to Believe in"	Michel St-Père	Michel St-Père	7:34
5.	"Dare to Dream"	Hans Raffelt, Jean Pageau	Jean Pageau	6:54
6.	"Where Dreams Come Alive"	Michel St-Père	Sylvain Moineau	7:26
7.	"Chrysalis"	Michel St-Père	Michel St-Père	15:08

Vinyl additional tracks
No.	Title	Writer(s)	Length
8.	"The Last Glass Of Wine (live)" (recorded April 3rd 2016 at Cultuurpodium Boerderij)	Michel St-Père	6:44
9.	"If You See Her (live)" (recorded April 3rd 2016 at Cultuurpodium Boerderij)	Michel St-Père	6:01
10.	"Wall Street King (live)" (recorded April 3rd 2016 at Cultuurpodium Boerderij)	Michel St-Père	6:30

== Personnel ==
- Jean Pageau - vocals, keyboards, flute
- Michel St-Père - electric and acoustic guitars, keyboards
- François Fournier - bass guitar, Taurus pedals, keyboards
- Sylvain Moineau - guitars, keyboards
- Jean-Sébastien Goyette - drums
- Antoine Michaud - keyboards

== Release information ==
- CD - Unicorn Digital - UNCR-5120 - 2018
- Vinyl - Oskar - 008/009LP - 2018
