= List of Mystery concert tours =

Mystery, a Canadian rock band, has been playing concerts for much of their career. Early shows took place in their home country and in 2013 they played their first European show at Cultuurpodium Boerderij in the Netherlands. Some dates between 1989 and 1998 may be missing.

== Raymond Savoie concerts ==
Date	Venue	City	Country	Notes
19?	Aréna Ste-Julie	Sainte-Julie	Canada	
23 October 1990	Club Soda	Montreal	Canada	Labatt's Blue Band Warz

== Gary Savoie concerts ==
Date	Venue	City	Country	Notes
14–17 March 1994	Auditorium d'Armand-Corbeil	Terrebonne	Canada	Festival Rock d'Armand-Corbeil
18 May 1994	Whiskey's Rock Bar	Saint-Leonard	Canada	Yamaha MusicQuest '94
13 November 1994	Jailhouse Rock Café	Montreal	Canada	With a guest
21 January 1995	Jailhouse Rock Café	Montreal	Canada	With a guest
18 March 1995	La Pleine Lune	Boucherville	Canada	La Relève 1995
31 March 1995	Auditorium d'Armand-Corbeil	Terrebonne	Canada	Mystery headline
11 May 1995	Whiskey's Rock Bar	Saint-Leonard	Canada	With Proof in Spirits and a guest
23 March 1996	Le Grand Café	Montreal	Canada	Mystery headline
1 June 1996	Le Grand Café	Montreal	Canada	Mystery headline
9 November 1998	Club Soda	Montreal	Canada	Opening for Oryzhein
1 December 1998	Le Maquisart	Trois-Rivières	Canada	With Oryzhein

== Benoît David concerts ==
=== Early concerts ===
Date	Venue	City	Country	Notes	Setlist
3 April 2009	Centre Bell	Montreal	Canada	Opening for The Musical Box	Setlist: As I Am; Queen of Vajra Space; Destiny?; Travel to the Night; The Preacher's Fall
11 September 2009	Le Gesù	Montreal	Canada	FMPM 2009	Setlist: As I Am; Queen of Vajra Space; The Third Dream; One Among the Living; Destiny?; Tom Sawyer (Rush Cover); Snowhite; Travel to the Night; The Preacher's Fall
23 October 2009	La Place à Côté	Montreal	Canada	Mystery headline	Setlist: As I Am; Queen of Vajra Space; Snowhite; One Among the Living; Beneath the Veil of Winter's Face; Hey You (Pink Floyd Cover); The Third Dream; The Sailor and the Mermaid; Destiny?; The Preacher's Fall; Travel to the Night; The Scarlet Eye; Sailing on a Wing
30 April 2010	Majestic Theater	Gettysburg	United States	Rites of Spring Festival 2010	Setlist: As I Am; Queen of Vajra Space; Wolf; The Third Dream; Through Different Eyes; Travel to the Night; One Among the Living; Sailing on a Wing; Shadow of the Lake; The Preacher's Fall
22 May 2010	L'Olympia	Montreal	Canada	Double bill with Hamadryad	Setlist: As I Am; Queen of Vajra Space; Wolf; The Third Dream; Through Different Eyes; Travel to the Night; One Among the Living; Sailing on a Wing; Shadow of the Lake; The Preacher's Fall
28 September 2010	Théâtre Hector-Charland	L'Assomption	Canada	Hommage à Sylvain Gagné	Setlist: (Mystery played two songs for a special fund raising/tribute event); Sailing on a Wing; Tom Sawyer (Rush Cover)

=== The World is a Game Tour ===
Date	Venue	City	Country	Notes	Setlist
9 August 2012	Théâtre Corona	Montreal	Canada	Opening for Saga	Setlist: As I Am; Wolf; Pride; Travel to the Night; Sailing on a Wing; The Preacher's Fall
10 November 2012	Impérial de Québec	Quebec City	Canada	Opening for Arena	Setlist: As I Am; Wolf; Intro (The World is a Game); Dear Someone; Kameleon Man; Travel to the Night; Pride; Sailing on a Wing; The Preacher's Fall
19 January 2013	Théâtre Hector-Charland	L'Assomption	Canada	Double bill with The Box	Setlist: As I Am; Wolf; Intro (The World is a Game); Dear Someone; Kameleon Man; Travel to the Night; Pride; Another Day; Sailing on a Wing; The Preacher's Fall
7 February 2013	Centrepointe Theatre	Ottawa	Canada	Opening for Saga	Setlist: Pride; Dear Someone; Wolf; Another Day; Travel to the Night; Sailing on a Wing
22 March 2013	L'Olympia	Montreal	Canada	Marillion Weekend 2013	Setlist: As I Am; Pride; Dear Someone; Sailing on a Wing; Travel to the Night; The Preacher's Fall
6 April 2013	Teatro del Estado	Mexicali	Mexico	Baja Prog 2013	Setlist: As I Am; Pride; Dear Someone; Sailing on a Wing; Another Day; Between Love and Hate; Travel to the Night; Through Different Eyes; The Preacher's Fall
10 May 2013	Cultuurpodium Boerderij	Zoetermeer	Netherlands	Mystery headline, CD release	Setlist: Set 1; As I Am; Dear Someone; Sailing on a Wing; Wolf; Another Day; Set 2; Pride; Through Different Eyes; Time Goes By; Travel to the Night; The Preacher's Fall; Encore; Between Love and Hate; Shadow of the Lake
12 May 2013	The Hippodrome	Kingston upon Thames	England	Celebr8.2	Setlist: As I Am; Pride; Dear Someone; Through Different Eyes; Travel to the Night; Time Goes By; Shadow of the Lake; The Preacher's Fall
25 May 2013	Sound Academy	Toronto	Canada	Opening for Saga	Setlist: As I Am; Wolf; Pride; Dear Someone; Travel to the Night; Sailing on a Wing

== Jean Pageau concerts ==
=== The World is a Game Tour Leg Two ===
Date	Venue	City	Country	Notes	Setlist
15 August 2014	The Brass Monkey	Ottawa	Canada	Mystery headline	Setlist: Set 1; The Third Dream; Dear Someone; Wolf; As I Am; Between Love and Hate; Travel to the Night; Another Day; Set 2; Pride; Time Goes By; Through Different Eyes; The Sailor and the Mermaid; The Awakening; Destiny?; The Preacher's Fall; Encore; Sailing on a Wing; Shadow of the Lake
8 September 2014	The Robin 2	Bilston	England	Double bill with DeeExpus	Setlist: The Third Dream; Dear Someone; Wolf; Another Day; Through Different Eyes; Pride; Encore; Travel to the Night; The Sailor and the Mermaid
9 September 2014	The Borderline	London	England	Double bill with DeeExpus	Setlist: The Third Dream; Dear Someone; Wolf; Another Day; Through Different Eyes; Pride; Encore; Travel to the Night
10 September 2014	Real Time Live	Chesterfield	England	Double bill with DeeExpus	Setlist: The Third Dream; Dear Someone; Wolf; Another Day; Through Different Eyes; Pride; Destiny?; The Preacher's Fall; Encore; The Sailor and the Mermaid; Travel to the Night
~~11 September 2014~~ (Note: Canceled due to conflicting travel logistics.)	Riffs Bar	Swindon	England	Mystery headline	
12 September 2014	The Spirit of 66	Verviers	Belgium	Mystery headline	Setlist: The Third Dream; Dear Someone; Wolf; Another Day; The Sailor and the Mermaid; Travel to the Night; Through Different Eyes; Pride; Destiny?; The Preacher's Fall; Encore; Shadow of the Lake; As I Am
13 September 2014	Das Rind	Rüsselsheim	Germany	Progressive Promotion Festival 2014	Setlist: As I Am; Pride; Dear Someone; Wolf; Another Day; Travel to the Night; Through Different Eyes; Encore; Shadow of the Lake
18 September 2014	Bergkeller Reichenbach	Reichenbach	Germany	Opened by Deafening Opera	Setlist: The Third Dream; Pride; Dear Someone; Wolf; Another Day; Travel to the Night; Through Different Eyes; The Awakening; Encore; Destiny?; The Preacher's Fall; Special Request; The Awakening
19 September 2014	Cultuurpodium Boerderij	Zoetermeer	Netherlands	Opened by Minor Giant	Setlist: The Third Dream; Dear Someone; Wolf; The Sailor and the Mermaid; Another Day; The Awakening; Through Different Eyes; Time Goes By; Pride; Destiny?; The Preacher's Fall; Encore; Travel to the Night; Shadow of the Lake
~~25 February 2015~~ (Note: Canceled due to time constraints.)	La Tulipe	Montreal	Canada	Opening for The Neal Morse Band	
26 February 2015	Impérial de Québec	Quebec City	Canada	Opening for The Neal Morse Band	Setlist: Pride (Part 1); Dear Someone; Wolf; Another Day; Travel to the Night; The Preacher's Fall

=== Tour 2015 ===
Date	Venue	City	Country	Notes
26 September 2015	The Brass Monkey	Ottawa	Canada	Opened by Claire Vezina
4 October 2015	The Drill Hall	Chepstow	Wales	Summer's End 2015
9 October 2015	Colos-Saal	Aschaffenburg	Germany	Mystery headline
10 October 2015	Bergkeller Reichenbach	Reichenbach	Germany	Opened by Silhouette
14 October 2015	Boston Music Room	London	England	Double bill with Lifesigns
16 October 2015	The Spirit of 66	Verviers	Belgium	Mystery headline
17 October 2015	Cultuurpodium Boerderij	Zoetermeer	Netherlands	Opened by Silhouette
29 October 2015	Centre d'Art La Chapelle	Quebec City	Canada	Opened by Claire Vezina
8 November 2015	Centre d'Art La Petite Église	Saint-Eustache	Canada	Opened by Claire Vezina

=== Tour 2016 ===
Date	Venue	City	Country	Notes
3 April 2016	Cultuurpodium Boerderij	Zoetermeer	Netherlands	Progdreams V, CD & DVD Release
2 September 2016	Piazzetta della Musica	Veruno	Italy	2Days Prog + 1 2016
2 October 2016	Le Cercle	Quebec City	Canada	Opened by Vecteur K
26 October 2016	The Spirit of 66	Verviers	Belgium	Mystery headline
29 October 2016	Cultuurpodium Boerderij	Zoetermeer	Netherlands	Mystery headline
20 November 2016	Club Soda	Montreal	Canada	Opened by Vecteur K

=== Artrock Festival V Concert ===
Date	Venue	City	Country	Notes
2 April 2017	Neuberinhaus Reichenbach	Reichenbach	Germany	Artrock Festival V

=== Beneath the Veil of Winter's Face 10th Anniversary Tour ===
Date	Venue	City	Country	Notes
~~18 August 2017~~ (Note: Canceled due to logistic and security reasons.)	Esplanade du Concié	Saint-Palais-sur-Mer	France	Festival Crescendo
18 August 2017	The Spirit of 66	Verviers	Belgium	Mystery headline
19 August 2017 (Note: Moved from August 20)	Cultuurpodium Boerderij	Zoetermeer	Netherlands	Mystery headline
22 August 2017	Colos-Saal	Aschaffenburg	Germany	Mystery headline
24 August 2017	Bergkeller Reichenbach	Reichenbach	Germany	Mystery headline
26 August 2017	Teatr Letni	Inowrocław	Poland	Ino-Rock Festival
15 September 2017	Le Cercle	Quebec City	Canada	Mystery headline
23 September 2017	Shenkman Arts Centre	Ottawa	Canada	Mystery headline
30 September 2017	Club Soda	Montreal	Canada	Mystery headline

=== Winter's End Tour 2018 ===
Date	Venue	City	Country	Notes
22 April 2018	The Robin 2	Bilston	England	Triple bill with Midnight Sun and Damian Wilson. (Note: Presto Ballet was originally on the bill but had to postpone and was replaced by Wilson.)
23 April 2018	The Musician	Leicester	England	Triple bill with Midnight Sun and Damian Wilson.
24 April 2018	Boston Music Room	London	England	Triple bill with Midnight Sun and Damian Wilson.
27 April 2018	The Drill Hall	Chepstow	Wales	Winter's End 2018
29 April 2018	Chez Paulette	Pagney-derrière-Barine	France	Mystery headline
1 May 2018	Belleville	Oslo	Norway	Opened by The Windmill
5 May 2018	Auditorio de Peralta	Peralta	Spain	Minnuendö Fest

=== Festivals and the Netherlands ===
Date	Venue	City	Country	Notes
14 July 2018	Freilichtbühne Loreley	Sankt Goarshausen	Germany	Night of the Prog Festival
7 October 2018	Union County Performing Arts Center	Rahway	United States	Progstock Festival
17 November 2018	Cultuurpodium Boerderij	Zoetermeer	Netherlands	Mystery headline, CD & Blu-ray Release

=== Live And Butterflies Tour 2019 ===
Date	Venue	City	Country	Notes
21 March 2019	La Tulipe	Montreal	Canada	Double bill with Frost*
22 March 2019	Salle Jean-Paul-Tardif	Quebec City	Canada	Double bill with Frost*
5 April 2019	Ośrodek Kultury Andaluzja	Piekary Śląskie	Poland	Mystery headline
6 April 2019	MOK Legionowo	Legionowo	Poland	ProgRockFest 2019
7 April 2019	Blue Note Jazz Club	Poznań	Poland	Mystery headline, CD release
9 April 2019	Luxor Live	Arnhem	Netherlands	Opened by Autumn
10 April 2019	Spirit of 66	Verviers	Belgium	Mystery headline
11 April 2019	De Cacaofabriek	Helmond	Netherlands	Mystery headline (Note: The Black Fall was originally the support act but had to cancel.)
12 April 2019	Colos-Saal	Aschaffenburg	Germany	Mystery headline
13 April 2019	Neuberinhaus Reichenbach	Reichenbach	Germany	Artrock Festival VII
Leg 2
17 October 2019	Epic Studios	Norwich	England	Support by The Vagaband
19 October 2019	Cultuurpodium Boerderij	Zoetermeer	Netherlands	Opened by Moonrise
20 October 2019	Die Kantine	Cologne	Germany	Support by Fors
21 October 2019	Meisenfrei Blues Club	Bremen	Germany	Support by Fors
22 October 2019	Musiktheater Piano	Dortmund	Germany	Support by Fors
23 October 2019	Musiktheater Rex	Bensheim	Germany	Mystery headline
24 October 2019	Z7 Konzertfabrik	Pratteln	Switzerland	Support by Fors
26 October 2019	Salle Maurice Leblond	Pierres	France	Prog en Beauce
9 November 2019	Petit Campus	Montreal	Canada	Mystery headline
10 November 2019	LaScène Lebourgneuf	Quebec City	Canada	Mystery headline

=== 2020 concerts ===
Date	Venue	City	Country	Notes
All 2020 concerts cancelled due to COVID-19 pandemic.
~~31 March 2020~~ (Note: Poland concerts canceled due to health risks.)	Ośrodek Kultury Andaluzja	Piekary Śląskie	Poland	With Red Sand
~~1 April 2020~~	Klub u Bazyla	Poznań	Poland	With Red Sand
~~3 April 2020~~ (Note: Canceled due to health and financial risks.)	Neuberinhaus Reichenbach	Reichenbach	Germany	Artrock Festival
~~22 May 2020~~ (Note: Festival canceled due to health risks.)	Grønsand Gjestegård	Sætre	Norway	We Låve Rock Festival
~~23 May 2020~~	Grønsand Gjestegård	Sætre	Norway	We Låve Rock Festival
~~20 June 2020~~ (Note: Festival postponed to June 26th, 2021 due to health risks, then postponed again to June 25, 2022.)	Openluchttheater Valkenburg	Valkenburg aan de Geul	Netherlands	Midsummer Prog Festival
~~19 November 2020~~	Logo	Hamburg	Germany	Mystery headline
~~20 November 2020~~	Musiktheater Piano	Dortmund	Germany	Mystery headline
~~21 November 2020~~	Colos-Saal	Aschaffenburg	Germany	Mystery headline
~~25 November 2020~~	The Spirit of 66	Verviers	Belgium	Mystery headline
~~27 November 2020~~	Luxor Live	Arnhem	Netherlands	Mystery headline
~~28 November 2020~~	Cultuurpodium Boerderij	Zoetermeer	Netherlands	Mystery headline

=== 2022 concerts ===
Date	Venue	City	Country	Notes
24 June 2022	Colos-Saal	Aschaffenburg	Germany	Mystery headline
25 June 2022	Openlucht Amphitheater	Valkenburg aan de Geul	Netherlands	Midsummer Prog Festival
5 November 2022	Poppodium Boerderij	Zoetermeer	Netherlands	Mystery headline
7 November 2022	Spirit of 66	Verviers	Belgium	Mystery headline
8 November 2022	Luxor Live	Arnhem	Netherlands	Mystery headline
9 November 2022	Musiktheater Piano	Dortmund	Germany	Mystery headline
10 November 2022	Musiktheater Rex	Bensheim	Germany	Mystery headline
11 November 2022	Poppodium De Pul	Uden	Netherlands	Mystery headline
12 November 2022	Chez Paulette	Pagney-derrière-Barine	France	Mystery headline

=== 2023 concerts ===
Date	Venue	City	Country	Notes
4 March 2023	Salle Dina-Bélanger	Quebec City	Canada	Double bill with Red Sand
18 March 2023	Salle Émile Legault	Montreal	Canada	Double bill with Red Sand
11 April 2023	Melkweg	Amsterdam	Netherlands	Mystery headline
12 April 2023	Poppodium 013	Tilburg	Netherlands	Mystery headline
13 April 2023	Harmonie	Bonn	Germany	Mystery headline
14 April 2023	Colos-Saal	Aschaffenburg	Germany	Mystery headline
15 April 2023	Neuberinhaus Reichenbach	Reichenbach	Germany	Artrock Festival XI
8 October 2023	Williams Center	Rutherford	United States	Progstock Festival
20 October 2023	Salle Dina-Bélanger	Quebec City	Canada	Mystery headline
21 October 2023	Salle Sylvain-Lelièvre	Montreal	Canada	Mystery headline

=== Redemption Tour 2024 ===
Date	Venue	City	Country	Notes
31 May 2024	Salle Jean-Despréz	Gatineau	Canada	Mystery headline
15 June 2024	Poppodium Boerderij	Zoetermeer	Netherlands	Mystery headline
5 July 2024	L’érablière municipale	Saint-Pierre-Baptiste	Canada	Rockfest Saint-Pierre-Baptiste
12 July 2024	SiriusXM stage	Quebec City	Canada	Festival d'été de Québec
28 September 2024	Salle Jean-Michel-Bergot	Sainte-Thérèse	Canada	Mystery headline
2 November 2024	Salle Dina-Bélanger	Quebec City	Canada	Mystery headline
13 November 2024	Cosmopolite Scene	Oslo	Norway	Double bill with Infringement
15 November 2024	De Bosuil	Weert	Netherlands	Mystery headline
16 November 2024	Capsloc	Capelle aan den IJssel	Netherlands	Mystery headline
17 November 2024	Hedon	Zwolle	Netherlands	Mystery headline
18 November 2024	Spirit of 66	Verviers	Belgium	Mystery headline
19 November 2024	Harmonie	Bonn	Germany	Mystery headline
20 November 2024	Colos Saal	Aschaffenburg	Germany	Mystery headline
22 November 2024	2Progi	Poznań	Poland	Mystery headline
23 November 2024	Akademicki Ośrodek Inicjatyw Artystycznych	Łódź	Poland	Mystery headline
24 November 2024	OK Andaluzja	Piekary Śląskie	Poland	Mystery headline

=== Through Different Nights Mystery Weekend ===
Date	Venue	City	Country	Notes
16 May 2025	Poppodium Boerderij	Zoetermeer	Netherlands	Through Different Nights Weekend
17 May 2025	Poppodium Boerderij	Zoetermeer	Netherlands	Through Different Nights Weekend

=== Delusion Rain 10th Anniversary Tour ===
Date	Venue	City	Country	Notes
24 October 2025	The Spirit of 66	Verviers	Belgium	Mystery headline
25 October 2025	Chez Paulette	Pagney-derrière-Barine	France	Mystery headline
26 October 2025	Z7 Konzertfabrik	Pratteln	Switzerland	Mystery headline
28 October 2025	Razzmatazz	Barcelona	Spain	Mystery headline
30 October 2025	Das Rind	Rüsselsheim	Germany	Mystery headline
31 October 2025	Patronaat	Haarlem	Netherlands	Mystery headline
1 November 2025	Poppodium De Pul	Uden	Netherlands	Mystery headline
2 November 2025	TivoliVredenburg	Utrecht	Netherlands	Mystery headline
8 November 2025	Centre d'Art La Petite Église	Saint-Eustache	Canada	Mystery headline
