= Delusion Rain =

2015 studio album by Mystery

Studio album by Mystery
- Released: November 1, 2015
- Genre: Symphonic rock, hard rock, progressive rock
- Length: 61:46
- Label: Unicorn Digital
- Producer: Michel St-Père

Mystery chronology
The World is a Game (2012)	Delusion Rain (2015)	Lies and Butterflies (2018)

Delusion Rain is the sixth studio album by the Canadian rock band Mystery, released in November 2015 on Unicorn Digital. The album features a new studio lineup for the band, with guitarist and keyboardist Michel St-Père, keyboardist Benoît Dupuis, bassist François Fournier, guitarist Sylvain Moineau, drummer Jean-Sébastien Goyette, and singer Jean Pageau.

The album also features two guest musicians: Antoine Michaud on guitars who played guitars for Mystery during their 2014 tour and subsequently became their keyboardist in 2016, and Sylvain Descoteaux who is a member of Huis along with St-Père.

Most of the songs on the album were new compositions, with the exception of "The Willow Tree" and "Wall Street King", which originate from around the time of Theatre of the Mind.

The album reached number 20 on the Official Charts Official Progressive Albums Chart Top 30 for the month of December 23, 2015 through January 26, 2016.

The cover art for the album was created by photographer Leszek Bujnowski, who also created the artwork for The World is a Game and Tales from the Netherlands, and is entitled Delusion Rain.

Professional ratings
Review scores
Source	Rating
Rock Hard	8/10 stars
Teraz Rock	4/5 stars

== Track listing ==
No.	Title	Writer(s)	Length
1.	"Delusion Rain"	Michel St-Père	10:04
2.	"If You See Her"	Michel St-Père	6:11
3.	"The Last Glass of Wine"	Michel St-Père	6:47
4.	"The Willow Tree"	Michel St-Père	19:30
5.	"Wall Street King"	Michel St-Père	6:39
6.	"A Song for You"	Michel St-Père	12:35

Vinyl additional tracks
No.	Title	Writer(s)	Length
7.	"Delusion Rain (live version)" (recorded April 3rd 2016 at Cultuurpodium Boerderij)	Michel St-Père	10:12
8.	"A Song for You (live version)" (recorded April 3rd 2016 at Cultuurpodium Boerderij)	Michel St-Père	12:23

== Personnel ==
Mystery

- Jean Pageau - vocals, keyboards, flute
- Michel St-Père - electric and acoustic guitars, keyboards
- Benoît Dupuis - keyboards
- François Fournier - bass guitar, Taurus pedals, keyboards
- Sylvain Moineau - electric guitar, 12 string acoustic guitar
- Jean-Sébastien Goyette - drums

Additional musicians

- Antoine Michaud - guitars
- Sylvain Descôteaux - piano

== Release information ==
Region	Date	Format	Label	Catalog
Worldwide	November 1, 2015	Digital	Unicorn Digital	UNCR-5110
Germany	November 6, 2015	CD	Unicorn Digital	UNCR-5110
United Kingdom	November 13, 2015	CD	Unicorn Digital	UNCR-5110
Worldwide	November 15, 2015	CD	Unicorn Digital	UNCR-5110
Worldwide	August 26, 2017	Vinyl	Oskar	003/4 LP
