= Mystery (Mystery EP) =

1992 EP by Mystery

EP by Mystery
- Released: May 1992
- Genre: Hard rock, symphonic rock
- Length: 20:34
- Label: PAGI
- Producer: Michel St-Père

Mystery chronology
Mystery (1992)	Theatre of the Mind (1996)

Mystery is the debut EP by the Canadian rock band Mystery, released in 1992. Their shortest recording so far, it contains only 5 tracks. This album is also Mystery's only record that was not released by Unicorn Digital at the time of its original release, and the original 500 print run was out of print for several years until it was remixed and re-released in August 2022 as 1992 - The Lost Tapes.

== Production ==
=== Background ===
In the winter of 1991 Raymond Savoie was replaced as lead vocalist by his brother Gary. "In my Dreams" is the only released track with Raymond singing lead vocals, while the rest of the album features Gary in that role. For the album Theatre of the Mind, "In my Dreams" was re-recorded with Gary singing lead, and the compilation At the Dawn of a New Millennium features the version from Theatre of the Mind.

=== Recording ===
On the 16 track 2 inch master tapes that were digitized for the 30th anniversary edition, one additional song was recorded called "Follow Your Destiny". While the instruments were recorded, no vocals were recorded.

== Track listing ==
No.	Title	Writer(s)	Length
1.	"Dreaming"	Michel St-Père	1:17
2.	"Heart of Stone"	Michel St-Père	3:30
3.	"Never Close your Eyes"	Michel St-Père	3:35
4.	"In my Dreams"	Michel St-Père	4:52
5.	"Cinderella"	Michel St-Père	7:20

== Personnel ==
- Michel St-Père - electric and acoustic guitars, keyboards
- Richard Addison - bass guitar
- Benoît Dupuis - keyboards
- Stéphane Perreault - drums & percussion
- Gary Savoie - vocals (tracks 1–3 and 5)
- Raymond Savoie - vocals (track 4)

== Release information ==
- CD - PAGI Records - MYSC-1001 - 1992
- CD - Unicorn Digital - UNCR-5099 - 2022
