= Benoît David =

Canadian singer

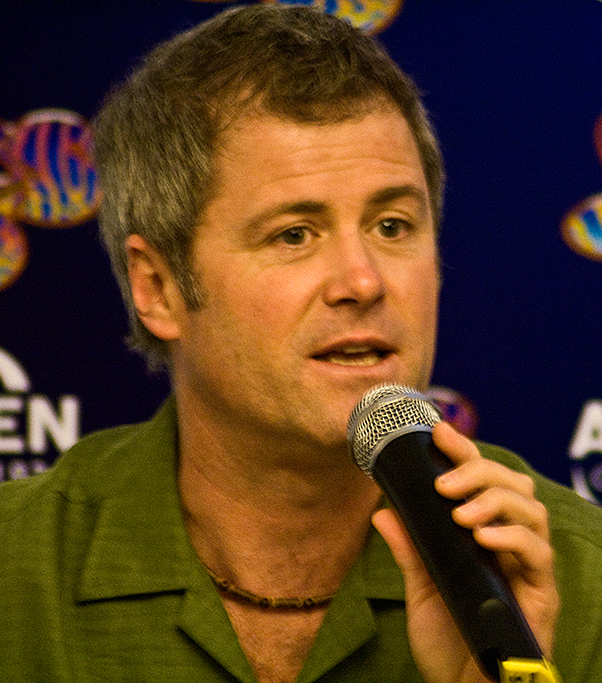
- David in 2010

Background information
- Born: Benoît Gérard Guy David; 19 April 1966 (age 60); Montreal, Quebec, Canada
- Genres: Progressive rock; pop rock
- Occupation: Singer
- Instruments: Vocals; guitar; tambourine
- Years active: 1981–2013
- Label: Unicorn Digital
- Formerly of: Mystery; Yes

Benoît Gérard Guy David (French pronunciation: [bənwa ʒeʁaʁ gi david]; born 19 April 1966) is a Canadian retired singer best known as the lead vocalist in the English progressive rock band Yes from 2009 to 2012. He was also lead singer of the band Mystery from 1999 to 2013, and a Yes tribute band called Close to the Edge.

== Biography ==
=== Early and personal life ===
David was born in Montreal, Quebec on 19 April 1966, and raised in the Brossard suburb. He was raised and schooled speaking French and started learning English on his paper route and talking with his friends. David worked as a courier after school and later, for about ten years, had a weekend job in Montreal selling appliances at a Sears store where he became fluent in English. He then became a used car salesman for Toyota. David has two sons.

David's main musical influences in his youth were Les Classels and musicians Dennis DeYoung and Chris de Burgh, whose voices made him want to take up singing. At around fifteen, he started to sing in bands at school and became known for imitating various singers like Geddy Lee and Laura Branigan. He went on to performing in local bars. He did not receive formal singing tuition, apart from some lessons in later life to help protect his voice.

=== Music career ===
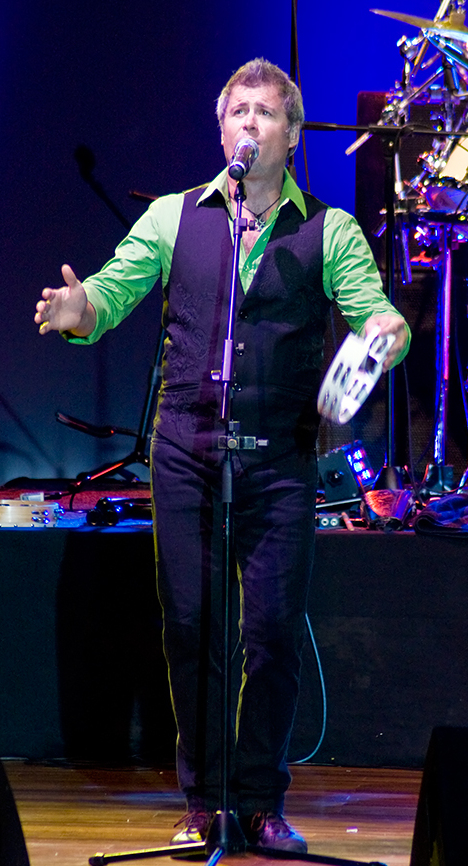
David performing with Yes

In 1994, David was invited by guitarist Philippe Charmettant of Gaia, a Montreal-based Yes tribute band, to audition for the group after he was told David was capable of sounding like their lead singer, Jon Anderson. Later the group renamed themselves Close to the Edge.

In 1999, David joined the rock band Mystery as lead singer and features on the studio albums Beneath the Veil of Winter's Face (2007), One Among the Living (2010), and The World Is a Game (2012). The latter includes David's first songwriting credit as co-lyricist with their founder member and main composer, Michel St-Père.

In 2008, David was announced as the new frontman of Yes, which at the time featured a line-up of Steve Howe, Chris Squire, Alan White, and Oliver Wakeman. David was brought in after Anderson was diagnosed with acute respiratory failure earlier in the year, and needed time to recover. The band, which used in 2008 the moniker "Steve Howe, Chris Squire and Alan White of Yes" for legal reasons, decided to proceed with touring and recruited David in the process, after Squire had watched videos of Close to the Edge performing on YouTube. David put his repair business on hold and to join the band full-time. He was featured on their studio album Fly from Here (2011), produced by Trevor Horn, who sang guide vocals for David to follow. While touring the album in 2011, David began to suffer from respiratory problems which affected his singing. He recalled Squire being unsympathetic towards his issues and merely ordering him to "fix it". The situation culminated during a European tour in December 2011, when David felt he could no longer commit to touring and wanted to leave. He wanted to avoid holding the band up, considering he had no idea how much time he needed to recover from his illness, and for Yes to continue performing for the fans. Squire confirmed David's exit in January 2012 and in the following month, David was replaced by American singer Jon Davison. David continued as a member of Mystery until his departure in 2013.

David has since retired from the music industry. He continues to sing in a choir while working full time on his repair business Vinyle Pro. In 2019, songs featuring David that were prepared during the early Fly from Here sessions were released on the EP From a Page. In a 2023 interview, David said he has not spoken with any of his former Yes bandmates since he left with the exception of Wakeman.

== Discography ==
=== With Mystery ===
- Beneath the Veil of Winter's Face (2007)
- One Among the Living (2010)
- The World Is a Game (2012)
- Tales from the Netherlands (2014)

=== With Yes ===
- Fly from Here (2011)
- In the Present – Live from Lyon (2011)
- From a Page (2019)

=== Appearances ===
- Hamadryad – Safe in Conformity (2005, "Omnipresent Umbra")
- Hamadryad – Intrusion (2010, "In My Country")
- Gordon Giltrap and Oliver Wakeman – Ravens & Lullabies (2013, "From the Turn of a Card")
