= Redemption (Mystery album) =

2023 studio album by Mystery

Studio album by Mystery
- Released: May 15, 2023
- Recorded: 2018–2023
- Genres: Symphonic rock; hard rock; progressive rock
- Length: 74:06
- Label: Unicorn Digital
- Producer: Michel St-Père

Mystery chronology
Lies and Butterflies (2018)	Redemption (2023)

Singles from Redemption
- 1. "Behind the Mirror" Released: October 26, 2022; 2. "Redemption" Released: April 7, 2023

Redemption is the eighth studio album by the Canadian rock band Mystery, released on May 15, 2023, on Unicorn Digital. The album features the same lineup as the band's previous studio album, Lies and Butterflies, as well as featuring guest keyboardist Johnny Maz.

== Production ==
Professional ratings
Review scores
Source	Rating
Classic Rock	7/10 stars
Melodic	3.5/5 stars
Teraz Rock	4/5 stars

=== Background ===
Recording for the album started in 2018 and was originally planned for release in 2021. However, due to the COVID-19 pandemic leading to the cancellation of live events, the band felt they didn't have a deadline to work towards causing progress on the album to slow down, leading to the second longest interval between studio albums. Once the band was able to begin playing live shows again in the summer of 2022, progress on the album began to pick up. With the album the band wanted to remain positive and give people hope.

=== Songs ===
The first track "Behind the Mirror" was inspired by the refugee crisis. The song was released as the first single from the album on October 26, 2022.

Pageau wrote "Every Note" with his brother Marc around 2005. Marc wrote approximately 75 percent of the lyrics while Jean wrote the remaining 25 percent and the music. The song had previously been submitted for consideration to be included on an album and it was decided to ultimately include it on Redemption.

"Pearls and Fire" was written in parts over the span of many years, some of it being written approximately 20 years before the album was released. The song was inspired by the life of Léo Major, a French Canadian soldier who fought in World War II in the Netherlands. St-Père already had the music written for the song, but the lyrics had not been written yet when a fan suggested writing a song about Major's story to the band.

"Homecoming" is the first song Michaud has a writing credit for on a Mystery album and like "Every Note" was also previously submitted to the band.

While working on the album it was originally considered to split "Is This How The Story Ends?" into two parts, one to open the album and the other to close it.

=== Cover art ===
The cover art for the album was produced by photographer and digital artist Kevin Carden. St-Père discovered Carden's work while looking for a cover for Lies and Butterflies.

== Release ==
The album reached number 5 on the Official Charts Independent Album Breakers Chart, number 18 on the Official Rock & Metal Albums Chart and number 45 on the Official Independent Albums Chart for the week of June 22 through June 28, 2023.

== Track listing ==
No.	Title	Lyrics	Music	Length
1.	"Behind the Mirror"	Michel St-Père	Michel St-Père	6:46
2.	"Redemption"	Michel St-Père	Michel St-Père	6:36
3.	"The Beauty and the Least"	Michel St-Père	Michel St-Père	9:15
4.	"Every Note"	Marc Pageau, Jean Pageau	Jean Pageau	6:01
5.	"Pearls and Fire"	Michel St-Père	Michel St-Père	12:43
6.	"My Inspiration"	Michel St-Père	Michel St-Père	8:24
7.	"Homecoming"	Antoine Michaud	Antoine Michaud	5:10
8.	"Is this How the Story Ends?"	Michel St-Père	Michel St-Père	19:11

== Personnel ==
- Jean Pageau - vocals, keyboards, flute
- Michel St-Père - electric and acoustic guitars, keyboards
- François Fournier - bass guitar, Taurus pedals, keyboards, tambourine
- Sylvain Moineau - electric and acoustic guitars
- Jean-Sébastien Goyette - drums
- Antoine Michaud - keyboards, electric and acoustic guitars, growl vocals

Additional musician

- Johnny Maz - keyboards

== Release information ==
- CD - Unicorn Digital - UNCR-5135 - 2023
- Vinyl - Oskar - 049LP - 2023
