= From a Page =

2019 mini-album by Yes

Studio album (mini) / Demo album by Yes
- Released: 25 October 2019
- Recorded: 2010
- Studios: Phoenix, Arizona; Beverly Hills, California; The Opus Suite, Devon
- Genre: Progressive rock
- Length: 2:38:06 (CD) 30:05 (Vinyl)
- Label: Yes 97 LLC
- Producer: Oliver Wakeman

Yes chronology
Yes 50 Live (2019)	From a Page (2019)	The Royal Affair Tour: Live from Las Vegas (2020)

From a Page is an album by the English progressive rock band Yes, initially released as a mini-album on 25 October 2019 by Yes Records, and subsequently extended to a full album for a release in 2026. The original release contains four previously unreleased tracks originally recorded by the 2008–2011 line-up of the group and intended for release on an album, but ultimately not included on the resulting album Fly from Here, and the expanded edition includes one additional unreleased track, three alternate versions of tracks from Fly from Here, and a collection of demos. During this time, the lineup included bassist Chris Squire, guitarist Steve Howe, drummer Alan White, singer Benoît David, and keyboardist Oliver Wakeman. Wakeman, who wrote most of the material on From a Page, was inspired to release it following Squire's death in 2015.

== Overview ==
The release is based around four songs developed by the band in 2009/10, but not then used on 2011's Fly from Here. The line-up is bassist Chris Squire, guitarist Steve Howe, drummer Alan White, singer Benoît David and keyboardist Oliver Wakeman. Wakeman assembled the material following Squire's death.

== Release ==
From a Page was released exclusively through Burning Shed as a single (five-track) vinyl mini-LP (YES002LP) and as the (four-track) first disc of a 3-CD mini box set (YES002BX) along with a re-release of the band's 2011 double live album In the Present – Live from Lyon, recorded in 2009 by the same line-up that recorded From a Page. A digital release came 16 April 2021. According to Wakeman, From a Page may be distributed to stores in other countries "at some point in the future".

An expanded version of From a Page, including tracks from Fly from Here with keyboards by Wakeman and demos, was released in 2026.

== Cover art ==
The cover art was made by long-time Yes collaborator Roger Dean.

== Songs ==
The vinyl and first CD contain four songs, three being previously unreleased studio songs that were worked on in the Fly from Here sessions in late 2010 and the fourth being a new recording of an unfinished song from the same period named "From the Turn of a Card". The song was developed at the same time as the other songs, but not completed. "From the Turn of a Card" was recorded and released in 2013 on the album Ravens & Lullabies by Gordon Giltrap and Oliver Wakeman, with Benoît David on lead vocals. The "From the Turn of a Card" version here is a piano/vocal duet taking David's vocal from that album and using a newly recorded piano accompaniment by Wakeman.

Parts of "The Gift of Love" were based on a piece of music developed for a planned Chris Squire solo album in sessions with Gerard Johnson after he and Squire left The Syn. More of that piece of music was adapted for use on "The Game", the second track on the band's 2014 album Heaven & Earth.

A lyric video for the single mix of "To the Moment" was released on YouTube. The 4:22 single mix version of the track "To the Moment" was only available on the vinyl edition until the 2021 digital version was released.

A version of the song "Aliens" also appeared on Squire and Steve Hackett's Squackett project, on the 2012 album A Life Within a Day, with additional writing credited to Hackett, Roger King, and Fran Healy.

== Track listing ==
=== Original vinyl edition ===
No.	Title	Writer(s)	Length
1.	"To the Moment"	Oliver Wakeman	6:09
2.	"Words on a Page"	Wakeman	6:18
3.	"From the Turn of a Card"	Wakeman	3:24
4.	"The Gift of Love"	Wakeman, Chris Squire, Steve Howe, Benoît David, Alan White	9:52
5.	"To the Moment" (Single Mix)	Wakeman	4:22

=== CD edition ===
CD 1 – From a Page
No.	Title	Writer(s)	Length
1.	"To the Moment"	Wakeman	6:09
2.	"Words on a Page"	Wakeman	6:18
3.	"From the Turn of a Card"	Wakeman	3:24
4.	"The Gift of Love"	Wakeman, Squire, Howe, David, White	9:52

CD 2 & 3 – Re-release of the band's 2011 double live album In the Present – Live from Lyon

=== 2026 vinyl edition ===
LP1:

No.	Title	Writer(s)	Length
1.	"To the Moment"	Oliver Wakeman	6:09
2.	"The Man You Always Wanted Me to Be" (alternate version)	Chris Squire, Gerard Johnson, Simon Sessler
3.	"From the Turn of a Card"	Wakeman	3:24
4.	"Into the Storm" (alternate version)	Wakeman, Chris Squire, Steve Howe, Benoît David, Alan White
5.	"Aliens" (alternate version)	Squire
6.	"Hour of Need" (alternate version)	Howe
7.	"Words on a Page"	Wakeman
8.	"The Gift of Love"	Wakeman, Squire, Howe, David, White	9:52

LP2:

No.	Title	Writer(s)	Length
1.	"Words on a Page" (Demo)	Wakeman
2.	"The Man You Always Wanted Me to Be" (Demo)	Squire, Johnson, Sessler
3.	"To the Moment" (Demo)	Wakeman
4.	"The Gift of Love" (Demo)	Wakeman, Squire, Howe, David, White
5.	"Don’t Take No for an Answer" (Demo)	Howe
6.	"Updraft" (Demo)	Wakeman, White
7.	"To the Moment" (Single Mix)	Wakeman

== Personnel ==
Credits adapted from the vinyl edition.

Yes

- Benoît David – lead vocals, acoustic guitar
- Steve Howe – acoustic and electric guitars, backing vocals
- Chris Squire – bass, backing vocals
- Oliver Wakeman – keyboards, vocals, production, design, layout
- Alan White – drums

Technical personnel

- Patrick MacDougall – engineer
- Tim Weidner – engineer
- Mike Pietrini – mastering
- Karl Groom – mixing
- Roger Dean – painting

== Charts ==
Chart (2019)	Peak position
UK Progressive Albums (Official Charts)	20
UK Rock & Metal Albums (Official Charts)	23

Chart (2026)	Peak position
Japanese Rock Albums (Oricon)	18
Japanese Top Albums Sales (Billboard Japan)	72
Japanese Western Albums (Oricon)	17
Scottish Albums (Official Charts)	21
UK Albums Sales (OCC)	26
UK Rock & Metal Albums (Official Charts)	4
