= One Among the Living =

2010 studio album by Mystery

Studio album by Mystery
- Released: May 1, 2010
- Genre: Symphonic rock, hard rock, progressive rock
- Length: 69:01
- Label: Unicorn Digital
- Producer: Michel St-Père

Mystery chronology
Beneath the Veil of Winter's Face (2007)	One Among the Living (2010)	The World is a Game (2012)

One Among the Living is the fourth studio album by the Canadian rock band Mystery. Prior to recording this album Patrick Bourque had been replaced by François Fournier, Benoît Dupuis rejoined the band as keyboardist after a 12-year absence, and Dean Baldwin joined as a second guitarist.

== Songs ==
Professional ratings
Review scores
Source	Rating
Voir	4/5 stars

The "Through Different Eyes" suite deals with mourning. In the suite, two people, one living and one deceased, feel as though they have lost the other person forever, but in fact are still together, albeit in different places.

As with other Mystery songs, "One Among the Living" and "Between Love and Hate" were two songs that had been written years prior, with "One Among the Living" being written around the time of Destiny?.

== Title ==
Michel St-Père described the meaning of the title of the album as being that no matter what one's profession is, everyone plays an equally important part in what constitutes life.

== Track listing ==
No.	Title	Writer(s)	Length
1.	"Among the Living"	Michel St-Père	1:13
2.	"Wolf"	Michel St-Père, Benoît David	5:53
3.	"Between Love and Hate"	Michel St-Père	5:53
4.	"Till the Truth Comes Out"	Michel St-Père	9:25
5.	"Kameleon Man"	Michel St-Père, Benoît David	5:01
6.	"Through Different Eyes - I) When Sorrow turns to Pain"	Michel St-Père	3:56
7.	"Through Different Eyes - II) Apocalyptic Visions of Paradise"	Michel St-Père	1:48
8.	"Through Different Eyes - III) So Far Away"	Michel St-Père	5:51
9.	"Through Different Eyes - IV) The Point of No Return"	Michel St-Père	2:21
10.	"Through Different Eyes - V) The Silent Scream"	Michel St-Père	5:57
11.	"Through Different Eyes - VI) Dancing with Butterflies"	Michel St-Père	2:42
12.	"One Among the Living"	Michel St-Père	6:27
13.	"The Falling Man"	Michel St-Père	7:39
14.	"Sailing on a Wing"	Michel St-Père	4:55

== Personnel ==
Mystery

- Benoît David - lead vocals
- Michel St-Père - guitars, keyboards
- Steve Gagné - drums

Mystery live band members, session musicians

- Benoît Dupuis - keyboards (tracks 1, 2, 11, 12, 14)
- Dean Baldwin - guitars (track 13)
- François Fournier - bass (track 12), Taurus pedals

Additional musicians

- Antoine Fafard - bass (tracks: 2–4, 6–11, 14)
- Claire Vezina - back vocals (track 14)
- Daryl Stuermer - guitar solo (track 14)
- John Jowitt - bass guitar (track 5)
- Oliver Wakeman - moog solo (track 5)
- Richard Lanthier - bass (track 13)

== Release information ==
- CD - Unicorn Digital - UNCR-5080 - 2010
