= In the Present – Live from Lyon =

Live album by Yes
- Released: 29 November 2011
- Recorded: 1 December 2009
- Venue: Bourse du Travail (Lyon, France)
- Genre: Progressive rock
- Length: 2:09:08
- Label: Frontiers Records
- Producer: Yes

Yes chronology
| Fly from Here (2011) | In the Present – Live from Lyon (2011) | High Vibration (2013) |

Yes video chronology
| Union Live (2011) | In the Present – Live from Lyon (2011) | Live Hemel Hempstead Pavilion October 3rd 1971 (2014) |

In the Present – Live from Lyon is a 2-CD/DVD live album by Yes, released on 29 November 2011 in North America and 2 December 2011 in Europe.

== Overview ==
In the Present – Live from Lyon is a recording of a Yes show on 1 December 2009 at the Bourse du Travail, Lyon, France as a part of their In the Present Tour which they undertook before the release of their new studio album Fly from Here (2011) featuring newcomer Benoît David on lead vocals.

It is the only Yes live album featuring lead vocalist Benoît David (from Mystery) and also the band's first live record without lead singer Jon Anderson, whom David replaced. It was also the only release with Oliver Wakeman as a member of the band, until the release of the From a Page album in 2019.

Professional ratings
Review scores
| Source | Rating |
|---|---|
| AllMusic | 2.5/5 stars |
| Classic Rock | 4/5 stars |

== Track listing ==
Disc one
| No. | Title | Writer(s) | Length |
|---|---|---|---|
| 1. | "Siberian Khatru" | Jon Anderson, Steve Howe, Rick Wakeman | 10:39 |
| 2. | "I've Seen All Good People": a. "Your Move"; b. "All Good People" | Anderson, Chris Squire | 7:17 |
| 3. | "Tempus Fugit" | Geoff Downes, Trevor Horn, Howe, Squire, Alan White | 6:05 |
| 4. | "Onward" | Squire | 4:38 |
| 5. | "Astral Traveller" | Anderson | 8:49 |
| 6. | "Yours Is No Disgrace" | Anderson, Bill Bruford, Howe, Tony Kaye, Squire | 13:23 |
| 7. | "And You and I": I. "Cord of Life"; II. "Eclipse"; III. "The Preacher, the Teacher"; IV. "Apocalypse" | Anderson; themes by Bruford, Howe, Squire | 11:27 |
| 8. | "Corkscrew" (Steve Howe solo) | Howe | 3:49 |
| 9. | "Second Initial" (Japanese bonus track) | Howe | 3:19 |

Disc two
| No. | Title | Writer(s) | Length |
|---|---|---|---|
| 1. | "Owner of a Lonely Heart" | Anderson, Horn, Trevor Rabin, Squire | 6:05 |
| 2. | "South Side of the Sky" | Anderson, Squire | 10:44 |
| 3. | "Machine Messiah" | Downes, Horn, Howe, Squire, White | 11:41 |
| 4. | "Heart of the Sunrise" | Anderson, Bruford, Squire | 11:43 |
| 5. | "Roundabout" | Anderson, Howe | 9:35 |
| 6. | "Starship Trooper": a. "Life Seeker"; b. "Disillusion"; c. "Würm" | Anderson, Howe, Squire | 13:08 |

DVD
| No. | Title | Writer(s) | Length |
|---|---|---|---|
| 1. | "Interviews" (Labeled as "Yes Live Documentary: A Film by Philippe Nicolet") | Benoît David, Downes, Howe, Squire, White |
| 2. | "Excerpts from the Live Show" |
| 3. | "Roundabout" | Anderson, Howe |
| 4. | "Machine Messiah" | Downes, Horn, Howe, Squire, White |

== Personnel ==
- Benoît David – lead vocals, acoustic guitars, percussions
- Steve Howe – guitars, pedal steel guitar, backing vocals
- Chris Squire – bass, backing vocals
- Oliver Wakeman – keyboards
- Alan White – drums
