= Jabberwocky (album) =

Studio album by Clive Nolan & Oliver Wakeman
- Released: 25 January 1999
- Recorded: Thin Ice Studios, Surrey
- Genre: Progressive rock
- Length: 53:42
- Label: Verglas Music, Elflock Records
- Producer: Clive Nolan and Karl Groom

Clive Nolan & Oliver Wakeman chronology
| Jabberwocky (1999) | The Hound of the Baskervilles (2002) |

Jabberwocky is a progressive rock album released in 1999 by British keyboardists Clive Nolan and Oliver Wakeman. It was the first of two albums released by the duo.

In 2021 it was remastered along with The Hound of the Baskervilles as part of the box set Tales by Gaslight. This also included Dark Fables, an album of previously unreleased songs plus the original recording of Rick Wakeman reading the poem "Jabberwocky". The remastering process added two guitar solos, one on each album, that had been planned for the original recordings but overlooked.

When consulted on the artwork for box set, Jabberwocky cover artist Rodney Matthews pointed out that the image had been reversed on the original album cover, booklet and poster, so the correct orientation was restored on the box set version.

== Plot ==
The album is based on the homonymous poem by Lewis Carroll. It is organised as a cantata, with four singers taking the main roles of The Boy, The Girl, The Jabberwock and The Tree, plus a narrator who reads excerpts of the original poem and a choir that sings fragments taken from Dante's Divina Commedia.

== Track listing ==
All songs written by Clive Nolan and Oliver Wakeman.

1. Overture – 5:57
2. Coming to Town – 2:55
3. Dangerous World – 6:54
4. The Forest – 4:22
5. A Glimmer of Light – 2:42
6. Shadows – 4:19
7. Enlightenment – 5:23
8. Dancing Water – 4:12
9. The Burgundy Rose – 3:55
10. The Mission – 4:32
11. Call to Arms – 6:37
12. Finale – 1:50

== Personnel ==
- Bob Catley as The Boy
- Tracy Hitchings as The Girl
- James Plumridge as The Jabberwock
- Paul Allison as The Tree
- Pete Gee – Fretless Bass
- Clive Nolan – Keyboards
- Oliver Wakeman – Keyboards
- Ian Salmon – Guitar & Bass
- Peter Banks – Guitars
- Jon Jeary – Acoustic Guitar
- Tony Fernandez – Drums
- Rick Wakeman – The Narrator
- Michelle Young, Michelle Gulrajani, Suzanne Chenery, Tracy Hitchings, Sian Roberts, John Jowitt, Dave Wagstaffe, Donald Morrison, Ian Gould, John Mitchell, Tina Riley & Clive Nolan – The Choir

Additional personnel

- David Mark Pearce – additional guitar on "The Burgundy Rose" (2021 remaster only)

Production

- Clive Nolan & Karl Groom – producers and engineers
- Matt Goodluck – design and layout
- Rodney Matthews – artwork
