= Beneath the Veil of Winter's Face =

2007 studio album by Mystery

Studio album by Mystery
- Released: May 15, 2007
- Genre: Symphonic rock, hard rock, progressive rock
- Length: 62:39
- Label: Unicorn Digital
- Producer: Michel St-Père

Mystery chronology
| Destiny? (1998) | Beneath the Veil of Winter's Face (2007) | One Among the Living (2010) |

Beneath the Veil of Winter's Face is the third studio album by the Canadian rock band Mystery. It is the first Mystery album to feature Benoît David on lead vocals, and the first without former lead vocalist Gary Savoie. The band's lineup remained unchanged aside from this. Originally to be recorded soon after Destiny?, it was released in 2007 due to Michel St-Père shifting his focus to his record label. This was the last album to feature bassist Patrick Bourque, who died shortly after the album's release.

== Production ==
=== Background ===
Professional ratings
Review scores
| Source | Rating |
|---|---|
| Voir | 3.5/5 stars |

Work for Beneath the Veil of Winter's Face started around the turn of the millennium but due to a variety of reasons, including Michel St-Père's work on his record label Unicorn Digital and the conversion of the recording studio into a completely digital one, the album took several years to complete.

Originally the album was meant to be a concept album following the rise and fall of a young artist, but then-new singer Benoît David suggested to drop the concept aspect of it. The track listing was slightly different in the planning stages of the album, and was meant to include the title track from One Among the Living originally.

Richard Addison, Mystery's original bassist, was going to play bass on the album, but ultimately did not.

The album was meant to be released sometime in 2000, was pushed back to the fall of 2001, then pushed back to the fall of 2003, and was finally released on May 15, 2007.

=== Recording ===
Beneath the Veil of Winter's Face was recorded on ADAT and then transferred to a computer for mixing.

== Track listing ==
| No. | Title | Writer(s) | Length |
|---|---|---|---|
| 1. | "As I Am" | Michel St-Père | 5:41 |
| 2. | "Beneath the Veil of Winter's Face" | Michel St-Père | 5:58 |
| 3. | "Snowhite" | Michel St-Père | 4:07 |
| 4. | "Travel to the Night" | Michel St-Père, Dré | 8:38 |
| 5. | "The Scarlet Eye" | Michel St-Père | 5:35 |
| 6. | "The Third Dream" | Michel St-Père | 6:11 |
| 7. | "Voyage to the Other Side" | Michel St-Père | 6:24 |
| 8. | "The Sailor and the Mermaid" | Michel St-Père | 5:23 |
| 9. | "The Awakening" | Michel St-Père | 11:12 |
| 10. | "The Preacher's Fall" | Michel St-Père | 3:30 |

Vinyl additional tracks
| No. | Title | Writer(s) | Length |
|---|---|---|---|
| 11. | "Snowhite 2020" | Michel St-Père | 4:03 |
| 12. | "The Scarlet Eye (live)" | Michel St-Père | 5:24 |
| 13. | "Beneath the Veil of Winter’s Face (demo)" | Michel St-Père | 5:47 |

== Personnel ==
Mystery

- Benoît David - lead vocals
- Michel St-Père - electric and acoustic guitars, bass, keyboards
- Steve Gagné - drums
- Patrick Bourque - bass

Additional musicians

- Antoine Fafard - bass
- Benoît Pépin - bass
- Serge Gangloff - special wind FX

== Release information ==
- CD - Unicorn Digital - UNCR-5040 - 2007
- CD - ProgRock Records - PRR640 - 2008
- Vinyl - Oskar - 030LP/031LP - 2021
