= Oliver Wakeman =

English musician

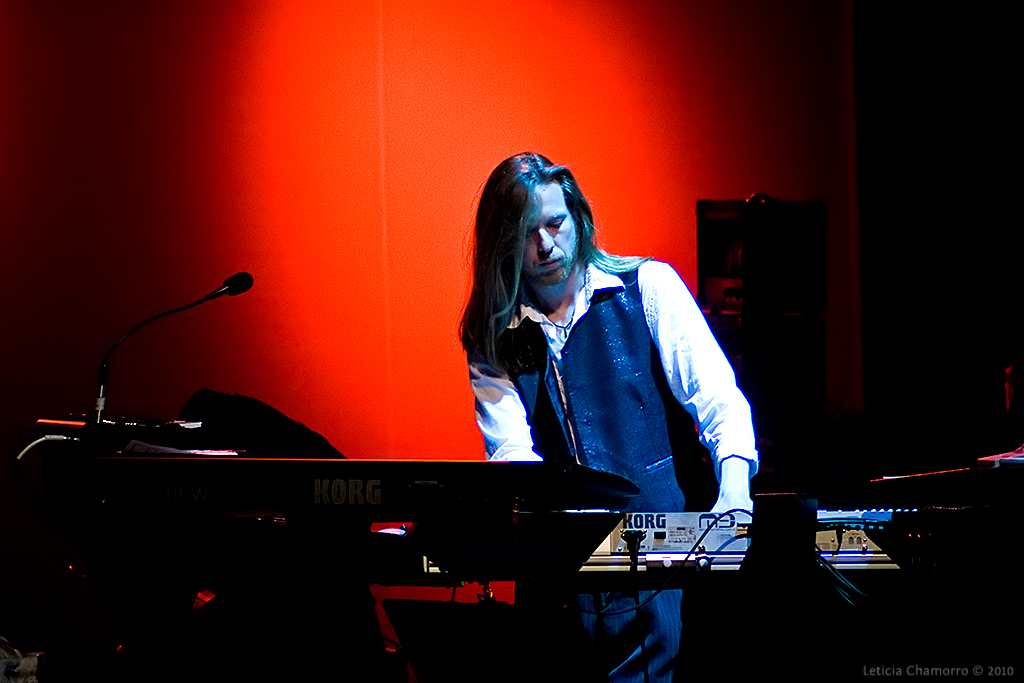
- Wakeman performing with Yes (1 December 2010)

Background information
- Born: 26 February 1972 (age 54); Wembley, London, England
- Genre: Progressive rock
- Occupations: Musician, composer
- Instruments: Keyboards; piano; synthesizers; vocals; guitars
- Years active: 1997–present
- Formerly of: Yes, Strawbs
- Website: oliverwakeman.co.uk

Oliver Wakeman (born 26 February 1972) is an English musician and composer. He was a member of Yes from 2009 to 2011, filling the role of keyboardist previously held by his father, Rick Wakeman. He was the first member of the band to be born after the band's founding. Jon Davison would later become the second.

== Biography ==
Oliver is the first son of Rick Wakeman and his first wife Rosaline Woolford and is the older brother of Adam Wakeman. His parents divorced when he was young.

=== Solo ===
He worked with Clive Nolan (of Arena) on two progressive rock concept albums, Jabberwocky (released 1999) and Hound of the Baskervilles (released 2002). Tracy Hitchings appears on both albums, while Rick Wakeman (narrating) and Yes alumnus Peter Banks both appeared on Jabberwocky. The two reconvened in 2001 to complete the tracks which were written for their abandoned 3rd album 'Frankenstein'. These were released as part of the 'Tales By Gaslight' Box set and as a separate stand alone release.

Wakeman worked with guitarist Steve Howe for several years. The two lived fairly close to each other in south-west England. Howe guested on Wakeman's solo album The 3 Ages of Magick, while Wakeman is on Howe's 2005 solo album Spectrum and contributed to Howe's recording of "Australia" for the US version of the Yes collection The Ultimate Yes: 35th Anniversary Collection. Music from these two albums appear on two of Howe's box sets.

Wakeman wrote a CD inspired by his visits to and experiences on Lundy, a small island in the Bristol Channel, which was released originally in 1997 and then again in 1999. He toured with Bob Catley in the UK and Europe and also guested on an Ayreon project The Human Equation in 2004. Wakeman replaced keyboardist Herb Schildt for the American progressive rock band Starcastle at RoSfest (Rites of Spring festival) 2007.

During 2006 and 2007 Wakeman took to the road with his band performing selections from his Mother's Ruin album as well as songs from his back catalogue. In late 2007 this show was filmed and recorded in Poland and subsequently released in 2008 as a CD/DVD package and single DVD titled Coming To Town. A single CD release appeared in 2009.

He spent 2012 working with Gordon Giltrap on a new recording project titled Ravens & Lullabies which was released in 2013. They toured together throughout September and October 2012 in preparation for the album's release.

The tour continued throughout 2013, including a full band headline show at the Summer's End festival. Oliver & Gordon also appeared with singer Paul Manzi on Bob Harris' BBC Radio 2 show in June 2013. The tours continued throughout 2013 and 2014 saw a full band lineup recreate the Raven's & Lullabies album in full. Recordings for these concerts were released as From a Stage which was also the third CD in Wakeman's Collaborations box set.

Wakeman's The 3 Ages of Magick was re-released in 2013 with bonus material and an expanded booklet.

Wakeman spent the new few years working on sessions for various artists as well as working on the Yes box set From a Page. Following the completion of the Dark Fables project Wakeman began work on his latest album Anam Cara.

=== Yes ===
In 2008, the official Yes website announced that Oliver Wakeman would tour with Yes in the band's 40th anniversary tour. However, the tour was postponed due to the illness of Yes singer Jon Anderson. A revamped In the Present Tour featuring Steve Howe, Chris Squire and Alan White of Yes plus Oliver Wakeman and Canadian singer Benoît David (filling in for Anderson) began in the fall of 2008 (under the moniker "Steve Howe, Chris Squire and Alan White of Yes"), and continued into 2009 (under the name "Yes"). The second leg of the tour was cancelled after one date when Squire had to have an urgent leg operation on 11 February.

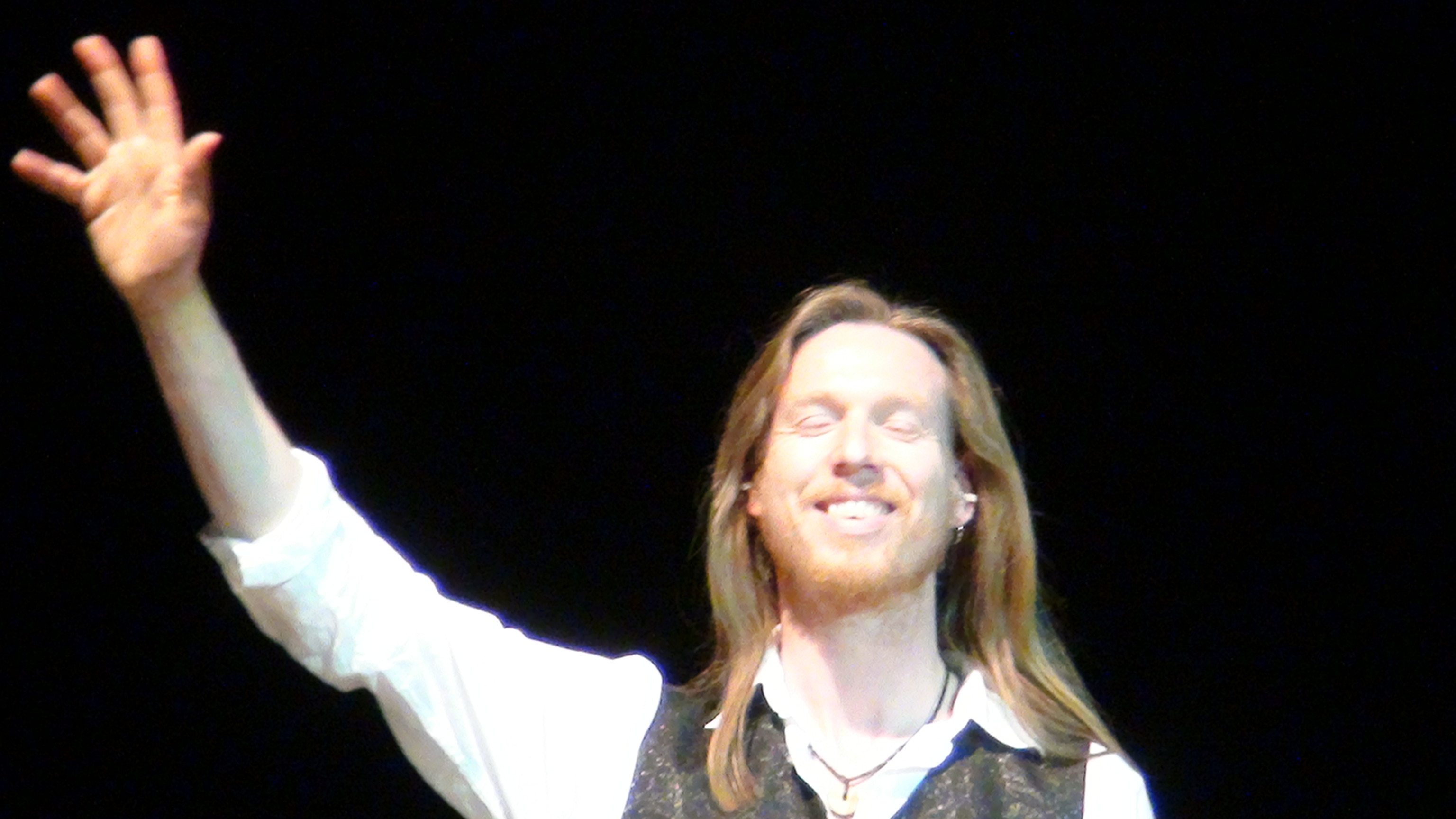
Wakeman after a show with Yes in Brazil, November 2010.

The band returned to touring in summer 2009 and this continued through to summer 2010. They also signed to Frontiers Records, an Italian record company. Yes started work on an album with Wakeman in October/November 2010 followed by a tour of South America in November/December of that year. Though he worked with the band on the initial sessions for their first album in 10 years, Fly from Here, he was dismissed from Yes during recording. Wakeman stayed on for the Rite of Spring tour (March to early April 2011) and formally left following its completion. Asia and Drama era Yes keyboardist Geoff Downes, who replaced Wakeman for the rest of the album's sessions, was later announced as keyboardist for its upcoming summer tour. Some of Wakeman's contributions to Fly from Here nevertheless made it onto the released version of the album, and he was credited as having co-written one track. He also appears on the Yes CD and DVD release In the Present – Live from Lyon playing all of the keyboards. Wakeman also appears in the documentary film which accompanies this release.

In 2019, material Wakeman wrote and recorded with Yes was released as From a Page.

=== Starcastle ===
Oliver joined Starcastle for their April 2007 headlining performance at the Rites of Spring festival (ROSfest), an annual progressive rock festival in Pennsylvania.

=== Strawbs ===
In 2009, Wakeman joined Strawbs (another of his father's former bands) for their tours of Canada, the UK and Italy during 2009 and 2010.

He recorded an album with the band, Dancing to the Devil's Beat which was released in 2009.

In 2010 he appeared on the Strawbs 40th anniversary live double CD, Strawberry Fayre.

Wakeman was not with the band for their late 2010 tour given his prior commitment to recording with Yes.

== Discography ==
=== Solo albums ===
- Heaven's Isle - Oliver Wakeman - Opus Music 1997 (Re-issue - Verglas Music 1999)
- The 3 Ages of Magick - Oliver Wakeman with Steve Howe - Resurgence 2001 (re-issue - Esoteric Recordings 2013)
- Chakras - Oliver Wakeman - Disky / EMI Records 2002
- Purification by Sound - Oliver Wakeman - President Records 2003
- Spiritual Enlightenment & Inspiration - Oliver Wakeman - Disky/EMI Records 2002
- Mother's Ruin - Oliver Wakeman - ProgRock Records 2005
- Anam Cara - Oliver Wakeman - Spirit of Unicorn/Cherry Red/Elflock Records 2024

=== Live albums - as Oliver Wakeman Band ===
- Coming to Town - Live from Katowice (DVD & CD) - Oliver Wakeman Band - MetalMind Records 2008 - DVD, 2009 CD

=== Oliver Wakeman & Rodney Matthews ===
- Trinity - Rodney Matthews & Jeff Scheetz with Oliver Wakeman - Rodney Matthews Studios 2019
- Yendor - Film Soundtrack - Oliver Wakeman, Sarah Matthews & Rodney Matthews - Rodney Matthews Studios
- In the Bleak Midwinter - Rodney Matthews and Oliver Wakeman - Rodney Matthews Studios 2019

=== Oliver Wakeman & Clive Nolan ===
- Jabberwocky - Oliver Wakeman & Clive Nolan - Verglas Music 1999
- The Hound of the Baskervilles - Oliver Wakeman & Clive Nolan - Verglas Music 2002
- Dark Fables (also, disc 3 of Tales by Gaslight 3cd set) - Wakeman & Nolan - Elflock Records 2021

=== Oliver Wakeman & Gordon Giltrap ===
- Ravens & Lullabies - Oliver Wakeman & Gordon Giltrap - Esoteric Antenna Records 2013
- From A Stage (Live) (only available as disc 3 of Collaborations 3cd set) - Oliver Wakeman & Gordon Giltrap - Elflock Records 2022

=== EPs ===
- Mother's Ruin EP (EP) - Oliver Wakeman - Loa Records 2006
- The View From Here (EP) - Oliver Wakeman & Rachel Williams - Watermark Records 2002

=== Box Sets ===
- Tales By Gaslight (3 CD box) - Oliver Wakeman & Clive Nolan - Elflock Records 2021
  - CD1 Jabberwocky
  - CD2 The Hound of the Baskervilles
  - CD3 Dark Fables
- Collaborations (3 CD box) - Oliver Wakeman - Elflock Records 2022
  - CD1 The 3 Ages of Magick
  - CD2 Ravens & Lullabies
  - CD3 From A Stage (Live with Gordon Giltrap)

=== With The Strawbs ===
- Dancing to the Devil's Beat - (Witchwood Media 2009)
- Strawberry Fayre (Live) - (Witchwood Media 2010)

=== With Yes ===
- In the Present – Live from Lyon (DVD & CD) - (Frontiers 2011)
- Fly from Here - Keyboard performances on 4 tracks (2011)
- Fly from Here - Return Trip - Keyboard performances on 4 tracks (2018)
- From a Page (2019)

=== With Light Freedom Revival ===
- Eterniverse Deja Vu (2017)
- Whitefield (single) (2017)
- Truthonomy (2018)
- Wildest Dreams (single) (2019)
- Musicsoul Continuum: Jon Anderson Tribute Album (2020)

=== Appearances ===
- 11th Hour - Madrigal 2024
- No Va Más Feat. Billy Sheehan - (Dario Imaz, 2023)
- Evergreen (Carrie Martin, 2023)
- The Black Watch - Munroe's Thunder - 2022
- Some People (Inventioning with Jon Anderson, Jean-Luc Ponty and Michael Lewis, 2021)
- Entity - Carrie Martin 2021
- Together Apart (John Holden and Friends, 2021)
- You Make Me Believe - University Hospitals Birmingham Charity Single - 2020
- Crossover (David Cross and Peter Banks, 2020)
- Rise and Fall (John Holden, 2020)
- Capture Light (John Holden) - keys on 3 tracks
- Seductive Sky - Carrie Martin 2017
- Ordinary Magic Brenda Layne & Tommy Osuna - 2015
- Hypatia - Telergy 2015
- Heaven on Lundy - A journey Through Time DVD - Features the track Memories from the Heaven’s Isle album 2015
- What If? - Carrie Martin 2014
- Blue (Paul Bond, 2013)
- Let the Song Begin (King Friday with Joe Macre, 2012)
- Strange Ang3ls (David Mark Pearce) - keyboard solo
- Timeline (best of) - (Ayreon) 2010
- One Among the Living (Mystery) - keyboard solo on the track "Kameleon Man"
- Spectrum (Steve Howe) - keys on 4 tracks
- All Around the World (Prog Aid v Various artists) - keys
- Complementary Medicine DVD - Progress of the Soul from Spiritual Enlightenment is the title music 2004
- The Human Equation (Ayreon)- keyboard solo on the track "Day17: Accident?" 2004
- Integration (Hybrid) - keyboards on "Man on the Moon" and "Moving Lights"

=== Commissions ===
- Name That Tune - CD Jingle
- The Great Epic Poems - Incidental Music
- The Great Love Poets - Incidental Music
- The Great War Poets - Incidental Music
- Poems of Natural Beauty - Incidental Music
- Heroic Poems - Incidental Music
- Lovers Trysts Poems - Incidental Music

=== CD Samplers and Compilations ===
- Prog Magazine: Giants Under The Sun - Various Artists Covermount Sampler 2018
- Anthology 2 - Steve Howe 2017
- Anthology - Steve Howe 2015
- Songs from The Great War - BBC 3 CD set 2014
- Sailing Uncharted Seas - PROG Magazine Covermount Sampler 2013
- Empire Magazine - Various Artists Sampler 2008
- One Heart - Various Artists Charity Record 2002
- 'Mellotron' Magazine Issue 30 Cover CD - Various Artists Sampler 2001
- Metal Invader Cover CD - Various Artists Sampler 1999
- Classic Rock' Magazine Cover CD - Various Artists Sampler 1999
- Verglas Sampler Volume 2 - Various Artists Sampler 1999

== See also ==
- Adam Wakeman (brother)
