= Tracy Hitchings =

British singer (1962–2022)

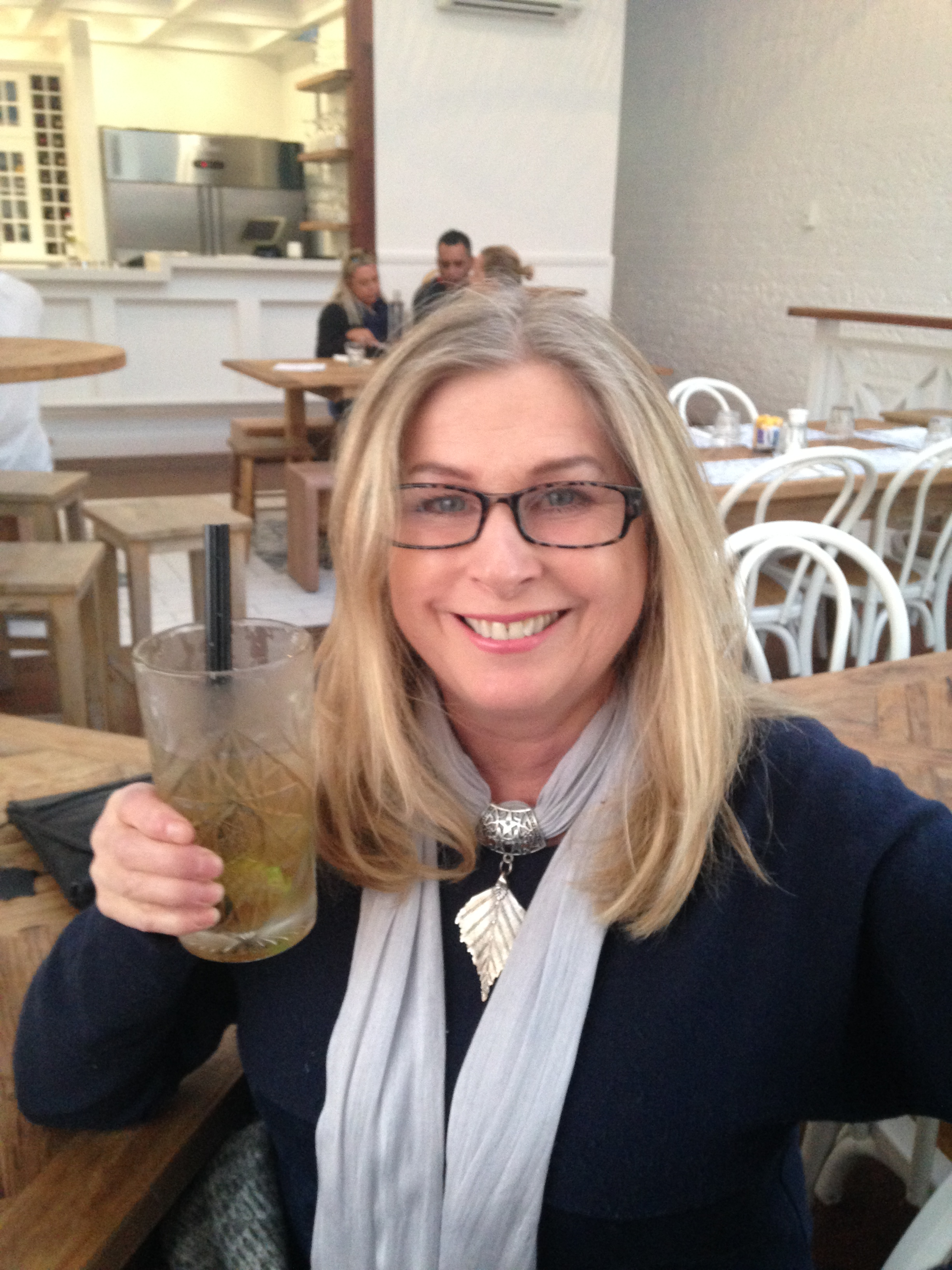

Background information
- Born: 11 October 1962; St Mawes, Cornwall, England
- Died: 10 December 2022 (aged 60) Gold Coast, Australia
- Genre: Progressive rock
- Occupations: Singer, songwriter
- Years active: 1989–2022
- Formerly of: Quasar, Landmarq, Blue Heat, Purple Haze
- Spouse: Peter Yaxley (m. 2014)

Tracy Hitchings (11 October 1962 – 10 December 2022) was an English musician and the former lead vocalist for the progressive rock band Landmarq. Her musical credits spanned from 1989 to 2022 with many notable sessions with various bands and artists, predominantly in the British neo-prog scene. Hitchings was known for her charismatic stage presence and her wide vocal range.

== Early years ==
Hitchings was born in St Mawes, Cornwall, going to London at the age of 20 to pursue a career in Music. After many line-up changes, neo-prog band Quasar were auditioning for a lead vocalist. Hitchings answered the band's advert in Melody Maker and joined the band. Her first work with them was the 1989 album The Loreli, to which she contributed lyrics for four of the five tracks. Hitchings toured with the band for 18 months.

In 1990, Hitchings collaborated with Pendragon keyboardist Clive Nolan and Threshold guitarist Karl Groom to form Strangers on a Train, which recorded the album The Key Part I:The Prophecy. Nolan and Groom would subsequently make strong contributions to Hitching's debut solo album From Ignorance to Ecstasy, recorded and released in 1991 (Nolan, in particular, providing lyrical and compositional contributions as well as keyboard work). The album was a mix of different progressive rock styles with much shorter compositions, and solidified what would become Hitchings' signature theatrical vocals with multiple harmonies, differing from her previous work. Upon completion of her solo album, Hitchings contributed lead vocals to the title track of the artist Gandalf's album Gallery of Dreams.

In 1993, Hitchings made a guest appearance on an album track from the band Ulysses debut album Neronia. She sang on two songs: "Teenage Sweethearts" and "Forever Lost". Also in 1993, Hitchings reunited with Groom and Nolan for a second Strangers on a Train album, The Key Part II: The Labyrinth. For this sequel, Nolan got vocalist Alan Reed to sing along with Hitchings for a number of duets and solo pieces. Both Part I and Part II have been reissued as of 1998.

In 1994, Hitchings sang on Gandalf's To Our Children's Children, contributing lead vocals to five of the nine songs on the album: her passionate and soothing voice complemented the album's keyboards and symphonic arrangements. At the end of 1994, Hitchings joined another Karl Groom project, Blue Heat. The band recorded ten songs for an album called Dancing on Stones, but due to undisclosed reasons, the album remains unreleased. Between 1992 and 1995, Hitchings made appearances on the albums Ring of Roses, Through the Looking Glass and Mad as a Hatter by a second Nolan/Groom project, Shadowland. She also appeared in the 1993 album Heart of David by Peter Gee. In 1995, she contributed vocals to the Pendragon album Masquerade Overture.

== Landmarq ==
In 1996, following long-term frontman Damian Wilson's departure from the band, Landmarq was in search of a new lead vocalist. Wanting to explore new endeavours, Hitchings joined the band for what would be her longest continuous musical association. With Hitchings in place, Landmarq recorded the vocally-centered album Science of Coincidence in 1998. The following year, the band recorded the live album Thunderstruck. In 2002, they released the EP, Aftershock. In 2006, the band recorded another live album entitled Turbulence-Live in Poland. The performance was released in both CD and DVD.

Following the Turbulence tour, Hitchings revealed she had been diagnosed with breast and ovarian cancer and was commencing treatment. Following extensive treatment, Hitchings was medically cleared but her diagnosis would later change.

In 2012, 14 years after their previous studio recording, the band recorded the album Entertaining Angels. The album marked the band's signature sound along with Hitchings' potent and cheerful voice. The album's lyrics were inspired by her battle with cancer. As Hitchings stated in an interview with ProgRock magazine in 2013: "All the lyrics were born of my spiritual beliefs. Stories got reshaped as I was overcoming cancer with a very unconventional method, as part of reshaping my life and helping me rid myself of my nemesis." The band continued to tour in 2013 in support of the new album. A live album, RoadSkill - Live in the Netherlands, followed in 2015. She amicably left Landmarq in 2018 to relocate to another part of the UK.

== Later work (during and after Landmarq period) ==
During her time with Landmarq, Hitchings maintained her musical relationship with Clive Nolan, contributing to three of his rock operas over the course of fourteen years. In 1999, she sang on the Nolan/Oliver Wakeman project Jabberwocky, returning three years later in 2002 for the follow-up, Hound of the Baskervilles. In 2013, she sang the role of Jane Muncey in Nolan's solo rock opera Alchemy.

Over the years, Hitchings also worked with other progressive rock musicians such as Steve Hackett, John Wetton, Rick Wakeman, Peter Banks, Bob Catley, Mike Stobbie of Pallas, and John Jowitt and Martin Orford of IQ.

Hitchings met her husband Peter Yaxley on a Spiritual Mediterranean cruise in 2012, before eventually marrying in Australia and continuing her solo music recording from local studios. Several songs were ready for release at the time of a resurgence of her illness after a 20 year remission.

== Death ==
On 10 December 2022, Landmarq announced the death of Tracy Hitchings via a post on the band's Facebook page. It was announced that work was underway with her production team to publish unreleased songs and videos.
