= The World Unreal =

Studio album by the Gourishankar
- Released: January 14, 2016
- Recorded: 2009–2015 at Manaraga Recording Studios, Syktyvkar, Russia
- Genres: Progressive rock, art-rock, eclectic prog, experimental rock
- Length: 1:01:01
- Label: ArtBeat Music
- Producer: Nomy Agranson

The World Unreal is the third studio album by Russian progressive rock band the Gourishankar, released at Russia on January 14, 2016 through ArtBeat Music.

== Track listing ==
All titles, writing credits, and song lengths taken from The World Unreal. All lyrics by Jason Offen Vocal melodies by Jason Offen and Nomy Agranson.

No.	Title	Lyrics	Music	Length
1.	"Intro - Fate"	Jason Offen	Nomy Agranson	2:04
2.	"Order and Chaos"		Nomy Agranson	5:31
3.	"First Rush"		Nomy Agranson	5:02
4.	"Let It Go"		Nomy Agranson	4:12
5.	"Place for Everything"		Nomy Agranson	4:46
6.	"Heartland"		Nomy Agranson	5:54
7.	"Truth Stays Silent a) The Deception b) Money Talks c) Retribution"		Nomy Agranson	12:01
8.	"World Unreal"		Nomy Agranson	4:41
9.	"Time Follows"		Nomy Agranson	5:49
10.	"Pleasure and Suffering: Part 1"		Nomy Agranson	5:44
11.	"Pleasure and Suffering: Part 2"		Nomy Agranson	5:23
Total length:				61:01

== Line-up ==
- Jason Offen – lead vocals, backing vocals
- Nomy Agranson – electric and acoustic guitars, fretted and fret less basses, keyboards, synths and programming, mandolin
- Svetoslav Bogdanov – drums and percussion

=== Session musicians ===
- Evgeniy Ryabashev – violins on "Truth Stays Silent", "World Unreal"
- Leonid Nesterov – trumpets on "First Rush", "Truth Stays Silent" and "Pleasure and Suffering"
- Alena Sergeeva – classical vocals on "Truth Stays Silent" and "Pleasure and Suffering".
- Darina Popova – atmospheric female voice on "Intro - Fate"
- Maria Domashenko – space backing vocals on "Order and Chaos"
- Anna Popova – ethnic komi vocals on "Order and Chaos"
- Sergey Fedorov – backing vocals on "Order and Chaos"
- Ivan Tropnikov – backing vocals on "Time Follows"
- Arseniy Kadanev – children's voices on "Pleasure and Suffering"

Some of the songs used ideas by Doran Usher.

== Production ==
- All music composed by Nomy Agranson
- All lyrics by Jason Offen
- Vocal melodies by Jason Offen and Nomy Agranson
- Drum lines by Svetoslav Bogdanov and Nomy Agranson
- Produced by Nomy Agranson and Jason Offen
- Executive producer – Nikolay ‘Big Nick’ Bogaychuk
- Mastering by Vladimir Ovchinnikov, Studio Mosfilm, Moscow, Russia, 2015

Recorded, engineered & mixed by Nomy Agranson at home and at Manaraga Recording Studios, Syktyvkar, Russia, between 2009 and 2015, except backing vocals for "Pleasure and Suffering. Part 2" and "Time Follows", recorded by Martin Brookes at Sol y Sonido Studios, Farajan, Spain, 2014.
