= The Gourishankar =

Progressive rock band from Russia

Gourishankar
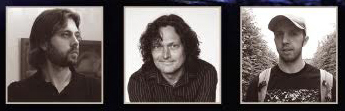
- the Gourishankar in 2016 (from left to right): Nomy Agranson, Jason Offen, Svetoslav Bogdanov

Background information
- Origin: Syktyvkar, Russia
- Genres: Progressive rock, art rock, symphonic prog, eclectic prog, experimental rock
- Years active: 2001–present
- Labels: Unicorn Digital, Mals, ArtBeat Music
- Past members: Vlad MJ Whiner
- Website: gourishankar.bandcamp.com

The Gourishankar is a progressive rock band from Russia formed in 2001 by university friends guitarist Alexandr "Nomy" Agranovich (a.k.a. Agranson) and keyboardist Doran Usher in the Russian provincial city Syktyvkar.

In 2002 the band released their debut demo tape Integral Symphony followed in 2003 by their first studio album, Close Grip. Their second studio album 2nd Hands, was recorded in 2006 and was released by Unicorn Digital on March 15, 2007. The album revealed their unique style of music, which blends many musical genres. 2nd Hands was nominated for the Prog Awards 2007 within "Best Foreign Band" section, nominated for best debut of the year at Deutsche progressive pages and took second place.

In 2015, the jazz label ArtBeat Music was all deluxe editions heritage group called the 1st Decade. The third studio album The World Unreal was released at Russia on January 14, 2016.

== Members ==
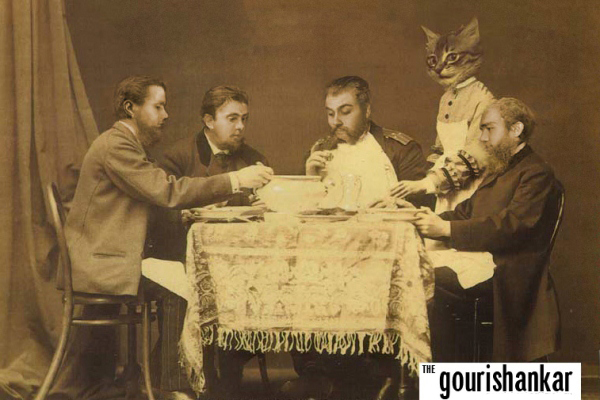
Gourishankar - Band at 2002

Current

- Jason Offen – vocals (2010 – present)
- Nomy Agranson – guitars, basses, vocals, keyboards (2002 – present)
- Svetoslav Bogdanov – drums (2010 – present)

Previous

- Doran Usher – keyboards (2002 – 2011)
- Vlad MJ Whiner – vocals (2003 – 2008)
- Cat Heady – drums (2003 – 2008)
- Maxim Sivkov – drums (2008)
- Mikhail Muhachev – bass (2008)

Guest

- Vladimir Rastorguev – viola, cello
- Dmitry Ulyashev – saxophone, flute
- Alla Izverskaya – backing vocals
- Alexander Vetkhov – drums
- Nail Maxonov – drums

== Discography ==
Demos

- Integral Symphony (2002, demo EP, self-release)

Studio albums

- Close Grip (2003, LP, CD, self-released)
- 2nd Hands (2007, LP CD, Unicorn Digital)
- The World Unreal (2016, LP, CD, ArtBeat Music)

Reissues

- Close Grip (2008, LP, reissue, at Russia MALS Rec., other countries — Unicorn Digital)
- The Gourishankar Anthology. 1st Decade (2015, 2CD-BOX deluxe edition, ArtBeat Music, Russia)
- 2nd Hands (2015, vinyl edition, ArtBeat Music, Russia)
- Close Grip (2015, club edition, ArtBeat Music, Russia)
- 2nd Hands (2015, club edition, ArtBeat Music, Russia)
- The World Unreal (2016, club edition, ArtBeat Music, Russia)
