= Mystery (band) =

Canadian rock band

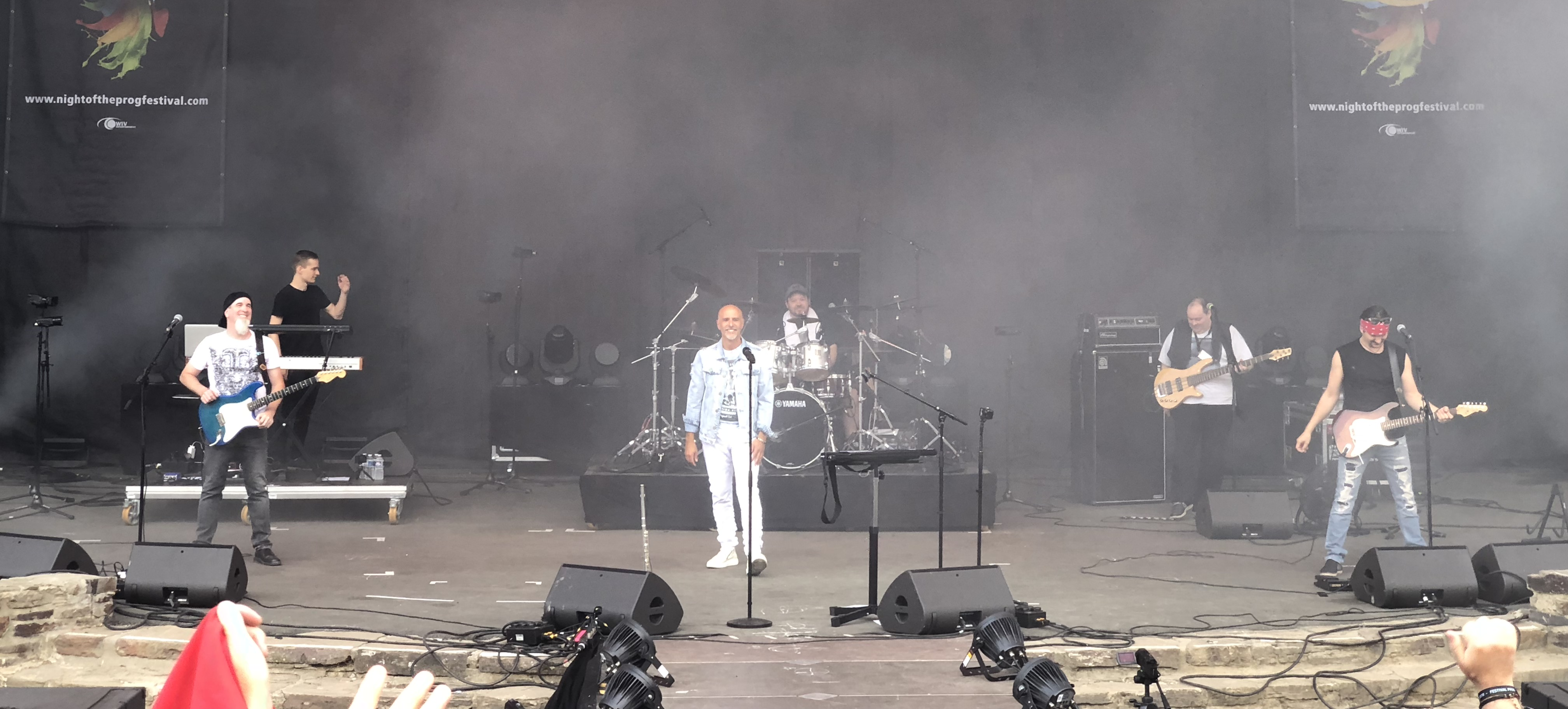
- Mystery at the 2018 Night Of The Prog Festival

Background information
- Origin: Montreal, Quebec, Canada
- Genres: Symphonic rock; hard rock; progressive rock
- Years active: 1986–present
- Labels: PAGI; Unicorn Digital; Musea Records
- Members: Michel St-Père; François Fournier; Sylvain Moineau; Jean-Sébastien Goyette; Jean Pageau; Antoine Michaud
- Past members: Sylvain Desharnais; Raymond Savoie; Stéphane Perreault; Benoît Dupuis; Gary Savoie; Richard Addison; Patrick Bourque; Michel Painchaud; Steve Gagné; Anne Charbonneau; Benoît David
- Website: therealmystery.com

Mystery (often stylized as MYSTERY) is a Canadian rock band formed in 1986 by multi-instrumentalist Michel St-Père. The band released their eponymous debut EP in 1992 with Raymond and Gary Savoie on lead vocals, followed by their first album Theatre of the Mind in 1996 and then Destiny? in 1998, both with Gary on lead vocals. In 2007, the band released their third album Beneath the Veil of Winter's Face with singer Benoît David who would record two more studio albums with the band: One Among the Living in 2010 and The World is a Game in 2012. In 2015, the band released their sixth album and first with current singer Jean Pageau Delusion Rain, followed by Lies and Butterflies in 2018 and Redemption on May 15, 2023.

Mystery's current line-up is Michel St-Père, bassist François Fournier, guitarist Sylvain Moineau, drummer Jean-Sébastien Goyette, singer Jean Pageau, and keyboardist Antoine Michaud.

== History ==
=== Formation and first three albums (1986–1999) ===
In 1986, while working at Studio Illusion as a sound engineer, Michel St-Père founded Mystery with keyboardist Sylvain Desharnais. The band was originally named Century, but was renamed to Mystery at the suggestion of Desharnais' girlfriend when it was discovered there was a band in France already called Century. It took several years for a stable lineup to form, but by 1990 a lineup formed featuring St-Père on guitars, along with Stéphane Perreault on drums, Raymond Savoie on vocals, and Benoît Dupuis on keyboards. In 1991, the band began recording their first EP. Richard Addison joined the band in 1991 on bass and Gary Savoie, Raymond's brother, became the lead singer in winter of that year. Mystery released their debut EP in May 1992 with both Raymond and Gary on vocals.

Perreault was taken ill with a crippling illness in 1991 which led to a hiatus until autumn of 1993, at which point the band regrouped. Recording started on the band's first full-length album Theatre of the Mind in late 1994. After finishing his parts for the album, Addison left the band and was replaced by Patrick Bourque, who had played bass on "Rythmizomena" on Theatre of the Mind. Michel Painchaud also joined the band on saxophone and acoustic guitar. In 1995, the band was reduced to four members when Dupuis and Painchaud left. To help promote the new album's release in 1996, St-Père created his own record label, Unicorn Digital, on which all of Mystery's recordings from this point onward would be released. With the release of Theatre of the Mind the band was able to reach a wider audience outside of their home in Canada.

Recording started on the band's second album Destiny? in October 1996, shortly after which Perreault left and was replaced by Steve Gagné who was introduced to the band by studio sound engineer Gilles Peltier. Destiny? was released in May 1998 and licensed to French record label Musea. After the release of Destiny? Anne Charbonneau joined the band as keyboardist and the band played concerts with music from the album. By the time it came to start work on the band's next album in 1999, singer Gary Savoie left due to musical differences.

=== Benoît David era (1999–2014) ===
After Gary Savoie left he was replaced by Benoît David, who St-Père had met after a Yes tribute gig by David's then-band Close To The Edge (named Gaïa at the time) prior to Savoie's departure from the band. For the next several years St-Père shifted his focus to expanding his record label, causing the next Mystery album to be delayed.

In 2000, Mystery released two songs: a cover of "Hey You" for a Pink Floyd tribute album and a demo of the song which would become the title track of the band's next album, Beneath the Veil of Winter's Face for a progressive rock compilation album. Mystery also released the compilation album At the Dawn of a New Millennium, marking a transition period in the band. Over the next few years progress was made on the band's next studio album, with a rough mix of the song "As I Am" appearing on the 2004 compilation album Prog-résiste. Then in 2006, Mystery released a cover of "Visions of Paradise" on a The Moody Blues tribute album.

The band's third studio album Beneath the Veil of Winter's Face was released on May 15, 2007. Bourque died a few months after the album's release in September 2007, the cause of death was determined to be suicide. He was also a member of Emerson Drive up until a month before his death. Following the passing of Bourque, St-Père, David, and Gagné soldiered on. They hired François Fournier to replace Bourque on bass, brought second guitarist Dean Baldwin to the fold, and former keyboard player Benoît Dupuis rejoined the band in his original role.

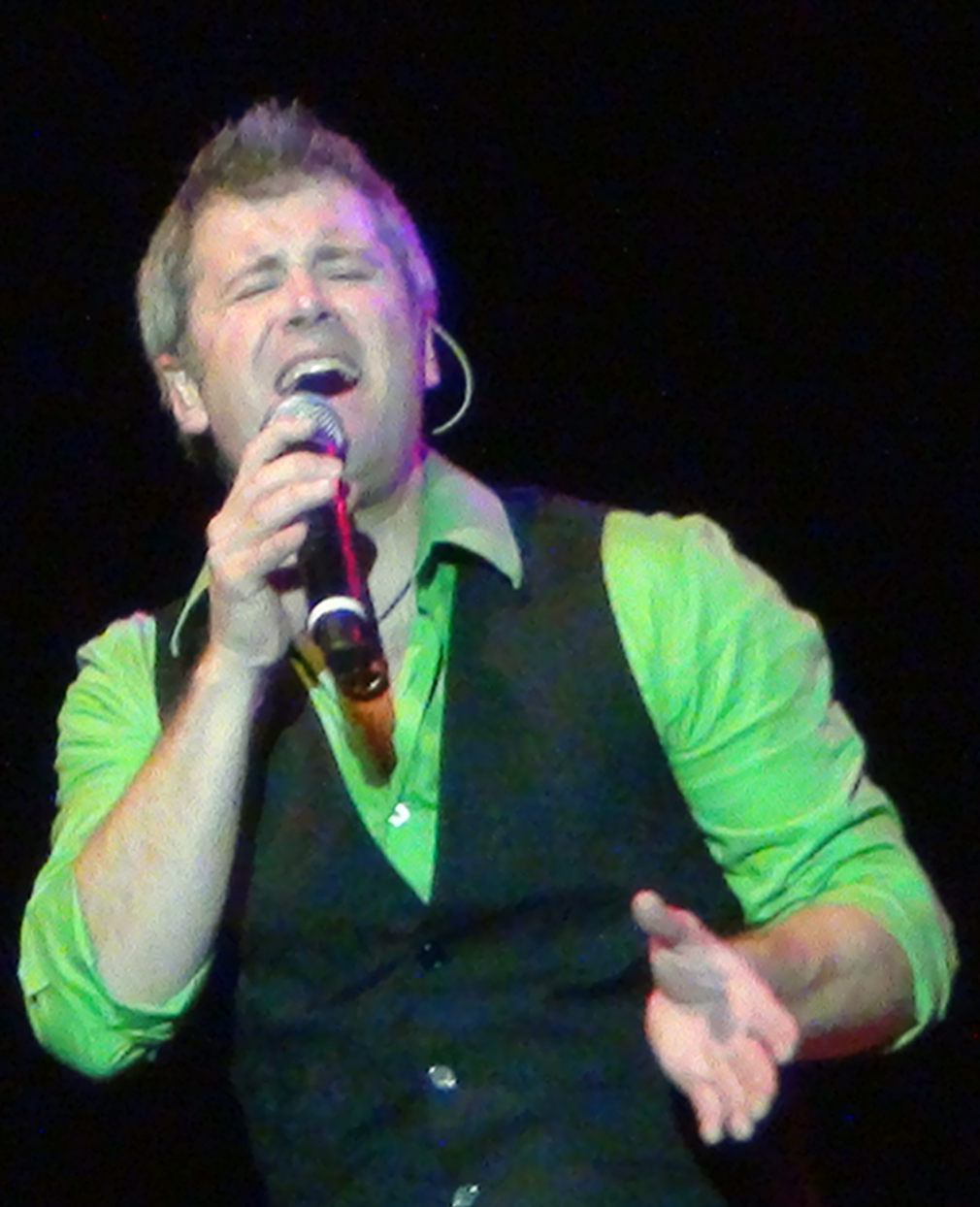
David performing with Yes in 2010

In 2008, David became the lead singer of Yes (until 2012), filling in for Jon Anderson, while continuing to be the lead singer for Mystery. While this helped the band reach a wider audience, it also caused Mystery to have to work around Yes' schedule.

Destiny?, Mystery's second album, was remixed and released with new artwork and a bonus track as a 10th anniversary edition in 2009. The new lineup also played their first show, opening for The Musical Box on April 3.

In 2010, the band released their fourth studio album, One Among the Living. Many other musicians played on the album as session musicians, including other artists who released music on Unicorn Digital and other musicians, including Oliver Wakeman, David's bandmate in Yes, and Genesis guitarist Daryl Stuermer.

Gagné departed the band in 2011 as he was unavailable to do the recording for the upcoming album, but stayed with the band as a touring member. Nick D'Virgilio was named to be the session musician who would record all the drum tracks on their next album and Antoine Fafard from Spaced Out would record all the bass tracks on the album. On July 28, 2012, Sylvain Moineau was announced to be filling in for Baldwin on guitars for their next show and then became a full-time touring member. Mystery released their fifth studio album, The World is a Game, on August 10, 2012.

On January 2, 2013, it was announced that Jean-Sébastien Goyette would be playing drums in the live band instead of Gagné, with his first show being the February 7 show at Centrepointe Theatre.

A remastered version of At the Dawn of a New Millennium was announced on February 26 along with Unveil the Mystery, a new compilation album containing music from 2007 until 2012, for which the name for was announced on March 12.

On May 10, the band played and recorded their first European show in the Netherlands during their tour supporting The World is a Game which was released as the double live album, Tales from the Netherlands, on October 1, 2014.

The band recorded the Gene Simmons song "See You Tonite" for the Kiss tribute album A World With Heroes. Todd Farhood sang lead vocals while the rest of Mystery (St-Père, Dupuis, Fournier, Moineau and Goyette) played their respective instruments.

=== Jean Pageau era (2014–present) ===
On March 14, 2014, it was announced that David had left the band the prior autumn after having discussed wanting to take a pause from music before the start of The World is a Game Tour. Jean Pageau, who was in attendance at the Saga concert Mystery opened in February 2013, officially became lead singer on March 9.

On July 7, Antoine Michaud was announced to be filling in for Sylvain Moineau for all 2014 concerts, and that he had already been practicing with the band for a month. In August and September, the band toured a second leg of concerts supporting The World is a Game taking place in Canada and Europe.

On November 2, it was announced recording had started on the next studio album. On June 9, 2015, the title for the album was announced to be Delusion Rain, and was subsequently released on November 1. From late September to early November the band toured in Canada and Europe.

On April 3, 2016, the band played in the Progdreams V festival in the Netherlands, which was recorded and released as Second Home on DVD on August 7, 2017, and as live album on August 15, 2017, digitally, and September 1, 2017, on CD.

On September 2, 2016, the band played in the 2Days Prog + 1 festival in Italy. On September 5 Michaud was announced to be the new keyboard player for the band after Dupuis left the band following the Progdreams V concert in April.

In August and September 2017, the band toured Europe and Canada for the tenth anniversary of Beneath the Veil of Winter's Face, playing the album in its entirety.

It was announced on September 7 that the band would release their 7th studio album on July 14, 2018, the same day they would play at the Night of the Prog Festival in Sankt Goarshausen, Germany. In late April and early May 2018, the band took a break from working on the album to tour Europe. Work resumed on the album after returning, and on May 30 the title was announced to be Lies and Butterflies. In March and April 2019 the band toured in support of the album with dates in Canada and Europe, followed by a second leg in October and November in Europe and Canada. The show on April 7 in Poznań, Poland was released as a double live album on November 15.

The concert at Cultuurpodium Boerderij on November 17, 2018 was released on November 28, 2020, entitled Caught in the Whirlwind of Time.

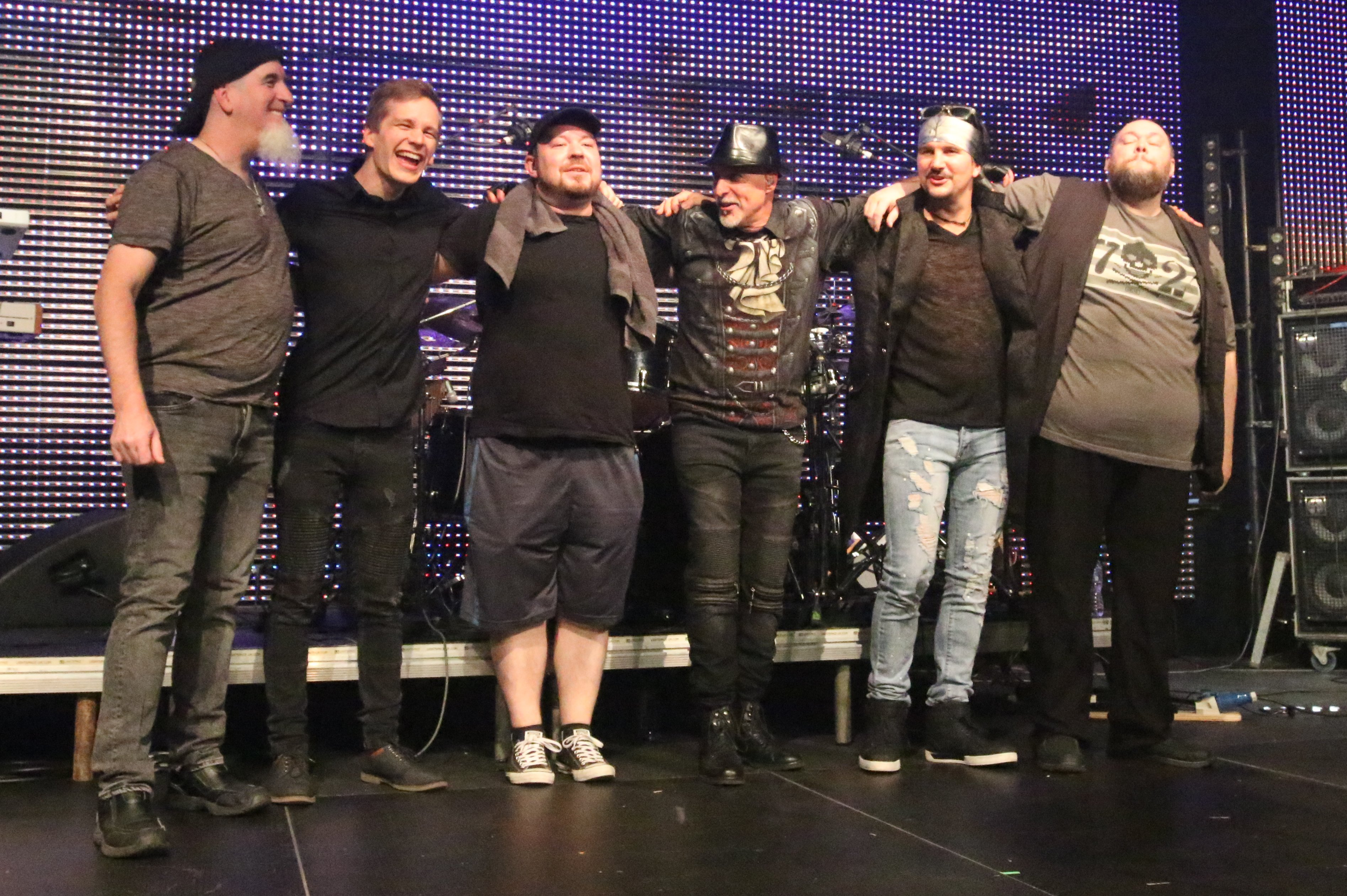
Mystery, October 2019

After over two years of being unable to tour, the band played two shows in Europe at the end of June 2022 in Germany and at the Midsummer Prog Festival in the Netherlands while working on a new album. On June 16 it was announced Johnny Maz of Huis, which St-Père is also a member of, would be filling in for Michaud for the two shows. The band returned to Europe in November to tour. Maz continued to fill in for Micahud for these shows.

In March and April 2023, the band toured in Canada and Europe performing new music from their upcoming album Redemption which was released on May 15, 2023. The first single "Behind the Mirror" was released on October 26, 2022, followed by "Redemption" on April 7, 2023. In the summer of 2024 the band played several dates, including at the Festival d'été de Québec, followed by several more in November.

In the spring of 2025, the band released a new compilation album, More than Just a Game, containing music from Delusion Rain, Lies and Butterflies, and Redemption.

In the fall of 2025, the band toured in commemoration of the 10th anniversary of Delusion Rain. Maz filled in for Michaud again on this tour.

The band is currently working on a new album and as of November 2026 writing has almost been completed.

== Personnel ==
=== Members ===
Current members

- Michel St-Père – guitars, keyboards, bass (1986–present)
- François Fournier – bass (2014–present; touring musician 2008–2014)
- Sylvain Moineau – guitars (2014–present; touring musician 2012–2014; hiatus 2014)
- Jean-Sébastien Goyette – drums (2014–present; touring musician 2013–2014)
- Jean Pageau – lead vocals, flute (2014–present)
- Antoine Michaud – keyboards (2016–present; hiatus 2022, 2025), guitars (touring musician 2014)

Former members

- Sylvain Desharnais – keyboards (1986–19??)
- Raymond Savoie – lead vocals (1988–1991)
- Stéphane Perreault – drums (1989–1996; died 2005)
- Benoît Dupuis – keyboards (1990–1995, 2014–2016; touring musician 2008–2014)
- Gary Savoie – lead vocals (1991–1999)
- Richard Addison – bass (1991–1994)
- Patrick Bourque – bass (1994–2002, 2007; died 2007)
- Michel Painchaud – acoustic guitars, saxophone (1994–1995)
- Steve Gagné – drums (1996–2011; touring musician 2011–2013)
- Anne Charbonneau – keyboards (1998–1999)
- Benoît David – lead vocals (1999–2013)

Former touring musicians

- Dean Baldwin – guitars (2008–2012)
- Olivier Martin – bass (March 22, 2013)
- Johnny Maz – keyboards (2022, 2025)

== Discography ==
Studio albums

- Theatre of the Mind (1996)
- Destiny? (1998)
- Beneath the Veil of Winter's Face (2007)
- One Among the Living (2010)
- The World is a Game (2012)
- Delusion Rain (2015)
- Lies and Butterflies (2018)
- Redemption (2023)

EPs

- Mystery (1992)

Compilations

- At the Dawn of a New Millennium (2000)
- Unveil the Mystery (2013)
- More than Just a Game (2025)

Live albums

- Tales from the Netherlands (2014)
- Second Home (2017)
- Live in Poznan (2019)
- Caught in the Whirlwind of Time (2020)

Videos

- Second Home (2017)
- Caught in the Whirlwind of Time (2020)

Appearances

- Signs Of Life: A Tribute To Pink Floyd (2000)
- Higher And Higher: A Tribute To The Moody Blues (2006)
- A World With Heroes: A Tribute to Kiss (2013)
