= Destiny? =

1998 studio album by Mystery

Studio album by Mystery
- Released: May 1998
- Genres: Symphonic rock, hard rock, progressive rock
- Length: 56:37
- Labels: Unicorn Records, Musea Records
- Producer: Michel St-Père

Mystery chronology
| Theatre of the Mind (1996) | Destiny? (1998) | Beneath the Veil of Winter's Face (2007) |

Destiny? is the second studio album by the Canadian rock band Mystery. Released in 1998, it is the last Mystery album to feature Gary Savoie on lead vocals, as well as the first to feature Patrick Bourque as a member of the band on bass and Steve Gagné on drums. Destiny? was reissued in 2009 as a 10th anniversary edition with a new mix, a bonus track and new artwork.

== Production ==
=== Background ===
Mystery's lineup changed drastically from their previous album Theatre of the Mind, having only two of the same members: guitarist Michel St-Père and singer Gary Savoie. Bassist Richard Addison left the band in 1994 after finishing his parts for Theatre of the Mind and was replaced by Patrick Bourque, who played as a session musician on the album. Keyboardist Benoît Dupuis and acoustic guitarist and saxophonist Michel Painchaud left the band in 1995, leaving the band with four members. Then, drummer Stéphane Perreault left during the recording sessions for Destiny?. Gilles Peltier, the owner of a studio at which Mystery was recording, knew Steve Gagné and suggested him as at least a temporary replacement for Perreault so the current album could be finished. Gagné was given three songs to learn in a short period of time and when his recording of the tracks was heard it impressed St-Père and Savoie very much, leading Gagné to become a full-time member of the band.

=== Recording ===
Two songs were recorded during the recording sessions for the album that did not appear on its original release: "Heaven Can Wait" and "Beneath the Veil of Winter's Face". "Heaven Can Wait" was released as a bonus track on the 10th Anniversary Edition of the album in 2009 while "Beneath the Veil of Winter's Face" became the title track of the band's next album.

=== Cover art ===
The original cover design was done by Mystery's previous drummer Stéphane Perreault. When the album was rereleased in 2009 it was given new artwork, with the photograph from the original release being displayed on the television screen.

== Track listing ==
| No. | Title | Writer(s) | Length |
|---|---|---|---|
| 1. | "Legend" | Michel St-Père | 2:40 |
| 2. | "Destiny?" | Michel St-Père | 4:55 |
| 3. | "Slave to Liberty" | Michel St-Père | 5:35 |
| 4. | "Before the Dawn" | Michel St-Père, Gary Savoie | 6:28 |
| 5. | "Queen of Vajra Space" | Michel St-Père | 9:20 |
| 6. | "The Mourning Man" | Michel St-Père | 4:46 |
| 7. | "Submerged" | Michel St-Père, Dré | 7:52 |
| 8. | "Shadow of the Lake" | Michel St-Père, Dré | 14:51 |

10th Anniversary Edition bonus track
| No. | Title | Writer(s) | Length |
|---|---|---|---|
| 9. | "Heaven Can Wait" | Michel St-Père | 6:53 |

== Personnel ==
Mystery

- Gary Savoie - lead vocals
- Michel St-Père - guitars, keyboards
- Patrick Bourque - bass
- Steve Gagné - drums

Additional musicians

- Diane Hébert - back vocals on 'Queen of Vajra Space'
- Olivier Demers - violin
- Serge Gangloff - special FX
- Dré - strange personalities
- Anne Gangloff - French narration
- Kiwi - the dog

== Release information ==
- CD - Unicorn Records - UNCR-2030 - 1998
- CD - Musea Records - FGBG 4259 - 1998
- CD - Unicorn Digital - UNCR-5060 - 2009
