= David Mark Pearce =

- Born: 23 May 1972 (age 54)
- Origin: Penzance, England
- Occupations: Instrumentalist, songwriter, sound engineer, record producer
- Instrument: Guitar
- Formerly of: Naked Feet

David Mark Pearce (born 23 May 1972) is a British guitarist, songwriter, sound engineer and record producer.

== History ==
A native of Penzance (Cornwall, UK), David Mark Pearce began playing the guitar in earnest at the age of 15 after first learning to play the drums. His first experience as part of a band came at 18, followed by several more until he left to attend the London College of Music and Media. Upon completion, he received a diploma in Music Technology and began his career as a much sought-after engineer and producer. His band affiliations include the UK melodic indie band Union Jane and the Cornwall-based folk rock group Naked Feet. He left the group in the early 2000s.

In 2002, when one of his Allen and Heath colleagues, who was a friend of keyboardist Oliver Wakeman, asked Pearce to listen to some of Wakeman's tunes, he was impressed. He jokingly inquired as to whether Wakeman needed a guitarist, to which the answer was a surprising yes. After submitting his own work, in addition to several ideas he had for the band, he was hired. The first project that he and Wakeman worked on was the Anam Cara album mix, upon which he also contributed acoustic guitar support.

It was the first of many projects with Oliver and the band; other projects have included: mixing and electric/acoustic guitar support for the CD single "The View from Here"; mixing Oliver's last commissioned album Angels and the relaxation albums Purification by Sound and Enlightenment and Inspiration; as well as electric guitar support on the OWB’s latest release, Mother’s Ruin.

Since his debut with the band at the Oakwood Center in December 2002, his association with the band has taken many interesting twists and turns, including support work with Arjen Luccassen's band Stream of Passion, appearing at the prestigious Fordhamfest and an appearance with Oliver at one of the UK Classic Rock Society's acoustic evenings, where he showed off his talent on classical guitar. A big highlight was the 2008 performance and filming of the Coming to Town – Live in Katowice DVD and cd (Metal Mind Productions) at the Wyspianski Theater in Katowice, Poland. Of his live performances it has been stated that Pearce "through his poseur look and attitude stole the show that evening" and that he "often stole the spotlight with a colorful outfit and impressive solos". Another seminal event for Dave was supporting Steve Howe at Oliver and Lisa Wakeman's wedding reception.

Pearce wrote and recorded his own EP, 1997, which was also included on his debut album Pleasure Palace. He has been co-producer, sound engineer and provided guitar support to keyboardist Lisa LaRue on her album Lisa LaRue Project 2K9 World Class (Finger Woven Records), released in November 2009. He also co-wrote the song "There Are No Words" with LaRue for the project. His own tune on the album, "Tell Me Why", will also be included on his own melodic rock album entitled Strangeang3ls, (Pleasure Palace Records) released in 2010. John Payne provided the vocals. It will be available as an EP in November 2009, along with the EP "Shelter Me from the Rain", released earlier the same year.

== Recognition ==
David Mark Pearce was also named 2008's eighth "Best Guitarist'" by Classic Rock Society Magazine in the UK for his work with the Oliver Wakeman Band.

== Discography ==
- Strange Ang3ls (2011)
- Tell Me Why (single) (2009)
- World Class (Lisa LaRue Project 2K9) (2009)
- Shelter Me From the Rain (EP) (2009)
- Coming to Town – Live in Katowice (Oliver Wakeman Band) (Live CD) (2008)
- Coming to Town – Live in Katowice (Oliver Wakeman Band) (Live DVD) (2008)
- Mother's Ruin (Oliver Wakeman) (2005)
- The View From Here (Oliver Wakeman and Rachel) (EP)
- Enlightenment and Inspiration (Oliver Wakeman) (mixed by David Mark Pearce)
- Purification by Sound (Oliver Wakeman) (mixed by David Mark Pearce)
