= Les Classels =

Canadian band

- Years active: 1964-1971
- Past members: Michel Caron (Guitarist and singer); Jean-Clément Drouin (Guitarist); Serge Drouin (Drummer); Gilles Girard (Singer); Pierre Therrien (Bass guitar)

Les Classels was a Québécois rock 'n' roll yé-yé band active from 1964 to 1971.

== History ==
Michel Caron, Jean-Clément Drouin, Serge Drouin and Pierre Therrien were in the band Special Tones in 1960. In 1961, Gilles Girard joined them. A few years later, the group met the promoter Ben Kaye who rebranded them, creating the group Les Classels in February 1964. They often wore all white costumes: white wigs, white clothing and played white musical instruments.

The Classels' are known for their songs "Avant de me dire adieu", "Ton amour a changé ma vie", "Le sentier de neige". They were written by Ben Kaye, Lucien Brien (lyrics) and Hal Stanley (composition). Michel Caron and Jean-Clément Drouin also wrote their own songs in a style closer to yé-yé. Les Classels also performed songs by English-speaking bands.

The Classels started the trend of singer-instrumentalist bands in Quebec. They were named best band of the year at the 1965 Gala des artistes. They appeared on American television and performed in Cleveland and Atlantic City. In 1966, they started working with Paul Anka, who wrote songs for them. In 1967, the Classels went on the Musicorama tour and filmed an internationally-broadcast television show about Canadian artists on the site of Expo 67.

In early 1968, they stopped wearing white clothing and white wigs. They published their last album in 1969, earning a trophy at the Festival du disque for its sales figures, and then separated in 1971. It was the most popular Quebec yé-yé group.

The group reformed in 1977 under the name Gilles Girard et les Super Classels.

== Discography ==
Singles
Year	Title
1964	Cette chanson-là/En marchant sur la plage
1964	Avant de me dire adieu/Oui c’est toi
1964	Ton amour a changé ma vie/Tu le regretteras
1964	Le sentier de neige/Jolies clochettes
1965	Qu’est devenu notre passé/Mon premier amour
1965	Please Wait For Me/Before You Say Goodbye
1965	Tomorrow May Be Too Late
1965	N’attendons pas qu’il soit trop tard/Viens au soleil
1965	Les révoltés/Je chante avec mon coeur
1965	Tu le regretteras—Ton amour a changé ma vie/Avant de me dire adieu—Mon premier amour
1966	Le vent de la nuit/On dit que l’on sait
1966	Et maintenant/Est-ce toi que j’aime
1966	Exodus/Lana
1966	Les soirs d’hiver/Chaque fois que la neige
1967	Le monde a rendez-vous à Montréal/Everybody’s Coming To Montreal
1967	Io per te darei la mia vita/A che cosa serve piangere d’amor
1967	Je l’ai fait pour toi/Je dois partir
1967	Un peu d’espoir, un peu de foi/Faut pas pleurer pour ça
1967	Lorsque j’entends/Les enfants du destin
1968	Les trois cloches/Perdu
1968	Mes jeunes années/Je m’éveille
1968	Dalila/L’amour est bleu
1969	C’est toi/Cet amour
1969	En marchant sur la plage/Cette chanson-là
1970	Si j’étais millionnaire/Lorsque l’amour s’en va
1970	Le temps de l’amour/Goodbye My Darling
1970	L’herbe de la paix/Je te fais l’amour
1970	Je me demande si tu m’aimes/Tu n’avais rien compris
1971	Ton amour a changé ma vie/Le sentier de neige
1971	Avant de me dire adieu—Ton amour a changé ma vie/La montagne des amoureux—Le train des amoureux
1971	Et maintenant—Exodus/Lorsque j’attends—Les enfants du destin
1971	Les trois cloches—Je m’éveille/Dalila—L’amour est bleu
1971	En marchant sur la plage/Si j’étais millionnaire
1971	Le sentier de neige—Jolies clochettes/Chaque fois que la neige—Les soirs d’hiver
1974	Ton amour a changé ma vie/Lana
1974	Avant de me dire adieu/Le sentier de neige
1974	Qu’est devenu notre passé/Les révoltés
1974	Exodus/En marchant sur la plage
1974	N’attendons pas qu’il soit trop tard/Et maintenant
1974	Les trois cloches/Tu le regretteras

Albums
Year	Title
1964	Les Classels
1965	Les Classels en spectacle
1966	Et maintenant...les Classels
1966	Blanc sur neige
1968	Les Classels (en couleurs)
1968	Les Classels au Théâtre des Variétés
1968	Les Classels
1970?	Album souvenir
1974	21 disques d’or
1976?	Les plus belles mélodies
1991	Les Classels, volume I
1992	Les Classels, volume 2
