= The World Is a Game =

2012 studio album by Mystery

The World is a Game

Studio album by Mystery
- Released: August 10, 2012
- Recorded: 2011–2012
- Genre: Symphonic rock, hard rock, progressive rock
- Length: 59:58
- Label: Unicorn Digital
- Producer: Michel St-Père

Mystery chronology
| One Among the Living (2010) | The World is a Game (2012) | Delusion Rain (2015) |

The World is a Game is the fifth studio album by the Canadian rock band Mystery, which by this point consisted of a duo of Michel St-Père and Benoît David. It is the last studio release with David before his departure the following year.

== Production ==
Professional ratings
Review scores
| Source | Rating |
|---|---|
| Métro | 3/5 stars |
| Prog | 3.5/5 stars |
| Rock Hard | 6/10 stars |

=== Background ===
Long time drummer Steve Gagné left the band in 2011, causing Mystery founder Michel St-Père to find a new drummer. While Nick D'Virgilio was working with Cirque du Soleil in Canada, St-Père contacted him about recording the drum tracks for the album as a session musician, to which he agreed. Antoine Fafard, who had worked previously with Mystery as a session musician, recorded the bass tracks and additional acoustic guitars. Marilène Provencher-Leduc played all of the flutes on the album. David Myers of The Musical Box was going to play keyboards on the album, but ultimately did not.

=== Recording ===
Work was started on The World is a Game immediately after One Among the Living was released. Recording for the album was done in three studios. D'Virgilio's drum tracks were recorded at Chemical Sound in Toronto on October 3 and 4 2011, Fafard's bass and acoustic guitars were recorded at his own studio, Inhus Studio, in England, with the rest of the recording being done at St-Père's/Serge Gangloff's Studio Illusion III.

Recording on the album continued while David was on tour with Yes; David and St-Père would discuss the album over the phone and David would receive MP3s as work progressed so he could make suggestions.

With the exception of two pieces which originated years prior, "A Morning Rise" and "Dear Someone", all of the music on the album was brand new material written shortly after the release of One Among the Living.

=== Cover art ===
The cover art for the album was done by Polish photographer Leszek Bujnowski, and is entitled Rainy Circus.

== Track listing ==
| No. | Title | Writer(s) | Length |
|---|---|---|---|
| 1. | "A Morning Rise" | Michel St-Père | 1:18 |
| 2. | "Pride" | Michel St-Père | 11:28 |
| 3. | "Superstar" | Michel St-Père | 6:59 |
| 4. | "The Unwinding of Time" | Michel St-Père | 0:49 |
| 5. | "The World is a Game" | Michel St-Père, Benoît David | 7:57 |
| 6. | "Dear Someone" | Michel St-Père, Benoît David | 6:21 |
| 7. | "Time Goes By" | Michel St-Père | 6:04 |
| 8. | "Another Day" | Michel St-Père | 19:02 |

Vinyl additional tracks
| No. | Title | Writer(s) | Length |
|---|---|---|---|
| 7. | "Dear Someone (live version)" (Recorded Live on May 10th 2013 at Boerderij Cultuurpodium) | Michel St-Père, Benoît David | 6:52 |
| 8. | "Another Day (live version)" (Recorded Live on May 10th 2013 at Boerderij Cultuurpodium) | Michel St-Père | 19:24 |

== Personnel ==
Mystery

- Benoît David - vocals
- Michel St-Père - electric and acoustic guitars, keyboards

Additional musicians

- Antoine Fafard - fretted and fretless bass, acoustic guitars
- Nick D'Virgilio - drums
- Marilène Provencher-Leduc - flute

== Release information ==
- CD - Unicorn Digital - UNCR-5090 - 2012
- CD - Disk Union - DUPG133 - 2012
- Vinyl - Oskar - 006/007LP - 2018
