= Ravens & Lullabies =

Studio album by Gordon Giltrap and Oliver Wakeman
- Released: 4 March 2013
- Genre: Rock
- Label: Esoteric Antenna
- Producer: Oliver Wakeman

Ravens & Lullabies is a studio album by Gordon Giltrap and Oliver Wakeman.

Giltrap also worked with Oliver's father Rick Wakeman on the album From Brush and Stone three years prior.

== Track listing ==
No.	Title	Length
1.	"Moneyfacturing"	4:10
2.	"Fiona's Smile"	3:01
3.	"From the Turn of a Card"	3:47
4.	"LJW"	4:08
5.	"Maybe Tomorrow"	3:26
6.	"Wherever There Was Beauty"	2:40
7.	"Is This the Last Song I Write?"	10:02
8.	"A Mayfair Kiss"	2:55
9.	"Anyone Can Fly"	4:48
10.	"A Perfect Day"	2:41
11.	"Credit Carnival"	5:38
12.	"One for Billie"	2:11
13.	"Ravens Will Fly Away"	4:40

Bonus Disc
No.	Title	Length
1.	"Nature's Way" (live)	5:42
2.	"Isabella's Wedding" (live)	4:19
3.	"Progress of the Soul" (live)	4:44
4.	"On Camber Sands" (live)	3:59
5.	"Lutey and the Mermaid" (live)	2:55
6.	"Praeludium"	4:51
7.	"The Forgotten King"	3:02
8.	"Roots"	4:30

== Personnel ==
- Oliver Wakeman - piano, keyboards and backing vocals
- Gordon Giltrap - acoustic and electric guitars
- Paul Manzi - vocals
- Benoît David - vocals
- Steve Amadeo - bass guitar
- Johanne James - drums and percussion
