= Theatre of the Mind (Mystery album) =

1996 studio album by Mystery

Studio album by Mystery
- Released: March 1996
- Genre: Symphonic rock, hard rock
- Length: 47:06
- Label: Unicorn Records
- Producer: Michel St-Père

Mystery chronology
Mystery (1992)	Theatre of the Mind (1996)	Destiny? (1998)

Theatre of the Mind is the first studio album by the Canadian rock band Mystery, released in 1996. It is also the first album to be released on Michel St-Père's record label Unicorn Records, which was created to promote this album. There was a major lineup shift following the release of this album: it is the only album to feature Richard Addison, Stéphane Perreault, and Michel Painchaud, as well as the only album until 2010 to feature Benoît Dupuis.

A remix of the album was released in October 2018 which includes a bonus track.

== Release ==
=== Reissues ===
When the album was first reissued in 1998 the composition of the artwork was redone by drummer Stéphane Perreault, changing the setting to a desert. The music remained unchanged.

When the 16 track 2 inch master tapes were transferred to digital files for the 2018 edition of the album, two additional songs were on the tapes that were not released on the original album: a rerecorded version of "Heart of Stone", which was included as a bonus track on the rerelease, and another recording of "In my Dreams", both of which were originally recorded for the Mystery EP.

The album was also released on vinyl by Oskar records.

== Track listing ==
The Reality
No.	Title	Writer(s)	Length
1.	"Theatre of the Mind"	Michel St-Père	6:07
2.	"Lonely Heart"	Michel St-Père	4:31
3.	"Peace of Mind"	Michel St-Père	4:50

The Dream
No.	Title	Writer(s)	Length
4.	"Virtual Mentality"	Benoît Dupuis	1:16
5.	"The Inner Journey - Part I"	Michel St-Père	3:39
6.	"Black Roses"	Michel St-Père	8:06
7.	"Rythmizomena"	Stéphane Perreault, Michel St-Père	1:51
8.	"In my Dreams"	Michel St-Père	5:28
9.	"Believe in your Dreams"	Michel St-Père, Stéphane Perreault, Sylvain Desharnais	6:43
10.	"The Inner Journey - Part II"	Michel St-Père	4:35

2018 Edition bonus track
No.	Title	Writer(s)	Length
11.	"Heart of Stone"	Michel St-Père	3:27

== Personnel ==
Mystery

- Gary Savoie - lead and background vocals
- Michel St-Père - electric guitar, 6 & 12 string guitars, classical guitar and synthesizers
- Stéphane Perreault - drums, percussion, drum programming, glockenspiel and synthesizers
- Benoît Dupuis - keyboards
- Michel Painchaud - classical and acoustic guitars
- Richard Addison - fretted and fretless bass guitars

Additional musicians

- Patrick Bourque - bass
- Patrice Bédard - keyboard
- Sylvain Langlois - tenor and soprano saxophones
- Pierre Léger - flutes
- Josée Larivière - background vocals
- Marie-Claude Masse - violin
- Marie Lacasse - violin
- Ahimsa Gilbert - cello
- Serge Gangloff - special FX synthesizer
- Gilles Peltier - special FX and synthesizer programming

== Release information ==
- CD - Unicorn Records - UNCR-2002 - 1996
- CD - Unicorn Records - UNCR-2020 - 1998
- CD - Unicorn Digital - UNCR-5122 - 2018
- Vinyl - Oskar - 012LP - 2019
