= Antoine Fafard =

Canadian-British bassist, guitarist, and composer

- Origin: Montreal, Quebec, Canada
- Genres: Jazz fusion; Progressive rock
- Occupations: Musician; composer; producer
- Instruments: Bass guitar; classical guitar; electric guitar
- Years active: 1998–present
- Website: antoinefafard.com

Antoine Fafard is a Canadian–British jazz fusion bassist, guitarist and composer. He founded the progressive fusion group Spaced Out, which released several albums between 2000 and 2008. Since 2011, he has released a sequence of solo albums noted for their complex rhythmic structures and collaborations with drummers such as Terry Bozzio, Simon Phillips, Dave Weckl, Vinnie Colaiuta, Chad Wackerman, and Gavin Harrison.

== Early life ==
Fafard was born in Montreal, Quebec, Canada. He began musical training on piano at age nine and classical guitar at age eleven before switching to bass guitar in his mid-teens. He studied music at the collegiate and university levels, focusing on composition and transcription.

== Career ==
Fafard began his career as leader of the progressive fusion group Spaced Out, active during the 2000s. Since 2011 he has released a series of solo and collaborative instrumental albums recorded with jazz and progressive rock musicians.

=== Spaced Out (1998–2008) ===
Formed in 1998, Spaced Out was led by Fafard through a series of progressive fusion albums released between 2000 and 2008. The ensemble operated as an instrumental project centred on Fafard’s compositions, combining elements of jazz fusion and progressive rock across its recorded output.

=== Solo career (2011–present) ===
Fafard began his solo discography with Solus Operandi (2011). A central feature of his subsequent catalogue is the composition of material tailored to the stylistic strengths of specific guest drummers.

His 2013 release, Occultus Tramitis, featured contributions from Terry Bozzio, Simon Phillips, Dave Weckl, Chad Wackerman, and violinist Jerry Goodman. This was followed by Ad Perpetuum (2014), which included performances by Vinnie Colaiuta and guitarist Jerry De Villiers Jr.

Fafard has worked extensively with Gavin Harrison. Their first duo album, Chemical Reactions (2020), incorporated orchestral instrumentation. A follow-up, Perpetual Mutations (2024), added classical guitar, piano, and cello, and was praised in UK Jazz News for its “eclectic musical choices”.

In 2022, Fafard launched Alta Forma, a vocal-oriented progressive rock project featuring JK Harrison and drummer Todd Sucherman.

== Musical style ==
Reviewers have described Fafard’s music as a hybrid of jazz-rock and progressive rock. Commentators have highlighted his use of complex rhythmic structures, prominent bass lines and tightly structured compositions that still leave room for improvisation. Pete Feenstra of Get Ready to ROCK! compared his work to that of the Mahavishnu Orchestra and Allan Holdsworth. Reviews of his later albums note an expanded stylistic palette incorporating classical guitar, orchestral textures, and multi-instrumental performance.

== Critical reception ==
Fafard’s solo work has attracted attention from specialist music press. In 2025 Modern Drummer ran a feature on his compositional approach and collaborations with drummers such as Terry Bozzio, Vinnie Colaiuta, Chad Wackerman and Gavin Harrison. Prog reviewed Quadra Spherium, describing it as a fusion of jazz-rock and progressive rock instrumentation, and Modern Drummer covered the album in its “New Releases” section. All About Jazz has reviewed several of his releases, including Occultus Tramitis and Ad Perpetuum, while London Jazz News, Progressive Rock Central, UK Jazz News and Get Ready to ROCK! have reviewed albums such as Sphère, Borromean Odyssey and Perpetual Mutations.

== Discography ==
=== Solo and collaborative albums ===
Year	Title	Label	Notes / Collaborators
2011	Solus Operandi	Unicorn Digital	Solo debut
2013	Occultus Tramitis	Unicorn Digital	Featuring Terry Bozzio, Jerry Goodman, and Dave Weckl
2014	Ad Perpetuum	Unicorn Digital	Featuring Vinnie Colaiuta
2016	Sphère	Timeless Momentum	Featuring Gary Husband
2017	Proto Mundi	Timeless Momentum	Featuring Simon Phillips and Jerry Goodman
2019	Borromean Odyssey	Timeless Momentum	Featuring Todd Sucherman
2020	Chemical Reactions	Harmonic Heresy	Duo with Gavin Harrison
2022	Spatium & Tempus	Timeless Momentum	As Alta Forma
2024	Perpetual Mutations	Harmonic Heresy	Duo with Gavin Harrison
2025	Quadra Spherium	Timeless Momentum	Featuring Gary Husband and Jean-Pierre Zanella
2025	Trajectory	Timeless Momentum	As Alta Forma

=== With Spaced Out ===
- Spaced Out (2000)
- Eponymus II (2001)
- Slow Gin (2003)
- Unstable Matter (2006)
- Live at the Crescendo Festival (2007)
- Evolution (2008)
