= Unicorn Digital =

Canadian record label

Unicorn Digital Inc.
- Founded: 1996
- Founder: Michel St-Père
- Status: Active
- Distributors: Outside Music (Canada); Code 7 (Europe)
- Genre: Progressive rock, heavy metal, jazz fusion
- Country of origin: Canada
- Location: Lorraine, Quebec
- Official website: www.unicorndigital.net

Unicorn Digital is an independent Canadian record label founded in 1996 by Michel St-Père. The label was originally created to promote his band Mystery, however since its founding the label has expanded to include many more artists. In 2005, the label changed its name from Unicorn Records to Unicorn Digital.

== Artists ==
- Actionmen
- Addison Project
- Agah Bahari
- Alkemy
- Antoine Fafard
- Arz
- Bleed in Vain
- Capharnaum
- Celestial Oeuvre
- Claire Vezina
- Code 18
- Daryl Stuermer
- Dimension X
- Direction
- EKPHRASIS
- Flood
- The Gourishankar
- Hamadryad
- Heon
- Huis
- Inner Odyssey
- Jelly Fiche
- Junk Farm
- Kaos Moon
- Karcius
- Karfagen
- Kopecky
- Little King
- Marck.T
- Martin Maheux Circle
- Mystery
- Nathan Mahl
- Nil
- Ninth 9 State
- Parallel Mind
- Pictorial Wand
- Qwaarn
- Retroheads
- Rick Miller
- Ring of Myth
- Roger Powell
- Secret Society of Starfish
- Shatters
- SLP (Sebastien Lepine Project)
- Signs of One
- Snarling Adjective Convention
- Southern Cross
- Spaced Out
- Srod
- SuddenFlames
- Sympozion
- Talisma
- T.A.O.
- Trioxyde
- Unerase
- Unitopia
- Upright
- Vecteur K
- Vladimir Badirov Project
- Xinema
- Yeti Rain

== See also ==
- List of record labels
