= The Studio Albums 1969–1987 =

Box set by Yes
- Released: 6 December 2013
- Recorded: 1969–1987
- Genres: Progressive rock; pop rock
- Length: 529:00
- Label: Rhino

Yes chronology
High Vibration (2013)	The Studio Albums 1969–1987 (2013)	Heaven & Earth (2014)

Professional ratings
Review scores
Source	Rating
TheFireNote	5/5 stars

The Studio Albums 1969–1987 is a box set released by English progressive rock band Yes, released on 6 December 2013. It features the 12 studio albums released by Atlantic Records by the band, all remastered for the set in a clamshell box. The box set also features a total of 60 previously released bonus tracks. The cover for the box set was designed by long-time partner Roger Dean. The set also contains the previously only released in Japan expanded edition of Big Generator.

== Contents ==
Yes (1969)

1. “Beyond and Before” – 4:52
2. “I See You” – 6:47
3. “Yesterday and Today” – 2:49
4. “Looking Around” – 3:58
5. “Harold Land” – 5:40
6. “Every Little Thing” – 5:41
7. “Sweetness” – 4:31
8. “Survival” – 6:18
9. "Everydays (Single Version)" – 6:23
10. "Dear Father (Early Version #2)" – 5:51
11. "Something's Coming" – 7:00
12. "Everydays (Early Version)" – 5:18
13. "Dear Father (Early Version #1)" – 5:31
14. "Something's Coming (Early Version)" – 8:02

Time and a Word (1970)

1. "No Opportunity Necessary, No Experience Needed" – 4:45
2. "Then" – 5:42
3. "Everydays" – 6:05
4. "Sweet Dreams" – 3:46
5. "The Prophet" – 6:31
6. "Clear Days" – 2:03
7. "Astral Traveler" – 5:47
8. "Time and a Word" – 4:29
9. "Dear Father" – 4:12
10. "No Opportunity Necessary, No Experience Needed (Original Mix)" – 4:42
11. "Sweet Dreams (Original Mix)" – 4:19
12. "The Prophet (Single Version)" – 6:33

The Yes Album (1971)

1. "Yours Is No Disgrace" – 9:40
2. "Clap" – 3:16
3. "Starship Trooper" – 9:29
4. "I've Seen All Good People" – 6:55
5. "A Venture" – 3:20
6. "Perpetual Change" – 8:57
7. "Your Move (Single Version)" – 3:00
8. "Life Seeker (Single Version)" – 3:28
9. "Clap (Studio Version)" – 4:02

Fragile (1971)

1. "Roundabout" – 8:29
2. "Cans and Brahms" – 1:34
3. "We Have Heaven" – 1:38
4. "South Side of the Sky" – 7:57
5. "Five Per Cent for Nothing" – 0:35
6. "Long Distance Runaround" – 3:28
7. "The Fish (Schindleria Praematurus)" – 2:36
8. "Mood for a Day" – 2:55
9. "Heart of the Sunrise" – 11:16
10. "America" – 10:33
11. "Roundabout (Early Rough Mix)" – 8:35

Close to the Edge (1972)

1. "Close to the Edge" – 18:43
2. "And You and I" – 10:12
3. "Siberian Khatru" – 8:56
4. "America (Single Version)" – 4:12
5. "Total Mass Retain (Single Version)" – 3:21
6. "And You and I (Alternative Version)" – 10:17
7. "Siberia (Studio Run-Through of Siberian Khatru)" – 9:19

Tales from Topographic Oceans (1973)

1. "The Revealing Science of God (Dance of the Dawn)" – 20:27
2. "The Remembering (High the Memory)" – 20:38
3. "The Ancient (Giants Under the Sun)" – 18:34
4. "Ritual (Nous Sommes du Soleil)" – 21:35
5. "Dance of the Dawn (Studio Run-through)" – 23:35
6. "Giants Under the Sun (Studio Run-through)" – 17:17

Relayer (1974)

1. "The Gates of Delirium" – 21:55
2. "Sound Chaser" – 9:25
3. "To Be Over" – 9:08
4. "Soon (Single Edit)" – 4:18
5. "Sound Chaser (Single Edit)" – 3:13
6. "The Gates of Delirium (Studio Run-through)" – 21:16

Going for the One (1977)

1. "Going for the One" – 5:30
2. "Turn of the Century" – 7:58
3. "Parallels" – 5:52
4. "Wonderous Stories" – 3:47
5. "Awaken" – 15:38
6. "Montreaux's Theme" – 2:38
7. "Vevey (Revisited)" – 4:46
8. "Amazing Grace" – 2:36
9. "Going for the One (Rehearsal)" – 5:10
10. "Parallels (Rehearsal)" – 6:21
11. "Turn of the Century (Rehearsal)" – 6:58
12. "Eastern Numbers (Early version of "Awaken") – 12:16

Tormato (1978)

1. "Future Times"/"Rejoice" – 6:46
2. "Don't Kill the Whale" – 3:55
3. "Madrigal" – 2:21
4. "Release, Release" – 5:40
5. "Arriving UFO" – 6:02
6. "Circus of Heaven" – 4:28
7. "Onward" – 4:00
8. "On the Silent Wings of Freedom" – 7:45
9. "Abilene" – 4:02
10. "Money" – 3:15
11. "Picasso" – 2:12
12. "Some Are Born" – 5:42
13. "You Can Be Saved" – 4:20
14. "High" – 4:30
15. "Days" – 1:00
16. "Countryside" – 3:11
17. "Everybody's Song" – 6:48
18. "Onward (instrumental)" – 3:06

Drama (1980)

1. "Machine Messiah" – 10:18
2. "White Car" – 1:18
3. "Does It Really Happen?" – 6:27
4. "Into the Lens" – 8:31
5. "Run Through the Light" – 4:41
6. "Tempus Fugit" – 5:12
7. "Into the Lens (I Am a Camera) (Single Version)" – 3:47
8. "Run Through the Light (Single Version)" – 4:31
9. "Have We Really Got to Go Through This" – 3:43
10. "Song No. 4 (Satellite)" – 7:31
11. "Tempus Fugit (Tracking Session)" – 5:39
12. "White Car (Tracking Session)" – 1:11
13. "Dancing Through the Light" – 3:16
14. "Golden Age" – 5:57
15. "In the Tower" – 2:54
16. "Friend of a Friend" – 3:38

90125 (1983)

1. "Owner of a Lonely Heart" – 4:27
2. "Hold On" – 5:15
3. "It Can Happen" – 5:39
4. "Changes" – 6:16
5. "Cinema" – 2:09
6. "Leave It" – 4:10
7. "Our Song" – 4:16
8. "City of Love" – 4:48
9. "Hearts" – 7:34
10. "Leave It (single remix)" – 3:56
11. "Make It Easy" – 6:12
12. "It Can Happen (Cinema version)" – 6:05
13. "It's Over" – 5:41
14. "Owner of a Lonely Heart (Extended remix)" – 7:05
15. "Leave It ("A Capella" version)" – 3:18

Big Generator (1987)

1. "Rhythm of Love" – 4:49
2. "Big Generator" – 4:31
3. "Shoot High Aim Low" – 6:59
4. "Almost Like Love" – 4:58
5. "Love Will Find a Way" – 4:48
6. "Final Eyes" – 6:20
7. "I'm Running" – 7:34
8. "Holy Lamb (Song for Harmonic Convergence)" – 3:15
9. "Love Will Find a Way" (edited version)" – 4:18
10. "Love Will Find a Way" (extended version)" – 7:11
11. "Rhythm of Love" (Dance to the Rhythm Mix)" – 6:55
12. "Rhythm of Love" (Move to the Rhythm Mix)" – 4:26
13. "Rhythm of Love" (The Rhythm of Dub)" – 7:50

== Personnel ==
Yes

- Jon Anderson – lead vocals, percussion, acoustic guitars, piccolo, harp, 10-string Alvarez guitar
- Peter Banks – electric and acoustic guitars, backing vocals
- Chris Squire – bass, backing vocals, electric guitars, fretless bass, 8-string bass, bass pedals, backing vocals, piano
- Tony Kaye – organ, piano, Hammond organ, moog synthesizer, electric piano
- Bill Bruford – drums, vibraphone, percussion
- Steve Howe – electric and acoustic guitars, vachalia, vocals, steel guitar, lute, mandolin
- Rick Wakeman – Keyboards, Hammond organ, grand piano, RMI 368 Electra-Piano and Harpsichord, Mellotron, Minimoog synthesiser, harpsichord
- Alan White – drums, percussion, tuned percussion, glockenspiel, crotales, cymbals, bell tree, drum synthesizer, gongs, vibraphone, backing vocals, Fairlight CMI
- Patrick Moraz – piano, electric piano, Hammond organ, Minimoog, Mellotron
- Geoff Downes – keyboards, Fairlight CMI, vocoder
- Trevor Horn – lead vocals, fretless bass
- Trevor Rabin – guitars, keyboards, vocals, string arrangements

== Charts ==
Chart (2013)	Peak position
UK Rock & Metal Albums (Official Charts)	37
