= Yesyears =

1991 compilation box set by Yes

Box set by Yes
- Released: 5 August 1991
- Recorded: 1969–1991
- Genre: Progressive rock
- Length: 291:23
- Label: Atco
- Producers: Yes, Paul Clay, Tony Colton, Eddy Offord, Trevor Horn, Trevor Rabin and Paul De Villiers

Yes chronology
Union (1991)	Yesyears (1991)	Yesstory (1992)

Singles from Yesyears
- 1. "Make It Easy" Released: 30 July 1991 (US)

Professional ratings
Review scores
Source	Rating
AllMusic	4.5/5 stars
The Rolling Stone Album Guide	4/5 stars

Yesyears is the first boxed set by English progressive rock band Yes, released in August 1991 on Atco Records. After the group left Atco for Arista Records when they became an eight-man formation in 1990, the deal gave Atco the right to the band's back catalogue, thus allowing them to release a career-spanning box set. Yesyears contains studio and live tracks from 1969 to 1991 with previously unreleased mixes and songs, digitally remastered by Joe Gastwirt.

One of the major attractions of Yesyears was its inclusion of rare material, including many previously unreleased songs, and a full-colour booklet detailing Yes's history. A cut-down 2-CD edition of Yesyears, titled Yesstory, was also made available, while Highlights: The Very Best of Yes, effectively a single CD version of the set, appeared in 1993. Yesyears was discontinued in the late 1990s, preceding the release of Rhino Records' In a Word: Yes (1969–), an updated 5-CD box set, in 2002. Most of the rare material found on Yesyears but not on In a Word would surface as bonus tracks on Rhino's reissues of Yes albums in 2003 and 2004.

An official home video documentary on the band's history, also titled Yesyears, was released as a companion to the box set.

== Track listing ==
Disc one
No.	Title	Writer(s)	Source	Length
1.	"Something's Coming"	Leonard Bernstein, Stephen Sondheim	Single B-side to "Sweetness", July 1969; while the Yes album reissue (2003) includes the mono mix from the UK single, this is the stereo mix, released as an A-side in the Netherlands in 1970.	7:06
2.	"Survival"	Jon Anderson	Yes (1969)	6:18
3.	"Every Little Thing"	John Lennon, Paul McCartney	Yes (1969)	5:41
4.	"Then"	Anderson	BBC recording on 19 January 1970	4:18
5.	"Everydays"	Stephen Stills	BBC recording on 4 August 1969	4:08
6.	"Sweet Dreams"	Anderson, David Foster	Time and a Word (1970)	3:49
7.	"No Opportunity Necessary, No Experience Needed"	Richie Havens	Time and a Word (1970)	4:48
8.	"Time and a Word"	Anderson, Foster	Time and a Word (1970)	4:31
9.	"Starship Trooper" a. "Life Seeker" b. "Disillusion" c. "Würm"	Anderson, Chris Squire, Steve Howe	The Yes Album (1971)	9:25
10.	"Yours Is No Disgrace"	Anderson, Squire, Howe, Tony Kaye, Bill Bruford	The Yes Album (1971)	9:41
11.	"I've Seen All Good People" a. "Your Move" b. "All Good People"	Anderson, Squire	The Yes Album (1971)	6:53
12.	"Long Distance Runaround"	Anderson	Fragile (1971)	3:31
13.	"The Fish (Schindleria Praematurus)"	Squire	Fragile (1971)	2:37
Total length:				72:45

Disc two
No.	Title	Writer(s)	Source	Length
1.	"Roundabout"	Anderson, Howe	Fragile (1971)	8:31
2.	"Heart of the Sunrise"	Anderson, Squire, Bruford	Fragile (1971)	10:35
3.	"America" (Single edit)	Paul Simon	Single A-side, July 1972; full version included on The New Age of Atlantic compilation (1972), and on Yesterdays (1975)	4:04
4.	"Close to the Edge"; I. "The Solid Time of Change"; II. "Total Mass Retain"; III. "I Get Up I Get Down"; IV. "Seasons of Man"	Anderson, Howe	Close to the Edge (1972)	18:34
5.	"Ritual (Nous Sommes du Soleil)"	Anderson, Howe, Squire, Rick Wakeman, Alan White	Tales from Topographic Oceans (1973)	21:33
6.	"Sound Chaser"	Anderson, Squire, Howe, White, Patrick Moraz	Relayer (1974)	9:22
Total length:				72:39

Disc three
No.	Title	Writer(s)	Source	Length
1.	"Soon" (Single edit)	Anderson	Single A-side, January 1975; excerpt from "The Gates of Delirium" from Relayer (1974)	4:06
2.	"Amazing Grace"	Trad. arr. Squire	Previously unreleased, recorded 4 November 1976 in London; included on the Going for the One reissue (2003)	2:31
3.	"Vevey, Part One"	Anderson, Wakeman	Previously unreleased, recorded 23 February 1977 in Vevey; Different recording/version to one found on the Going for the One reissue (2003)	1:07
4.	"Wonderous Stories"	Anderson	Going for the One (1977)	3:49
5.	"Awaken"	Anderson, Howe	Going for the One (1977)	15:35
6.	"Montreux's Theme"	Howe, Squire, Anderson, White	Previously unreleased, recorded during the Going for the One sessions late 1976/early 1977 and included on its reissue (2003)	2:26
7.	"Vevey, Part Two"	Anderson, Wakeman	Previously unreleased, recorded 23 February 1977 in Vevey; Different recording/version to one found on the Going for the One reissue (2003)	0:56
8.	"Going for the One"	Anderson	Going for the One (1977)	5:32
9.	"Money"	Squire, Anderson, White, Wakeman	Previously unreleased, recorded 31 March 1978 in London during the Tormato sessions and included on its reissue (2004); with a spoken overdub by Rick Wakeman	3:12
10.	"Abilene"	Howe	B-side of "Don't Kill the Whale" single (UK), August 1978; included on the Tormato reissue (2004)	3:55
11.	"Don't Kill the Whale"	Anderson, Squire	Tormato (1978)	3:54
12.	"On the Silent Wings of Freedom"	Anderson, Squire	Tormato (1978)	7:46
13.	"Does It Really Happen?"	Geoff Downes, Trevor Horn, Howe, Squire, White	Drama (1980)	6:30
14.	"Tempus Fugit"	Downes, Horn, Howe, Squire, White	Drama (1980)	5:14
15.	"Run with the Fox"	Squire, White, Peter Sinfield	Single A-side, December 1981, by Chris Squire and Alan White	4:09
16.	"I'm Down"	Lennon, McCartney	Previously unreleased, live at Roosevelt Stadium, Jersey City, NJ, 17 June 1976	2:31
Total length:				73:13

Disc four
No.	Title	Writer(s)	Source	Length
1.	"Make It Easy"	Trevor Rabin	Previously unreleased, recorded January 1982 by Cinema; included on the 90125 reissue (2004)	6:08
2.	"It Can Happen"	Squire, Rabin, Anderson	Previously unreleased, recorded January 1982 by Cinema; early version of 90125 song with Chris Squire on lead vocal, included on its reissue (2004)	6:01
3.	"Owner of a Lonely Heart"	Rabin, Anderson, Squire, Horn	90125 (1983)	4:27
4.	"Hold On"	Rabin, Anderson, Squire	90125 (1983)	5:15
5.	"Shoot High, Aim Low"	White, Kaye, Rabin, Squire, Anderson	Big Generator (1987)	7:00
6.	"Rhythm of Love"	Kaye, Rabin, Squire, Anderson	Big Generator (1987)	4:46
7.	"Love Will Find a Way"	Rabin	Big Generator (1987)	4:49
8.	"Changes"	Rabin, Anderson, White	Previously unreleased, live at The Summit, Houston, TX, 19 February 1988; studio version on 90125	7:34
9.	"And You and I"; I. "Cord of Life"; II. "Eclipse"; III. "The Preacher the Teacher"; IV. "Apocalypse"	Anderson, Bruford, Howe, Squire	Previously unreleased, live at The Summit, Houston, TX, 19 February 1988; studio version on Close to the Edge	10:49
10.	"Heart of the Sunrise"	Anderson, Squire, Bruford	Previously unreleased, live at The Summit, Houston, TX, 19 February 1988; studio version on Fragile	10:50
11.	"Love Conquers All"	Squire, Billy Sherwood	Previously unreleased, recorded in early 1991	4:58
Total length:				72:37

Yesyears (Atco 791 644) failed to chart in the UK or United States

== Personnel ==
=== Yes ===
- Jon Anderson – lead vocals (1.1 – 1.13, 2.1 – 2.6, 3.1, 3.4 – 3.5, 3.8 – 3.12, 3.16, 4.3 – 4.10), harp (3.3, 3.7), guitar (3.6)
- Peter Banks – guitar, backing vocals (1.1 – 1.8)
- Bill Bruford – drums (1.1 – 1.13, 2.1 – 2.4)
- Tony Kaye – keyboards (1.1 – 1.11, 4.1 – 4.11)
- Chris Squire – bass, backing vocals (all); lead vocals (3.15, 4.2)
- Steve Howe – guitar, backing vocals (1.9 – 1.13, 2.1 – 2.6, 3.1, 3.4 – 3.6, 3.8 – 3.14, 3.16)
- Rick Wakeman – keyboards (1.12 – 1.13, 2.1 – 2.5, 3.3 – 3.12)
- Alan White – drums (2.5 – 2.6, 3.1, 3.4 – 3.6, 3.8 – 3.16, 4.1 – 4.11)
- Patrick Moraz – keyboards (2.6, 3.1, 3.16)
- Geoff Downes – keyboards (3.13 – 3.14)
- Trevor Horn – lead vocals (3.13 – 3.14)
- Trevor Rabin – guitar (4.1 – 4.11), lead vocals (4.1, 4.11)

=== Additional musicians ===
- David Foster – backing vocals (1.6), acoustic guitar (1.8)
- Billy Sherwood – additional background vocals, acoustic guitar, keyboards (4.11)

== Video ==
Yesyears

Video by Yes
- Released: 1991
- Recorded: 1969–91
- Genre: Progressive rock
- Label: Atco Video

Yes chronology
9012Live (1985)	Yesyears (1991)	Greatest Video Hits (1991)

Yesyears is a 1991 video retrospective covering the band's history to that point, from their formation in 1968 through their 1991 album Union and its subsequent tour. It was released in conjunction with the box set. The video features interviews with the entire band, which, at the time of filming, featured eight members (Jon Anderson, Bill Bruford, Steve Howe, Tony Kaye, Trevor Rabin, Chris Squire, Rick Wakeman, and Alan White).

This rockumentary mixes new interviews with archive clips from live concert footage, recording session footage, television appearances and music videos, as well as a behind the scenes look at the then-ongoing 1991–1992 Union tour. The video was originally released on VHS. In the UK, both Yesyears and Greatest Video Hits were reissued on DVD on 9 February 2003, though Yesyears has never officially appeared on DVD in the US.

AllMusic called the video: "A surprisingly good and honest portrait of the band and its entire history" and said the interviews are "surprisingly candid". The Guardian wrote: "This DVD rockumentary is, on first glance, a rather ghastly affair, full of wrinkled men with mullet haircuts and transatlantic English accents. But as it lumbers along, you find yourself warming to them and their story, and perhaps even joining them in hankering after those halcyon days of the early 1970s."
