= In a Word =

In a Word: Yes (1969–)

Box set by Yes
- Released: 30 July 2002
- Recorded: 1969–2001
- Genres: Progressive rock, pop rock
- Length: 394:07
- Labels: Elektra; Rhino
- Producers: Yes; Paul Clay; Tony Colton; Eddy Offord; Trevor Horn; Trevor Rabin; Paul DeVilliers; Jonathan Elias; Billy Sherwood; Bruce Fairbairn; Tim Weidner

Yes chronology
Symphonic Live (2002)	In a Word: Yes (1969–) (2002)	The Ultimate Yes: 35th Anniversary Collection (2003)

In a Word: Yes (1969–) is the second box set by the English progressive rock band Yes, released in July 2002 by Rhino Records. The five-CD set includes tracks from the band's entire career to that point, including material by Anderson Bruford Wakeman Howe and previously unreleased tracks.

== Background ==
The set includes a 100-page booklet contains a comprehensive history of the band by journalist Chris Welch and an essay by philosopher Bill Martin. It also includes a foreword from filmmaker Cameron Crowe and testimonials from King's X frontman/bassist Doug Pinnick, Primus frontman/bassist Les Claypool, Tool drummer Danny Carey, and Phish drummer Jon Fishman.

In October 2003, figures from Nielsen SoundScan showed that 14,000 copies of the box set had been sold in the United States.

== Critical reception ==
Professional ratings
Review scores
Source	Rating
AllMusic	4.5/5 stars
Entertainment Weekly	B+
The Rolling Stone Album Guide	4/5 stars

Stephen Thomas Erlewine of AllMusic gave the box set 4.5 stars out of five, saying that "the sound is better than YesYears" and that In a Word tells the story better. Therefore, he concluded that "if all you want is one comprehensive Yes album in your collection, this suits the bill". The editorial staff of Entertainment Weekly gave In a Word a B+, noting that "the MTV hits hold up, but nostalgists will prefer dusting off the old bong and settling in with the early epics".

== Track listing ==
Disc one
No.	Title	Writer(s)	Original release	Length
1.	"Every Little Thing"	John Lennon, Paul McCartney	Yes	5:42
2.	"Sweetness"	Jon Anderson, Chris Squire, Clive Bayley	Yes	4:33
3.	"Survival"	Anderson	Yes	6:19
4.	"Then"	Anderson	Time and a Word	5:46
5.	"Sweet Dreams"	Anderson, David Foster	Time and a Word	3:50
6.	"Astral Traveller"	Anderson	Time and a Word	5:53
7.	"Time and a Word"	Anderson, Foster	Time and a Word	4:32
8.	"Dear Father"	Anderson, Squire	Single B-side / Time and a Word (German pressing)	4:21
9.	"Yours Is No Disgrace"	Anderson, Squire, Steve Howe, Tony Kaye, Bill Bruford	The Yes Album	9:41
10.	"The Clap" (Alternate Intro)	Howe	The Yes Album	3:17
11.	"Perpetual Change"	Anderson, Squire	The Yes Album	8:52
12.	"Starship Trooper: a. "Life Seeker"; b. "Disillusion"; c. "Würm"	Anderson, Squire, Howe	The Yes Album	9:28
13.	"I've Seen All Good People: a. "Your Move"; b. "All Good People"	Anderson, Squire	The Yes Album	6:55

Disc two
No.	Title	Writer(s)	Original release	Length
1.	"Roundabout"	Anderson, Howe	Fragile	8:33
2.	"South Side of the Sky"	Anderson, Squire	Fragile	7:58
3.	"Heart of the Sunrise"	Anderson, Squire, Bruford	Fragile	10:35
4.	"America"	Paul Simon	The New Age of Atlantic	10:30
5.	"Close to the Edge": I. "The Solid Time of Change"; II. "Total Mass Retain"; III. "I Get Up I Get Down"; IV. "Seasons of Man""	Anderson, Howe	Close to the Edge	18:36
6.	"The Revealing Science of God (Dance of the Dawn)"	Anderson, Squire, Howe, Rick Wakeman, Alan White	Tales From Topographic Oceans	22:22

Disc three
No.	Title	Writer(s)	Original release	Length
1.	"Siberian Khatru"	Anderson, themes by Anderson, Howe, Wakeman	Close to the Edge	8:55
2.	"Long Distance Runaround"	Anderson	Fragile	3:31
3.	"The Gates of Delirium"	Anderson, Squire, Howe, White, Patrick Moraz	Relayer	21:50
4.	"To Be Over"	Anderson, Squire, Howe, White, Moraz	Relayer	9:06
5.	"Going for the One"	Anderson	Going for the One	5:32
6.	"Turn of the Century"	Anderson, Howe, White	Going for the One	7:41
7.	"Wonderous Stories"	Anderson	Going for the One	3:49
8.	"Don't Kill the Whale"	Anderson, Squire	Tormato	3:56
9.	"Release, Release"	Anderson, White, Squire	Tormato	5:44
10.	"Arriving UFO"	Anderson, Howe, Wakeman	Tormato	6:07
11.	"Richard"	Anderson, Howe, Squire, Wakeman, White	Tormato (Hidden track on the 1st pressings UK cassette and 8-track)	3:33

Disc four
No.	Title	Writer(s)	Original release	Length
1.	"Tango" (edited version)	Anderson, Squire, Howe, Wakeman, White	Previously unreleased	3:48
2.	"Never Done Before" (edited version)	Anderson, Squire, Howe, Wakeman, White	Previously unreleased	2:10
3.	"Crossfire" (edited version)	Howe, Squire	Previously unreleased	2:42
4.	"Machine Messiah"	Geoff Downes, Trevor Horn, Howe, Squire, White	Drama	10:27
5.	"Tempus Fugit"	Downes, Horn, Howe, Squire, White	Drama	5:15
6.	"Owner of a Lonely Heart"	Trevor Rabin, Anderson, Squire, Horn	90125	4:29
7.	"It Can Happen"	Squire, Anderson, Rabin	90125	5:29
8.	"Leave It"	Squire, Rabin, Horn	90125	4:14
9.	"Hold On"	Rabin, Anderson, Squire	90125	5:16
10.	"Rhythm of Love"	Anderson, Kaye, Rabin, Squire	Big Generator	4:47
11.	"Love Will Find a Way"	Rabin	Big Generator	4:50
12.	"Holy Lamb (Song for Harmonic Convergence)"	Anderson	Big Generator	3:19
13.	"Brother of Mine" (Anderson Bruford Wakeman Howe): a. "The Big Dream"; b. "Nothing Can Come Between Us"; c. "Long Lost Brother of Mine""	Anderson, Wakeman, Howe, Bruford, Downes	Anderson Bruford Wakeman Howe	10:18
14.	"Fist of Fire (Anderson Bruford Wakeman Howe)" (Alternate Version)	Anderson, Wakeman, Howe, Bruford	Anderson Bruford Wakeman Howe	3:27
15.	"I Would Have Waited Forever" (Full Uncut Version)	Anderson, Jonathan Elias, Howe	Union	7:02

Disc five
No.	Title	Writer(s)	Original release	Length
1.	"Lift Me Up"	Rabin, Squire	Union	6:30
2.	"The Calling"	Anderson, Squire, Rabin	Talk	6:55
3.	"I Am Waiting"	Anderson, Rabin	Talk	7:24
4.	"Mind Drive"	Anderson, Squire, White, Howe, Wakeman	Keys to Ascension 2	18:37
5.	"Open Your Eyes"	Anderson, Squire, White, Howe, Billy Sherwood	Open Your Eyes	5:14
6.	"Universal Garden"	Anderson, Squire, White, Howe, Sherwood	Open Your Eyes	6:17
7.	"Homeworld (The Ladder)"	Anderson, Squire, White, Howe, Sherwood, Igor Khoroshev	The Ladder	9:32
8.	"The Messenger"	Anderson, Squire, White, Howe, Sherwood, Khoroshev	The Ladder	5:13
9.	"Last Train"	Anderson, Squire, Howe, White	Previously unreleased	2:23
10.	"In the Presence Of": I. "Deeper"; II. "Death of Ego"; III. "True Beginner"; IV. "Turn Around and Remember""	Anderson, Squire, Howe, White	Magnification	10:24

== Personnel ==
- Jon Anderson – lead vocals (all except 4.4 – 4.5)
- Peter Banks – guitar, backing vocals (1.1 – 1.8)
- Bill Bruford – drums (1.1 – 2.5, 3.1 – 3.2, 4.13 – 4.15)
- Tony Kaye – keyboards (1.1 – 1.13, 4.6 – 4.12, 5.1 – 5.3)
- Chris Squire – bass, backing vocals (all except 4.13 – 4.14)
- Steve Howe – guitar, backing vocals (1.9 – 4.5, 4.13 – 4.15, 5.4 – 5.10)
- Rick Wakeman – keyboards (2.1 – 3.2, 3.5 – 4.3, 4.13 – 4.15, 5.4)
- Alan White – drums (2.6, 3.3 – 4.12, 5.1 – 5.10)
- Patrick Moraz – keyboards (3.3 – 3.4)
- Geoff Downes – keyboards (4.4 – 4.5)
- Trevor Horn – lead vocals (4.4 – 4.5)
- Trevor Rabin – guitar, backing vocals (4.6 – 4.12, 5.1 – 5.3)
- Billy Sherwood – guitar, keyboards, backing vocals (5.5 – 5.8)
- Igor Khoroshev – keyboards (5.7 – 5.8)
