= Yesstory =

Compilation album by Yes
- Released: 30 September 1991
- Recorded: 1969–1987
- Genre: Progressive rock
- Length: 137:52
- Label: Atco
- Producers: Yes, Paul Clay, Tony Colton, Eddy Offord, Trevor Horn, Trevor Rabin and Paul De Villiers

Yes chronology
Yesyears (1991)	Yesstory (1991)	Highlights: The Very Best of Yes (1993)

Singles from Yesstory
- 1. "Owner of a Lonely Heart" Released: 18 November 1991

Professional ratings
Review scores
Source	Rating
Allmusic	4.5/5 stars

Yesstory is a double CD and triple LP career-spanning distillation of music by progressive rock band Yes that had originally appeared on the 1991 box set Yesyears. Yesstory was issued in September 1991 lacking the rarity material that had characterized its parent release, although it does contain "Make It Easy", previously only released on Yesyears.

The album's cover art was painted by Roger Dean.

== UK CD track listing ==
Disc One
No.	Title	Writer(s)	Length
1.	"Survival"	Jon Anderson	6:18
2.	"No Opportunity Necessary, No Experience Needed"	Richie Havens	4:48
3.	"Time and a Word"	Anderson, David Foster	4:31
4.	"Starship Trooper" a. "Life Seeker" (Anderson) b. "Disillusion" (Chris Squire) c. "Würm" (Steve Howe)	Anderson, Chris Squire, Steve Howe	9:26
5.	"I've Seen All Good People" a. "Your Move" (Anderson) b. "All Good People" (Squire)	Anderson, Squire	6:53
6.	"Roundabout"	Anderson, Howe	8:31
7.	"Heart of the Sunrise"	Anderson, Squire, Bruford	10:31
8.	"Close to the Edge" a. "The Solid Time of Change" b. "Total Mass Retain" c. "I Get Up I Get Down" d. "Seasons of Man"	Anderon, Howe	18:34

Disc Two
No.	Title	Writer(s)	Length
1.	"Ritual (Nous Sommes du Soleil)" (Music by Anderson, Squire, Howe, Rick Wakeman, Alan White)	Anderson, Howe	21:33
2.	"Soon (Single edit)"	Anderson	4:06
3.	"Wonderous Stories"	Anderson	3:45
4.	"Going for the One"	Anderson	5:32
5.	"Don't Kill the Whale"	Anderson, Squire	3:55
6.	"Does It Really Happen?"	Howe, Squire, White, Downes, Horn	6:34
7.	"Make It Easy"	Trevor Rabin	6:08
8.	"Owner of a Lonely Heart"	Rabin, Anderson, Squire, Horn	4:27
9.	"Rhythm of Love"	Anderson, Kaye, Rabin, Squire	4:46
10.	"Changes (Live at The Summit, Houston, TX, 19 February 1988)"	Rabin, Anderson, White	7:34

== US CD track listing ==
Disc One
No.	Title	Writer(s)	Length
1.	"Something’s Coming (stereo mix)"	Leonard Bernstein, Stephen Sondheim	7:06
2.	"Survival"	Jon Anderson	6:18
3.	"Every Little Thing"	John Lennon, Paul McCartney	5:41
4.	"No Opportunity Necessary, No Experience Needed"	Richie Havens, Jerome Moross	4:48
5.	"Time and a Word"	Anderson, David Foster	4:31
6.	"Starship Trooper" a. "Life Seeker" (Anderson) b. "Disillusion" (Chris Squire) c. "Würm" (Steve Howe)	Anderson, Chris Squire, Steve Howe	9:26
7.	"Yours is No Disgrace"	Anderson, Squire, Howe, Tony Kaye, Bill Bruford	9:40
8.	"I've Seen All Good People" a. "Your Move" (Anderson) b. "All Good People" (Squire)	Anderson, Squire	6:53
9.	"Roundabout"	Anderson, Howe	8:31
10.	"Heart of the Sunrise"	Anderson, Squire, Bruford	10:31

Disc Two
No.	Title	Writer(s)	Length
1.	"Long Distance Runaround"	Anderson, Squire, Howe, Rick Wakeman, Bruford	3:33
2.	"America (single edit)"	Paul Simon	4:03
3.	"Close to the Edge" a. "The Solid Time of Change" b. "Total Mass Retain" c. "I Get Up I Get Down" d. "Seasons of Man"	Anderon, Howe	18:34
4.	"Ritual - Nous Sommes du Soleil" (Music by Anderson, Squire, Howe, Wakeman, Alan White)	Anderson, Howe	21:33
5.	"Soon (single edit)"	Anderson	4:06
6.	"Wonderous Stories"	Anderson	3:45
7.	"Going for the One"	Anderson	5:32
8.	"Don't Kill the Whale"	Anderson, Squire	3:55
9.	"Owner of a Lonely Heart"	Trevor Rabin, Anderson, Squire, Trevor Horn	4:27
10.	"Rhythm of Love"	Anderson, Kaye, Rabin, Squire	4:46
