= The Ultimate Yes: 35th Anniversary Collection =

Box set by Yes
- Released: 28 July 2003 (UK); 27 January 2004 (US)
- Recorded: 1969–2003
- Genre: Progressive rock
- Length: 2:38:01 (UK); 2:59:07 (US)
- Labels: Warner Music (UK); Rhino (US)
- Producers: Yes; Paul Clay; Tony Colton; Eddy Offord; Trevor Horn; Trevor Rabin; Paul De Villiers; Jonathan Elias; Bruce Fairbairn; Tim Weidner

Yes chronology
In a Word: Yes (1969–) (2002)	The Ultimate Yes: 35th Anniversary Collection (2003)	Yes Remixes (2003)

Professional ratings
Review scores
Source	Rating
AllMusic	3.5/5 stars
The Rolling Stone Album Guide	3/5 stars

The Ultimate Yes: 35th Anniversary Collection is a compilation album by the English progressive rock band Yes. It was originally released on 2 CDs on 28 July 2003 by Warner Music in the United Kingdom. A 3 CD edition with additional material, including an acoustic EP with new recordings from October 2003, was released in the US on 27 January 2004 by Rhino Records.

The album was a commercial success in the UK, reaching No. 10 on the UK Albums Chart to become their highest performance on the chart since Union in 1991, selling more than 19,000 copies in its first week of release and 80,000 at the end of 2003. It was certified gold by the British Phonographic Industry for selling 100,000 copies. In the US, it peaked at No. 131 on the Billboard 200. The Ultimate Yes was supported with a one-off acoustic performance recorded on Yes Acoustic: Guaranteed No Hiss (2004) and their 35th Anniversary Tour, covering Europe and North America through 2004.

== U.S. track listing ==
Disc 1
No.	Title	Original release	Length
1.	"Time and a Word" (Jon Anderson/David Foster)	Time and a Word (1970)	4:33
2.	"Starship Trooper: a. "Life Seeker" (Anderson) b. "Disillusion" (Chris Squire) c. "Würm" (Steve Howe)"	The Yes Album (1971)	9:29
3.	"Yours Is No Disgrace" (Anderson/Squire/Howe/Tony Kaye/Bill Bruford)	The Yes Album	9:41
4.	"I've Seen All Good People: a. "Your Move" (Anderson) b. "All Good People" (Squire)"	The Yes Album	6:56
5.	"Roundabout" (Anderson/Howe)	Fragile (1971)	8:32
6.	"Long Distance Runaround" (Anderson)	Fragile	3:31
7.	"Heart of the Sunrise" (Anderson/Squire/Bruford)	Fragile	10:37
8.	"South Side of the Sky" (Anderson/Squire)	Fragile	7:56
9.	"And You and I" (Anderson; Themes by Bruford/Howe/Squire): I. "Cord of Life" II. "Eclipse" (Anderson/Bruford/Howe) III. "The Preacher the Teacher" IV. "Apocalypse"	Close to the Edge (1972)	10:09
10.	"America (Single edit)" (Paul Simon)	Non-album single	4:10
11.	"Wonderous Stories" (Anderson)	Going for the One (1977)	3:49

Disc 2
No.	Title	Original release	Length
1.	"Siberian Khatru" (Anderson; Themes by Anderson/Howe/Rick Wakeman)	Close to the Edge	8:56
2.	"Soon (New edit)" (Anderson/Squire/Howe/Alan White/Patrick Moraz)	Relayer (1974)	5:44
3.	"Going for the One" (Anderson)	Going for the One	5:32
4.	"Don't Kill the Whale" (Anderson/Squire)	Tormato (1978)	3:57
5.	"Tempus Fugit" (Geoff Downes/Trevor Horn/Howe/Squire/White)	Drama (1980)	5:16
6.	"Owner of a Lonely Heart" (Trevor Rabin/Anderson/Squire/Horn)	90125 (1983)	4:28
7.	"Leave It" (Squire/Rabin/Horn)	90125	4:19
8.	"It Can Happen (Single edit)" (Squire/Anderson/Rabin)	90125	4:18
9.	"Rhythm of Love" (Anderson/Kaye/Rabin/Squire)	Big Generator (1977)	4:52
10.	"Big Generator (Remix)" (Anderson/Kaye/Rabin/Squire/White)	Big Generator	3:39
11.	"Lift Me Up" (Rabin/Squire)	Union (1991)	6:31
12.	"The Calling (Single edit)" (Anderson/Rabin/Squire)	Talk (1994)	4:39
13.	"Open Your Eyes" (Anderson/Squire/Howe/White/Billy Sherwood)	Open Your Eyes (1997)	5:15
14.	"Homeworld (The Ladder) (Radio edit)" (Anderson/Squire/Howe/White/Sherwood/Igor Khoroshev)	The Ladder (1999)	4:39
15.	"Magnification" (Anderson/Squire/Howe/White)	Magnification (2001)	7:19

Disc 3
No.	Title	Length
1.	"Roundabout (Acoustic)" (Anderson/Howe)	4:18
2.	"Show Me" (Anderson)	3:37
3.	"South Side of the Sky (Acoustic): I. "South Side of the Sky" (Anderson/Squire) II. "South Side Variations" (Wakeman)"	4:28
4.	"Australia (Solo Acoustic)" (Howe)	4:12
5.	"New World Symphony" (Squire, based on Antonin Dvořák's Symphony No. 9 in E minor)	3:33

== UK track listing ==
Disc 1
No.	Title	Original release	Length
1.	"Yours Is No Disgrace"	The Yes Album	9:41
2.	"Survival"	Yes	6:20
3.	"Roundabout"	Fragile	8:32
4.	"Then" (Anderson)	Time and a Word	5:47
5.	"I've Seen All Good People: a. "Your Move" b. "All Good People"	The Yes Album	6:56
6.	"Heart of the Sunrise"	Fragile	10:37
7.	"Starship Trooper: a. "Life Seeker" b. "Disillusion" c. "Würm"	The Yes Album	9:29
8.	"Ritual (Nous Sommes du Soleil)" (Anderson/Howe/Squire/Wakeman/White)	Tales From Topographic Oceans	21:32

Disc 2
No.	Title	Original release	Length
1.	"Siberian Khatru"	Close to the Edge	8:56
2.	"Long Distance Runaround"	Fragile	3:31
3.	"Wonderous Stories"	Going for the One	3:49
4.	"And You and I (Alternate version) (Anderson; Themes by Bruford/Howe/Squire): I. "Cord of Life" II. "Eclipse" (Anderson/Bruford/Howe) III. "The Preacher the Teacher" IV. "Apocalypse""	Previously unreleased	10:15
5.	"Soon (Single edit)"	Relayer	5:44
6.	"Going for the One"	Going for the One	5:32
7.	"Don't Kill the Whale"	Tormato	3:57
8.	"Owner of a Lonely Heart"	90125	4:28
9.	"Leave It"	90125	4:19
10.	"Big Generator (Remix)"	Big Generator	3:39
11.	"The Calling (Single edit)"	Talk	4:39
12.	"Homeworld (The Ladder) (Radio edit)"	The Ladder	4:39
13.	"Awaken" (Anderson/Howe)	Going for the One	15:31

== Personnel ==
This list is in chronological order by who first joined the band (or when they joined the band for the first time).

- Jon Anderson – Lead vocals (1969–1980, 1983–2004)
- Chris Squire – Bass guitar, Backing vocals (1969–1981, 1983–2004)
- Peter Banks – Lead guitars (1969–1970)
- Bill Bruford – Drums, Percussion (1969–1972, 1990–1992)
- Tony Kaye – Keyboards (1969–1971, 1983–1994)
- Steve Howe – Lead guitars, Backing vocals (1971–1981, 1990–1992, 1995–2004)
- Rick Wakeman – Keyboards (1971–1974, 1977–1980, 1990–1992, 1995–1996, 2002–2004)
- Alan White – Drums, Percussion (1973–1981, 1983–2004)
- Patrick Moraz – Keyboards (1974–1976)
- Trevor Horn – Lead vocals (1980–1981)
- Geoff Downes – Keyboards (1980–1981)
- Trevor Rabin – Lead guitars, Backing/Lead vocals, Keyboards (1983–1994)
- Billy Sherwood – Rhythm guitars, Keyboards, Backing vocals (1997–2000)
- Igor Khoroshev – Keyboards (1997–2001) (except on track 13 of Disc 2, U.S. Release)

=== Additional personnel ===
- Steve Porcaro – keyboards on track 13 of Disc 2, U.S. Release

=== Personnel on Disc 3, U.S. Release ===
- Jon Anderson – lead vocals, acoustic rhythm guitar (tracks 1–3)
- Chris Squire – acoustic bass guitar (tracks 1–3), electric bass (track 5), backing vocals (tracks 1–3)
- Steve Howe – lead acoustic guitar, backing vocals (tracks 1–4)
- Rick Wakeman – piano (tracks 1–3)
- Alan White – drums, percussion (tracks 1–3)

== New recordings ==
The later US release included a third disc of new recordings. These included three semi-acoustic band recordings, similar to what the band had been playing live: two versions of old Yes songs ("Roundabout" and "South Side of the Sky") and one new song by Anderson ("Show Me"). Also included was a Howe solo recording, a new version of his solo piece from the 1970s, "Australia", recorded with the help of Oliver Wakeman, Rick's son, who would later join Yes. Finally, "New World Symphony" was a solo recording by Squire, an adaptation of Dvorak's Symphony No. 9 in E min.

The lyrics to "Show Me" are about the Gulf War.

== Charts ==
Chart performance for The Ultimate Yes: 35th Anniversary Collection
Chart (2003)	Peak position
Australian Albums (ARIA)	82
Scottish Albums (Official Charts)	13
UK Albums (Official Charts)	10
UK Rock & Metal Albums (Official Charts)	3
US Billboard 200	131

== Certifications ==
Region	Certification	Certified units/sales
United Kingdom (BPI)	Gold	100,000^{^}
^{^} Shipments figures based on certification alone.
