= 9012Live (video) =

1985 live video album by Yes

- Front cover of 2006 DVD release

Video by Yes
- Released: 7 November 1985 (US); 27 March 1986 (UK)
- Studio: Atlantic Video/Warner Music UK Ltd.
- Length: 67 minutes
- Language: English
- Label: Image Entertainment (DVD)
- Director: Steven Soderbergh
- Producer: Yes; Tony Dimitriades

Yes chronology
Yessongs (1975)	9012Live (1985)	Yesyears (1991)

9012Live is a 1985 concert film featuring the English rock band Yes, recorded at the Northlands Coliseum in Edmonton, Alberta, Canada on 28 and 29 September 1984 on the band's tour in support of their eleventh studio album, 90125 (1983). The film features a line-up of singer Jon Anderson, guitarist Trevor Rabin, keyboardist Tony Kaye, bassist Chris Squire, and drummer Alan White. In addition to the concert performance, the film includes special effects by Charlex and a colourised version of the short film Young Man's Fancy (1952), produced by Edison Electric.

9012Live was released on VHS and aired on MTV in November 1985 as a companion release to the live album 9012Live: The Solos. It was released on DVD in 2006 with bonus footage and a director's cut without the effects and stock footage. The film was directed by future Academy Award-winner Steven Soderbergh; he and the group were nominated for a Grammy Award for Best Music Video, Long Form for the release. The film's ending features the quote "The rhythm of big generators", which inspired the name of Yes' next album, Big Generator (1987).

== Personnel ==
- Jon Anderson: lead and backing vocals, guitar, keyboards
- Trevor Rabin: guitar, lead and backing vocals
- Chris Squire: bass, backing vocals
- Tony Kaye: keyboards, backing vocals on "Leave It"
- Alan White: drums, backing vocals on "Leave It"

== Track listing ==
1. "Cinema"
2. "Leave It"
3. "Hold On"
4. "I've Seen All Good People"
  1. "Your Move"
  2. "All Good People"
5. "Changes"
6. "Make It Easy (Intro)" – "Owner of a Lonely Heart"
7. "It Can Happen"
8. "City of Love"
9. "Starship Trooper"
  1. "Life Seeker"
  2. "Disillusion"
  3. "Wurm"
10. "Roundabout" (DVD exclusive)

== Bonus features on DVD ==
- Special director's cut - This features only live footage of the band, omitting the Charlex effects. It includes all the songs from the main portion of the DVD, in the same order.
- "Roundabout" - a performance of "Roundabout" that was omitted from the original release
- Access All Areas documentary
- Band interviews

== Certifications ==
Region	Certification	Certified units/sales
Canada (Music Canada)	Platinum	10,000^{^}
^{^} Shipments figures based on certification alone.
