= The Word Is Live =

Box set by Yes
- Released: 23 August 2005
- Recorded: 12 March 1970–19 February 1988
- Genre: Progressive rock
- Length: 3:49:40
- Label: Rhino
- Producer: Steve Woolard

Yes chronology
Songs from Tsongas (2005)	The Word Is Live (2005)	Essentially Yes (2006)

Professional ratings
Review scores
Source	Rating
AllMusic	2.5/5 stars

The Word Is Live is a box set by the English progressive rock band Yes, released in August 2005 by Rhino Records. A triple album, the set is compiled of live recordings from radio broadcasts and concert tours between 1970 and 1988, mostly from guitarist Steve Howe's tape collection.

== Background ==
Many of the tracks were originally broadcast on radio shows and have been bootlegged extensively. In these, it is often the case that the radio show's final mix was the only mix available so few improvements in quality could be done for the release. While a few of the recordings (mostly those from the 1980 tour) do feature a less-than-polished quality to them, The Word Is Live is still considered a fine document of Yes in a concert setting.

The box set also comes with a 52-page book containing images and stories by Yes fans and praising retroperspectives from artists such as John Frusciante of Red Hot Chili Peppers and Geddy Lee of Rush. The opening for the book was written by Greg Lake of Emerson, Lake & Palmer.

The set includes several pieces not originally released as studio recordings by Yes, including "It's Love", an extended cover of a song by The Young Rascals, and "Go Through This" and "We Can Fly from Here" from the tour to support Drama, but which were not released on that album. The latter would eventually be reworked and released thirty-one years later in the album Fly from Here.

The title is a pun on the lyric, "(and) the word is love", from their song "Time and a Word".

== Track listing ==
Disc one
No.	Title	Writer(s)	Recording date and location	Length
1.	"Then"	Jon Anderson	12 March 1970, BBC Studios, London on John Peel's Sunday Show	5:25
2.	"For Everyone"	Anderson, Chris Squire	12 March 1970	4:44
3.	"Astral Traveller"	Anderson	24 January 1971, Konserthuset, Gothenburg	7:24
4.	"Everydays"	Stephen Stills	24 January 1971	11:01
5.	"Yours Is No Disgrace"	Anderson, Squire, Steve Howe, Tony Kaye, Bill Bruford	31 July 1971, Crystal Palace, London	11:45
6.	"I've Seen All Good People" a. "Your Move" b. "All Good People"	Anderson, Squire	31 July 1971	7:52
7.	"America"	Paul Simon	31 July 1971	16:21
8.	"It's Love"	Felix Cavaliere, Eddie Brigati	31 July 1971	11:07

Disc two
No.	Title	Writer(s)	Recording date and location	Length
1.	"Apocalypse"	Anderson, Squire, Howe, Bruford	17 August 1976, Cobo Arena, Detroit	3:08
2.	"Siberian Khatru"	Anderson, Howe, Rick Wakeman	17 August 1976	10:10
3.	"Sound Chaser"	Anderson, Squire, Howe, Patrick Moraz, Alan White	17 August 1976	11:17
4.	"Sweet Dreams"	Anderson, David Foster	10 May 1975, Loftus Road Stadium, London	6:22
5.	"Future Times/Rejoice"	Anderson, Squire, Howe, Wakeman, White	8 October 1978, Oakland-Alameda County Coliseum Arena, Oakland	6:59
6.	"Circus of Heaven"	Anderson	8 October 1978	4:52
7.	"The Big Medley" "Time and a Word" "Long Distance Runaround" "The Fish" / "Survival" "Perpetual Change" "Soon"	Anderson, Foster, Squire	5 October 1978, The Forum, Inglewood	25:53
8.	"Hello Chicago"	Anderson, Squire, Howe, Wakeman, White	10 June 1979, International Amphitheatre, Chicago	2:11
9.	"Roundabout"	Anderson, Howe	10 June 1979	8:42

Disc three
No.	Title	Writer(s)	Recording date and location	Length
1.	"Heart of the Sunrise"	Anderson, Squire, Bruford	8 October 1978	10:56
2.	"Awaken"	Anderson, Howe	10 June 1979	17:53
3.	"Go Through This"	Steve Howe	6 September 1980, Madison Square Gardens, New York City	4:21
4.	"We Can Fly from Here"	Geoff Downes, Trevor Horn	6 September 1980	6:46
5.	"Tempus Fugit"	Downes, Horn, Howe, Squire, White	6 September 1980	5:53
6.	"Rhythm of Love"	Anderson, Squire, Trevor Rabin, Kaye	19 February 1988, The Summit, Houston	6:42
7.	"Hold On"	Anderson, Squire, Rabin	19 February 1988	7:24
8.	"Shoot High, Aim Low"	Anderson, Squire, Rabin, Kaye, White	19 February 1988	8:27
9.	"Make It Easy" / "Owner of a Lonely Heart"	Anderson, Squire, Rabin, Horn	19 February 1988	6:09

== Personnel ==
- Jon Anderson – lead vocals (1.1 – 3.2, 3.6 – 3.9)
- Peter Banks – guitar, backing vocals (1.1 – 1.2)
- Bill Bruford – drums (1.1 – 1.8)
- Tony Kaye – keyboards (1.1 – 1.8, 3.6 – 3.9)
- Chris Squire – bass, backing vocals (all)
- Steve Howe – guitar, backing vocals (1.3 – 3.5)
- Rick Wakeman – keyboards (2.5 – 3.2)
- Alan White – drums (2.1 – 3.9)
- Patrick Moraz – keyboards (2.1 – 2.4)
- Geoff Downes – keyboards (3.3 – 3.5)
- Trevor Horn – lead vocals (3.3 – 3.5)
- Trevor Rabin – guitar, backing vocals (3.6 – 3.9)
