= Greatest Video Hits (Yes video) =

Video by Yes
- Released: 5 August 1991
- Recorded: 1977–91
- Genre: Progressive rock
- Label: Atco Video; Rhino Entertainment

Yes chronology
Yesyears (1991)	Greatest Video Hits (1991)	Yes: Live - 1975 at Q.P.R. (1993)

Greatest Video Hits is a 1991 compilation of promotional videos from progressive rock group Yes. It contains the majority of MTV videos filmed by the band, as well as a few early promotional videos that pre-date MTV. It contains videos from 1977's Going for the One through 1987's Big Generator.

In between videos, band members are interviewed backstage in the Pensacola Civic Center before a concert on the 1991 Union tour. These were from the same interview sessions that were used in the Yesyears video. The video was released on VHS in 1991. In the UK, both Greatest Video Hits and Yesyears were reissued on DVD on 9 February 2003. In the US, Greatest Video Hits was reissued on DVD on 12 July 2005.

== Track listing ==
1. "Wonderous Stories"
2. "Don't Kill the Whale"
3. "Madrigal"
4. "Tempus Fugit"
5. "Into the Lens"
6. "Hold On" (live)
7. "Leave It"
8. "It Can Happen"
9. "Owner of a Lonely Heart"
10. "Rhythm of Love"
11. "Love Will Find a Way"
12. "I've Seen All Good People" (live)
