= 9012Live: The Solos =

1985 live album by Yes

Live album by Yes
- Released: 7 November 1985
- Recorded: 24 June 1984; 28 September 1984
- Venues: Westfalenhalle (Dortmund, West Germany); Northlands Coliseum (Edmonton, Alberta, Canada)
- Genres: Pop rock; progressive rock
- Length: 34:24
- Label: Atco
- Producer: Yes

Yes chronology
90125 (1983)	9012Live: The Solos (1985)	Big Generator (1987)

Professional ratings
Review scores
Source	Rating
AllMusic	1.5/5 stars
The Rolling Stone Album Guide	1/5 stars

9012Live: The Solos is the third live album by English rock band Yes, released as a mini-LP in the US on 7 November 1985 and in the UK on 17 March 1986 by Atco Records. Recorded during their 1984 world tour in support of their eleventh studio album, 90125 (1983), the album features a selection of solo tracks performed by each of the five band members, plus live versions of two songs from 90125. The album was a companion release to the band's 1985 concert film, 9012Live. In 2009, the album was reissued in Japan by Isao Kikuchi for Warner Music Japan, with two bonus tracks.

== Track listing ==
Note: "Si", "Solly's Beard", and "Soon" were recorded on 24 June 1984 at Westfalenhalle in Dortmund, Germany. All other tracks were recorded on 28 September 1984 at Northlands Coliseum in Edmonton, Alberta. "Hold On", "Changes", and "City of Love" are part of the soundtrack to the movie 9012Live. "It Can Happen" was originally the B-side of the "It Can Happen" single (co-produced with long-time Yes engineer Eddie Offord). No date or recording location is given. The single was released in the United States, Canada, and New Zealand in 1983, making a 1983 recording date likely.

Side one
No.	Title	Writer(s)	Length
1.	"Hold On"	Trevor Rabin, Chris Squire, Jon Anderson	6:57
2.	"Si"	Tony Kaye	2:40
3.	"Solly's Beard"	Trevor Rabin	4:39
4.	"Soon"	Anderson	2:18
Total length:			16:34

Side two
No.	Title	Writer(s)	Length
1.	"Changes"	Rabin, Anderson, Alan White	7:00
2.	"Amazing Grace"	Traditional, arr. Squire	2:10
3.	"Whitefish"	Squire, White	8:40
Total length:			17:50

2009 reissue bonus tracks
No.	Title	Writer(s)	Length
8.	"City of Love"	Rabin, Anderson	6:31
9.	"It Can Happen"	Squire, Anderson, Rabin	6:29
Total length:			47:24

"Hold On" and "Changes" are live versions of tracks from 90125, while "Soon" is a new arrangement of the final ballad segment from 1974's "The Gates of Delirium". The instrumental "Whitefish" was written by Chris "Fish" Squire and Alan White (hence the track title) and is based on a medley of elements from three previous Yes tracks written by Squire and/or White: Squire’s 1971 bass showcase "The Fish", the bassline from 1980's "Tempus Fugit" and a portion of 1974's "Sound Chaser". Both "Si" and "Solly's Beard" were original pieces new to this release: the first a Tony Kaye synthesizer and organ piece (at one point quoting Bach's "Toccata & Fugue in D minor") and the latter a fast-picked Trevor Rabin acoustic guitar solo, named after his dog and written/performed in the vein of 1970s jazz fusion guitarists such as Al di Meola and John McLaughlin. Versions of "Soon", "Solly's Beard" and "Whitefish" would be variously performed on subsequent Yes tours in the 1990s and 2000s.

== Release ==
The album reached No. 44 in on the UK Albums Chart and No. 81 on the US Billboard 200 during a chart stay of eleven weeks.

== Personnel ==
=== Yes ===
- Jon Anderson – lead vocals, keyboards, acoustic guitar
- Trevor Rabin – guitars, vocals
- Chris Squire – bass guitar, vocals
- Tony Kaye – keyboards, vocals
- Alan White – drums, vocals

=== Production ===
- Yes – production
- Alan Santos – production manager
- Paul Massey – engineer
- Paul de Villiers – engineer, sounds
- Merle McLain – lighting director
- Lookout Management – management
- Rex King – tour management
- Bill Ludwig – mastering

== Charts ==
Chart (1985–86)	Peak position
Canada Top Albums/CDs (RPM)	88
UK Albums (Official Charts)	44
US Billboard 200	81
