= Love Will Find a Way (Yes song) =

Single by Yes

from the album Big Generator
- B-side: "Holy Lamb"
- Released: 14 September 1987
- Genre: Pop rock
- Length: 4:50
- Label: Atco
- Songwriter(s): Trevor Rabin
- Producer(s): Yes; Trevor Horn; Trevor Rabin; Paul DeVilliers

Yes singles chronology
"It Can Happen" (1984)	"Love Will Find a Way" (1987)	"Rhythm of Love" (1987)

"Love Will Find a Way" is a song by the progressive rock band Yes, from their 1987 album Big Generator. It was released as the first single from that album, reaching number 30 on the Billboard Hot 100 chart in late 1987. It also topped the U.S. Mainstream Rock chart, holding onto the number one spot for three weeks.

== History ==
Yes guitarist and singer Trevor Rabin originally wrote the song for singer Stevie Nicks to perform; however, Yes drummer Alan White encouraged Rabin to let Yes record the song instead.

"Love Will Find a Way" was the fifth of six Yes singles to crack the U.S. top 40; it has been featured on several of Yes' later compilations, including the box sets Yesyears and In a Word: Yes (1969–). A video for the song is also included on Yes' Greatest Video Hits.

== Personnel ==
Yes

- Trevor Rabin – lead vocals, guitars, keyboards, string arrangements, backing vocals
- Jon Anderson – backing vocals, post-chorus lead vocals
- Tony Kaye – Hammond organ, piano
- Chris Squire – bass guitar, backing vocals
- Alan White – drums, percussion, backing vocals

Additional musicians

- Jimmy Zavala – harmonica
- Kim Bullard – programming

== Live performances ==
The song was played at every concert during the 1987-88 tour supporting Big Generator. During the first half of the tour it was played as the first encore, and during the second half of the tour it was played early in the set list after "Shoot High Aim Low" was dropped. After this tour the song would not be played again live, although on the summer 1994 tour for Talk its riff was occasionally used as an intro to "Roundabout".

== Alternative versions ==
In 2003, Trevor Rabin released a pair of albums, each of which featured a different version of "Love Will Find a Way": Live in LA features a 1989 live performance of the song, and 90124 features an early demo of the song in which Rabin sings all the vocals and plays all of the instruments.

== Charts ==
Chart (1987)	Peak position
UK Singles (OCC)	73
US Billboard Hot 100	30
US Mainstream Rock (Billboard)	1

== Official remixes ==
UK 12" ATCO Records – A 9449(T)

- 1) "Love Will Find a Way" (Extended Version)
- 2) "Love Will Find a Way" (The Rise and Fall Mix)
- 3) "Holy Lamb (Song for Harmonic Convergence)"

Track 1 remixed by Freddy Bastone. Track 2 remixed by Chris (Jelly Fish) Squire.
