= America (Simon & Garfunkel song) =

1968 song written and composed by Paul Simon

Song by Simon & Garfunkel

from the album Bookends
- Released: April 3, 1968
- Recorded: February 1, 1968
- Studio: Columbia Studio A (New York City)
- Genre: Folk rock
- Length: 3:34
- Label: Columbia
- Songwriter: Paul Simon
- Producers: Paul Simon; Art Garfunkel; Roy Halee

"America"

Single by Simon & Garfunkel

from the album Simon and Garfunkel's Greatest Hits
- B-side: "For Emily, Whenever I May Find Her" (live)
- Released: November 1972
- Genre: Folk rock
- Length: 3:23
- Label: CBS
- Songwriter: Paul Simon

Simon & Garfunkel singles chronology
| "For Emily, Whenever I May Find Her (live)" (1972) | "America" (1972) | "My Little Town" (1975) |

"America" is a song performed by American music duo Simon & Garfunkel, which they included on their fourth studio album, Bookends, in 1968. It was produced by the duo and Roy Halee. The song was later issued as the B-side of the single "For Emily, Whenever I May Find Her (live version)" in 1972 to promote the release of the compilation album Simon and Garfunkel's Greatest Hits. After peaking in the charts in July 1972, the song was switched to the A-side of the single and re-entered the charts in November 1972.

The song was written and composed by Paul Simon, and concerns young lovers hitchhiking their way across the United States, in search of "America", in both a literal and figurative sense. It was inspired by a 1964 road trip that Simon took with his then-girlfriend Kathy Chitty. The song has been regarded as one of Simon's strongest songwriting efforts and one of the duo's best songs. A 2014 Rolling Stone reader's poll ranked it the group's fourth-best song.

== Background ==
"America"
"America" follows two lovers as they travel the country, looking for America.

"America" was inspired by a five-day road excursion Simon undertook in September 1964 with Chitty. Producer Tom Wilson had called Simon, living in London at the time, back to the United States to finalize mixes and artwork for their debut studio album, Wednesday Morning, 3 A.M. Simon, reluctant to leave Chitty, invited her to come with him; they spent five days driving the country together. Several years later, "America" was among the last songs recorded for Bookends, when production assistant John Simon left Columbia Records, forcing Simon, Garfunkel, and producer Roy Halee to complete the record themselves. In 2004, Bob Dyer, a former disc jockey from Saginaw, Michigan, explained the song's genesis in an interview with The Saginaw News. According to Dyer, Simon wrote the song while visiting the town in 1966 after Dyer had booked him for Y-A-Go-Go, a concert series hosted by the Saginaw YMCA.

I asked Paul Simon if they were still charging the $1,250 we paid them to play and he said they were getting about four times that much then. Then I asked him why he hadn't pulled out, and he said he had to see what a city named Saginaw looked like. Apparently, he liked it; he wrote "America" while he was here, including that line about taking four days to hitchhike from Saginaw.

== Composition ==
"America" is a song that "creates a cinematic vista that tells of the singer's search for a literal and metaphorical America that seems to have disappeared, along with the country's beauty and ideals." Art Garfunkel once described the song as "young lovers with their adventure and optimism". The song has been described as a "folk song with a lilting soprano saxophone in its refrain as a small pipe organ paints acoustic guitars, framed by the ghostly traces of classic American Songbook pop structures." "America" is composed in the key of D major and set in a 6/8 time signature, and has a moderately fast groove of 172 beats per minute. The duo's vocals span from the low note of A_{2} to the high note of E_{4}. Drummer Hal Blaine, keyboardist Larry Knechtel, and bassist Joe Osborn provide additional instrumentation on the track, while there is also an uncredited soprano saxophone part. The lyrics are written in blank verse.

The song opens, on Bookends, with a crossfade from "Save the Life of My Child". (This effect is not present on the single versions, which begin with a "clean" open.) The song follows two young lovers – "an apparently impromptu romantic traveling alliance" – who set out "to look for America". The lyrics mention Saginaw, Michigan, with the narrator seemingly having left the town to seek "his fortunes elsewhere". The narrator's companion, Kathy, is a reference to Chitty, linking the song autobiographically to the earlier Simon and Garfunkel hit "Homeward Bound", and to "Kathy's Song", a love song from a previous album, Sounds of Silence.

The narrator spends four days hitchhiking from Saginaw to join Kathy in Pittsburgh, where together they board a Greyhound bus to continue the journey. For the trip, they purchase cigarettes and Mrs. Wagner's Pies. The narrator begins with a lighthearted and optimistic outlook ("Let us be lovers, we'll marry our fortunes together") that fades over the course of the song. To pass time, he and Kathy play games and try to guess the backgrounds of their fellow passengers. Over the course of their journey, they smoke all their cigarettes. Kathy reads a magazine before falling asleep, leaving the narrator awake to reflect on the meaning of the journey alone. In the final verse, the narrator is able to speak his true emotions to Kathy, now that she is sleeping and cannot hear or answer. "I'm empty and aching and I don't know why" captures the longing and angst of the 1960s in nine simple words.

The narrator then stares out the window "counting the cars on the New Jersey Turnpike". Many other empty, aching, and lost souls are on the highway, each on their own journey alone even if someone is traveling with them. The soaring harmony lines and crashing cymbals create a powerful and poignant end to the song's final verse: "They've all come to look for America." Pete Fornatale interprets this lyric as a "metaphor to remind us all of the lost souls wandering the highways and byways of mid-sixties America, struggling to navigate the rapids of despair and hope, optimism and disillusionment."

== Reception ==
Stephen Holden, in reviewing Simon & Garfunkel's Greatest Hits in 1972, wrote, "'America' ... was Simon's next major step forward. It is three and a half minutes of sheer brilliance, whose unforced narrative, alternating precise detail with sweeping observation evokes the panorama of restless, paved America and simultaneously illuminates a drama of shared loneliness on a bus trip with cosmic implications." Record World called the single version from Greatest Hits "a more commercial, elaborate production than appeared on the Bookends album." Thom Jurek of Allmusic described the song's central question as an "ellipsis, a cipher, an unanswerable question", a song in which "sophisticated harmonic invention is toppled by its message". David Nichols, in 1001 Albums You Must Hear Before You Die, called the song "a splendid vignette of a road trip by young lovers; both intimate and epic in scale, it traces an inner journey from naive optimism to more mature understanding." American Songwriter deemed the song "essentially a road-trip song, but like all road trips, it tends to reveal as much about the participants as it does about the lands being traversed."

Disc jockey and author Pete Fornatale describes "America" as one of Paul Simon's "greatest writing achievements in this phase of his career". In 2014, a Rolling Stone readers poll ranked it fourth among the duo's best compositions, with the magazine writing, "it captured America's sense of restlessness and confusion during the year that saw the assassinations of Martin Luther King Jr. and Robert F. Kennedy, as well as the escalation of the war in Vietnam", declaring it one of their most "beloved" songs.

== Legacy ==
The song enjoyed a resurgence in popularity – and was introduced to a new generation – after being featured in Cameron Crowe's critically acclaimed film Almost Famous in 2000. An early scene in the film, set in 1968, finds the free-spirited character "Anita" (Zooey Deschanel) playing the song for her mother (Frances McDormand) to "... explain why [she] is leaving home to become a stewardess". The financial services company American Express also used the song in a series of popular television advertisements in the late 2010s.

In 2010, lyrics from the song began appearing spray-painted on vacant buildings and abandoned factories in the town of Saginaw, Michigan, which is mentioned in the song. The group of artists, Paint Saginaw, decided to paint the phrases after the population had dwindled vastly, noting that the song became rather "homesick" for the town's residents. The song's entire lyrics are painted on 28 buildings in the city, including railroad tracks and bridge supports.

The song was featured in "America", a television advertisement for the presidential campaign of Bernie Sanders during the 2016 Democratic Party presidential primaries. The campaign sought permission to use it from Paul Simon and Art Garfunkel themselves, who both agreed. Garfunkel stated that he was a supporter of Sanders and his campaign, and that the usage of "America" did not take away from the song's original premise.

The song appears in a 2017 TV commercial for the Volkswagen Atlas. It is also referenced in the novel The Great Believers by Rebecca Makkai.

In June 2026, CBS News included the song in its list of the 250 essential American songs of the past 250 years.

== Cover versions ==
=== 1-2-3/Clouds ===
The earliest known performances of "America" came from the band Clouds. In their earlier incarnation as 1-2-3, they had performed a re-written version of the song that included elements similar to those later used by Yes; changes in time signature, classical interludes, newly written segments, etc. A live tape exists of this being performed at the Marquee in April 1967, prior to the release of any known recording by any artist, including Paul Simon, himself. Simon had recorded demos at Levy studios in London in 1965, and tapes of these were passed to the band by a studio engineer (Stu Francis of Radio Luxembourg). In 1966, 1-2-3 also performed "Sounds of Silence" from this same tape.

=== Yes ===
"America"
- German single release

Single by Yes

from the album The New Age of Atlantic
- B-side: "Total Mass Retain"
- Released: 17 July 1972 (US)
- Genre: Progressive rock
- Length: 10:30 (album version); 4:12 (single version)
- Label: Atlantic
- Songwriter: Paul Simon
- Producers: Yes; Eddie Offord

Yes singles chronology
| "Roundabout" (1972) | "America" (1972) | "And You and I" (1972) |

The song was rearranged by the progressive rock band Yes in 1970, performing it in concert on the first tour after Steve Howe replaced Peter Banks. Yes added elements typical to progressive rock, such as changes in time signature and long instrumental segments, while dropping the song's original repeat and fade ending. At one point bassist Chris Squire quotes "America" from West Side Story in the intro. The Yes studio version clocks in at ten and a half minutes, with live versions on the 1970–1971 tour extended to more than fifteen minutes. The studio recording first appeared in 1972 on the sampler album The New Age of Atlantic and was later included on the compilation album Yesterdays in 1975, the box set In a Word: Yes (1969–) in 2002, and on the 2003 re-issue of their album Fragile.

An edited version of this recording lasting 4 minutes was released as a single and hit No. 46 on the U.S. Billboard Hot 100. It also reached No. 20 in New Zealand. It also appeared on the Yesyears boxed set and its condensed version Yesstory, along with The Ultimate Yes: 35th Anniversary Collection. The edited version was also included as a bonus track on the 2003 re-issue of Close to the Edge, while the unedited studio version appears on Steven Wilson's 2013 remix of the same album. A live version of the song was included on 1996's Keys to Ascension as well as a performance from the final show of the 1970–1971 tour (which preceded the studio recording) on 2005's The Word Is Live.

Record World called the single "An ironic choice of material, but an excellent one."

Howe considers Yes's version to be "a kind of lost recording" among the band's work, since it has rarely been included on their compilations, and when it is, it is usually a shortened version. When he had the chance to meet Simon in person at a disaster-relief concert in 1992, Howe asked him if he liked Yes's version, and Simon said he did.

Personnel

- Jon Anderson – lead vocals
- Steve Howe – guitars, backing vocals
- Chris Squire – bass guitar, backing vocals
- Bill Bruford – drums, percussion
- Rick Wakeman – organ, synthesizer, mellotron, electric piano

==== Charts ====
| Chart (1972) | Peak position |
|---|---|
| Canada Top Singles (RPM) | 43 |
| New Zealand (Listener) | 20 |
| US Billboard Hot 100 | 46 |

=== Bert Sommer version ===
Folk singer Bert Sommer, a member of the group the Left Banke, covered the song in the late 1960s, and he also performed the song at Woodstock in 1969.

=== David Bowie performance ===
David Bowie performed a minimalist version of the song to open The Concert for New York City in October 2001. Bowie performed seated on the floor, center stage, with a microphone and a Suzuki Omnichord.

=== Other versions ===
American singer-songwriter Josh Groban recorded it on his live album Live at the Greek (2003), and has performed the song live on multiple occasions, including a Howard Gilman Opera House for Brooklyn Academy of Music's celebration of Simon's music in 2008, and at the A Capitol Fourth concert in 2011. "Paul Simon is one of my favorite artists and 'America' has always been a song I've loved," he once remarked.

Lucy Wainwright Roche performs it, together with The Roches, on her 2010 album Lucy.

The band America also released a recording of the song on their 2011 album Back Pages.

The Swedish sister duo First Aid Kit performed the song in honor of Paul Simon at the 2012 Polar Music Prize award ceremony, which earned them a standing ovation from Paul Simon himself. On Black Friday of 2014, First Aid Kit released a 10" single containing the song as the title track. They performed a live version on the Marc Riley show for BBC Radio 6 Music on September 4, 2012.

Renaissance recorded a version of it in 1981, wherein Annie Haslam sings as the male narrator without any lyrical adjustments. It remained unreleased until appearing on the 1997 compilation Songs from Renaissance Days.

Sting performed the song on a quarter size acoustic guitar live on stage on the Paul Simon with Sting tour.

U2 has snippeted the song on multiple occasions during their 2015 and 2017 world tours.

== Chart performance ==
=== Weekly charts ===
| Chart (1972) | Peak position |
|---|---|
| UK Singles (Official Charts) | 25 |
| US Billboard Hot 100 | 97 |

== Certifications ==
| Region | Certification | Certified units/sales |
|---|---|---|
| New Zealand (RMNZ) | Gold | 15,000^{‡} |
| United Kingdom (BPI) | Silver | 200,000^{‡} |
^{‡} Sales+streaming figures based on certification alone.

== Personnel ==
Simon & Garfunkel

- Paul Simon – lead vocals, acoustic guitars, producer
- Art Garfunkel – harmony vocals, producer

Additional musicians

- Hal Blaine – drums
- Larry Knechtel – Hammond organ
- Joe Osborn – bass
- Uncredited – soprano saxophone

Production

- Roy Halee – producer, recording engineer
- Bob Johnston – production assistant

== Notes ==
=== Sources ===
- Bennighof, James (2007). The Words and Music of Paul Simon. Greenwood Publishing Group. ISBN 978-0-275-99163-0.
- Eliot, Marc (2010). Paul Simon: A Life. John Wiley and Sons. ISBN 978-0-470-43363-8.
- Fornatale, Pete (2007). Simon and Garfunkel's Bookends. Rodale. ISBN 978-1-59486-427-8.
