= The Gates of Delirium =

1974 song by Yes

- UK album A-side label

Song by Yes

from the album Relayer
- Released: 29 November 1974
- Recorded: 1974
- Genre: Progressive rock; jazz fusion
- Length: 21:50
- Label: Atlantic
- Songwriter: Yes
- Producers: Yes; Eddie Offord

"The Gates of Delirium" is a song by the English progressive rock band Yes, recorded for their seventh studio album, Relayer. At almost 22 minutes in length, the song is loosely based on the 1869 novel War and Peace by Leo Tolstoy which originated from a musical idea that frontman Jon Anderson had that depicted a battle. It was then developed and arranged into a complete track by Anderson and the rest of the band, namely bassist Chris Squire, guitarist Steve Howe, drummer Alan White, and keyboardist Patrick Moraz. Musically, the song represents an introductory vocal section followed by an instrumental that represents the battle. The final section, entitled "Soon", is a gentle, soothing prayer for peace and hope.

The song was originally released in November 1974 as side one of Relayer. A shortened version of "Soon" was released as a single in the United States and various other territories in January 1975, but did not chart. Yes performed "The Gates of Delirium" live between 1974 and 1976; it was not played live again until 2000. The piece was performed live with an orchestra on stage with the band in 2001, and it was reinstated into the band's live set in 2019.

== Recording ==
A loud crashing sound heard in the middle of the song is caused by a set of old automobile parts mounted on a rack being pushed over. The band decided to keep it in instead of doing another take. Alan White explains in the liner notes of the 2003 remaster of the album.

"The percussion on that song is pretty unusual," he says. "Jon and I used to travel together to Chris' home studio, where we recorded the album. We would stop at a junkyard along the way and pick up parts of cars. We'd just go there and bang on things. There were springs and pieces of metal, brake, and clutch plates. We'd buy them and bring them back to the studio. We built a rack and hung all these things off it, and we'd bang on them. During the recording I pushed the whole thing over. That crash is what you hear on the album."

== Live ==
The song "The Gates of Delirium" was performed in its entirety during the lengthy set of tours between the releases of Relayer and Going for the One. It was revived for the 2000 Masterworks tour based on a fan survey in which it came out as the top choice for songs fans wanted to hear Yes play live. Yes continued to play the song in the 2001 Magnification tour.

Otherwise, only the "Soon" fragment was performed.

- A 22min 40sec live version of the track recorded on 17 August 1976, at Cobo Hall, Detroit, appears on the live album Yesshows.
- It was found in the "Big Medley" of the Tormato tour. A version of this can be found on The Word is Live.
- It was performed on the 9012Live tour, A version from this tour appears on the live album 9012Live: The Solos.
- The song was not regularly played live again until the Open Your Eyes tour. However, it did appear on 4 April 1988, in Tokyo, Japan, and 28 and 29 October 1989, in Wembley, UK, on the Big Generator tour, and on 9 April 1991, in Pensacola, Florida, on the Union tour.
- The song was performed on Yes's 35th Anniversary tour; before this (but after the Open Your Eyes tour), the song only appeared on 6 September 1999, on The Ladder tour.
- The song was performed in its entirety on the DVD Symphonic Live recorded in 2001, featuring an orchestra conducted by Wilhelm Keitel and Tom Brislin as guest on keyboards.
- The song was performed on the Royal Affair Tour, and was recorded for release on The Royal Affair Tour: Live from Las Vegas.
- The song is due to be played in its entirety in 2023 on The Album Series Tour (which will also contain the remainder of Relayer).

== Single ==
"Soon"

Single by Yes

from the album Relayer
- B-side: "Sound Chaser (Single edit)"
- Released: 8 January 1975 (US)
- Recorded: 1974
- Genre: Progressive rock
- Length: 4:18
- Label: Atlantic
- Songwriter: Yes (Note: "Soon" is credited solely to Jon Anderson per BMI records. However, the track is credited to Yes as a whole on both the original single and the 2003 remaster of the album.)
- Producers: Yes; Eddie Offord

Yes singles chronology
"And You and I" (1972)	"Soon" (1975)	"Wonderous Stories" (1977)

Entitled "Soon", the last part of the song "The Gates of Delirium" was issued as Atlantic single #3242 in January 1975. Its B-side was typically a single edit of "Sound Chaser" (3:13), though copies exist of the release with both "Sound Chaser" – probably in the same single edit – and "Roundabout" or a mono version of the song (without "Sound Chaser" in any form) as the B-side. Cash Box described it as "the distinctive sound of Yes is here presented in an eerie, mysterious setting with vocalist Jon Anderson floating amidst the spacey sounds of the rest of the band."

A very different edit of "Soon," 5:44 in length, was released on The Ultimate Yes: 35th Anniversary Collection.

== Remaster ==
The 2003 remastered version of the Relayer album included a studio run-through of this song in its entirety. It is somewhat shorter than the original version, with a run time of 21:16 compared to the 21:56 running time on this reissue. However, no date is given for this recording.

== See also ==
- List of anti-war songs
