= Hold On (Yes song) =

1983 song by Yes

Song by Yes

from the album 90125
- Released: 7 November 1983
- Recorded: 1983
- Genre: Rock; pop
- Length: 5:16
- Label: Atco
- Songwriters: Trevor Rabin; Jon Anderson; Chris Squire
- Producers: Trevor Horn; Yes

"Hold On"

Promotional single by Yes

from the album 9012Live: The Solos
- Released: November 1985
- Recorded: 1984
- Venue: Northlands Coliseum (Edmonton, Canada)
- Length: 5:10
- Label: Atco
- Songwriters: Trevor Rabin; Jon Anderson; Chris Squire
- Producer: Yes

"Hold On" is a song by the progressive rock band Yes, from their 1983 album, 90125. It reached number 43 on the U.S. Mainstream Rock chart in 1984. Later, the live version from 9012Live: The Solos reached number 27 in 1985.

== History ==
The core of "Hold On" was written by Yes guitarist Trevor Rabin, prior to his joining the band, as two separate songs: "Hold On" and "Moving In". Once Rabin joined the band, the two songs were combined, with band members Chris Squire and Jon Anderson contributing additional music and lyrics. All three are credited as writers.

Unlike the other songs on 90125, which are credited as "Produced by Trevor Horn" exclusively, Yes shares a production credit with Horn for "Hold On".

"Hold On" has also appeared on several of Yes' later compilations, including the Yesyears and In a Word: Yes (1969–) box sets.

== Alternative versions ==
Yes' 1985 follow-up album, 9012Live: The Solos, features a live version of "Hold On". A live version is also included on 2005's The Word Is Live, and a live performance of "Hold On" is included on the 1991 Greatest Video Hits DVD.

Demos of Rabin's early versions of "Hold On" and "Moving In" were released in 2003 on Rabin's solo album 90124.

== Charts ==
=== Album Version ===
Chart (1983)	Peak position
US Mainstream Rock (Billboard)	43

=== Live Version ===
Chart (1985)	Peak position
US Mainstream Rock (Billboard)	27
