= It Can Happen =

Single by Yes

from the album 90125
- B-side: "It Can Happen" (live)
- Released: 4 June 1984 (US); 2 July 1984 (UK)
- Recorded: 1983
- Genre: Pop rock; progressive rock; raga rock
- Length: 5:29 (album version); 4:18 (single edit)
- Label: Atco Records
- Songwriter(s): Jon Anderson; Trevor Rabin; Chris Squire
- Producer(s): Trevor Horn

Yes singles chronology
"Leave It" (1984)	"It Can Happen" (1984)	"Love Will Find a Way" (1987)

"It Can Happen" is a song by the progressive rock band Yes, from their 1983 album 90125. It was released as the third single from that album, reaching number 51 on the Billboard Hot 100 chart in 1984. It also reached number 5 on the Billboard Mainstream Rock chart.

== History ==
Following the 1981 breakup of the band, bassist Chris Squire and drummer Alan White joined with South African guitarist Trevor Rabin to form a new band called Cinema. An early version of the song "It Can Happen", sung by Squire, was written and recorded during this time.

Squire, White and Rabin eventually joined forces with former Yes members Jon Anderson, Tony Kaye and Trevor Horn, changing the name of their new band Cinema to "Yes" in the process. Anderson rewrote the lyrics of "It Can Happen" and it was included in 90125, with Anderson singing the verses.

Cash Box said that "starting off with a thoroughly danceable snare beat, lead vocalist Jon Anderson's smooth voice and the single’s upbeat melody are further proof of the band’s newfound knack for commercial viability" and praised the production and instrumental performances.

The Cinema version of the song was released on 1991's Yesyears box set, and later on the remastered version of 90125. The version sung by Anderson was released as a single in 1984, and was included in several later Yes compilations, including the In a Word: Yes (1969–) box set and The Ultimate Yes: 35th Anniversary Collection.

A video for the song is included in the Greatest Video Hits DVD, and a live performance appears in the 9012Live concert video.

The dialogue that can be heard under the guitar solo - about 3 minutes and 17 seconds in - on the 90125 version, is taken from The Importance of Being Earnest by Oscar Wilde. The lines, "...Come, old boy, you had much better have the thing out at once...." and "...that is exactly what dentists always do. Now, go on! Tell me the whole thing" are spoken by the character Algernon Moncrieff in the play.

== Charts ==
Chart (1984)	Peak position
US Billboard Hot 100	51
US Mainstream Rock (Billboard)	5
