= Make It Easy =

Single by Yes

from the album Yesyears
- B-side: "Long Distance Runaround"
- Released: 31 July 1991 (US)
- Recorded: January 1983
- Studio: Sunpark (London)
- Genre: Rock
- Length: 6:06
- Label: Atco - Atco 74-98738
- Songwriter: Trevor Rabin
- Producer: Yes

Yes singles chronology
| "Saving My Heart" (1991) | "Make It Easy" (1991) | "The Calling" (1994) |

"Make It Easy" is a 1991 song by the progressive rock band Yes. An early version of this song from 1981 was written and sung by Trevor Rabin, originally as a demo titled "Don't Give In". It was later re-worked by Yes which included Chris Squire, Alan White and Tony Kaye after Jon Anderson made his departure from the band.

The song was unreleased until 1991, when it was included on the Yes boxed set Yesyears and released as a cassette single backed with "Long Distance Runaround". The single debuted on the Billboard's Hot Mainstream Rock Tracks chart in August 1991, eventually peaking at number 36. It was later included as a bonus track on the remastered version of 90125.

== Background ==
The 1980 incarnation of Yes included Trevor Horn, Geoff Downes, Steve Howe, Chris Squire and Alan White. When this group split up following the tour for the album Drama, Squire and White joined forces with South African singer and guitarist Trevor Rabin. The three were eventually joined by former Yes keyboardist Tony Kaye, and the four began writing and recording demos under the band name "Cinema".

Demos produced from the Cinema sessions included "Make It Easy" and "It's Over", with both having lead vocals by Rabin, and an early version of "It Can Happen" featuring Squire on vocals. The Cinema version of "It Can Happen" and "Make It Easy" appeared as previously unreleased recordings on 1991's Yesyears boxed set compilation.

"Make It Easy" was released as a single in 1991 by Atco Records. Billboard wrote that the single "bears unmistakable instrumentation and dramatic harmonies" and was "a classic rock fan's dream". The song debuted on the Billboard Album Rock Tracks on August 24, 1991, eventually peaking at number 36.

Both "Make It Easy" and the demo version of "It Can Happen" as well as "It's Over" were later included as bonus tracks on the remastered version of 90125 released in 2004 by Rhino Records.

== Personnel ==
Produced and performed by Yes:

- Tony Kaye
- Trevor Rabin
- Chris Squire
- Alan White

Engineering:

- Nigel Luby
- Trevor Rabin

== Charts ==
| Chart (1991) | Peak position |
|---|---|
| US Mainstream Rock (Billboard) | 36 |
