= Heart of the Sunrise =

Song by Yes

from the album Fragile
- Released: 12 November 1971
- Recorded: August–September 1971
- Genre: Progressive rock
- Length: 10:37 (original version); 11:27 (Fragile version)
- Label: Atlantic
- Songwriters: Jon Anderson; Chris Squire; Bill Bruford; Rick Wakeman (uncredited)
- Producers: Yes; Eddy Offord

"Heart of the Sunrise" is a progressive rock song by British band Yes. It is the closing track on their fourth album, 1971's Fragile. The compositional credits go to Jon Anderson, Chris Squire, and Bill Bruford, though keyboardist Rick Wakeman contributed some uncredited sections.

The song eventually rose to become the band's fifth most-played song, and appears on Yessongs, Classic Yes, In a Word: Yes (1969–), and many other studio and live retrospectives. The song was featured in the 1998 comedy-drama film Buffalo '66.

== Meaning ==
According to Anderson, the song is about living in and feeling lost in a large bustling city . This was explained on the Fragile (1971) tour . In the Big Generator (1987) tour, Anderson said that the song is about the power and energy of the sunrise. In 1978, however, he had said that the song was about the power of love. He occasionally made other comments regarding its meaning. For example, in the 16 October 1971 show, Anderson stated that the organ in the song is inaudible and that the song will be performed without it. He further noted that the organ is "one of the best jokes in the business."

== Content and structure ==
The song begins with a long introduction, with over three and half minutes of instrumental playing before the vocals begin. It incorporates multiple time signatures. It starts with a churning, bass-heavy riff in 6/8 time, which is a musical palindrome. After one full sequence, it merges into a new, slightly funky section in 4/4 that lasts for a minute and a half. It afterwards breaks back into three full cycles of the main riff. Bassist Chris Squire wrote this main riff which was inspired by the King Crimson track "21st Century Schizoid Man".

At around 3:40, after the final cycle, the vocals begin and the song switches to a much softer style. This section starts in 6/8 but includes many individual sequences, including a quirky 5/8 riff that appears in various speeds and arrangements. The song gradually builds in intensity, eventually including the main riff interspersed with the other sections. A brief 9/8 classical snippet of Rick Wakeman's is used as well in both classical and rock arrangements. Bands like Weather Report were trying out far reaching jazz-rock influenced music at the time which is what convinced the band they needed to try something new. The interesting composition originated when Jon Anderson was inspired by the composer Igor Stravinsky to jump into different structural composition.

The song itself ends very abruptly around 10:35, but a reprise of "We Have Heaven" from earlier on the album is included as a hidden track, extending it to 11:27 (11:32 on the 2003 release). Some vinyl pressings of the album, as well as most pre-recorded tape editions, end without this reprise. At either length, it is the longest song on the album. Original North American pressings of Fragile contain the reprise, but list "Heart of the Sunrise"'s timing as 10:34, not reflecting its inclusion.

Rick Wakeman contributed to the writing of "Heart of the Sunrise" (and fellow album piece "South Side of the Sky") by adding piano interludes to both songs, but was not credited because of contractual conflicts. He was instead promised more money by Atlantic studio executives, which he claims he never saw.

== Reception ==
Ultimate Classic Rock critic Ryan Reed described the song as being Yes' 3rd heaviest song saying that it "[utilizes] a chromatic, King Crimson-inspired bass riff and gothic blasts of mellotron" and that "there's light here, too, but the dark is midnight-black."

Yes drummer Bill Bruford claimed that "the band hit its real template" with the song, commenting on its "drama" and "poise". Anderson and Squire have both referred to it as one of their favorite Yes songs.

== Live versions ==
A number of live versions were released:

- Yessongs (Close to the Edge Tour)
- Progeny: Seven Shows from Seventy-Two (Close to the Edge Tour)
- Yes – Symphonic Live, 2002, (Heineken Music Hall, Amsterdam)
- The Word is Live (Tormato Tour)
- Yesyears (Big Generator Tour)
- An Evening of Yes Music Plus (Performed by Anderson Bruford Wakeman Howe, on their tour)
- Live at Montreux 2003 (Full Circle Tour)
- Union Live (Union Tour)
- In the Present – Live from Lyon (In the Present Tour)
- Like It Is: Yes at the Mesa Arts Center (Heaven & Earth Tour)
- Topographic Drama - Live Across America (Albums Tour 2016-2017)

When performed live, the song was mostly performed the same as the studio version, accounting for obvious differences in instrumentation. Of course, the introductions changed as well. In the early part of the Big Generator tour, the main riff was worked into an instrumental version of "Almost Like Love", which led off the show. Trevor Rabin later said he wished that "Almost Like Love" was not included on the album.

Progressive metal band Dream Theater paid tribute to Yes with a live cover of this song, which is included on their Uncovered 2003-2005 official bootleg.

Lizzo's band performed the opening riff as an introduction to "Boys" while touring in support of Special.

== Personnel ==
- Jon Anderson – lead vocals
- Steve Howe – electric guitars, backing vocals
- Chris Squire – bass guitar, backing vocals
- Rick Wakeman – Hammond organ, Mellotron, Minimoog, grand piano
- Bill Bruford – drums, percussion
