= Starship Trooper =

Song by Yes

from the album The Yes Album
- Released: 19 February 1971
- Recorded: October 1970
- Studio: Advision, London
- Genre: Progressive rock
- Length: 9:29; 3:16 (Life Seeker); 2:21 (Disillusion); 3:51 (Würm)
- Label: Atlantic
- Songwriters: Jon Anderson; Steve Howe; Chris Squire
- Producers: Yes; Eddy Offord

"Starship Trooper" is a song written by British musicians Jon Anderson, Steve Howe and Chris Squire, which first appeared on Yes' 1971 album The Yes Album. The song is in three parts, "Life Seeker", "Disillusion" and "Würm". "Life Seeker" was released as a single on the B-side of the UK release of "Your Move".

== Lyrics and music ==
Anderson was aware of the title of Starship Troopers, the 1959 novel by Robert A. Heinlein, and from that got the idea of a "Starship Trooper" who was "another guardian angel and Mother Earth". "Starship Trooper" was constructed from pieces of music written separately by Anderson, Howe and Squire. Anderson was the primary author of "Life Seeker". Squire wrote most of the "Disillusion" section; this section had earlier been used with slightly different lyrics as the bridge for the song "For Everyone", with Squire providing the lead vocals. Howe had written the instrumental "Würm" section while he was in an earlier band (Bodast).

The song was heavily constructed in the recording studio, and the band were never able to play it live in quite the way it was recorded. The song changes mood, rhythm, tempo and style continually, but according to Yes biographer Chris Welch, it still manages to "hang together". Authors Pete Prown and Lisa Sharken describe the "Würm" section as "a Bolero-paced chord sequence that builds into an explosive solo". They note that Howe's guitar solo incorporates rockabilly and country music elements rather than the blues-based music with distortion that is typical for these types of solos.

A theme of "Life Seeker" is the search for God. Anderson has stated that the lyrics:

Mother life, hold firmly on to me
Spread my knowledge higher than the day
Release as much as only you can show

refer to "the point within yourself that knows you," which we call "God." The lyrics accept the fact that "no matter how much you want to get clearer visions of what you're up to, you're only going to get a certain amount."

The song uses UFO imagery. Other themes that have been inferred for the song include New Age ideas and environmentalism.

== Critical reception ==
British journalist Chris Welch described "Starship Trooper" as "one [of] the most astonishing pieces" in Yes' repertoire. He particularly praised the "Würm" section for its "grinding intensity." The New Rolling Stone Album Guide critic Ernesto Lechner described the song as being "ethereal." Pitchfork Media considered "Howe's slow, spacey guitar build at the end" of the song to be "one of the great Yes moments." Paul Stump, in his History of Progressive Rock, elaborated that this guitar solo "smothered the repetitive three-chord patterns of the finale in gloriously unorthodox fashion, employing multinational voicings in a non-blues solo pattern. This was no burglarizing of different constituents from different genres but a methodical honing-down of those constituents into quite a separate style of music which defied any pigeon-holing." Pop Matters critic Sean Murphy rated "Starship Trooper" as the 36th best progressive rock song of all time, calling it "perhaps the definitive showcase for Howe, allowing him to illustrate his utter mastery of the instrument (both acoustic and electric)."

== Other appearances ==
"Starship Trooper" has appeared on many of Yes' live albums and DVDs, including Yessongs, Live in Philadelphia, 9012Live, Keys to Ascension, Symphonic Live, Songs from Tsongas, Like It Is: Yes at the Bristol Hippodrome, Topographic Drama - Live Across America, Yes 50 Live, and The Royal Affair Tour: Live from Las Vegas.

Jazz pianist Brad Mehldau recorded two sections of "Starship Trooper", "Life Seeker" and "Würm" on his 2022 album Jacob's Ladder.

== Personnel ==
Band

- Jon Anderson – lead vocals
- Chris Squire – bass guitar, backing vocals
- Steve Howe – electric and acoustic guitars
- Tony Kaye – Hammond organ, Moog synthesizer
- Bill Bruford – drums, percussion
