= Rhythm of Love (Yes song) =

1987 song by Yes

Single by Yes

from the album Big Generator
- B-side: "City of Love" (live)
- Released: 7 December 1987
- Recorded: 1985–1987
- Genre: Pop rock
- Length: 4:47
- Label: Atco
- Songwriters: Jon Anderson; Tony Kaye; Trevor Rabin; Chris Squire
- Producers: Yes; Trevor Horn; Trevor Rabin; Paul De Villiers

Yes singles chronology
"Love Will Find a Way" (1987)	"Rhythm of Love" (1987)	"Lift Me Up" (1991)

"Rhythm of Love" is a song by Yes that appeared on their 1987 Big Generator album. The song was sung by Jon Anderson, with writing credits being assigned to all members of the band. It was released repeatedly as a single, alternating as the A-side or B-side of "Love Will Find a Way". "Rhythm of Love" was the band's last top 40 single on the US Billboard Hot 100, where it peaked at No. 40.

== Background ==
Trevor Rabin was responsible for writing much of "Rhythm of Love", who created the song with the desire of producing a hit that matched the commercial success Yes's previous album, 90125. He reworked the verses several times and encountered particular difficulties in arriving at a suitable melody for Anderson to sing. According to Rabin, "the first couple of melodies sounded OK when I sang it, but Jon’s a far superior singer and they didn't suit his voice." Once Rabin arrived at a melody that Anderson was pleased with, further attention was placed on it with the intention of making it the first single from Big Generator. Ultimately, "Love Will Find a Way" was selected for that role instead, with "Rhythm of Love" becoming the album's next single.

== Release ==
Cash Box thought that Jon Anderson's vocals were "in top form and bravely guide this tune along a smooth and rockin' path." They also anticipated that the single would "instantly attract tremendous radio attention". Billboard described the single as "spaciously arranged" and "propelled by an agile rhythm."

A music video of the song, directed by Alex Proyas, was also created. It features individual shots of the band members playing, along with stop-motion animated robotic figures like a fish, a bird, and a robot that becomes enamored with a human woman seen throughout.

"Rhythm of Love" has been remixed many times, though, thus far, only two have seen a legal issue on CD; both appeared on the 1987 CD single, and have not seen an official release elsewhere. Paulinho Da Costa was brought in for percussion overdubs. The song eventually became one of the band's most popular songs and appeared on a number of tours since 1987, eventually becoming the 18th most played song at Yes concerts, appearing 384 times as of 2009.

== Live performances ==
The song was played on the Big Generator, Union, Talk, Open Your Eyes, 35th Anniversary and Royal Affair concert tours.

Throughout the 1987-1988 Big Generator tour, Yes experimented with its introduction, playing it different ways: Early in November 1987, they started the show with the "Almost Like Love" intro, segueing into the "Heart of the Sunrise" riff, before transitioning into "Rhythm of Love". Other times, they started the song the same way they did on the record, with the flute sample.

Few live versions have been officially issued. One can be found on the box set The Word Is Live.

"Rhythm of Love" was also performed by Yes Featuring Jon Anderson, Trevor Rabin, Rick Wakeman on both of their tours. It was also released on the band's Live at the Apollo album in 2018. In a statement coinciding with the release of the "Rhythm of Love" live video, which was culled from Live at the Apollo, Rabin called it "a real favorite of ours live."

== Charts ==
=== Weekly charts ===
Chart (1987)	Peak position
Italy Airplay (Music & Media)	9
US Billboard Hot 100	40
US Mainstream Rock (Billboard)	2

== Official remixes ==
12" ATCO Records – 0-96722

- 1) "Rhythm Of Love" (Dance To The Rhythm Mix)
- 2) "Rhythm Of Love" (Move To The Rhythm Mix)
- 3) "Rhythm Of Love" (The Rhythm Of Dub)
- 4) "City Of Love" (Live Edit)

Promo CD ATCO Records – PR 2089-2

- 1) "Rhythm Of Love" (Edit)
- 2) "Rhythm Of Love" (Move To The Rhythm Mix)
- 3) "Rhythm Of Love" (Dance To The Rhythm Mix)
