= Yours Is No Disgrace =

- Italian single cover, with part 1 on the A-side and part 2 on the B-side

Single by Yes

from the album The Yes Album
- B-side: "The Clap"
- Released: June 1971
- Studio: Advision, London
- Genre: Progressive rock
- Length: 9:41 (album version)
- Label: Atlantic
- Songwriters: Jon Anderson; Steve Howe; Chris Squire; Bill Bruford; Tony Kaye
- Producers: Yes; Eddie Offord

Official audio
- "Yours Is No Disgrace" (2008 Remaster) on YouTube

"Yours Is No Disgrace" is a song by English progressive rock band Yes, which first appeared as the opening song of their 1971 album The Yes Album. It was written by all five members of the band: Jon Anderson, Chris Squire, Steve Howe, Tony Kaye and Bill Bruford. The song has been a regular feature of Yes' live shows. It has also appeared on many live and compilation albums, including Yessongs, Classic Yes and Yesstory.

The opening track of The Yes Album, "Yours Is No Disgrace" lasts for nearly ten minutes. According to AllMusic critic Dave Thompson, the length and complexity of "Yours Is No Disgrace" was a tester for Yes' longer songs over their next few albums, most notably "And You and I", although he says "at the time of release, however, it was unique – and, listened to in isolation today, it remains so."

Yes appeared on the weekly BBC show Top of the Pops to perform the song on 1 April 1971, although only as promotion of the forthcoming album, as there was no UK single release. The song was released as a single, however, in Italy and in the Netherlands.

== Lyrics ==
According to Howe, Anderson wrote some of the song's lyrics with David Foster of The Warriors. Foster had also written songs with Anderson on Time and a Word by Yes. According to Edward Macan, "Yours Is No Disgrace" "is generally recognized as Yes' first antiwar song" (though "Harold Land" from their debut album deals with the subject of war). Anderson has stated that the theme of the song was recognition that the kids fighting the war had no choice but to fight and that the war was not their fault. Author Bill Martin describes "Yours Is No Disgrace" as "a remarkable and subtle song about the Vietnam War." The lyrics make their point by contrasting the suffering of the soldiers in Vietnam with people partying in Las Vegas. The music critic Dave Thompson praises the line "On a sailing ship to nowhere" as "[conjuring] a mental image that the music cannot help but echo."

== Composition ==
The song begins with a staccato introduction, which builds tension right away. The introduction's main riff was contributed by Jon Anderson, and was the subject of an argument in the band since some of the other members thought it was overly derivative of the theme music for the TV series Bonanza. This is followed by Steve Howe's guitar riffs, which have been described by various critics as both joyous and menacing. Howe built up the guitar parts using overdubs, which was a new experience to him. He played the rhythm guitar tracks on a Gibson ES-175D and also used a 1953 Martin OO-18 guitar for some passages. Howe stated that he created "a 'studioized' solo because it was made up in different sections. I became three guitarists." Panning and wah-wah effects were also applied to Howe's guitars.

Ultimate Classic Rock critic Ryan Reed describes Howe's playing as "a masterwork of staccato crunch, frenetic lead twang and jazz-rock sizzle." Author Dave Simonelli remarks that the "jagged but simple related pattern of chords" that Howe plays are developed in a manner analogous to a symphony. The Village Voice critic Robert Christgau also praises Howe's playing on the song.

Howe has stated that his guitar solo on the song is one of his favourites because it was the first time he was able to overdub his parts in that manner. "Yours is No Disgrace" was recorded section by section, which Howe believed was a more manageable approach than recording the entire song from start to finish. Tony Kaye was against the idea of using any kind of synthesizers out of the studio, so Jon Anderson handled Kaye's parts on the Dewtron "Mister Bassman" bass pedal synthesizer for live performances. According to Yes biographer Chris Welch, the vocals by Anderson and Squire "exude a sense of optimism as if all past battles are finally over and nothing can now stop the band's musical odyssey."

== Track listing ==
Italy (1971)

No.	Title	Length
1.	"Yours Is No Disgrace (pt 1)"	4:45
2.	"Yours Is No Disgrace (pt 2)"	4:50

Netherlands (1971)

No.	Title	Length
1.	"Yours Is No Disgrace"	3:15
2.	"The Clap"	3:07

Netherlands (1972 re-issue)

No.	Title	Length
1.	"Yours Is No Disgrace"	5:40
2.	"Your Move"	3:28
3.	"Sweet Dreams"	3:42

== Personnel ==
Band

- Jon Anderson – lead vocals, percussion
- Chris Squire – bass guitar, backing vocals
- Steve Howe – electric & acoustic guitars, backing vocals
- Tony Kaye – Hammond organ, Moog
- Bill Bruford – drums, percussion

== See also ==
- List of anti-war songs

== Bibliography ==
- Dimery, Robert 1001 Albums You Must Hear Before You Die New York: Quintet Publishing Limited, 2005. ISBN 9780789313713
- Covach, John Rudolph and Boone, Graeme MacDonald Understanding Rock: Essays in Musical Analysis New York: Oxford University Press, 1997. ISBN 0195100050
