= Big Generator =

1987 studio album by Yes

- Vinyl cover

Studio album by Yes
- Released: 28 September 1987
- Recorded: 1985–1987
- Studios: Lark Recording (Carimate); Sarm East (London); Sarm West (London); AIR (London); Southcombe (Los Angeles); Westlake (Los Angeles); Sunset Sound (Los Angeles)
- Genre: Pop rock
- Length: 43:14
- Label: Atco
- Producers: Yes; Trevor Horn; Trevor Rabin; Paul DeVilliers

Yes chronology
9012Live: The Solos (1985)	Big Generator (1987)	Union (1991)

Singles from Big Generator
- 1. "Love Will Find a Way" Released: 14 September 1987; 2. "Rhythm of Love" Released: 7 December 1987

Big Generator is the twelfth studio album by the English progressive rock band Yes, released on 28 September 1987 by Atco Records. It was the band's final studio album of original material for the label, as well as their last studio album of the 1980s to feature lead vocalist Jon Anderson. Following the world tour for their highly successful album 90125 (1983)—which established a shift from their traditional 1970s progressive rock sound toward a commercially accessible, pop-oriented direction—the band began working on a follow-up in 1985 with returning producer Trevor Horn.

The recording process was highly fraught and protracted, spanning two years due to severe internal and creative gridlock within the group. Sessions originally commenced inside a castle in Carimate, Italy, in an attempt to foster band chemistry. However, the period was marred by unproductive writing sessions and an increasingly toxic interpersonal atmosphere. Creative progress was further strained by Horn's decision to deliberately exclude Anderson from the initial writing and rehearsal sessions. Production subsequently relocated to London, but escalating creative differences persisted, ultimately prompting Horn to abandon the project. The unfinished album was moved once more to Los Angeles, where guitarist Trevor Rabin and engineer Paul DeVilliers assumed co-production duties to finalise the tracks. Musically, the album continued the pop-rock and dance-rock direction of 90125, emphasising Rabin's polished guitar work, intricate keyboard textures, and layered vocal harmonies on mainstream rock tracks like "Love Will Find a Way" and "Rhythm of Love", alongside more experimental arrangements such as "Shoot High Aim Low" and "Final Eyes".

Big Generator received mixed reviews from music critics upon release, with commentators divided over its heavy reliance on high-tech 1980s production techniques. It reached number 15 on the US Billboard 200 and number 17 on the UK Albums Chart. The album yielded two Top 40 singles on the US Billboard Hot 100: "Love Will Find a Way" and "Rhythm of Love". In April 1988, Big Generator was certified platinum by the Recording Industry Association of America (RIAA) for sales exceeding one million copies in the United States. Like its predecessor, it received a Grammy Award nomination for Best Rock Performance by a Duo or Group with Vocal. Yes supported the album with a tour of North America and Japan, after which Anderson departed the band for a second time.

== Background ==
In February 1985, the Yes line-up of lead vocalist Jon Anderson, bassist Chris Squire, keyboardist Tony Kaye, drummer Alan White, and guitarist and vocalist Trevor Rabin concluded a twelve-month world tour in support of 90125 (1983). The album had marked a significant commercial and stylistic shift for the group, moving away from the progressive rock sound that defined their 1970s work toward accessible, pop-oriented rock. Driven by Rabin's demos and the production of Trevor Horn, 90125 became the most commercially successful album of the band's career. It yielded their first and only number-one single on the US Billboard Hot 100, "Owner of a Lonely Heart", and earned the group a Grammy Award for Best Rock Instrumental Performance for the track "Cinema". Following the tour's completion, the band took a six-month hiatus before reconvening to record a follow-up.

Rehearsals for the new album began in Hollywood, California, in August 1985, with Horn returning as producer. The band faced intense pressure from their label, Atco Records, to replicate the multi-platinum success and hit-single formula of 90125. Rabin felt restricted by these commercial demands, stating a preference to distance the band from their immediate past and pursue a different creative direction regardless of its commercial outcome. Internal creative friction quickly emerged regarding the musical direction of the album. Anderson, hoping to build upon the band's expanded fanbase, wanted to develop "more adventurous" arrangements that extended the musicianship of the ensemble. Horn and the remaining band members disagreed with this approach. Seeking to mirror the writing process used for 90125—where vocal arrangements were added to pre-established backing tracks—Horn isolated Anderson from the initial writing sessions. Anderson later characterised this isolation as a "big mistake" that disrupted the band's collective energy; he had intended to push Rabin toward experimental, aggressive arrangements, describing his vision as a "Stravinsky-ism" where the music would "go crazy wild" before collapsing into silence. Conversely, Kaye recalled that the group entered the studio without a definitive plan. While Rabin had accumulated a large backlog of songs with pre-written lyrics and structures, he purposefully refrained from forcing them onto the band in order to foster a collaborative environment. However, Kaye noted that the band avoided material based heavily on pure improvisation, opting instead for structured arrangements.

The album's title was taken from a line in the band's 1985 concert film, 9012Live. During a colourised art segment featured at the end of the film, an actor states, "It's the rhythm of big generators." The phrase resonated with the band members, who subsequently adopted it as the title for the project.

== Recording ==
=== Musical influence and equipment ===
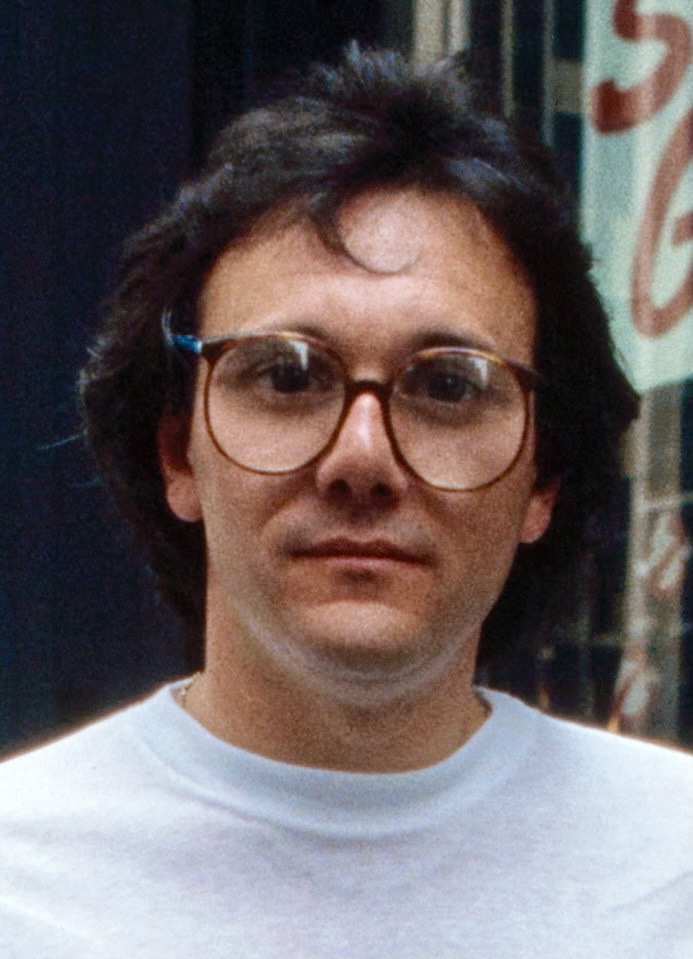
Producer Trevor Horn (pictured in 1984) helmed the early tracking sessions, though creative gridlock eventually led to his departure.

At the beginning of the songwriting process, Rabin recalled that the group used the Beatles' Abbey Road (1969) as a structural model for the music on Big Generator. Rabin explained that the band wanted to avoid pressuring themselves into forcing every fragment into a conventional song structure, choosing instead to let standalone ideas exist naturally without pasting on weak hooks or choruses. This fragment-based approach led to a track list featuring arrangements significantly longer than typical pop songs of the era, with tracks peaking in excess of seven minutes in length. Rabin noted that Kaye played a larger role on Big Generator than he had on 90125. However, ongoing interpersonal clashes between Kaye and Horn meant that Kaye recorded many of his keyboard tracks in a separate studio space away from Horn. Despite Kaye's increased involvement, Rabin still performed a significant portion of the keyboards on the final record.

Kaye's primary instrument during the sessions was the Korg DW-8000 synthesizer, which he used to replicate Hammond organ and acoustic piano sounds. He also incorporated a Roland D-50 synthesizer and a custom-built Oberheim DPX-1 rack unit integrated with a hard disk system to minimise disk-swapping during performances. While recording in London the group recorded utilising an expensive Synclavier system housed in an isolated upstairs room above the main studio tracking floor. Basic backing arrangements were fed from the main studio up to the Synclavier, where Kaye performed his parts, before the digital tracks were fed back down to tape onto the main studio's Sony digital multi-track recorders. Simultaneously, White worked closely with sound technologist Reek Havoc to integrate a Dynacord Add-One digital drum system into his setup, using both electronic trigger pads and an acoustic kit to trigger stereo sound samples.

=== Italy, London, and Los Angeles sessions ===
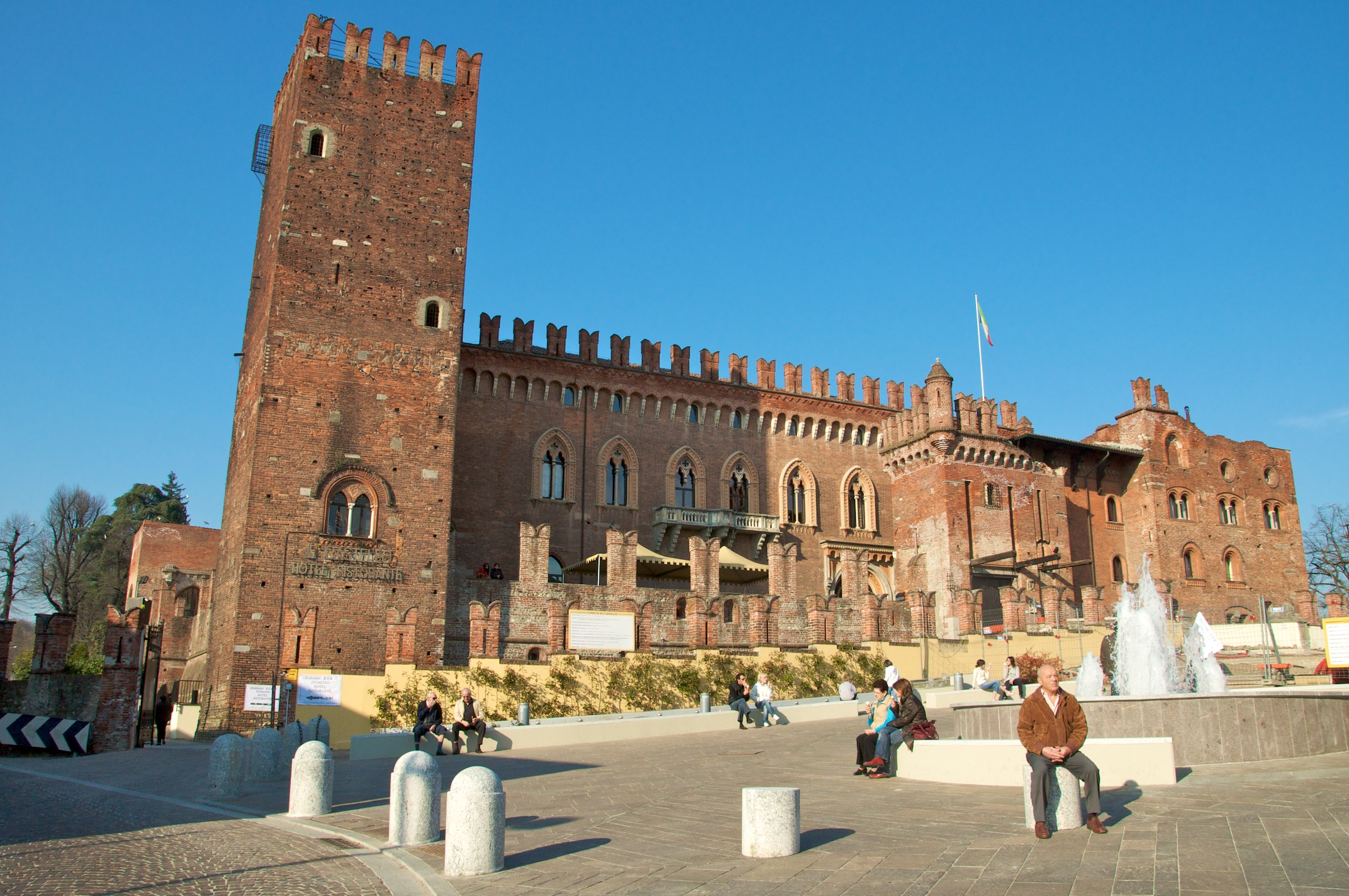
Recording sessions for Big Generator originally commenced at Lark Studios, located inside the 14th-century Carimate Castle in Italy.

At Rabin's recommendation, the band initially agreed to record at Lark Recording Studios, a facility located at Castello di Carimate in Carimate, Italy. Rabin believed that isolating the band members in an historic, remote environment would encourage them to bond socially and spark new musical ideas. However, bassist Squire criticised the location choice, claiming that Rabin selected the Italian studio purely as a tax shelter and a way to minimize production expenses—an assertion Rabin later denied, stating that saving money was never the primary intent. The sessions quickly deteriorated, and Squire recalled that the band spent more time arguing over recording equipment options than writing actual music. Rabin later noted that the friction between vocalist Jon Anderson and Squire left a creative vacuum that allowed him to work independently on his own ideas. After three months in Carimate, the band had completed most of the core rhythm tracks, but progress ground to a halt. Rabin recalled that the period dissolved into "a real drug time" with excessive partying and a severe lack of focus among unnamed members of the group. Recognizing the lack of productivity, Horn suggested they abandon the Italian sessions and return to the United Kingdom.

Recording resumed in London, where the band tracked material across SARM East, SARM West, and AIR Studios over the course of several months. The change of location failed to heal the deep stylistic divisions between the members. Frustrated by the corporate atmosphere of the group, Horn found himself completely unable to finish producing the tracks due to the unyielding gridlock. He formally resigned from the project, later describing the environment not as a working creative committee, but as "warring factions trying to kill each other." Rabin later noted that Horn's exit was accelerated by intense personal and musical disagreements with both Anderson and Kaye. Seeking an environment where he could work without group interference, Rabin recalled that his happiest moment of the London sessions occurred when he snuck into the studio alone on a Sunday to work by himself.

Recognizing that the sessions had stalled entirely, Rabin decided to move the entire project across the Atlantic in early 1987 and brought the unfinished master tapes home to Los Angeles, California. Production was finalised across Southcombe, Westlake, and Sunset Sound Studios with the assistance of producer and engineer Paul DeVilliers, who had previously served as the live sound mixer on the band's 90125 tour. Rabin also performed extensive solo tracking at his 24-track home studio in the Hollywood Hills, a positive working experience that convinced him to build his own dedicated facility.

The two-year process was financially draining and personally exhausting, with Rabin estimating the final production costs reached $2 million. Reflecting on the final stretch of production, Rabin revealed that the pressure was too much: "I had to salvage the whole thing and mix it on my own with no one in the studio. It was traumatic. My stomach lining went, but I did finish the record." Devastated by the ordeal, Rabin secretly planned to use the band's Los Angeles press conference to announce his permanent resignation from Yes, but he ultimately acquiesced after his wife and his manager successfully convinced him to stay. The album's sleeve notes credited the production collectively to Yes, Rabin, DeVilliers, and Horn.

== Songs ==
=== Side one ===
The album's opening track, "Rhythm of Love", was co-written by Kaye, Rabin, Squire, and Anderson. Rabin conceived the track's lyrical theme as a deliberate exploration of romantic and physical attraction. He felt that the band's transition into mainstream rock with "Owner of a Lonely Heart" on 90125 (1983) had successfully distanced Yes from the dense, cosmic-inspired lyricism that defined their 1970s progressive rock era, and viewed a more direct theme as a playful departure from their past work. While Anderson acknowledged that the ensemble strongly supported the commercial appeal of the song's primary chorus, he initially expressed reservations regarding the explicit nature of the draft. To reach a compromise, Anderson requested that the lyrics be refined, ultimately altering several specific words to fit his vocal delivery.

"Big Generator" is one of three songs on the album credited collectively to the entire band. The composition originated from an initial musical idea developed by Squire and Rabin. Its signature, heavy opening progression was created using a specific drop-A tuning configuration on Squire's Tobias five-string bass guitar, with Rabin tuning the low E-string of his electric guitar down to a matching A to establish a massive, unified low-end register. White then constructed his parts around this foundation. During the song's early tracking stages, White felt the arrangement lacked the distinctive stylistic trademarks expected of a Yes composition. To introduce these characteristics, he instructed the rest of the band to record a section while deliberately ignoring his live drum tracking. White used an erratic, stop-start drumming technique designed to mimic a player falling out of time and subsequently speeding up to catch the tempo. Once the syncopated pattern was established, he inverted the rhythmic structure entirely, displacing the standard time signature by executing bass drum hits on the second and fourth beats rather than the traditional first and third beats.

"Shoot High Aim Low" is credited collectively to all five band members, and was among the few songs recorded during the initial sessions in Italy. Its atmospheric, spacious instrumentation features natural room acoustic reverb captured directly within the castle's historic dining hall, rather than utilising electronic studio effects processors. The composition originated from a basic chord progression constructed by White while experimenting with a drum machine in the studio. Upon hearing the loop, Rabin encouraged White to maintain the tempo while he improvised the song's primary vocal melody. Lyrically, the track features a contrasting dual narrative delivered through alternating lead vocals between Anderson and Rabin. Anderson's verses present a harsh, real-time depiction of warfare from the perspective of an aggressive combat helicopter pilot, inspired by the contemporary geopolitical conflicts in the Bluefields region of Nicaragua. Conversely, Rabin's interwoven vocal lines depict a peaceful, romantic encounter between a couple driving in a vehicle. Anderson summarised the overarching thematic goal of the song as an expression of humanity's need to "live beyond war". Rabin later designated "Shoot High Aim Low" as his favourite piece on Big Generator, a sentiment echoed by Anderson, who praised the track's cinematic expansiveness as a successful return to the band's classic progressive rock heritage.

Guitarist Trevor Rabin criticised the addition of a horn section on "Almost Like Love", comparing the style unfavorably to the 1980s pop-soul output of Phil Collins.

Rabin expressed dissatisfaction with "Almost Like Love", stating that the arrangement failed to coalesce effectively and expressing regret over its inclusion on the final track listing. A primary point of contention for Rabin was the prominent addition of the horn section performed by the Soul Lips Horn Ensemble. Rabin strongly opposed this addition, arguing that the brass elements pushed the band too close to commercial 1980s soul-pop music, drawing unfavourable comparisons to Phil Collins' 1985 single "Sussudio". While Squire was highly enthusiastic about the song's central instrumental bass riff, Rabin felt the surrounding musical composition was fundamentally substandard. He characterised the intense production effort spent on the arrangement as a futile exercise, comparing it to "polishing a vase while the building was falling down". Lyrically, the track reflects a rare socio-political and spiritual theme for the record, with Anderson's vocals exploring world religions and advocating for cultural and spiritual evolution.

=== Side two ===
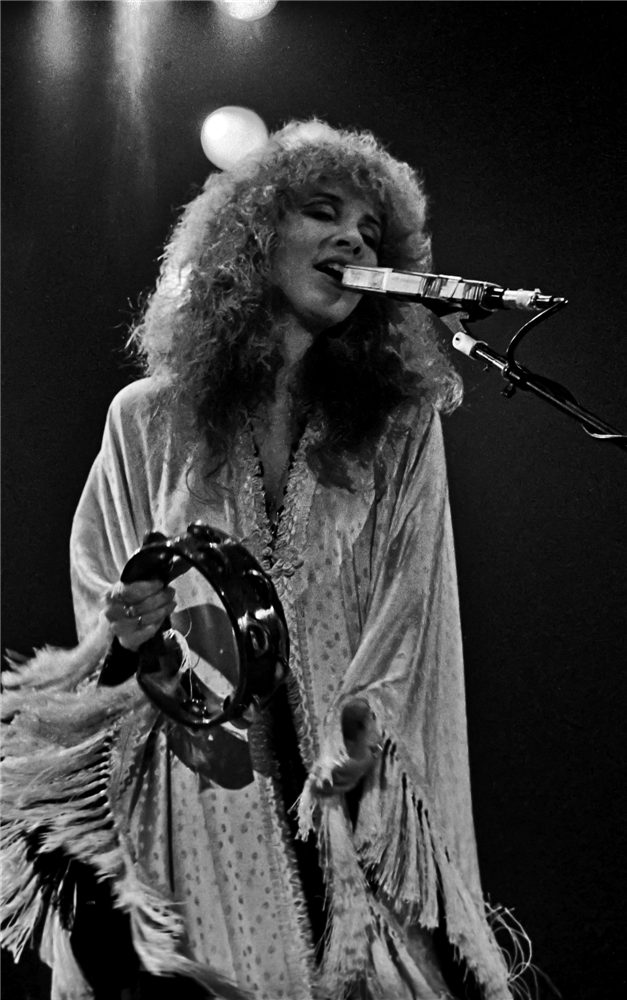
"Love Will Find a Way" was originally developed by Trevor Rabin as a collaborative track intended for Stevie Nicks.

"Love Will Find a Way" is solely credited to Rabin. Rabin initially developed the composition's music and lyrics as a collaboration with singer-songwriter Stevie Nicks, intending for Nicks to record the track for an upcoming project. However, after hearing a preliminary demo, White strongly urged Rabin to retain the song for Yes to record during the Big Generator sessions. Rabin was particularly satisfied with the thematic resonance of the song's title lyric and took a primary creative interest in composing and conducting the intricate string arrangement that serves as the tracks' introduction. Despite its commercial appeal, the track generated a polarised response from the band's core audience, with sections of the fanbase expressing concern that its straightforward pop-rock and AOR style diverged too heavily from the band's traditional progressive rock legacy.

Rabin found the production and arrangement phases of "Final Eyes" to be exceptionally challenging due to its frequent transitions in arrangement, mood, and musical style. Despite these structural difficulties, he was highly satisfied with the sparse, acoustic guitar foundation accompanying Anderson's lead vocals. Retrospectively, however, Rabin admitted that specific segments of the final mix made him uncomfortable, expressing concern that the track's polished, melodic AOR style sounded too closely aligned with the contemporary arena rock output of Journey, which, as he had also felt with "Almost Like Love", was uncharacteristic of the band's identity. Musically, the track features sweeping keyboard counter-melodies from Kaye and a collaborative bridge section where Anderson and Rabin trade vocal lines.

The seven-minute "I'm Running" is the third and final track on the album to be credited collectively to all five band members, and was tracked at SARM Studios in London. After an initial master take had been laid down, Rabin recalled that White's original drum parts were deemed sonically or structurally unusable for the final mix. As a result, White was tasked with isolating himself in the studio to completely re-record his percussion tracks "note for note" over the existing instrumentation. Musically, the song features a distinct stylistic fusion that caused internal debate; Rabin took a core instrumental riff developed by Squire and adapted it into a highly syncopated guitar arrangement featuring a prominent Latin flavour, a creative choice that initially made Squire uncomfortable. Although Rabin later admitted that he was not entirely satisfied with the track's overarching conceptual continuity, he noted that its eccentric, experimental quality ultimately made him quite fond of the piece.

"Holy Lamb (Song for Harmonic Convergence)" is credited solely to Anderson, whose composition explores the themes of the Harmonic Convergence, a synchronised global meditation event that occurred in August 1987 to raise awareness of a specific planetary alignment. Its lyrical framework originated several years earlier during an Anderson visit to Las Vegas, where a group of spiritual practitioners predicted he would eventually write a song channelling this message. Structurally, the track progresses from a delicate acoustic arrangement carried by Anderson's vocals into a full-band crescendo driven by Squire's melodic bass work and White's heavy drum downbeats. Retrospectively, Rabin expressed regret regarding the final arrangement, noting that he wished he had expanded the song's scope by composing dedicated introductory and concluding instrumental movements, similar to the treatment applied to "Soon"—the climactic final section of the epic "The Gates of Delirium" from Relayer (1974).

== Artwork ==
The visual packaging and sleeve design for Big Generator were handled by graphic designer Garry Mouat at his design studio, Assorted Images. Mouat had previously established the band's updated 1980s aesthetic by creating the minimalist computer-generated logo for 90125 (1983). Continuing the sleek, high-tech direction of its predecessor, the presentation intentionally moved away from the complex, surrealist fantasy landscapes created by the band's traditional 1970s sleeve artist, Roger Dean.

The creative direction of the sleeve design was marked by the same underlying internal tensions that complicated the record's tracking sessions. Mouat recalled that it took roughly five months simply to coordinate a singular meeting between the band members to discuss the sleeve concepts, which eventually took place at Squire's flat in Chelsea, London. During the meeting, Anderson presented a personal hand-drawn concept for the cover that featured a traditional scroll element. Mouat found the concept primitive, comparing it to an amateurish school drawing, and suggested exploring alternative, contemporary options. Rather than mediating the disagreement, the remaining band members avoided entering the debate, leaving the designer to navigate the creative impasse independently while offering polite compliance to Anderson's presentation.

== Release ==
Big Generator was released on 28 September 1987. The album enjoyed commercial success, peaking at number 15 on the US Billboard 200 during a 30-week chart run, and reaching number 17 on the UK Albums Chart. In the United States, the record achieved rapid sales milestones; it was certified gold by the Recording Industry Association of America (RIAA) on 8 December 1987 for shipping 500,000 units, and subsequently achieved platinum status on 29 April 1988 for sales exceeding one million copies. Following the commercial momentum of 90125 (1983), the record earned Yes a Grammy Award nomination for Best Rock Performance by a Duo or Group with Vocal for the second time.

The album's promotional campaign was supported by four singles. The lead single, "Love Will Find a Way", became a major radio hit, peaking at number 30 on the US Billboard Hot 100 and reaching number one on the Billboard Mainstream Rock chart. The follow-up single, "Rhythm of Love", achieved top-forty status by peaking at number 40 on the Hot 100. Two additional promotional singles, "Shoot High Aim Low" and "Final Eyes", were serviced to album rock radio, reaching numbers 11 and 20 on the Mainstream Rock chart, respectively.

In 2009, the album was digitally remastered by Japanese audio engineer Isao Kikuchi. This version was released in Japan via Warner Music Japan utilising the Super High Material CD (SHM-CD) format, featuring bonus tracks including extended remixes of "Rhythm of Love" and "Love Will Find a Way". Kikuchi's mastering configuration was later compiled and reissued globally as part of the 2013 Warner Rhino retrospective box set, The Studio Albums 1969–1987.

== Critical reception ==
Professional ratings
Review scores
Source	Rating
AllMusic	2/5 stars
The Rolling Stone Album Guide	3/5 stars

Contemporary music critics met Big Generator with mixed reviews, with much of the commentary focusing on the album's heavy reliance on dense, high-tech production values. Writing for Musician, reviewer J. D. Considine dismissed the record entirely, offering a brief review that simply read: "Just say no." Other critics were similarly divided, arguing that Trevor Rabin's polished pop-rock and dance-rock sensibilities pulled the band too far from their progressive rock heritage, while some praised the group's technical precision and ability to craft accessible hooks for contemporary radio formats.

== Tour and aftermath ==
Yes supported Big Generator with a 67-date concert tour of North America and Japan, spanning from November 1987 to April 1988. Having spent over two years isolated in tracking environments, the band deliberately adopted a scaled-back, minimalist production approach for the initial 1987 dates to prioritise musical execution and road-test the new material. However, translating the tracks to a live environment proved difficult due to the album's dense reliance on studio multi-tracking, overdubs, and intricate engineering patches rather than full-band rehearsal takes. Kaye avoided utilising sequencers on the tour as he preferred to switch and trigger samples and effects with his fingers for a more live feel, and memorised around 90 different patches.

In February 1988, the group was forced to cancel six scheduled performances after Rabin collapsed backstage following a concert in Tampa, Florida. The collapse was attributed to severe physical exhaustion, as Rabin had been performing under a high fever while suffering from the flu.

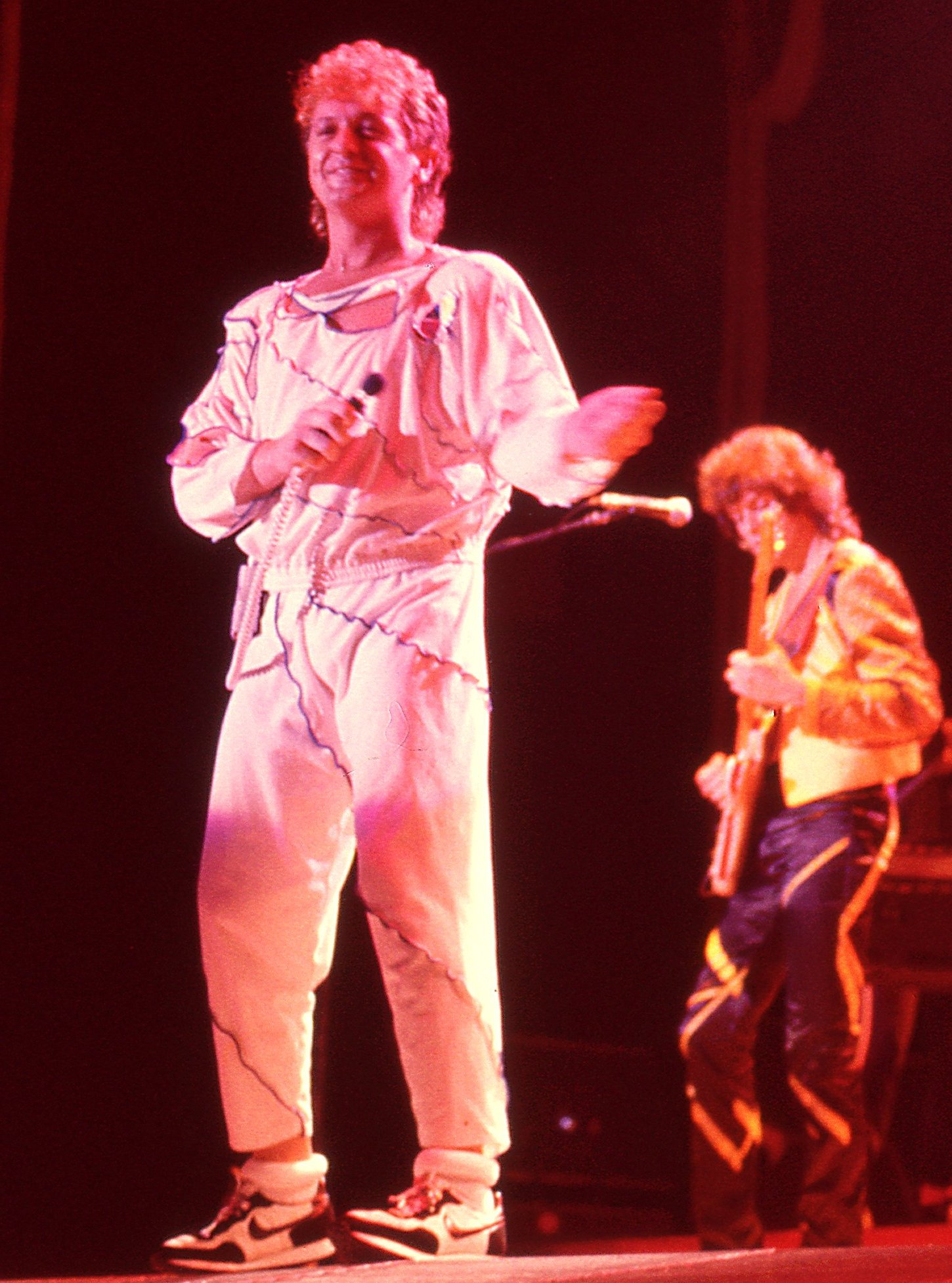
Lead vocalist Jon Anderson (pictured live in 1984) grew alienated by the band's commercial 1980s musical direction, prompting his departure following the 1988 tour dates.

Following the tour, the five band members performed together for the final time in the 1980s at the globally televised Atlantic Records 40th Anniversary celebration at Madison Square Garden on 14 May 1988. Deeply dissatisfied with the corporate, heavily commercialised musical direction of the group and the fractured writing sessions with Horn and Rabin, Anderson formally departed Yes for a second time following the broadcast. His departure reduced Yes to a four-piece and led Anderson to reunite with his 1970s progressive rock colleagues to form the competing ensemble Anderson Bruford Wakeman Howe in late 1988.

== Track listing ==
Side one
No.	Title	Writer(s)	Length
1.	"Rhythm of Love"	Tony Kaye, Trevor Rabin, Jon Anderson, Chris Squire	4:49
2.	"Big Generator"	Rabin, Kaye, Anderson, Squire, Alan White	4:31
3.	"Shoot High Aim Low"	White, Kaye, Rabin, Anderson, Squire	6:59
4.	"Almost Like Love"	Kaye, Rabin, Anderson, Squire	4:58
Total length:			21:27

Side two
No.	Title	Writer(s)	Length
1.	"Love Will Find a Way"	Rabin	4:48
2.	"Final Eyes"	Rabin, Kaye, Anderson, Squire	6:20
3.	"I'm Running"	Rabin, Squire, Anderson, Kaye, White	7:34
4.	"Holy Lamb (Song for Harmonic Convergence)"	Anderson	3:15
Total length:			21:57

2009 reissue bonus tracks
No.	Title	Length
9.	"Love Will Find a Way" (edited version)	4:18
10.	"Love Will Find a Way" (extended version)	7:11
11.	"Rhythm of Love" (Dance to the Rhythm Mix)	6:55
12.	"Rhythm of Love" (Move to the Rhythm Mix)	4:26
13.	"Rhythm of Love" (The Rhythm of Dub)	7:50
Total length:		1:14:26 (74:26)

== Personnel ==
Credits are adapted from the album's liner notes.

Yes

- Jon Anderson – vocals
- Trevor Rabin – vocals, acoustic and electric guitars, keyboards, string arrangements
- Tony Kaye – keyboards
- Chris Squire – bass guitar, backing vocals
- Alan White – drums, percussion, backing vocals

Additional musicians

- Lee Thornburg – horns on "Almost Like Love"
- Nick Lane – horns on "Almost Like Love"
- Greg Smith – horns on "Almost Like Love"
- Jimmy Zavala – horns on "Almost Like Love", harmonica on "Love Will Find a Way"

Production

- Yes – production
- Trevor Horn – production
- Trevor Rabin – production, mixing
- Paul DeVilliers – production, engineering
- Alan Goldberg – engineering
- Dave Meegan – engineering
- John Jacobs – engineering
- Paul Massey – engineering
- David Glover – engineering
- Mike "Spike" Drake – assistant engineer
- Stuart Breed – assistant engineer
- Brian Soucy – assistant engineer
- Lois Oki – assistant engineer
- Julie Last – assistant engineer
- Jimmy Preziosi – assistant engineer
- Mike Kloster – assistant engineer
- Kim Bullard – keyboard programming
- Stephen Marcussen – mastering

== Charts ==
=== Weekly charts ===
Chart (1987–88)	Peak position
Australian Albums (Australian Music Report)	44
Canada Top Albums/CDs (RPM)	14
Dutch Albums (Album Top 100)	18
Finnish Albums (The Official Finnish Charts)	34
German Albums (Offizielle Top 100)	25
Hungarian Physical Albums (MAHASZ)	21
Italian Albums (Musica e Dischi)	25
Japanese Albums (Oricon)	14
Swedish Albums (Sverigetopplistan)	14
Swiss Albums (Schweizer Hitparade)	22
UK Albums (Official Charts)	17
US Billboard 200	15

=== Year-end charts ===
Chart (1988)	Position
US Billboard 200	72

== Certifications ==
Region	Certification	Certified units/sales
Canada (Music Canada)	Platinum	100,000^{^}
Japan (RIAJ)	Gold	100,000
United States (RIAA)	Platinum	1,000,000^{^}
^{^} Shipments figures based on certification alone.
