= I've Seen All Good People =

1971 song by Yes

Song by Yes

from the album The Yes Album
- Released: 19 February 1971
- Recorded: October 1970
- Studio: Advision (London)
- Genre: Progressive rock; folk rock
- Length: 6:56; 3:35 ("Your Move"); 3:21 ("All Good People")
- Label: Atlantic
- Songwriters: Jon Anderson; Chris Squire
- Producers: Yes; Eddy Offord

Official audio
- "I've Seen All Good People" on YouTube

"Your Move"

Single by Yes

from the album The Yes Album
- B-side: "Clap"
- Released: 29 July 1971 (US)
- Recorded: October 1970
- Studio: Advision (London)
- Length: 3:00
- Label: Atlantic
- Songwriter: Jon Anderson

Yes singles chronology
"Sweet Dreams" (1970)	"Your Move" (1971)	"Roundabout" (1972)

Official audio
- "Your Move" on YouTube

"I've Seen All Good People" is a song by the English progressive rock band Yes, written by frontman Jon Anderson and bassist Chris Squire and recorded on their third studio album, The Yes Album (1971). The almost 7-minute song is in two parts; the first, titled "Your Move", was released as a single in 1971 and peaked at number 40 in the US, which helped the group build momentum. The second part is entitled "All Good People".

The song uses chess as a lyrical metaphor for navigating interpersonal relationships, and contains several allusions to the music of John Lennon. It has received positive reviews from several critics and has been considered one of Yes' best-known songs, with AllMusic's Mike DeGagne stating that "the harmonies are resilient from start to finish" and that the track "still stands as one of their most appealing" works. Music critic Robert Christgau has also singled it out for praise.

== Composition ==
The song opens with Jon Anderson, Chris Squire and Steve Howe singing the sentence "I've seen all good people turn their heads each day / so satisfied, I'm on my way" twice a cappella, in three-part harmony. This is followed by a solo intro played by Steve Howe. As Howe's guitar begins a repeated four-bar phrase, it is joined by bass drum and bass guitar as Anderson resumes singing the lyrics, solo and in three-part harmony. Dual recorders enter on the third verse. Finally, a Hammond organ joins them, playing the same chords as Howe's guitar until the first part of the song ends on a loudly sustained and unresolved organ chord.

The second part, "All Good People", consists of many repetitions of the sentence "I've seen all good people turn their heads each day / so satisfied, I'm on my way" sung to the same melody as before, but over a driving rock accompaniment, ending in a powerful vocal harmony and organ phrase which begins on a chord progression of E, D, C, G, then A. Each repetition of the verse is one whole step lower than the previous as the song fades out. Anderson has stated that he wanted to have the song develop quietly but then open up into a big grandiose, church organ sound.

The Village Voice critic Robert Christgau called the song a "great cut", being one in which he thought Yes' "arty eclecticism comes together." Record World said that "Your Move" is "very pretty."

== Recording ==
"I've Seen All Good People" is split into two sections: "Your Move" and "All Good People". While the band was rehearsing the "Your Move" portion of "I've Seen All Good People", Anderson advised Chris Squire and Bill Bruford to maintain a simple pattern that resembled a heartbeat. The bass and kick were recorded before the vocals, which proved to be challenging to synchronize. As such, Eddy Offord created a loop lasting a couple of bars onto quarter-inch recording tape, which was then placed on Track 2. Howe then recorded a rhythm guitar part on what Offord said was a 12-stringed Portuguese instrument.

Bruford recorded two tracks of shakers, after which Tony Kaye overdubbed a Hammond organ. Offord placed to microphones on top of the Leslie speaker and another on the bottom to capture the low frequencies of the instrument, which were then combined into a single channel. This was augmented by a Dewtron Mister Bassman, which was a set of bass pedals.

Anderson recorded his lead vocals using a Neumann U 64 microphone after the basic tracks were completed. The vocal harmonies were recorded with Anderson covering the upper harmony, Squire singing the middle harmony, and Howe recording the low harmony. These parts were recorded separately onto their own tracks and doubled, which were then condensed down to two tracks to allow for further overdubs.

== Lyrics ==
The first part of the song, "Your Move", alludes to the game of chess as a metaphor for male–female relationships. Examples include the phrases "move me onto any black square" and "make the white queen run so fast".

A reference to John Lennon's work is in the lyric "send an instant karma to me", with "Instant Karma!" being a single released by Lennon in 1970. Another reference occurs just before the three-minute mark of the song, in the closing moments of "Your Move", where the chorus of Lennon's song "Give Peace a Chance" is sung by the backing vocalists under the main melody.

More generally, Anderson has stated that the line "'cause it's time, it's time in time with your time" was an attempt to say that he would "do anything that is required of me to reach God" and that he wants the listener to feel "in tune and in time with God."

== Personnel ==
Yes

- Jon Anderson – lead vocals, percussion
- Chris Squire – bass guitar, backing vocals, bass pedals
- Steve Howe – laúd (erroneously listed as "vachiala"), electric guitars, backing vocals
- Tony Kaye – Hammond organ, piano
- Bill Bruford – drums, percussion

Additional musicians

- Colin Goldring – recorder on "Your Move"

== Charts ==
Chart (1971)	Peak position
Australian Singles (Kent Music Report)	32
US Billboard Hot 100	40

== Other uses ==
The song has been included on several compilation albums, such as 1981's Classic Yes and 2004's The Ultimate Yes, since its initial release on The Yes Album in 1971. It has been performed during many of Yes' concert tours, and appears on many of Yes' live albums. As of 2021, the most recent live album to feature the song is The Royal Affair Tour: Live from Las Vegas, which was recorded in July 2019 and released in October 2020.

The song appears on the soundtrack of the film Almost Famous. The song is also featured in the films Dick, Mr. Deeds, The Family Fang, and Dead Man's Wire.
