= Roundabout (Yes song) =

1972 single by Yes

- Cover of the Dutch release of the single

Single by Yes

from the album Fragile
- B-side: "Long Distance Runaround"
- Released: 4 January 1972 (US)
- Recorded: August–September 1971
- Studio: Advision, Fitzrovia, London
- Genre: Progressive rock
- Length: 8:29 (album version); 3:27 (single version)
- Label: Atlantic
- Songwriters: Jon Anderson; Steve Howe
- Producers: Yes; Eddy Offord

Yes singles chronology
"Your Move" (1971)	"Roundabout" (1972)	"America" (1972)

"Roundabout" is a song by the English progressive rock band Yes from their fourth studio album Fragile, released in November 1971. It was written by singer Jon Anderson and guitarist Steve Howe and produced by the band and Eddy Offord. The song originated when the band were on tour and travelled from Aberdeen to Glasgow, and went through many roundabouts on the way.

The song was released as an edited single in the US in January 1972 with "Long Distance Runaround", another track from Fragile, as the B-side. It peaked at number 13 on the Billboard Hot 100 and number 10 on the Cash Box Top 100 singles charts. In 1973, Anderson and Howe won a BMI Award for writing the song.

== Writing and recording ==
The song originated in March 1971 when the band were on tour promoting The Yes Album (1971), travelling from Aberdeen to Glasgow after a gig in Aviemore, Scotland. They encountered many roundabouts on the way; Anderson claimed "maybe 40 or so", which inspired Anderson and Howe to write a song about the journey as they sat in the back of the band's transit van, and include the roundabouts and the surrounding mountains into the lyrics.

Anderson had smoked cannabis during the trip, "so everything was vivid and mystical". Anderson added: "It was a cloudy day, we couldn't see the top of the mountains. We could only see the clouds because it was sheer straight up ... I remember saying, 'Oh, the mountains–look! They're coming out of the sky!'" He began to write the song's lyrics in his notebook in a free-form style with minimal edits: "I just loved how words sounded when I put them together."

Within 24 hours, the band had arrived back home in London where Anderson reunited with his then wife Jennifer, which inspired the song's lyric "Twenty-four before my love, you'll see, I'll be there with you". A loch they passed as they neared Glasgow became the idea behind the line "In and around the lake". Upon their arrival at their hotel in Glasgow, Anderson and Howe began to put down song ideas on their recorder.

In August 1971, Yes regrouped in London to prepare material for their fourth album, Fragile (1971). Early into the sessions, keyboardist Tony Kaye was fired from the group over his lack of interest in learning more keyboards to expand the band's sound, and was replaced by Rick Wakeman. The group then moved to Advision Studios in September 1971 to record Fragile with audio engineer Eddy Offord as their co-producer, using a 16-track recording machine to layer their ideas, at which point, Howe later said, "The song became pure magic". The rhythm tracks were recorded first, in separate sections. Fragile contains four group-performed songs with five solo tracks written and arranged by each member; "Roundabout" is one of such collaborative tracks.

== Composition ==
Howe recalled the track was originally "a guitar instrumental suite" and had a basic outline worked out when he first developed it. "All the ingredients are there—all that's missing is the song. "Roundabout" was a bit like that; there was a structure, a melody and a few lines." In 1994, former Yes guitarist Peter Banks whom Howe replaced in 1970, claimed he had come up with the song's main riff several years prior to the band recording it. The song was recorded in sections in a series of tape edits, a method of recording that was still relatively new to the group. They had played it through in rehearsal several times, but Squire recalled the group would make sure to "get the first two verses really good" and record from there.

In its original form, the song began with the acoustic guitar, which Howe played on a 1953 Martin 00–18, but the group soon thought a more dramatic opening was needed. This led to Wakeman playing an Em chord, alternating with a C chord on the piano that were recorded and played backwards, creating an effect that Howe described "as if it's rushing towards you". Offord recalled a considerable amount of time was spent to get it right in the studio because it involved a lengthy process of picking the right voicings to use, and editing them correctly. Howe thought the piano added a sense of drama, intensity, and colour to the song. An early idea had the song start with what Anderson described as "something of a Scottish jig" on Howe's acoustic guitar, which he had played to Anderson in their Glasgow hotel room.

Chris Squire played his bass guitar parts on a Rickenbacker and in the final verse, overdubbed his line using Howe's Gibson ES-150 electric guitar. To complement Squire's playing, Wakeman played arpeggios on his Hammond C3 organ on his right hand while playing Squire's bass parts with his left. For the song's slower section, he plays an organ arpeggio and flute sounds on a Mellotron which he said gave the section a "Strawberry Fields mood". Apart from his acoustic guitar, Howe plays a 1961 electric Gibson ES-5 Switchmaster throughout the song. Anderson noted the music has a "Scottish feel" to it and described the solo part as like a reel, a traditional Scottish country dance. Wakeman's Hammond organ solo was recorded in one take.

Once the instrumental tracks had been put down, Anderson entered the studio early one morning and recorded his lead vocals. When the rest of the group arrived, they recorded the vocal harmonies. At the end of the song, Anderson, Squire and Howe perform three-part harmonies that are repeated eight times, during which they also sing a second harmony part that Anderson said resembles the main melody to the nursery rhyme "Three Blind Mice". He later revealed Wakeman is singing the notes to the rhyme which was placed "against the grain of what we were doing" to make it sound more intriguing. To close, Howe repeated his acoustic guitar introduction but ended on an E major chord.

== Release ==
"Roundabout" was first released as the opening track on Fragile, in November 1971 on Atlantic Records. In preparation for its release as a single in the US, the song was cut to 3:27 to make it more suitable for radio airplay. Some changes include an abridged instrumental intro, which forgoes the 40 second nylon string passage played by Howe and skips the second hearing of the bass riff. It was released, with "Long Distance Runaround" on the B-side, another group written track on Fragile, on 4 January 1972. Record World said that "If, as it seems, the time has come to say yes to Yes, then this drastically-chopped cut pulled from the new Fragile album will succeed mightily" and praised the harmonies. The song peaked at number 13 on the US Billboard Hot 100 singles chart, the band's highest-charting single on the chart until 1983 with "Owner of a Lonely Heart". Elsewhere, "Roundabout" went to number 23 on the Dutch Top 40 chart. Billboard ranked it at number 91 on its Year-End Hot 100 singles of 1972. The full-length, album version was used as a B-side in 1973 and a live version was released as a bonus single in copies of Classic Yes in 1981.

In June 1973, Anderson and Howe won a BMI Award for the top songwriting and publishing awards held by Broadcast Music, Inc. for 1972.

== Legacy ==
"Roundabout" has become one of the best-known Yes songs; it has been performed at nearly every concert since its release, and is widely regarded as one of the band's greatest compositions. It was used as the theme music for the BBC concert programme Sounds for Saturday. "Roundabout" was used in Outside Providence (1999). In the 2003 film School of Rock, Dewey Finn recommends the song and its keyboard solo to one of his students, saying that "it will blow the classical music out your butt". In the DVD commentary for the film, Jack Black says that the keyboard solo is his favorite in any song. "Roundabout" is a playable track in the music game Rock Band 3, but has an extra harmonic at the beginning of the song. The song is referenced in the Season 4 episode of The Venture Bros. "Perchance to Dean", in which a similar melody is played like the ending to the actual track.

David Slavković of Ultimate-Guitar wrote, "Younger generations might remember the song ["Roundabout" by Yes] as a meme. But no matter how you got to it, there's no denying that [it] is one of the most important rock pieces of all time. Just take a listen to that bass."

=== JoJo's Bizarre Adventure ===
In 2012, "Roundabout" was used as the ending theme song for the first season of the JoJo's Bizarre Adventure anime series. According to the director, "Roundabout" was one of many songs JoJo creator Hirohiko Araki listened to when he wrote the original manga.

The usage of "Roundabout" within JoJo's Bizarre Adventure has additionally led to both it and the series' "To Be Continued" insert becoming a collective internet meme, in which videos, most notably of events that happen in real life, feature the song's introductory acoustic guitar riff before coinciding with the "To Be Continued" insert, typically freeze-framing at a point where an accident, injury or death seems imminent. The meme was referenced at the ending of the Family Guy Season 20 episode, "Brief Encounter" where Stewie Griffin asks Brian Griffin if he wants to close the episode with the meme in a fourth wall break, where Stewie shoots Brian with a bazooka and kills him at the start of the meme closing the episode.

"Roundabout" was used again as the ending theme for the season finale of JoJo's Bizarre Adventure: Stone Ocean.

=== Other ===
"Roundabout" was played during Yes' induction to the Rock and Roll Hall of Fame in 2017. The song was performed by keyboardist Rick Wakeman, vocalist Jon Anderson, guitarists Steve Howe and Trevor Rabin, and drummer Alan White with Rush bassist Geddy Lee filling in for Chris Squire, who died in 2015.

A cover version of this song, by Todd Rundgren, John Wesley, and Tony Kaye can be heard in the 2018 tribute album A Life in Yes - The Chris Squire Tribute.

== Personnel ==
- Jon Anderson – vocals
- Steve Howe – electric and acoustic guitars, backing vocals
- Chris Squire – bass guitar, backing vocals
- Rick Wakeman – Hammond organ, Minimoog, grand piano, Mellotron
- Bill Bruford – drums, percussion

== Charts ==
=== Weekly charts ===
Chart (1972)	Peak position
Canada Top Singles (RPM)	9
Netherlands (Single Top 100)	27
Japan Hot 100 (Billboard)	72
US Billboard Hot 100	13
US Cash Box Top 100	10

=== Year-end charts ===
Chart (1972)	Peak position
US Billboard Hot 100	91
US Cash Box Top 100	90
US Opus	86
