= The Steven Wilson Remixes =

Box set by Yes
- Released: 29 June 2018
- Genre: Progressive rock
- Length: 242:41
- Labels: Atlantic; Rhino
- Producers: Yes; Eddy Offord

Yes chronology
Fly from Here – Return Trip (2018)	The Steven Wilson Remixes (2018)	Yes 50 Live (2019)

Professional ratings
Review scores
Source	Rating
Vintage Rock	Favorable
AllMusic	4.5/5 stars
Sound and Vision	4.5/5 stars

The Steven Wilson Remixes is a box set by the English progressive rock band Yes. Released on 29 June 2018, it compiles remixed versions of five of the band's albums—The Yes Album (1971), Fragile (1971), Close to the Edge (1972), Tales from Topographic Oceans (1973), and Relayer (1974)—overseen by Steven Wilson.

== Background ==
The remixes were originally released one-by-one from 2013 through 2016: Close to the Edge was the first to receive a remix, followed by The Yes Album in 2014, Fragile in 2015 and Tales from Topographic Oceans and Relayer in 2016. Roger Dean, a longtime associate of the band, created alternate covers for Close to the Edge and Tales from Topographic Oceans; the other albums' covers received minor alterations. Mike Mettler of Sound and Vision also rated the set 4.5 out of 5 stars and praised the sound quality of the set, although he lamented the lack of liner notes detailing the remix process.

== Reception ==
The remixed editions of the albums received positive reviews from critics. Ralph Greco, Jr. of Vintage Rock praised the newfound separation of the instruments in each album, singling Fragile, Close to the Edge, and Tales from Topographic Oceans in particular for their enhancements. In a review for AllMusic, Thom Jurek awarded the box set 4.5 out of 5 stars and claimed that Relayer in particular has "arguably never [been] heard until this mix".

== Track listing ==
=== The Yes Album ===
Side one

1. "Yours Is No Disgrace" (Jon Anderson, Chris Squire, Steve Howe, Tony Kaye, Bill Bruford) – 9:40
2. "Clap" (Howe) – 3:16
3. "Starship Trooper" – 9:29
  - "Life Seeker" (Anderson)
  - "Disillusion" (Squire)
  - "Würm" (Howe)

Side two

1. "I've Seen All Good People" – 6:55
  - "Your Move" (Anderson)
  - "All Good People" (Squire)
2. "A Venture" (Anderson) – 3:20
3. "Perpetual Change" (Anderson, Squire) – 8:57

=== Fragile ===
Side one

1. "Roundabout" (Anderson, Howe) – 8:29
2. "Cans and Brahms" (Johannes Brahms, arranged by Rick Wakeman) – 1:34
3. "We Have Heaven" (Anderson) – 1:38
4. "South Side of the Sky" (Anderson, Squire) – 7:57

Side two

1. "Five Per Cent for Nothing" (Bruford) – 0:35
2. "Long Distance Runaround" (Anderson) – 3:28
3. "The Fish (Schindleria Praematurus)" (Squire) – 2:36
4. "Mood for a Day" (Howe) – 2:55
5. "Heart of the Sunrise" (Anderson, Squire, Bruford) – 10:34

=== Close to the Edge ===
Side one

1. "Close to the Edge" – 18:43
  - "The Solid Time of Change" (Anderson, Howe)
  - "Total Mass Retain" (Anderson, Howe)
  - "I Get Up, I Get Down" (Anderson, Howe)
  - "Seasons of Man" (Anderson, Howe)

Side two

1. "And You and I" – 10:12
  - "Cord of Life" (Anderson, Squire, Howe, Bruford)
  - "Eclipse" (Anderson, Squire, Bruford)
  - "The Preacher, the Teacher" (Anderson, Squire, Howe, Bruford)
  - "Apocalypse" (Anderson, Squire, Howe, Bruford)
2. "Siberian Khatru" (Anderson, Howe, Wakeman) – 8:56

=== Tales from Topographic Oceans ===
All tracks written by Yes.

Side one

1. "The Revealing Science of God (Dance of the Dawn)" – 22:01

Side two

1. "The Remembering (High the Memory)" – 20:38

Side three

1. "The Ancient (Giants Under the Sun)" – 18:34

Side four

1. "Ritual (Nous Sommes du Soleil)" – 21:35

=== Relayer ===
All tracks written by Yes.

Side one

1. "The Gates of Delirium" – 21:55

Side two

1. "Sound Chaser" – 9:25
2. "To Be Over" – 9:08

Note: Streaming editions of the album split the following multi-section pieces into separate tracks:

- The reprise of "We Have Heaven", at the end of "Heart of the Sunrise", is separated into its own track.
- "Close to the Edge" is split into four tracks, corresponding to each of its segments.
- Each song on Tales from Topographic Oceans is split into five tracks.
- "The Gates of Delirium" is split into three tracks.

== Personnel ==
On The Yes Album:

- Jon Anderson – vocals, percussion
- Chris Squire – bass guitars, vocals
- Steve Howe – electric & acoustic guitars, vachalis, vocal
- Tony Kaye – piano, organ, Moog
- Bill Bruford – drums, percussion
- Colin Goldring – recorders on "Your Move"

On Fragile:

- Jon Anderson – vocals
- Bill Bruford – drums, percussion
- Steve Howe – electric and acoustic guitars, vocals
- Chris Squire – bass guitars, vocals
- Rick Wakeman – organ, grand piano, Electra Piano and Harpsichord, Mellotron, synthesiser

On Close to the Edge:

- Jon Anderson – vocals
- Bill Bruford – percussion
- Steve Howe – guitars, vocals
- Chris Squire – bass, vocals
- Rick Wakeman – keyboards

On Tales from Topographic Oceans:

- Jon Anderson
- Chris Squire
- Steve Howe
- Alan White
- Rick Wakeman

On Relayer:

- Jon Anderson
- Chris Squire
- Steve Howe
- Alan White
- Patrick Moraz

== Charts ==
Chart (2018)	Peak position
German Albums (Offizielle Top 100)	86
Scottish Albums (Official Charts)	98
UK Progressive Albums (Official Charts)	10
UK Rock & Metal Albums (Official Charts)	19
