= Five Per Cent for Nothing =

Instrumental by Yes

from the album Fragile
- Released: 12 November 1971
- Recorded: 1971
- Studio: Advision Studios
- Genre: Progressive rock; jazz fusion
- Length: 0:35
- Label: Atlantic Records
- Songwriter(s): Bill Bruford
- Producer(s): Eddy Offord

"Five Per Cent for Nothing" is an instrumental by the English progressive rock group Yes from their 1971 album Fragile. One of five tracks on the album that were meant to showcase individual members’ talents, it was composed by the band's drummer, Bill Bruford. At 35 seconds in length, it is the shortest song Yes has ever recorded and their only song credited solely to Bruford.

The band did not play it live until 2014, when they played Fragile in full. Despite its brevity, guitarist Steve Howe says it was the most challenging Yes song to perform from this album. Critics have seen it as anticipating the musical directions Bruford would take after he left Yes a year later, in his work with King Crimson and as a solo performer. Bruford himself sees it primarily as a "naïve" first attempt at songwriting.

The song was renamed from Bruford's original title, "Suddenly It's Wednesday", to spite Roy Flynn, the band's original manager, whose relationship with Yes ended during rehearsals for The Yes Album, Fragile's predecessor. The band were bitter that he had, as a condition of his departure, negotiated a deal that gave him five per cent of the band's earnings in perpetuity. Flynn said he never got any of the money he should have received from that deal, even as Yes became extremely successful in the wake of his departure. Several years later Flynn sued, eventually settling for a far smaller sum than he had asked for.

== Background ==
Early in Yes's career, Roy Flynn, manager of The Speakeasy Club in London, offered to manage them after seeing them perform. They accepted and Flynn guided their career through their first two albums, Yes and Time and a Word, released in 1969 and 1970 respectively, and the concert tours that accompanied them. While Flynn believed that his management had benefited the band, their albums, while critically praised, were not very successful commercially in their native UK and had barely registered in the larger US market. After Time and a Word, the band began to consider replacing him; original guitarist Peter Banks says he was eased out of the band in favor of Steve Howe because he was the only member who supported Flynn.

The band rented a farm outside the Devonshire village of Romansleigh to write and rehearse songs for their third album, The Yes Album, aware that their label, Atlantic Records, was expecting something with more impact. With Howe and his songwriting and musical talents on board, they began moving toward progressive rock, writing longer songs. Flynn, who had stopped managing the Speakeasy and other bands to concentrate on Yes, was paying the weekly rent on the farm from his own personal funds. He came out one weekend to pay one more week's rent on the farm and tell the band, whom he had already begun to suspect were looking to replace him, that he could no longer continue managing them.

Bassist Chris Squire had indeed found Flynn's replacement, Brian Lane, through the hairdresser they shared. Flynn negotiated a severance arrangement with Hemdale, Lane's company, that gave him 30 per cent of the band's publishing revenues, as he had started their publishing company and owned it, as well as 5 per cent of all the band's future grosses. The latter provision led to considerable resentment from the band members when they learned of it, as they did not think Flynn had done enough even when he had managed the band to deserve that much.

== Composition ==
The Yes Album brought the band the success they had sought, and they soon returned to the studio to record a fourth album, Fragile. During discussions about the new album, drummer Bill Bruford suggested that the songs be a mix of longer group compositions and shorter pieces by the individual members that showcased their individual talents. "We were well short of a full album of material we could all agree on," Bruford recalled later. He lamented that his suggestion was not quite taken as he had intended—a way to resolve ongoing conflicts amongst the members.

I suggested we all individually became 'composer-in-residence' for a day; that is, take the instrumentation, resources and talents of the group's members and use them as you like without further input or discussion from others. This was immediately misconstrued by Wakeman and Howe, both of whom did solo pieces, and Chris did a bass feature, all of which rather defeated the object.

New keyboardist Rick Wakeman, who had replaced another original member, Tony Kaye, was enthusiastic about the idea, pointing out that Yes had gained many new fans through its recent success and this would allow them to get to know the band better.

Squire and singer Jon Anderson contributed "The Fish (Schindleria praematurus)" and "We Have Heaven" respectively, short pieces in which they performed multiple parts. Howe's "Mood for A Day" was a solo acoustic piece on a classical guitar, and Wakeman's "Cans and Brahms" was a short adaptation of part of the third movement of that composer's Fourth Symphony with various keyboards taking the parts of instrument groups within the orchestra. Bruford offered a short piece, 16 bars repeated twice, in which the guitar, bass and keyboard parts are, as the album's liner notes say, "taken directly from the percussion line", i.e. triggered by beats on individual drums in the kit.

Bruford recalled later that while he had not joined Yes intending to share in the songwriting, Anderson regularly cajoled him to do so. "He'd say 'It's not enough just being the drummer'. He was right because writing was the thing and of course, that's where the money lay, eventually."

A quarter-century later, Bruford described "Five per Cent for Nothing" as "completely naive—but we've all got to start somewhere." Bruford left the band shortly after recording their next album, Close to the Edge; this instrumental was the only Yes piece crediting him alone as its composer. In 2009, asked whether he was able at that time to compose, Bruford said "I wasn't that pig-ignorant; I knew a few chords and could write Fmi7 on a piece of paper. I can't remember a time when I didn't know what a 12-bar blues was or a 2-5-1 progression." To him, the experience proved the point of his original proposal for the solo-composed pieces. "I had no assistance and obviously could have used some! If nothing else, the exercise proved we were better as a band than as a bunch of solo artists."

Bruford had originally titled the piece "Suddenly It's Wednesday". But Anderson and Squire were still bitter about Flynn, whose two years managing the band Bruford later recalled as time in which Yes "managed only to tread water, run red lights and lose money at gigs in Kidderminster that cost us more to do than we were paid", receiving a share of the band's earnings from then on as well 30 per cent of their publishing revenues. So Bruford's piece was retitled "Five per Cent for Nothing", as a protest.

== Piece ==
Five per Cent for Nothing

Audio
- In its entirety, on SoundCloud

Video
- Drum tutorial for the piece on YouTube

On "Five per Cent for Nothing", Bruford plays an intricate line on snare, hi-hat and bass drum in 4/4 time at a tempo of approximately 116 beats per minute. Howe and Squire play short staccato ascending and descending syncopated three-note lines on overdriven electric guitar and bass, while Wakeman plays a similarly staccato organ part of suspended chords that slowly descend until they start being held and resolve to an E♭ major 7th after 12 bars. The 16 bars are then repeated.

It was the opening track on Side 2 of Fragile on its original vinyl release, between "South Side of the Sky" and "Long Distance Runaround" (on the cassette release, it is the last track on Side 1). With a running time of 35 seconds ("a tad brief", as Bruford puts it), it is the shortest track Yes has ever recorded.

== Reception ==
Contemporary reviews of Fragile say little about "Five per Cent for Nothing". Cameron Crowe, in The San Diego Door, briefly discussed it along with the four other band member solo compositions. "The musicianship is actually so innovative," he wrote of all of them, "that each of the above-described tracks is enjoyable and awesome at the same time."

Later reviewers take divergent views, many taking into account the piece's brevity. Yes biographer Chris Welch describes the piece as "33 seconds of Brufordian angst which seems to say 'I don't like the music business that much, and I'd rather be with King Crimson'", as indeed he would be a few years later. Will Romano sees its shortness as Bruford's "cheeky comment on the royalties he'd receive for the song". Society of Rock describes it as "something that could only come from a genius like Bill Bruford. It's wild and chaotic but in a good way."

Welch's comment about Bruford signaling his interest in a different musical direction than that the band was beginning to take is echoed in Stuart Chambers's commentary on "Five per Cent for Nothing". He also considers the piece "aptly titled, since it provided the least amount of hype on an otherwise innovative recording." It "did not mesh" with the other solo pieces on the album.

In a 2015 appreciation of Yes, Bill Martin Jr. sees the track as deceptively minimal, one that might have had a greater impact on rock drumming in the 1970s had it been taken more seriously.

At 35 seconds in length, it seems simply inconsequential, whereas its "idea" is interesting and possibly significant. Had the piece been developed at greater length, "Five per Cent for Nothing" could have done for rock-based percussion what "The Fish" did for bass guitar. In particular, what seems important about "Five Per Cent" is the way that Bruford puts the drums and percussion up front, without playing anything that sounds like a drum solo.

Martin finds it ironic that Bruford largely eschewed playing solos, either in concert or on record, during his career, since he believes Bruford could have played more interesting solos than Led Zeppelin's John Bonham, who made those a staple of his band's live performances. Martin also sees "Five Per Cent" as foreshadowing the directions Bruford took not only with King Crimson but in his own solo work. "The piece adds to the album, just not a whole lot," he concludes.

In their 2024 ranking of all Yes tracks, Ultimate Classic Rock placed "Five Per Cent for Nothing" at number 140, remarking: "Squonk, plonk, boink, dink. Bill Bruford clearly wasn't putting much thought into this hilarious jazz-fusion doodle, so let's follow suit in this blurb." Frank Valish, reviewing the "Super Deluxe Edition" of Fragile for Under the Radar, describes the track as "38 seconds of jittery rhythmic jive." Paul Lester, reviewing Fragile for Classic Rock, writes that the instrumental finds Bruford "inventing math rock." The Guardian's Owen Adams included the track in a 2007 list of musical "gems" that are less than a minute long, calling it the "pure essence of prog."

=== Roy Flynn ===
Many years later, Flynn recalled the title of the track, and the entire story behind it, bitterly. "The problem was," he told Welch, "I never got paid. Even when the band went to America and enjoyed big record sales, nothing ever came back to yours truly!" despite his having invested nearly all his available personal savings in the band during its early career. He never received any notifications of board meetings of the band's publishing company despite retaining his 30 per cent stake in it and serving as a director, nor any of the five per cent share of the total.

Flynn thus brought suit against the band and its new management. "I'd given up everything to manage Yes and because I didn't have enough to spend on them, I was pilloried. I had thrown my life away but obviously it wasn't enough for the gentlemen of that august orchestra!" he told Welch. Late in 1973, at his solicitor's advice, he settled for $150,000, much less than he believes he was owed but more than enough to pay the £6,000 in legal bills he owed. After that, he left the music industry and management entirely to run pubs outside Oxford.

== Performance ==
Yes did not perform "Five per Cent for Nothing" on its concert tour following the album's release, and as Bruford left the band before it toured in support of its next album, it was not part of setlists for those shows either. In 2014, after the band had gone through numerous personnel changes, it performed the piece live when, as part of its tour in support of Heaven & Earth, Squire's final album before his death the following year, it performed Fragile and Close to the Edge in their entirety.

"It's a decidedly tricky piece", Howe recalls in his 2020 memoir, All My Yesterdays. Of all the songs on the tour, he found it the most challenging to play. Alan White, who had taken over from Bruford and remained Yes's drummer until his death in 2022, was unable to adapt a groove of his own. During rehearsals, "you might have heard us struggling with this oddball musical animal that had never been played on stage by us or, presumably, anyone else. That was forty-two years of not being played on stage." He believes the reason for that is that it only made sense to do so if the band was playing the entire album from which it came.

Howe said the secret to playing it successfully was to finish together. During rehearsals he kept close track of the beat count and would cue the rest of the band to it by dropping his guitar's headstock. Even with that, it took considerable practice for all four musicians to end on the same beat.

== Reuses ==
In 1993, the Jungle Brothers hip hop group sampled "Five per Cent for Nothing" for "Troopin' on the Down Low", an unreleased track recorded during their sessions for J Beez wit the Remedy.

Ten years later, Steve Howe's son Virgil chose "Five per Cent for Nothing" as one of the less well-known Yes tracks he remixed in modern techno style for Yes Remixes. His remix lasts four minutes and 40 seconds, seven times the length of the original track, with excerpts over a different drum track complemented by electronic sounds and vocal effects.

== Personnel ==
From the album's liner notes:

- Bill Bruford – drums
- Steve Howe – electric guitar
- Chris Squire – bass guitar
- Rick Wakeman – organ

== See also ==
- 1971 in music
- Yes discography
- List of rock instrumentals
- List of diss tracks
- "Death on Two Legs (Dedicated to...)", Queen song attacking the band's former manager
- "Vanz Kant Danz", John Fogerty solo song retitled to avoid defamation suit by former manager it attacked.
