= The Yes Album =

1971 studio album by Yes

Studio album by Yes
- Released: 19 February 1971
- Recorded: 17 July 1970 ("Clap"); 11 October - 16 November 1970
- Venue: "Clap": Lyceum Theatre, London
- Studios: Advision, Fitzrovia, London
- Genre: Progressive rock
- Length: 41:38
- Label: Atlantic
- Producers: Yes; Eddie Offord

Yes chronology
| Time and a Word (1970) | The Yes Album (1971) | Fragile (1971) |

Singles from The Yes Album
- 1. "Yours Is No Disgrace" Released: June 1971 (EU); 2. "Your Move" Released: July 1971 (US)

The Yes Album is the third studio album by English progressive rock band Yes, released in the UK on 19 February 1971 and in the US on 19 March 1971 by Atlantic Records. It was the band's first album to feature guitarist Steve Howe, who replaced Peter Banks in 1970, as well as their last to feature keyboardist Tony Kaye until 1983's 90125.

The band spent mid-1970 writing and rehearsing new material at a farmhouse at Romansleigh, Devon, and the new songs were recorded at Advision Studios in London in the autumn. The album was the first by the band to feature all-original material. While the album retained close harmony singing, Kaye's Hammond organ, and Chris Squire's melodic bass, as heard on earlier releases, the new material also covered further styles including jazz piano, funk, and acoustic music. All of the band members contributed ideas, and tracks were extended in length to allow music to develop. Howe contributed a variety of guitar styles, including a Spanish laúd, and recorded the solo acoustic guitar piece "Clap", live at the Lyceum Theatre, London.

The album was a critical success and a major commercial breakthrough for Yes, who had been at risk of being dropped by Atlantic due to the commercial failures of their first two albums. It reached number 4 in the United Kingdom and number 40 in the United States, and was later certified platinum by the Recording Industry Association of America for surpassing one million copies. The album has been reissued on CD several times, and was given a Blu-ray release in 2014 remixed by Steven Wilson.

== Background ==
Yes had already recorded two albums for Atlantic Records by mid-1970, but neither had been commercially successful and the label was considering dropping them. They had replaced founding member Banks with Howe, who enjoyed playing a wider variety of styles, including folk and country music, and played a mix of electric and acoustic guitars. Singer Jon Anderson later said that Howe could "jump from one thing to the other, very fast, very talented." After some warm-up gigs with Howe, the band moved to Devon to write and rehearse new material. They arrived at a cottage in Churchill, north of Barnstaple, but felt restricted there and were not allowed to make any noise after dark. They advertised in the local paper for a new location, and moved to Langley Farm in Romansleigh, near South Molton, some 20 mi (32 km) away. Howe in particular enjoyed working on the farm, and eventually bought it. Following rehearsals, the band booked Advision Studios in London with producer Eddie Offord and spent the autumn recording. The band enjoyed the sessions, and soon had enough material ready for an album.

Several weeks into the Langley Farm rehearsals, manager Roy Flynn came to tell the band he was leaving them and taking money he believed he was owed. This put the band under severe financial stress, leaving concerts as their only source of income at the time. Flynn also owned 5 per cent of the band's publishing revenues in perpetuity; that was later terminated but it left the band bitter enough to retitle a short Bill Bruford instrumental on their next album, Fragile, "Five Per Cent for Nothing" in protest. Flynn was soon replaced by Brian Lane.

On 23 November 1970, the group were involved in a head-on vehicle collision at Basingstoke, while returning from the previous evening's gig at the Plymouth Guildhall. The band all suffered shock, and Kaye's foot was fractured. He had to do the next few gigs, and the album cover's photo shoot, with it in plaster.

Howe mostly used a Gibson ES-175 semi-acoustic guitar and a Martin 00-18 acoustic for recording, though he did attempt to play a variety of styles with the two instruments. Squire played a 1964 Rickenbacker RM1999 bass with Rotosound Swing Bass steel roundwound strings. His amplification was a Marshall 100W tube head with 4x12 cabinets. Kaye's main instruments were the Hammond organ and piano, including a solo on "A Venture". Kaye had previously played the Hammond M-100, but for this album used the B-3, a move which he saw as "a turning point". He was not interested in playing synthesizers, which had started to appear on the market. This proved to be a problem with the other members of the band, and Kaye thought his style conflicted too much with Howe's. He left the group during rehearsals for the follow-up album in mid-1971, to be replaced by Rick Wakeman.

== Songs ==
Yes had started their career as a covers band, performing radical re-arrangements of hit songs, and their first two albums included covers in this vein. The Yes Album was the first to feature group-written material in its entirety. Some familiar elements remained: Anderson, Howe and Squire sang three-part vocal harmony throughout the record, while Squire's melodic bass and Bill Bruford's spacious drumming made up their unique rhythm section.

"Yours Is No Disgrace" originated from some lyrics written by Anderson with his friend David Foster. This was combined with other short segments of music written by the band in rehearsals. Howe worked out the opening guitar riff on his own while the rest of the band took a day's holiday. The backing track was recorded by the group in sections, then edited together to make up the final piece.

Howe's solo acoustic tune, "Clap" (incorrectly titled "The Clap" in original album pressings), was influenced by Chet Atkins and Mason Williams' "Classical Gas". The piece was written to celebrate the birth of Howe's son Dylan on 4 August 1969. The version that appears on the album was recorded live at the Lyceum Theatre in London on 17 July 1970. The studio take of the piece, which was added as a bonus track on the 2003 Rhino remaster, continues into a section that would return almost unaltered in Howe's next solo acoustic piece "Mood for a Day" on their next album, Fragile.

The spacey, electronic-sounding effect in "Starship Trooper" was achieved by running the guitar backing track through a flanger. Anderson wrote the bulk of the song, while Squire wrote the "Disillusion" section in the middle. (Note: "Disillusion" evolved from an earlier song "For Everyone", live recordings of which later appeared on Something's Coming: The BBC Recordings 1969–1970 and The Word Is Live).) The closing section, "Würm" is a continuous cadenza of chords (G-E♭-C) played ad lib. It evolved from a song called "Nether Street" by Howe's earlier group, Bodast.

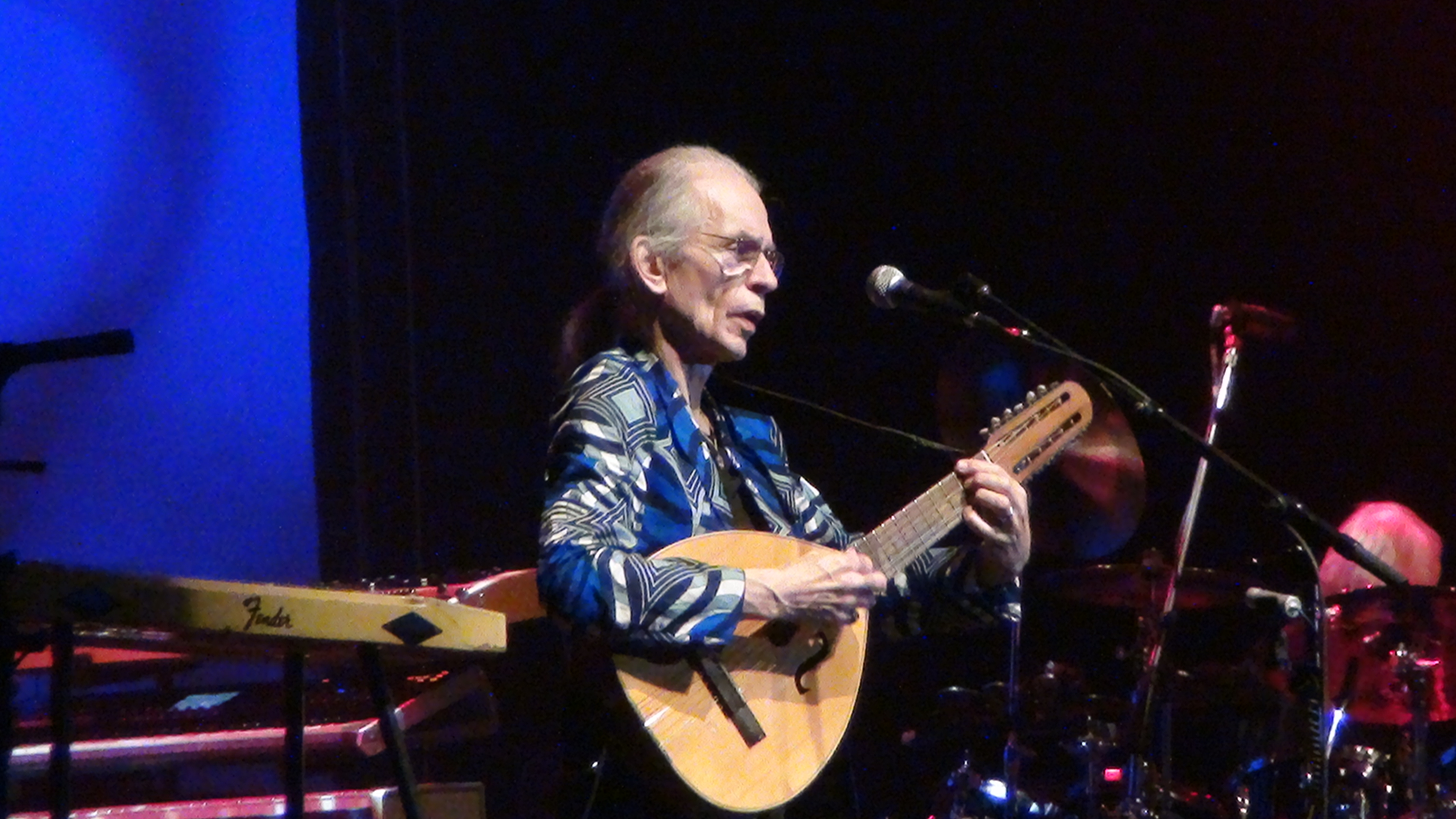
Steve Howe playing a laúd on "Your Move"

"I've Seen All Good People" is a suite of two tunes. Anderson wanted the piece to start quietly and develop, leading into a large church organ sound, before moving into the funky second movement. The band had difficulty recording the initial "Your Move" section, which was resolved by making a tape loop of bass and drums, over which Howe overdubbed a Spanish laúd, miscrediting it as a "vachalia" on the album's credits. (Note: Howe was given the instrument in the 1960s by his sister, who erroneously thought it was a Spanish guitar – for many years afterwards he described it as a Portuguese guitar. He only discovered the actual name later.) Gnidrolog's Colin Goldring played recorder on the track. The group also used a Dewtron bass pedal synthesiser on the track, which Anderson would then play in concert.

Anderson wrote "A Venture" in the studio; the song was then arranged by the rest of the band. Kaye played piano on the track, contributing a jazzy solo towards the end. Howe played a guitar solo on the original recording, but it was left off the final mix, which faded out just as it started. The song was never played live by the original group, but an arrangement was worked out when Yes decided to play the whole album live in 2013.

Anderson was inspired to write the lyrics for "Perpetual Change" by the view of the countryside from the cottage at Churchill. He thought of humans completing the Moon landing at a time when "our own environment is all fouled up", and a space mission that involved an explosion on the Moon to observe its thickness and the subsequent Pakistani floods in 1970. "So I was thinking, ok you knock the moon off its axis and you're going to mess up the world." The song opens with suspended chords played on the guitar and piano. The middle of the track features a polyrhythmic structure, where two pieces of music in different time signatures (Note: A riff in 14/8 pans to one side of the stereo while a chorus in 7/4 appears on the left) are playing simultaneously.

== Artwork ==
The front cover was shot by Phil Franks the day after the Basingstoke gig accident. Franks had already taken some photos from the Lyceum gig, but felt he needed something more for the front cover. The band showed up late having been in hospital earlier that day, and only 30 minutes were available for a shoot. Unable to get a satisfactory photo in the studio, Franks took the band round to his flat, grabbed a polystyrene mannequin head from a bin, put a 1,000 watt bulb in the kitchen light fitting, and improvised the shot. Franks credited the sleeve designer, Rolling Stone art director Jon Goodchild, for making the cover a success. When Yes performed a live version of "Yours Is No Disgrace" for the German television series Beat-Club in April 1971, footage of the band was combined with that of another mannequin head spinning over a chair, mimicking the cover's concept.

The inside of the album's gatefold sleeve shows Kaye playing a Hammond organ, while the front cover showed his leg in plaster, following the accident. Anderson is credited as "John Anderson" on the album but he had dropped the "h" from his first name by the next album, Fragile.

== Release ==
The Yes Album was released in the UK on 19 February 1971. It was a commercial success and was the band's breakthrough album, selling around 60,000 copies upon release and reaching number 4 in the UK. and number 40 in the US. It has been certified Platinum by the Recording Industry Association of America for selling over one million copies.

At that time British postal workers were on strike, preventing record stores from sending sales reports to Melody Maker, which compiled the charts most followed by the music industry. Richard Branson owned a record store on Oxford Street in London, the first business enterprise in what he later built up into Virgin Group. He began compiling a chart from sales at his store and several others; in the interim the BBC and other media used it. Lane, newly hired as the band's manager, promised them he would get their album in the charts, and did so by buying enough copies of it at the Virgin store to make it the bestselling album there and thus put it high in the charts. By the time the strike had ended, the album had started to sell well due to its initial apparent success. It remained on the charts for 34 weeks, selling over a million copies.

=== Reception ===
Professional ratings
Review scores
| Source | Rating |
|---|---|
| AllMusic | 4/5 stars |
| Christgau's Record Guide | B− |
| Pitchfork | 8.1/10 |
| Rolling Stone | (positive) |
| Rolling Stone | 4/5 stars |
| The Rolling Stone Record Guide (1979) | 5/5 stars |
| The Rolling Stone Album Guide (2004) | 3/5 stars |
| The Daily Vault | B+ |
| Encyclopedia of Popular Music | 4/5 stars |

The album had a positive reception from critics. John Koegel, writing for Rolling Stone, praised the instrumental unity between Squire, Howe and Kaye, but missed the cover songs present in the band's earlier albums. The album is one of three by Yes to appear in the book 1,000 Recordings to Hear Before You Die. Author Tom Moon preferred the group unity that he felt was missing on later releases and gave a positive impression of Anderson's vocals, saying the melodies in "I've Seen All Good People" were "instantly singable and still somehow deep." The album is also featured in the book 1001 Albums You Must Hear Before You Die. In 2000 it was voted number 317 in Colin Larkin's All Time Top 1000 Albums.

Anderson was worried about the initial response to the album, but after about a month noticed that fans started singing along at concerts, and concluded that this musical style could be developed and still remain popular. Kaye concluded that overall it was "quite a simple album, considering where Yes went onto from there." Rush singer and bassist Geddy Lee included The Yes Album among his favourite albums. Genesis keyboardist Tony Banks has said it is his favourite Yes album and that he preferred the band when Kaye was a member. "It was the addition of Steve Howe's guitar pyrotechnics that finally allowed Yes to find their true identity. The Yes Album is a giant leap forward," wrote J. D. Considine in the 2008 New Rolling Stone Album Guide.

=== Reissues ===
| Year | Label | Format | Notes |
|---|---|---|---|
| 1988 | Atlantic | CD | |
| 1994 | Atlantic | CD | Digitally remastered |
| 2003 | Rhino | CD | Digitally remastered with bonus tracks |
| 2010 | Mobile Fidelity Sound Lab | CD | Sourced from the original master tapes |
| 2013 | Rhino | CD | Part of The Studio Albums 1969–1987 |
| 2014 | Panegyric | CD/DVD and CD/Blu-ray combo packs | Contains original and new stereo mixes, as well as a 5.1 surround sound mix |
| 2023 | Rhino | Box Set | Remastered original stereo mix, new stereo mix, live disc, and bonus tracks |

The Yes Album was remastered and reissued in 2003 by Rhino Records with several bonus tracks, including a studio version of "Clap", entitled as Howe intended. In 2014, Steven Wilson of Porcupine Tree created a new stereo mix and a 5.1 surround sound mix, available as either a DVD or Blu-ray Disc. It was released on 21 April with bonus tracks including the studio version of "Clap", an extended version of "A Venture", and an alternative version of the album with live tracks, single edits, and an extended mix. The Blu-ray version also features an instrumental version of the album, a needle drop sample of the original vinyl release, and additional live tracks. More recently, it was reissued by Rhino in 2023 as a super deluxe edition, featuring the original album, instrumental tracks, studio recordings, live recordings, remixes, and other bonus tracks.

== Track listing ==
Side one
| No. | Title | Writer(s) | Length |
|---|---|---|---|
| 1. | "Yours Is No Disgrace" | Jon Anderson; Chris Squire; Steve Howe; Tony Kaye; Bill Bruford | 9:40 |
| 2. | "Clap" (instrumental) | Howe | 3:16 |
| 3. | "Starship Trooper" a. "Life Seeker" (Anderson) (3:16) b. "Disillusion" (Squire) (2:21) c. "Würm" (Howe) (3:52) | Anderson; Squire; Howe | 9:29 |
| Total length: | | | 22:25 |

Side two
| No. | Title | Writer(s) | Length |
|---|---|---|---|
| 4. | "I've Seen All Good People" a. "Your Move" (Anderson) (3:32) b. "All Good People" (Squire) (3:23) | Anderson; Squire | 6:55 |
| 5. | "A Venture" | Anderson | 3:20 |
| 6. | "Perpetual Change" | Anderson; Squire | 8:57 |
| Total length: | | | 19:12 |

2003 remaster bonus tracks
| No. | Title | Writer(s) | Length |
|---|---|---|---|
| 7. | "Your Move" (Single version) | Anderson | 3:00 |
| 8. | "Life Seeker" (Single version) | Anderson | 3:28 |
| 9. | "Clap" (Studio version) | Howe | 4:02 |
| Total length: | | | 52:07 |

=== 2023 Super Deluxe Edition ===
Disc one – Original Album Remastered
| No. | Title | Length |

Disc two – Steven Wilson 2014 Remixes & Instrumentals
| No. | Title | Writer(s) | Length |
|---|---|---|---|
| 6. | "Yours Is No Disgrace (Instrumental)" | Anderson, Squire, Howe, Kaye, Bruford | 9:43 |
| 7. | "Starship Trooper (Instrumental)" a. "Life Seeker" (Anderson) (3:16) b. "Disillusion" (Squire) (2:21) c. "Würm" (Howe) (3:52) | Anderson, Squire, Howe | 9:33 |
| 8. | "I've Seen All Good People (Instrumental)" a. "Your Move" (Anderson) (3:32) b. "All Good People" (Squire) (3:23) | Anderson, Squire | 6:59 |
| 9. | "A Venture (Instrumental)" | Anderson | 3:32 |
| 10. | "Perpetual Change (Instrumental)" | Anderson, Squire | 8:53 |

Disc three – Rarities
| No. | Title | Writer(s) | Length |
|---|---|---|---|
| 1. | "Your Move (Single Version)" | Anderson | 2:57 |
| 2. | "Starship Trooper: Life Seeker (Single Version)" | Anderson, Squire, Howe | 3:26 |
| 3. | "Clap (Studio Version)" | Howe | 4:37 |
| 4. | "A Venture (Extended Mix)" | Anderson | 4:44 |
| 5. | "Yours Is No Disgrace (Mono Version)" | Anderson, Squire, Howe, Kaye, Bruford | 9:37 |
| 6. | "Clap (Mono Version)" | Howe | 3:13 |
| 7. | "Starship Trooper (Mono Version)" a. "Life Seeker" (Anderson) (3:16) b. "Disillusion" (Squire) (2:21) c. "Würm" (Howe) (3:52) | Anderson, Squire, Howe | 9:27 |
| 8. | "I've Seen All Good People (Mono Version)" a. "Your Move" (Anderson) (3:32) b. "All Good People" (Squire) (3:23) | Anderson, Squire | 6:53 |
| 9. | "A Venture (Mono Version)" | Anderson | 3:19 |
| 10. | "Perpetual Change (Mono Version)" | Anderson, Squire | 8:51 |
| 11. | "Starship Trooper: Life Seeker (Alternate Take/Instrumental)" | Anderson, Squire, Howe | 3:23 |
| 12. | "I've Seen All Good People (Early Take)" | Anderson, Squire | 3:51 |
| 13. | "Yours Is No Disgrace (Alternate Mix)" | Anderson, Squire, Howe, Kaye, Bruford | 10:09 |

==== Disc Four – In Concert ====
Live At Konserthuset, Gothenburg, Sweden, 21 January 1971
| No. | Title | Writer(s) | Length |
|---|---|---|---|
| 1. | "I've Seen All Good People" | Anderson, Squire | 7:23 |
| 2. | "Astral Traveller" | Anderson | 7:25 |
| 3. | "Everydays" | Stephen Stills | 11:08 |

Live At The Yale Bowl, New Haven, Connecticut, 24 July 1971
| No. | Title | Writer(s) | Length |
|---|---|---|---|
| 4. | "Yours Is No Disgrace" | Anderson, Squire, Howe, Kaye, Bruford | 10:55 |
| 5. | "I've Seen All Good People" | Anderson, Squire | 8:10 |
| 6. | "Clap / Classical Gas" | Howe | 4:33 |
| 7. | "Perpetual Change" | Anderson, Squire | 15:43 |

== Personnel ==
Personnel taken from The Yes Album liner notes.

Yes

- Jon Anderson (Note: On the album sleeve, Anderson is credited under his birth name of "John".) – lead vocals, percussion
- Chris Squire – bass guitars, backing vocals
- Steve Howe – electric and acoustic guitars, Spanish laúd, backing vocals
- Tony Kaye – piano, organ, Moog synthesizer
- Bill Bruford – drums, percussion

Additional musician

- Colin Goldring – recorder on "I've Seen All Good People" ("Your Move")

Production

- Yes and Eddie Offord – production
- Eddie Offord – engineering
- Brian Lane – co-ordination
- Phil Franks – photography
- Barry Wentzell – photography
- Jon Goodchild – design

== Charts ==
=== Weekly charts ===
| Chart (1971–72) | Peak position |
|---|---|
| Canada Top Albums/CDs (RPM) | 46 |
| Dutch Albums (Album Top 100) | 7 |
| UK Albums (Official Charts) | 4 |
| US Billboard 200 | 40 |

| Chart (2014–26) | Peak position |
|---|---|
| Hungarian Physical Albums (MAHASZ) | 16 |
| UK Independent Albums (Official Charts) | 20 |
| UK Progressive Albums (Official Charts) | 28 |
| UK Rock & Metal Albums (Official Charts) | 7 |

=== Year-end charts ===
| Chart (1971) | Position |
|---|---|
| Dutch Albums (Album Top 100) | 52 |

== Certifications ==
| Region | Certification | Certified units/sales |
|---|---|---|
| United Kingdom (BPI) 2003 release | Silver | 60,000^{^} |
| United States (RIAA) | Platinum | 1,000,000^{^} |
^{^} Shipments figures based on certification alone.

== Sources ==
- Anderson, Jon (2011). "The Yes Album" (Interview). Interviewed by Redbeard. In the Studio With Redbeard. Archived from the original on 12 August 2014.
- Bruford, Bill (2009). Bill Bruford: The Autobiography. Jawbone Publishing Corp. ISBN 978-1-906002-23-7.
- Hedges, Dan (1982). Yes: An Authorized Biography. Sidgwick & Jackson. ISBN 978-0-283-98751-9.
- Howe, Steve (2021). All My Yesterdays. Omnibus Press. ISBN 9781785581793.
- Howe, Steve (17 December 2012). "Steve Howe talks The Yes Album track-by-track". Music Radar. Archived from the original on 10 December 2014.
- Kaye, Tony (2011). "The Yes Album" (Interview). Interviewed by Redbeard. In the Studio With Redbeard. Archived from the original on 12 August 2014.
- Kirkman, John (2013). Time and a Word: The Yes Interviews. Rufus Publications.
- Martin, Bill (2003). The Yes Album (Media notes). Rhino. 8122-73788-2.
- Morse, Tim (1996). Yesstories: "Yes" in Their Own Words. St Martin's Press. ISBN 978-0-312-14453-1.
- Welch, Chris (2009). Close to the Edge: The Story of Yes. Omnibus Press. ISBN 978-0-85712-042-7.
- Wooding, Dan (1978). Rick Wakeman: The Caped Crusader. Granada Publishing Limited. ISBN 978-0-7091-6487-6.
