= Fragile (Yes album) =

1971 studio album by Yes

Studio album by Yes
- Released: 12 November 1971
- Recorded: 11 August – 5 September 1971
- Studios: Advision, Fitzrovia, London
- Genre: Progressive rock
- Length: 41:16
- Label: Atlantic
- Producers: Yes; Eddy Offord

Yes chronology
The Yes Album (1971)	Fragile (1971)	Close to the Edge (1972)

Singles from Fragile
- 1. "Roundabout" Released: 4 January 1972 (US)

Fragile is the fourth studio album by the English progressive rock band Yes, released in the United Kingdom on 12 November 1971 and in the United States on 4 January 1972 by Atlantic Records. The record marked the studio debut of keyboardist Rick Wakeman, who replaced founding member Tony Kaye following the promotional tour for the band's breakthrough release, The Yes Album (1971).

The transition occurred during London rehearsals in August 1971, where internal friction over Kaye's reluctance to expand his instrumentation past the standard organ and piano culminated in his dismissal. Wakeman's classical training and fluency with electronic textures—including the Mellotron and Moog synthesizer—fundamentally expanded the band's sonic palette. To manage production time and high studio costs at Advision Studios, Yes split the album's concept: four tracks are collaborative, group-arranged pieces—including the landmark epics "Roundabout" and "Heart of the Sunrise"—while the remaining five serve as distinct solo pieces engineered to showcase the individual musical identity of each member. The packaging also inaugurated the band's celebrated, multi-decade collaboration with fantasy artist Roger Dean, who designed the album's fractured-world gatefold art.

Upon its release, Fragile received widespread critical acclaim and became a global commercial breakthrough, establishing the band's international market presence by peaking at number 4 on the US Billboard Top LPs chart and number 7 on the UK Albums Chart while reaching the top ten across Canada, the Netherlands, and Australia. To promote the album, an edited version of "Roundabout" was issued as a single in the United States, peaking at number 13 on the Billboard Hot 100 and driving mainstream radio exposure. The accompanying Fragile Tour spanned 115 dates across Europe and North America, serving as a critical turning point that elevated Yes to a major arena-headlining act while marking drummer Bill Bruford's final tour with the group prior to his 1972 departure. Retrospectively cited as a foundational pillar of the progressive rock genre, Fragile has sold over two million copies in the US to earn a double-platinum certification, alongside a Platinum certification from the British Phonographic Industry (BPI). The album's historical legacy has been preserved through numerous high-fidelity audiophile remasters, including a comprehensive six-disc Super Deluxe Edition box set in 2024.

== Background and recording ==
On 31 July 1971, Yes concluded their 1970–71 tour in support of The Yes Album (1971) with a final performance at Crystal Palace Park, London. The tour marked a significant milestone for the band, featuring their first performances in the US, which generated considerable momentum as both The Yes Album and its lead single, "Your Move", reached the US top 40. The line-up during this time comprised lead vocalist Jon Anderson, bassist Chris Squire, drummer Bill Bruford, keyboardist Tony Kaye, and guitarist Steve Howe. Following these dates, the band began developing their next studio project, which was initially envisioned as a double album blending studio and live recordings. However, this concept was abandoned due to the extensive time required for its production, and tentative plans to record in Miami, Florida with producer Tom Dowd similarly fell through.

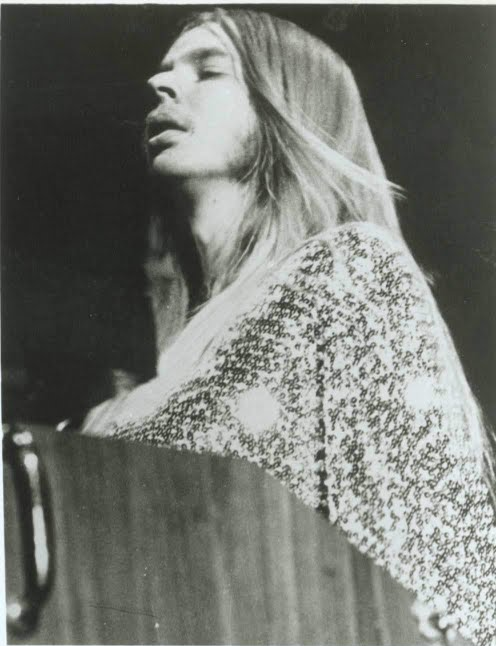
Fragile was the band's first album to feature keyboardist Rick Wakeman (pictured in 1973)

Rehearsals began in August 1971 at a small studio in Shepherd Market, London. As recording commenced, artistic disagreements arose within the group—particularly between Anderson, Squire, and Kaye. Kaye was reluctant to expand his sound beyond the Hammond organ and piano to play newer electronic instruments such as the Mellotron or Moog synthesiser. As a result, he was dismissed from the band; at the insistence of manager Brian Lane, Kaye surrendered his royalties from Yes's first three albums in exchange for a cash settlement of approximately $10,000. He was quickly replaced by Rick Wakeman, a classically trained pianist with extensive keyboard experience who was then a member of the folk rock band Strawbs and an active session musician. On the same day Yes approached him, Wakeman was also offered a spot in David Bowie's touring band; he ultimately chose Yes for the greater artistic freedom the group promised. Though he initially balked at the news that the band was immediately returning to the United States for another tour, he accepted the offer after recognising its potential. Despite early apprehensions regarding the frequency of the band's internal arguments—which led him to briefly fear an imminent split—Wakeman integrated quickly, recalling that the foundational arrangements for "Roundabout" and "Heart of the Sunrise" were mapped out by the end of his first day. Reflecting on this initial session, Squire noted, "That marked the first real appearance of the Mellotron and Moog synthesiser on that—adding the flavour of those instruments to a piece we'd basically already worked out".

Recording took place in August and September 1971 at Advision Studios, where the band utilised a 16-track tape machine. Eddy Offord, who had previously engineered Time and a Word (1970), returned to share production duties with the group. Production costs for the sessions totalled approximately $30,000, according to a report by Rolling Stone. Disputes exist regarding the origin of the album's title; lighting director Michael Tait recalled that Lane conceived it during a telephone call with a journalist while examining photographs of the Crystal Palace concert, noting that the band's stage monitors had "Fragile" stamped on the back. Conversely, Bruford claimed he suggested the title himself, reflecting his belief that the band was structurally "breakable" at the time. Wakeman also recalled an unusual atmosphere during the sessions, noting that children were occasionally brought into the studio to watch the band track material.

== Composition and music ==
Fragile comprises nine tracks, a structure split between four group-arranged compositions and five solo pieces conceptualised, arranged, and directed by each individual band member. (Note: Atlantic K 50009) Squire explained that this unconventional approach was adopted largely to mitigate high studio costs and save production time, noting that the group had financial pressures and that Wakeman required an extensive amount of costly new equipment upon joining. Bruford recalled initiating the concept during band discussions regarding how best to utilise their collective talents, proposing that they each use the group to anchor their individual musical visions. While some contemporary music critics dismissed the solo tracks as self-indulgent, Wakeman defended the album's structural layout, stating that it was a deliberate strategy to introduce a growing audience to each member's distinct musical identity and technical contribution.

=== Side one ===
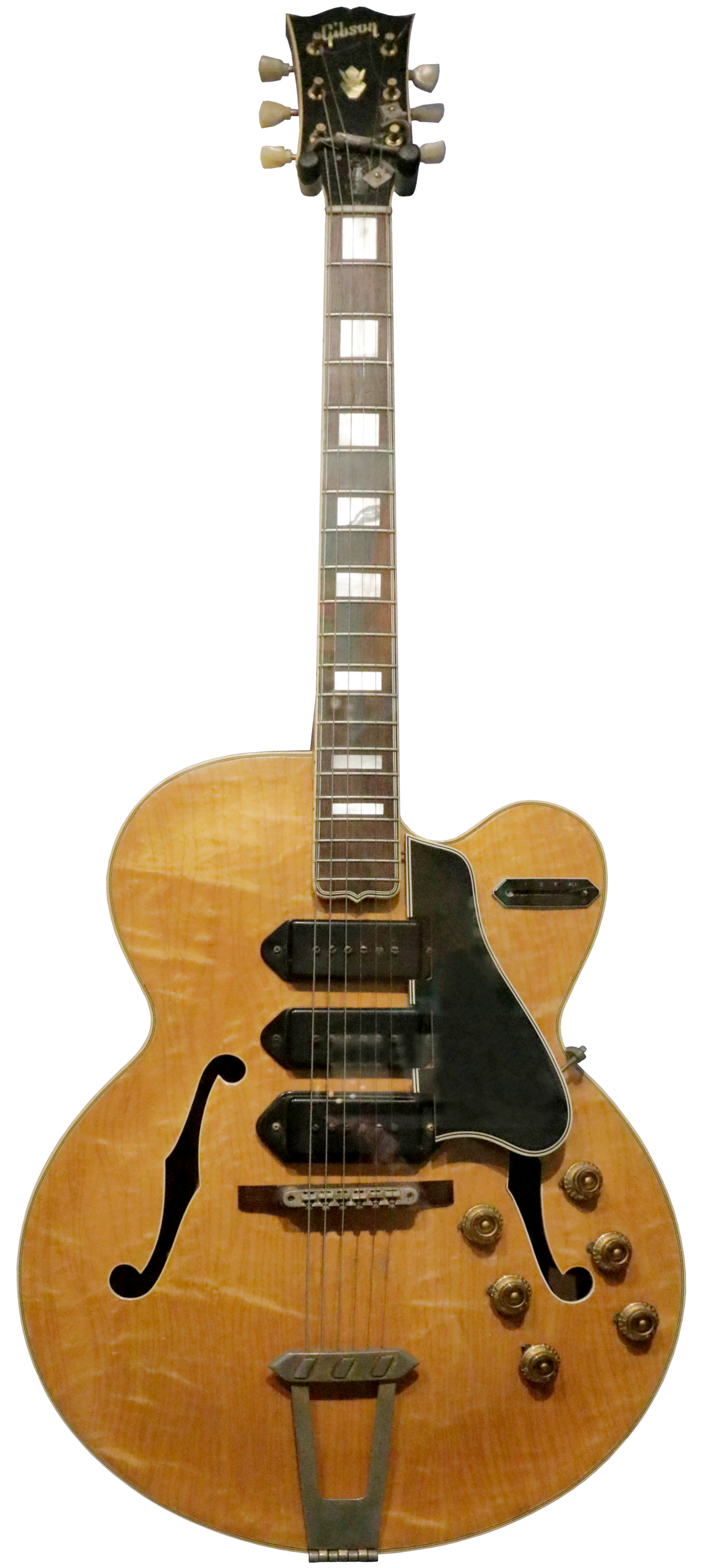
A 1956 Gibson ES-5 Switchmaster. Howe used a custom version of this model as his primary electric guitar throughout the *Fragile* recording sessions.

Co-written by Anderson and Howe, "Roundabout" became one of Yes's best-known songs. The track's lyrical and musical concepts originated in March 1971 while the band was traveling in a transit van from Aberdeen to Glasgow during The Yes Album Tour. The imagery of the Scottish countryside, along with the numerous circular traffic intersections they encountered, inspired Anderson's lyrics, including the line "In and around the lake" which referenced a nearby loch. Howe recalled that the piece was initially structured as a guitar instrumental suite, noting that he often composed the structural frameworks, melodies, and basic lines of a piece before a traditional arrangement was finalised. In the studio, the distinct opening note was created by playing a recorded piano chord backwards, and Howe tracked his classical acoustic guitar parts in the studio corridor because the main tracking room made the instrument sound "too dead". Due to the composition's unpredictable structure and shifting keys, Wakeman utilised his classical orchestration background to arrange and glue the different musical ideas together. He recorded his Hammond organ solo in a single take, later crediting Bruford for advising him to hold back during rehearsals but to play aggressively once tracking officially commenced.

"Cans and Brahms" is an electronic adaptation of an excerpt from the third movement of Johannes Brahms's Symphony No. 4 in E minor, and served as Wakeman's solo contribution. The piece features distinct electronic overdubs mimicking orchestral sections: electric piano for strings, grand piano for woodwinds, organ for brass, electric harpsichord for reeds, and a synthesizer simulating a contrabassoon. Wakeman estimated that the track required 15 hours to record in the studio. The title was coined by Bruford as a play on words, referencing the slang term "cans" for the studio headphones Wakeman wore while multi-tracking each instrumental layer. Wakeman later dismissed the arrangement as "dreadful", explaining that strict legal constraints imposed by A&M Records—to whom he was signed as a solo artist—prevented him from writing an original composition. He had originally intended to contribute "Catherine of Aragon", a track he ultimately held over for his solo album, The Six Wives of Henry VIII (1973).

Anderson's solo contribution, "We Have Heaven", was described by the vocalist as a "rolling idea of voices and things". The brief track is built on an intensive multi-track vocal overdub technique, featuring Anderson singing all the vocal parts to create a layered choral effect over his acoustic guitar accompaniment. The arrangement revolves around two primary sets of chants featuring the lyrics "Tell the Moon dog, tell the March hare" and "He is here, to look around". The track concludes with the sound effects of a slamming door and running footsteps, a production choice designed to segue directly into the wind effects that introduce the following track.

"South Side of the Sky" is a group-arranged composition featuring a heavy rock riff driven by Squire and Bruford, contrasted by a classical-influenced piano and vocal interlude in its mid-section. Howe's main guitar riff was adapted from "Tired Towers", a track by his previous band, Bodast. Lyrically, the song recounts a tragic expedition where a team of mountain climbers freezes to death, a narrative framed by the addition of howling wind sound effects at the track's beginning and end. Wakeman contributed an extensive piano solo to the piece. However, as with his contributions to "Roundabout" and "Heart of the Sunrise", he did not receive an official songwriting credit due to contractual conflicts between his solo agreement with A&M Records and the band's contract with Atlantic Records. Although Atlantic executives promised him financial compensation for these contributions, Wakeman later noted that he never received the funds. He chose not to pursue legal action because of his enthusiasm for joining the band's creative environment. Yes did not perform the song live in its entirety until 2002.

=== Side two ===
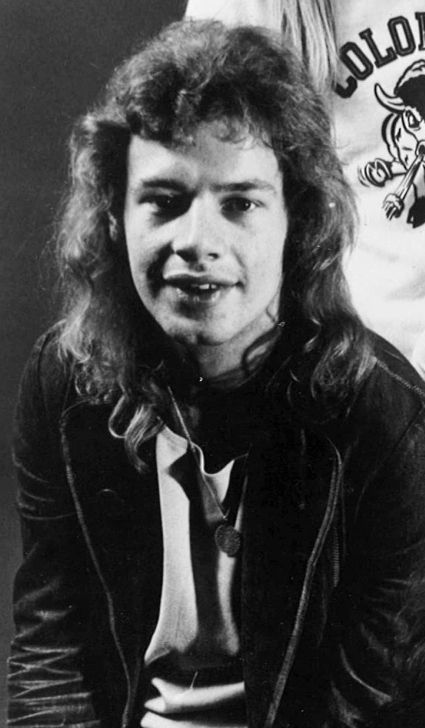
Bill Bruford, who wrote "Five Per Cent for Nothing" as his first attempt at musical composition.

Serving as the opening track of the original LP's second side, "Five per Cent for Nothing" is an instrumental composed by Bruford. Clocking in at thirty-five seconds, it is the shortest track in the band's catalogue and was described by Bruford as his first attempt at composition. The album's liner notes define the piece as a 16-bar tune derived directly from a percussion line and played through twice by the ensemble. Lighting director Michael Tait noted that the piece was originally titled "Suddenly It's Wednesday" before being renamed as a satirical reference to Yes paying five per cent of their future royalties to settle a contract dispute with their former manager, Roy Flynn. Yes performed the track live in 2014 and 2016 on tours that featured Fragile performed in its entirety. The complex, highly syncopated arrangement required precise collective execution; Howe recalled that to successfully end together during rehearsals, he had to track the beat count visually by dropping his guitar's headstock as a cue to the band. Even with that, it took considerable practice for all musicians to end on the same beat.

"Long Distance Runaround" was written by Anderson, and features lyrics addressing what the vocalist described as "the craziness of religion" and the "stupid doctrine" that Christianity is the exclusive path to spiritual truth. The second verse was specifically inspired by the 1970 Kent State shootings and the United States government's contemporaneous crackdown on anti-Vietnam War student protests. Musically, the track features a complex, interlocking riff between Howe's guitar and Wakeman's electric piano. Though originally released as the B-side to the "Roundabout" single, the song became a surprise hit in its own right and a staple of album-oriented rock radio. The track concludes with an Echoplex delay guitar run from Howe that segues directly into the next track.

Squire's solo showcase, "The Fish (Schindleria Praematurus)", has multiple overdubbed bass guitar lines that provide both rhythmic and melodic hooks. The title incorporates Squire's nickname, "Fish"—coined by Bruford due to Squire's habit of taking long baths. The track's subtitle originated when Anderson requested a word or phrase with exactly eight syllables to fit the song's closing vocal chant; lighting director Michael Tait discovered the name of the marine species Schindleria praematurus while searching through a copy of the Guinness Book of Records.

"Mood for a Day" serves as Howe's solo track and marks his second unaccompanied acoustic guitar piece on a Yes album, following "Clap" on The Yes Album (1971). Recorded using a Conde flamenco guitar, the composition blends classical and flamenco styling elements. Howe named guitarists Sabicas and Carlos Montoya as major influences on the piece. He later expressed dissatisfaction with the studio recording, noting that he came to consider the album version technically inferior to his subsequent live performances.

"Heart of the Sunrise" originated as a love song Anderson wrote for his then-wife, Jennifer. Lyrically, the song contrasts the beauty of the natural world with the "excitement and friction" of London's streets, framing the perspective of an individual feeling lost within an urban environment. The piece developed from an ascending bass riff by Squire that Howe compared to King Crimson's "21st Century Schizoid Man", which became the central theme of the song. The track heavily incorporates Wakeman's classical training; he introduced the group to the structural concept of recapitulation, where previously established musical themes are dynamically revisited later in a piece. Bruford regarded the track as the group's definitive breakthrough in originality, praising its combination of dramatic poise, pastoral English lyrics, and delicate vocals. Howe initially attempted to record his parts using a Gibson ES-5 Switchmaster, but swapped it for his standard Gibson ES-175 after finding the former's tone unsatisfactory for the arrangement. Following a brief period of silence at the conclusion of the song, the sound effect of a door opening introduces a short reprise of "We Have Heaven", serving as a hidden track to close the album.

== Artwork ==
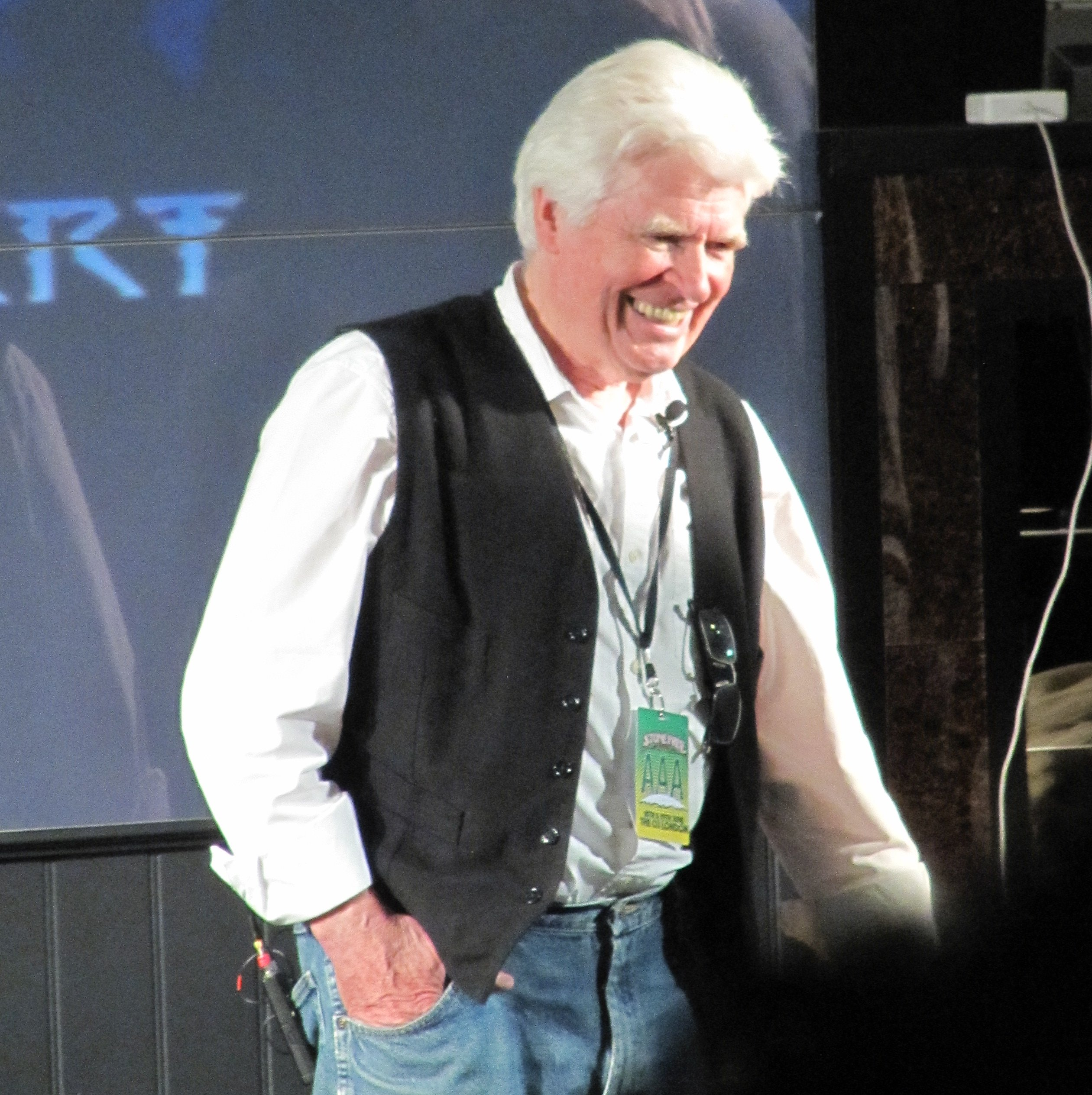
English artist Roger Dean, whose surreal landscapes became synonymous with the band's visual identity starting with Fragile

Fragile marked the beginning of the band's long-standing collaboration with English artist Roger Dean, who went on to design many of their subsequent album covers and, in the following year, their iconic "bubble" logo. Earlier in 1971, Dean had submitted his portfolio to Phil Carson, the European General Manager of Atlantic Records, who promised to contact him whenever one of his artists required cover art; Yes became the first opportunity.

Prior to developing the cover, Dean had conceived a creation myth about a young child who dreams of living on a disintegrating world, forcing its inhabitants to construct a sailing "space ark" to find a new home while towing the fragments behind them. Recognizing that the album's title mirrored the internal "psyche" and precarious stability of the band at the time, Dean adopted a literal interpretation for his design, depicting a delicate, bonsai-like planet on the verge of breaking apart as a large, glider-like wooden spacecraft escapes into deep space. While the band originally requested an image of fractured porcelain, Dean compromised by splitting the planet into two large pieces. Bruford later praised the artwork, noting that Dean had brilliantly elevated the band's title concept into a prescient statement on the Earth's delicate, breakable ecosystem. Dean produced three variant versions of the painting—nominally titled red, green, and blue—to achieve his intended color balance. He later continued this specific narrative arc across the four individual panels of the 1973 triple live album Yessongs, charting the spacecraft's flight and the landing of the planetary fragments, though his evolving style meant the landscapes diverged visually from the original album.

The original LP packaging featured an accompanying promotional booklet containing two additional paintings by Dean: the front cover depicted five creatures huddled beneath an exposed root system, while the back illustrated a figure scaling a sheer rock formation. The interior of the booklet dedicated individual pages to each band member, featuring personal photographs alongside smaller illustrations of their wives and children. Anderson's section included a short poem, while Wakeman's page featured an eclectic list of personal acknowledgments that included Mozart, The White Bear public house in Hounslow, and Brentford F.C.

== Release ==
Fragile was released in the United Kingdom on 12 November 1971. The album had originally been scheduled for release a month earlier; however, the United States division of Atlantic Records delayed its distribution out of concern that early copies would be bootlegged and imported into the American market. Furthermore, because The Yes Album and its lead single, "Your Move", were actively gaining momentum on the US charts, Atlantic executives resisted issuing new material too quickly. Despite the delay, an estimated 10,000 import copies of Fragile had made their way to the US by December 1971.

The album received its official US release on 4 January 1972. (Note: Atlantic SD 7211) It became a major international commercial success, peaking at number 4 on the US Billboard Top LPs chart and number 7 on the Official Albums Chart in the UK. Bruford recalled realising the band had achieved significant commercial success—nearly four years after their formation—when he saw Fragile in the Billboard top five while riding in a limousine in the US. He compared the experience to successfully pulling off a bank heist, noting that the journey to that point was more rewarding than "running away with the riches." The record established the band's global market presence, reaching the top ten on the charts in Australia, Canada, and the Netherlands. In March 1972, the album received a Gold certification from the Recording Industry Association of America (RIAA), and was certified double Platinum in 1998 for sales exceeding two million copies in the US. In the UK, the album was certified Platinum by the British Phonographic Industry (BPI) for reaching the 300,000 sales threshold.

To promote the record in the US, "Roundabout" was issued as a single with "Long Distance Runaround" serving as the single's B-side on the same day as the album's release; conversely, the single was withheld from a commercial release in the UK. Atlantic's US radio department trimmed the track's duration to a radio-friendly 3:27 without the band's prior knowledge, and Anderson and Howe were initially shocked by the extensive structural edits. Despite the band's initial objections, Anderson later acknowledged that the edit substantially boosted Yes's mainstream exposure and increased concert attendance. The single peaked at number 13 on the Billboard Pop Singles chart in April 1972.

== Critical reception ==
Professional ratings
Review scores
Source	Rating
AllMusic	5/5 stars
Christgau's Record Guide	B
The Daily Vault	A−
Pitchfork	8.8/10
Rolling Stone (1972)	Favourable
Rolling Stone (2003)	4/5 stars
The Rolling Stone Album Guide	4/5 stars
The Village Voice	B

Fragile received a generally positive reception from contemporary music critics, who frequently highlighted the band's technical proficiency and ambitious arrangements. Billboard magazine featured the record in its "Billboard Pick" column, characterizing it as "vibrant, soothing, tumultuous, placid and instrumentally brilliant" while praising Anderson's "deliciously ingratiating" vocals. Writing for Rolling Stone, Richard Cromelin lauded the album's "gorgeous melodies, intelligent, carefully crafted, constantly surprising arrangements, concise and energetic performances" and "cryptic but evocative lyrics". However, Cromelin balanced his praise by noting that the band occasionally succumbed to a "show-off syndrome," arguing that tracks like "We Have Heaven" at times seemed designed merely to impress.

In the United Kingdom, Andrew Tyler of Disc and Music Echo offered high praise for the group's updated direction, noting that the inclusion of Wakeman's multi-keyboard arrangements gave the band an added layer of poise and symphonic depth that separated them from standard rock contemporaries. Ed Kelleher of Circus magazine also provided highly favourable praise, concluding that the record was "unquestionably their most cohesive and mettlesome undertaking." Prominent American critic Robert Christgau awarded the album a "B" grade in his column for The Village Voice; while noting that the music contained elements of contrivance, he stated a clear preference for Yes's "rock-classical synthesis" over their progressive peers, praising how the tricky introductions and intense musical textures were successfully integrated into a self-sustaining electric framework. In contrast, Melody Maker delivered a more mixed British assessment, suggesting that the album's solo-heavy structure risked functioning as a sequence of clever technical exercises rather than a singular thematic narrative. Nevertheless, the review strongly praised "Roundabout," highlighting Howe's complex guitar work and favorably comparing its musical style to "Yours Is No Disgrace" from The Yes Album.

Modern retrospective evaluations view Fragile as a foundational pillar of the progressive rock genre. In his review for AllMusic, Bruce Eder awarded the album a full five stars, noting that it propelled Yes from a cult act to an international phenomenon. Eder emphasised that the record marked the exact juncture where the band's fantasy themes, virtuoso packaging, and musical signatures coalesced into a fully formed identity, noting that Roger Dean's cover design drew consumer attention in a manner unseen since the peak of the psychedelic era. Music critic and author Jim DeRogatis recognised its enduring cultural footprint, calling it "the prog album most celebrated by FM-rock radio." The album's legacy has been cemented across several reference and industry publications; it was included in the musical compendium 1001 Albums You Must Hear Before You Die, and in 2014, a readers' poll in Rhythm ranked it the sixth-greatest progressive rock drumming album of all time.

== Tour ==
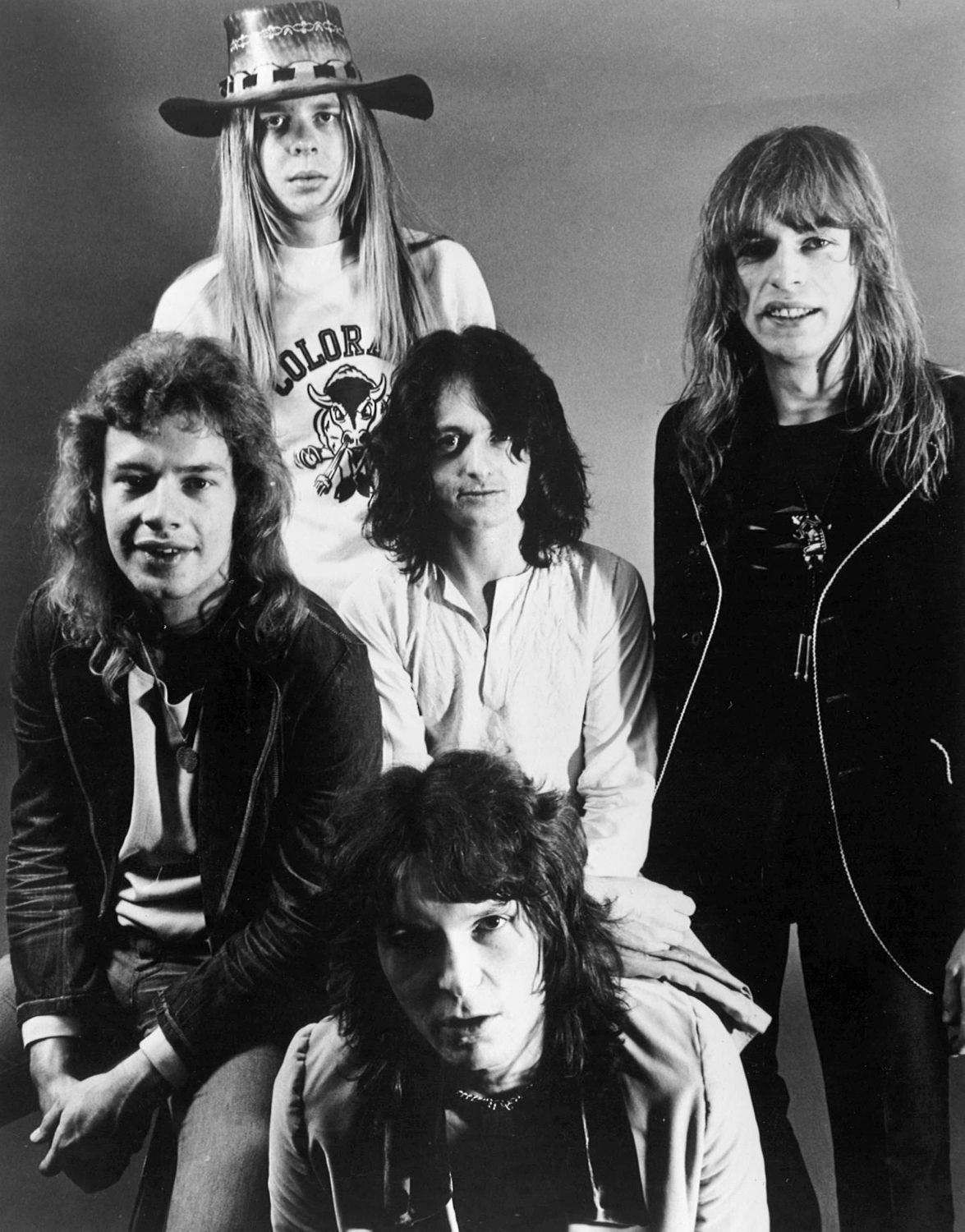
The Fragile line-up posing for a 1972 promotional photo. Standing: Rick Wakeman and Steve Howe; Seated: Bill Bruford and Jon Anderson; Floor: Chris Squire.

The Fragile Tour lasted from 24 September 1971 until 27 March 1972, encompassing 115 dates across Europe and North America. The trek commenced at the Queen's Hall in Barnstaple, Devon, and concluded at the Aquarius Theatre in Boston, Massachusetts. Bolstered by the heavy rotation of "Roundabout" on American FM radio, the tour proved to be a critical turning point that elevated Yes from a support or mid-tier act into a major arena-headlining attraction across North America. Performances recorded during the February 1972 dates at New York City's Academy of Music were later featured on the live album Yessongs (1973). The outing also served as Bruford's final tour with the group prior to his departure in July 1972; he would not tour with Yes again until the Union Tour in 1991.

== Reissues ==
Fragile was first reissued on CD across the United States and Europe in 1990. (Note: Atlantic SD 191322; 050 009) A remastered edition on CD and cassette, prepared by Joe Gastwirt, followed in 1994; this edition included a reprise of "We Have Heaven" positioned after "Heart of the Sunrise", bringing the collective final track running time to 11:32. (Note: Atlantic 826672; 826674) In 2002, Rhino and Elektra Records issued the album in stereo and 5.1 surround sound mixes on the DVD-Audio format, adding the band's studio cover of "America" alongside supplemental multimedia features. (Note: Elektra 78249) The following year, the labels distributed a newly remastered CD prepared by Dan Hersch, which appended "America" and an early rough mix of "Roundabout" as bonus tracks. (Note: Elektra 8122737892) This 2003 master was later compiled into the box set The Studio Albums, 1969–1987, released in 2013.

The album was subjected to multiple high-fidelity audiophile restorations in 2006. Mobile Fidelity Sound Lab released a "24 KT Gold" CD edition mastered by Shawn Britton, (Note: MFSL UDCD 766) while Analogue Productions pressed a 200-gram vinyl LP mastered by Kevin Gray and Steve Hoffman. (Note: Analogue Productions APP7211) In 2011, Warner Japan issued a hybrid stereo/multi-channel Super Audio CD version as part of their Warner Premium Sound series. (Note: Warner WPCR 14167) On 30 October 2015, a definitive package featuring new stereo and 5.1 surround sound mixes mixed by Steven Wilson was released on CD, DVD-Audio, and Blu-ray, with the Blu-ray disc archiving six previously unreleased bonus takes.

Rhino celebrated the album's legacy on 28 June 2024 with the release of a comprehensive six-disc Super Deluxe Edition box set. The collection comprised four CDs, a Blu-ray disc, and a vinyl LP, showcasing a newly remastered stereo version of the original album alongside new 2024 stereo, instrumental, 5.1 surround sound, and Dolby Atmos configurations mixed by Wilson. The box set also archived two full discs of rarities, outtakes, and historical live material, highlighted by the band's unreleased 19 February 1972 concert at New York City's Academy of Music. Following the release of the expansive box sets, high-fidelity standalone Blu-ray Pure Audio editions were introduced to accommodate the spatial mixes as a single-disc configuration.

== Track listing ==
Details are taken from the 1971 US Atlantic album (UK release does not list running times); other releases may show different information.

Side one
No.	Title	Writer(s)	Length
1.	"Roundabout"	Jon Anderson, Steve Howe	8:29
2.	"Cans and Brahms" (instrumental)	Johannes Brahms, arranged by Rick Wakeman	1:34
3.	"We Have Heaven"	Anderson	1:38
4.	"South Side of the Sky"	Anderson, Chris Squire	7:57
Total length:			19:38

Side two
No.	Title	Writer(s)	Length
1.	"Five per Cent for Nothing" (instrumental (Note: On some cassette releases, this was the last track on side one))	Bill Bruford	0:35
2.	"Long Distance Runaround"	Anderson	3:28
3.	"The Fish (Schindleria Praematurus)"	Squire	2:36
4.	"Mood for a Day" (instrumental)	Howe	2:55
5.	"Heart of the Sunrise" (includes hidden track (Note: The hidden track, a reprise of "We Have Heaven", is not listed on the album's sleeve. Original pressings list the duration of "Heart of the Sunrise" as 10:34, thereby omitting the timing of the reprise.))	Anderson, Squire, Bruford	11:16
Total length:			20:50

2003 CD additional tracks
No.	Title	Writer(s)	Length
10.	"America"	Paul Simon	10:33
11.	"Roundabout" (Early rough mix)		8:35
Total length:			1:00:30 (60:30)

== Personnel ==
Credits are adapted from the album's liner notes.

Yes

- Jon Anderson – lead vocals
- Steve Howe – electric and acoustic guitars, backing vocals
- Chris Squire – bass guitar, backing vocals
- Rick Wakeman – Hammond organ, grand piano, RMI 368 Electra-Piano and Harpsichord, Mellotron, Minimoog synthesizers
- Bill Bruford – drums, percussion

Production

- Yes – production
- Eddy Offord – engineering, production
- Gary Martin – assistant engineering
- Roger Dean – sleeve drawings, paintings, design, photography
- David Wright – colour photograph of Bill Bruford on drums
- Brian Lane – bank loan arrangement

Notes

- Rick Wakeman appears courtesy of A&M Records

== Charts ==
=== Weekly charts ===
Chart (1971–72)	Peak position
Australian Albums (Kent Music Report)	29
Canada Top Albums/CDs (RPM)	6
Dutch Albums (Album Top 100)	8
Japanese Albums (Oricon)	22
UK Albums (Official Charts)	7
US Billboard 200	4

Chart (2015–24)	Peak position
Hungarian Physical Albums (MAHASZ)	12
UK Independent Albums (Official Charts)	17
UK Rock & Metal Albums (Official Charts)	7
UK Progressive Albums (Official Charts)	8

=== Year-end charts ===
Chart (1971)	Position
Dutch Albums (Album Top 100)	63

== Certifications ==
Region	Certification	Certified units/sales
Canada (Music Canada)	Platinum	100,000^{^}
United Kingdom (BPI)	Platinum	300,000^{^}
United States (RIAA)	2× Platinum	2,000,000^{^}
^{^} Shipments figures based on certification alone.

== Sources ==
- Bruford, Bill (2009). Bill Bruford: The Autobiography: Yes, King Crimson, Earthworks, and More. Jawbone Publishing. ISBN 9781906002237.
- Hedges, Dan (1982). Yes: An Authorized Biography. Sidgwick & Jackson. ISBN 978-0-283-98751-9.
- Howe, Steve (2021). All My Yesterdays. Omnibus Press. ISBN 9781785581793.
- Morse, Tim (1996). Yesstories: "Yes" in Their Own Words. St Martin's Press. ISBN 978-0-312-14453-1.
- Popoff, Martin (2016). Time and a Word: The Yes Story. Soundcheck Books. ISBN 978-0-993-21202-4.
- Welch, Chris (2008). Close to the Edge – The Story of Yes. Omnibus Press. ISBN 978-1-84772-132-7.
- Wooding, Dan (1978). Rick Wakeman: The Caped Crusader. Granada Publishing Limited. ISBN 978-0-709-16487-6.
- Various band members (27 March 2006). 9012Live (DVD). Warner Music Group. UPC 5051011186523.
