= Vince Taylor =

English rock and roll singer (1939–1991)

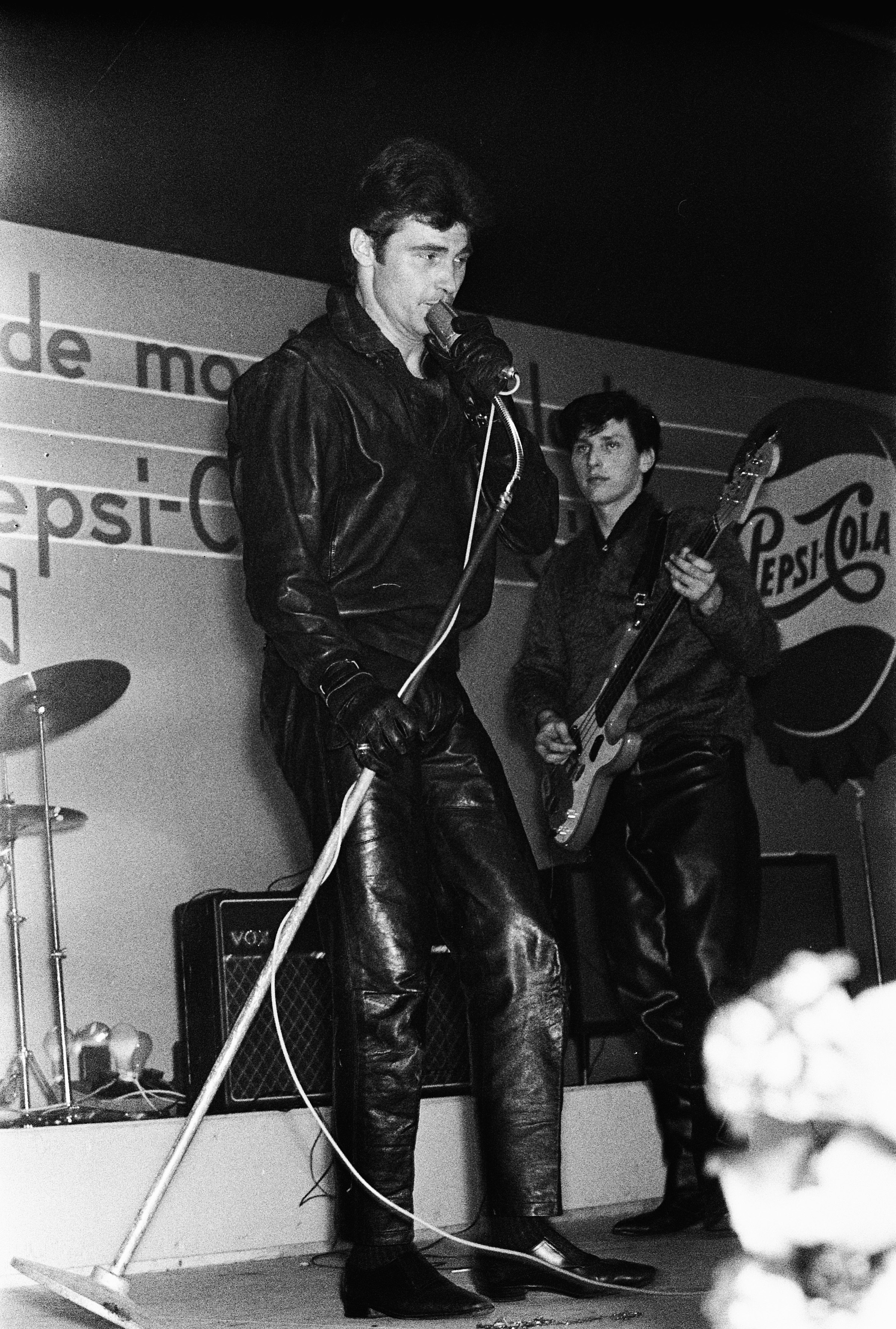
- Vince Taylor and the Playboys (1963)

Background information
- Born: Brian Maurice Holden; 14 July 1939; Isleworth, Middlesex, England
- Died: 28 August 1991 (aged 52); Lutry, Switzerland
- Genres: Rock and roll, rockabilly
- Occupations: Singer, songwriter
- Years active: 1957–1991

Vince Taylor (born Brian Maurice Holden; 14 July 1939 – 28 August 1991), was a British rock and roll singer and songwriter. As the lead singer of Vince Taylor and His Playboys, sometimes called Vince Taylor and the Playboys, he was successful primarily in France and other parts of continental Europe during the late 1950s and early 1960s, afterwards falling into obscurity amidst personal problems and drug abuse. He is best remembered for his 1959 song "Brand New Cadillac", which the Clash covered on their album London Calling. He was the inspiration for David Bowie's Ziggy Stardust character, according to Bowie.

== Biography ==
=== Early life ===
Taylor spent his early life in Isleworth, Middlesex. When he was seven, the Holdens emigrated to America and settled in New Jersey where his father found employment. The family moved to California, where Taylor attended Hollywood High School. As a teenager, Taylor took flying lessons and obtained a pilot's licence. In 1966, his sister Sheila married Joe Barbera, of Hanna-Barbera.

=== Music career ===
At age 18, impressed by the music of Gene Vincent and Elvis Presley, Taylor began to sing, mostly at amateur gigs. In the summer of 1958, Taylor was in London and went to The 2i's Coffee Bar on Old Compton Street in Soho, where Tommy Steele was playing. There he met drummer Tony Meehan (later of the Shadows) and bass player Tex Makins (born Anthony Paul Makins, 3 July 1940, Wembley, Middlesex). They formed a band called the Playboys. Whilst looking at a packet of Pall Mall cigarettes he noticed the Latin phrase, In hoc signo vinces. He decided on the new stage name of Vince Taylor.

His first single for Parlophone, "Right Behind You Baby" and "I Like Love", was released in 1958, followed several months later by "Pledgin' My Love" backed with "Brand New Cadillac" (the latter track featuring guitarist Joe Moretti, who later played on "Shakin' All Over" with Johnny Kidd & the Pirates). Parlophone was not satisfied with the immediate results and severed the recording contract. Taylor moved to Palette Records and recorded "I'll Be Your Hero", backed with "Jet Black Machine", which was released on 19 August 1960.

"Brand New Cadillac" is now recognized as a landmark in the development of British rock and roll. The song became a hit in continental Europe from chart-topping cover versions by the Renegades, Hep Stars and the Shamrocks in Finland, Sweden and France, respectively.

On 23 April 1960 ABC Weekend TV screened the first edition of their new weekly rock and roll TV show, Wham! The first show featured Taylor with Dickie Pride, Billy Fury, Joe Brown, Jess Conrad, Little Tony, and Johnny Kidd & the Pirates.

While Taylor was dynamic on stage, his unpredictable personality led to many arguments within the band, who parted company with him in 1961 and changed their name to the Bobbie Clarke Noise. Under that name they were contracted to play at the Olympia in Paris in July 1961. The top of the bill was Wee Willie Harris. Taylor had remained in contact with the band, and he asked if he could rejoin them in Paris. He dressed up for the sound check in his trademark black leather stage gear, and added a chain around his neck with a Joan of Arc medallion, which he had bought on arrival at Calais. One version of the story says Taylor gave such an extraordinary performance at the sound check that the organizers decided to put him at the top of the bill for both shows. As a result of his performance at those two shows, Eddie Barclay signed him to a six-year record deal on the Barclay label.

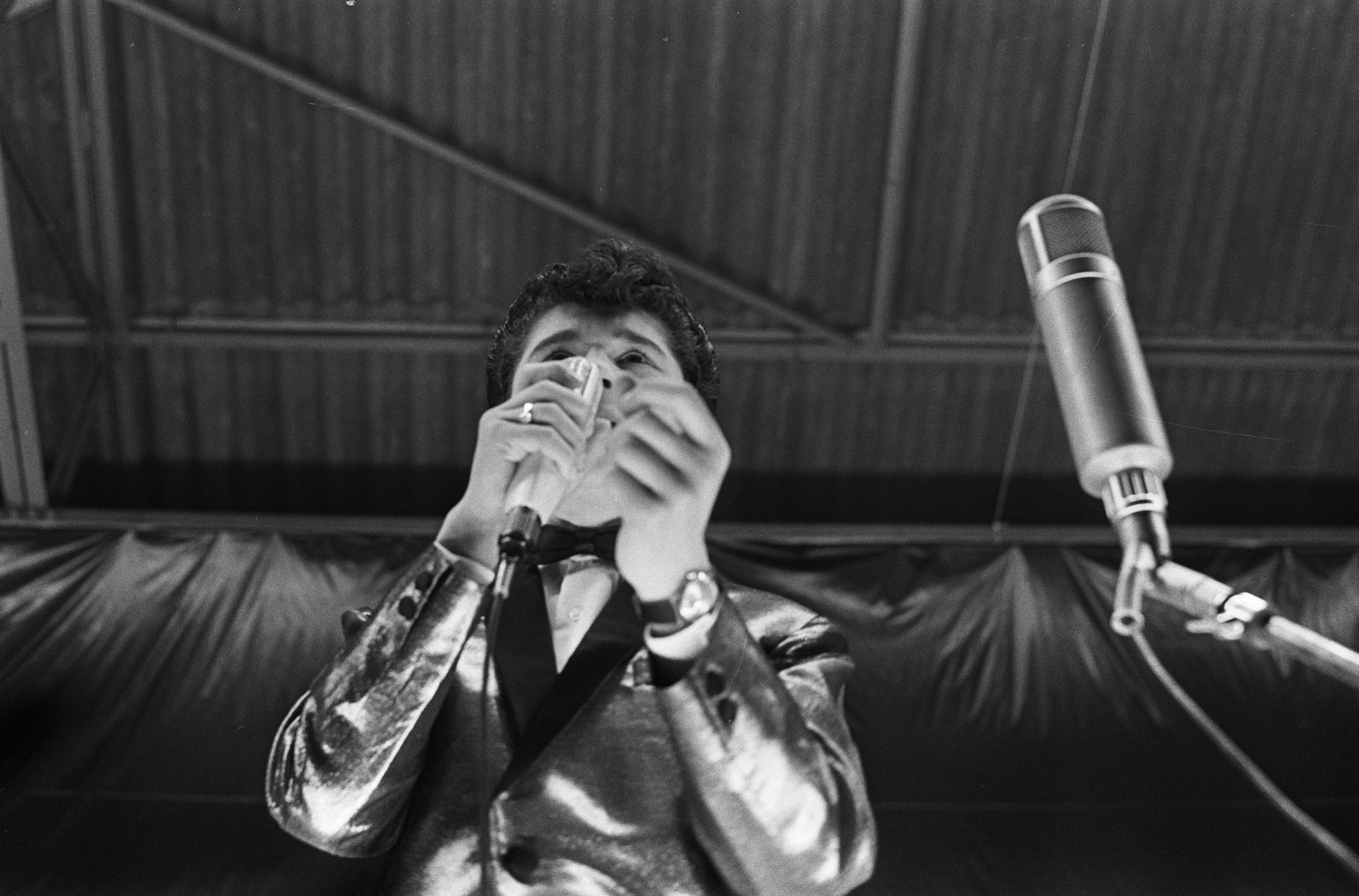
Vince Taylor (1963)

During 1961 and 1962, Taylor toured Europe with Clarke's band, once again called Vince Taylor and His Playboys. Between gigs they recorded several EPs and an album of 20 songs at Barclay Studios in Paris. These songs included the covers "Sweet Little Sixteen", "C'mon Everybody", "Twenty Flight Rock", "Love Me", "Long Tall Sally", "So Glad You're Mine" "Baby Let's Play House" and "Lovin' Up A Storm".

By the end of 1962, Vince Taylor and the Playboys were the top of the bill at the Olympia in Paris. Sylvie Vartan was the opening act.

Despite his on-stage rapport with the Playboys, the off-stage relationship faltered. As a result, the band once more broke up. Taylor played several engagements backed by the English band the Echoes (who also backed Gene Vincent whenever he played the UK), but he still presented the band as the Playboys.

In February 1964, a new single "Memphis Tennessee", backed with "A Shot of Rhythm and Blues", was released on the Barclay label. The new set of Playboys musicians were Joey Greco and Claude Djaoui on guitars, Ralph Di Pietro on bass, and Bobbie Clarke on drums. The group was under contract to the Johnny Hallyday orchestra. He appeared in four Scopitones: "Twenty Flight Rock", "Shakin' All Over", "Peppermint Twist" and "There's a Whole Lot of Twistin' Goin' On".

After Hallyday was required to do national service in the French Army, Clarke again joined Taylor, as the Bobbie Clarke Noise along with Ralph Danks (guitar), Alain Bugby of the Strangers (bass), Johnny Taylor, ex–lead singer for the Strangers (rhythm guitar), and "Stash de Rola" Prince Stanislas Klossowski de Rola (percussion). Managed by Jean Claude Camus, the band embarked on a triumphant tour of Spain and then co-topped the bill with the Rolling Stones during the Easter week-end of 1965 at the Olympia in Paris.

=== Decline ===
The band then disbanded and Taylor, having problems with alcohol and other drugs, joined a religious movement. Danks left to play guitar with Three Dog Night, and later Tom Jones, Elvis Presley and Bob Dylan. Stash, a close friend of the Rolling Stones, would later produce the Dirty Strangers album featuring Keith Richards and Ronnie Wood. Clarke replaced drummer Don Conka for several studio sessions with the original line up of the band Love. He also played with Vince Flaherty and his band the Invincibles, Frank Zappa, Jimi Hendrix, and the first incarnation of Deep Purple.

Meanwhile, Clarke was involved in a comeback for his friend Taylor, a one-month tour across France, billed as 'Vince Taylor and Bobbie Clarke backed by Les Rockers'. Eddie Barclay gave a new chance to Taylor who recorded again and performed intermittently throughout the 1970s and 1980s, until his death.

Taylor lived in Switzerland late in his life, where he worked as an aircraft mechanic. He said it was the happiest time of his life.

Taylor died from lung cancer in August 1991, at age 52. He was buried in Lausanne, Switzerland. He had lived in Switzerland since 1983 with his wife, Nathalie (née Minster), and his step-daughter, Magaly.

== Legacy ==
David Bowie said Taylor was the main inspiration for his character Ziggy Stardust.

The band Golden Earring referred to Taylor in their 1973 album Moontan, with the song "Just Like Vince Taylor", which was the US B-side for their hit "Radar Love".

In 1997, his character was played by the Clash singer Joe Strummer in F. J. Ossang's road movie Doctor Chance, as an ex–rock star turned private aviator.

Northern Irish singer Van Morrison mentions Taylor in his 1999 song "Goin' Down Geneva: "Vince Taylor used to live here/No one's even heard of him/Just who he was/Just where he fits in". Morrison would later interpolate "Brand New Cadillac" into his concert performances of "Going Down Geneva."

Taylor had a son, Ty Holden, who stated on BBC Radio 4 that Vince Taylor was an absent father. Ty was in the indie band Crown of Thorns, managed by Miles Copeland III. Ty Holden is now a DJ on the London underground dance scene.

On 18 August 2010 BBC Radio 4 broadcast the documentary Ziggy Stardust Came from Isleworth which, in the words of the producer, is a programme that "uncovers the truth about a singer whose wild lifestyle ultimately destroyed him, but in so doing he gave rise to a myth that transcended glam-rock and science fiction".

Adam Ant wrote and recorded "Vince Taylor" (co-written with Boz Boorer) for his 2013 album Adam Ant Is the Blueblack Hussar in Marrying the Gunner's Daughter. The song is partly a tribute to Taylor, and partly concerning a gold-plated chain given by Taylor to his French girlfriend Valerie who later passed it to Adam Ant (Ant has further claimed to having used the chain as a weapon, wrapped around his fist, in a confrontation with Sid Vicious.)

== See also ==
- British rock and roll

== Bibliography ==
- Vince Taylor Illustrated Discography, by Phil "Heron" Guidal, Black Leather, 1988
- Bodast: Spectral Nether Street, Cherry Red Records, CD-Inlay essay by Jon Newey, London, January 2000
- Besse, Josette and Jean-Loup Jouve. Vince Taylor, Johnny Kidd. Paris: Éditions Horus, 1979 ISBN 2-86387-026-2, 75p.
