= Curtiss Maldoon =

British folk music duo

Curtiss Maldoon was a folk music duo from England, formed by Dave Curtiss (born Dave Atkins) and Clive Maldoon (born Clive Skinner).

== Beginnings with Bodast ==
They first began working together in the band Bodast in 1968 which also featured Steve Howe (Yes, Asia, GTR) on guitar and Bobby Woodman Clarke on drums. They recorded one album produced by Keith West whom Howe had worked with in UK psychedelic band Tomorrow (known for their hit "My White Bicycle"), but it remained unreleased until it came out in truncated and remixed form in 1982 as The Lost Bodast Tapes.

A full re-issue featuring the original 1969 mixes came out under the title Spectral Nether Street on the RPM label in the 1990s.

Although not very active on the live circuit as they preferred to spend their time writing and rehearsing, Bodast played a show called the Pop Prom in 1968 where they were on the bill with The Who and acted as Chuck Berry's back-up band for the night.

== As Curtiss Maldoon ==
Curtiss Maldoon were on Purple Records, the label started by Deep Purple. Their connection to Deep Purple came out of Dave Curtiss short-lived involvement with an early incarnation of the band known as "Roundabout" where Curtiss was the vocalist (and Bobby Woodman Clarke was the drummer). No recordings have come to light of this line-up. Dave Curtiss (under the name "Dave Curtis and the Tremors") recorded several beat singles in the mid 1960s for various labels.

Their first LP featured Steve Howe on lead guitar, Tony Ashton, and musicians from Mighty Baby, including Roger Powell. This album features the song "Sepheryn," which Madonna and William Orbit transformed into the hit song "Ray of Light."

Curtiss Maldoon did some touring after the release of this album bolstered by a rhythm section. They played shows with Badfinger in the US and also did a well reviewed concert at Lincoln Center where they were on the bill with vocalist Merry Clayton.

Their second album came out under the name 'Maldoon' as Curtiss asked that his name be removed from the project, and that it be a Clive Maldoon solo album. It came out on the Purple label as well, this time distributed by Warner Brothers. After this album, Clive Maldoon continued trying to establish himself in the music world, but ran into a series of managerial and contract problems. He died in 1978 of complications from prescription medications.

== Discography ==
=== Albums ===
As Curtiss Maldoon

- Curtiss Maldoon (Oct 1971), Purple Records (also issued on Capitol in the US)

As Maldoon

- Maldoon (Nov 1973), Purple (also issued on Warner Bros. in the US)

=== Singles ===
- "You Make Me Happy" / "Amber Man" (July 1971), Regal Zonophone
