= Bobbie Clarke =

English rock drummer (1940–2014)

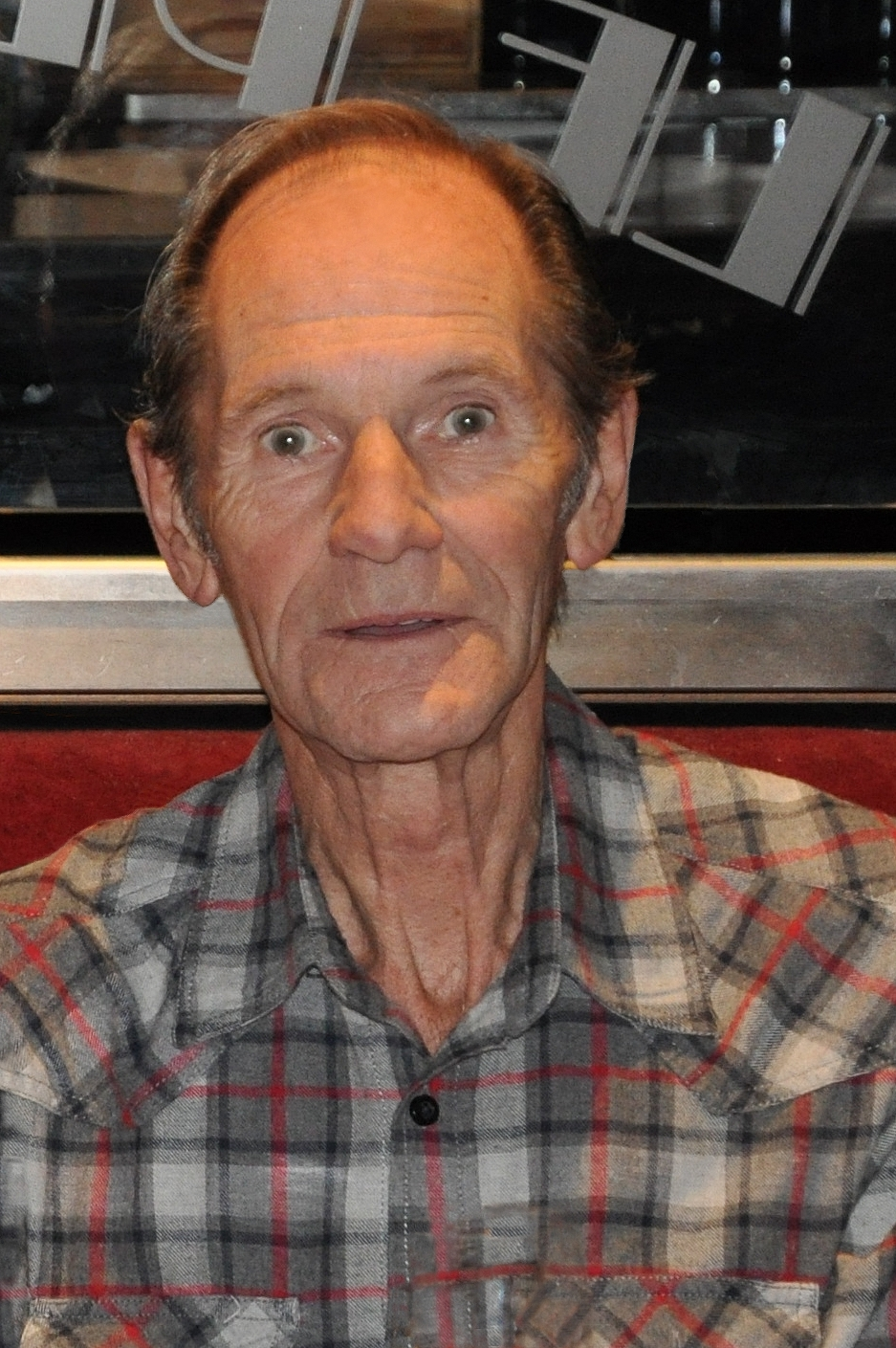
- Bobbie Clarke at Rock'n'roll jubilee, Paris 2010

Background information
- Born: Robert William Woodman; 13 June 1940; Coventry, England
- Died: 29 August 2014 (aged 74) Coventry, England
- Occupation: Drummer
- Years active: Late 1950s–2014

Bobbie Clarke (born Robert William Woodman, 13 June 1940 – 29 August 2014) was an English rock drummer. He was regarded by critics as an important figure in the configuration of early British rock and roll, although he is often chiefly remembered for his long term association as the drummer with Vince Taylor and the Playboys.

== Early career ==
Clarke originally learned to play as a teenager with Eric Delaney, a jazz artist popular in England in the 1950s. By 1958 Clarke shifted to the flourishing rhythm and blues, and rock scene, joining Vince Eager's Beat Boys, composed of Tony Belcher (guitar), Alan Le Claire (born Alan Cocks, 26 August 1938; piano), and Tex Makins (born Anthony Paul Makins, 3 July 1940; bass), who performed at a London coffee bar. Vince Eager was born Roy Taylor (4 June 1940, Lincoln, Lincolnshire) and was a former member of the Harmonica Vagabonds, the Vagabonds Skiffle Group, Vince Eager and the Quiet Three.

With guitarist Big Jim Sullivan (born James George Tomkins, 14 February 1941), the Beat Boys for a time became Marty Wilde's Wildcats, recording three tunes "High School Confidential", "Too Much" and "Mean Woman Blues". Subsequently, the same band again became the Beat Boys, backing up Billy Fury.

== Vince Taylor and the Playboys ==
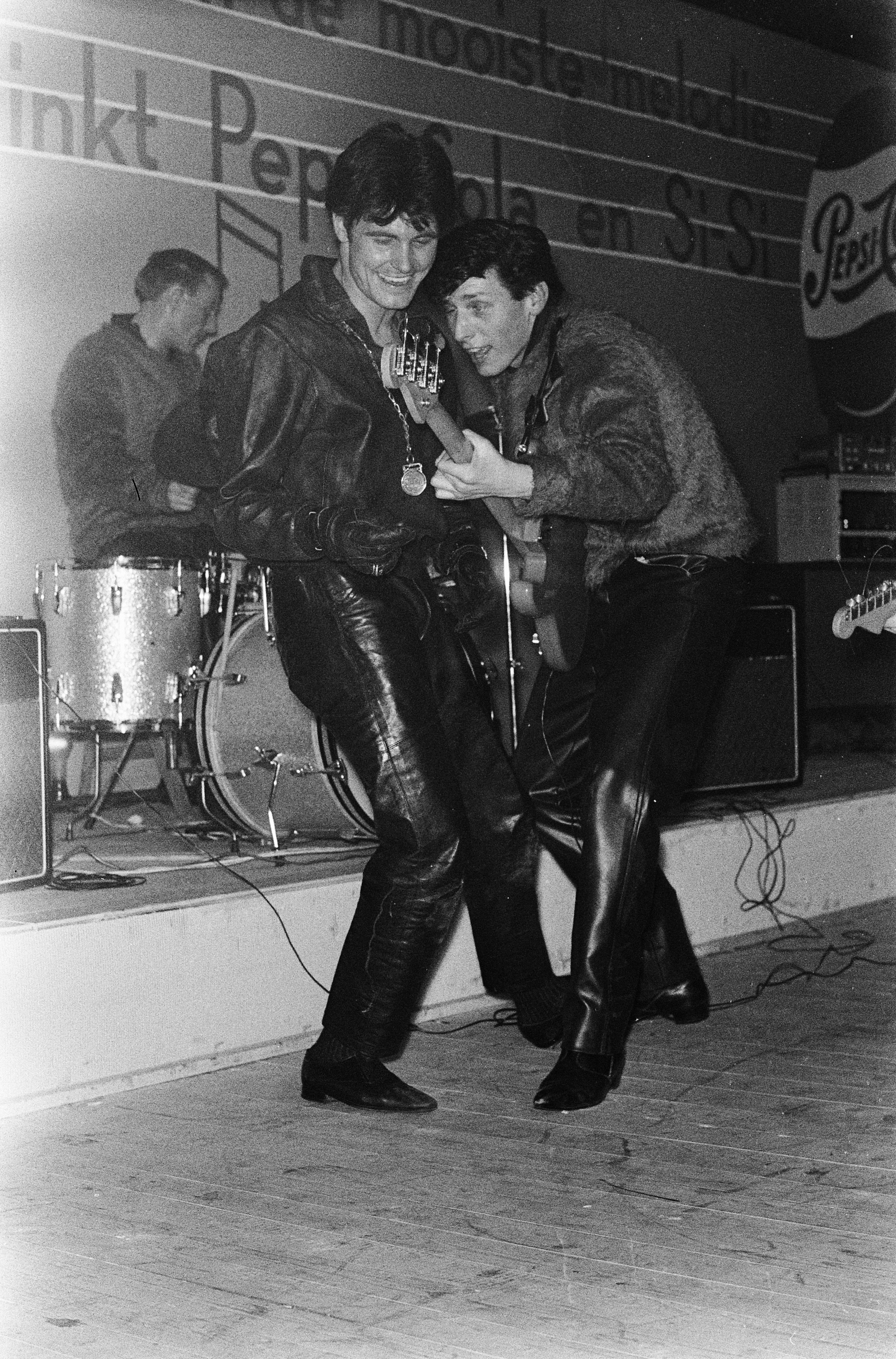
Bobbie Clarke (drums), Vince Taylor & unidentified bass player (Blokker, 1963)

In about December 1958 Bobbie met 19-year-old Vince Taylor who was brought to the UK from America by his brother in law, Joe Barbera, who co-founded Hanna-Barbera. In September 1960, Clarke and his band became Taylor's Playboys with Kenny Pavell (guitar), Clive Powell (piano), and Tex Makins (bass). Powell later became notable as Georgie Fame. When Kenny Pavel left the band to play for Cliff Richard's Drifters, he was replaced for a while by 16-year-old Jimmy Page, future guitarist of Led Zeppelin.

In 1958, their first records, "I Like Love" and "Right Behind You Baby" were released by Parlophone, with Tony Sheridan (Lead Guitar), Tony Harvey (Rhythm Guitar), Brian 'Liquorice' Locking (String Bass), Lou Brian (Piano) and Brian Bennett (Drums). In 1959 "Brand New Cadillac" was released. On 19 August 1960, Palette Records Ltd. released "I'll Be Your Hero" and the famous "Jet Black Machine" with Tony Harvey (Lead Guitar), Johnny Vance (Bass), Alan Le Claire (Piano) and Bobby Woodman (Drums). It stayed in the charts 9 weeks and reached the top 15. The single might have been a bigger hit, but UK teenagers of the time, under the influence of the media, were guided to listen to a more 'clean' sounding Cliff Richard and his band The Shadows.

== The Bobby Woodman Noise ==
The Noise with Bob Steele on guitar was booked to play at the Olympia in Paris on 7–8 July 1961. The top of the bill was Wee Willie Harris. The other artists were Dave Sampson, Vince Eager, and Nero and the Gladiators, which contained lead guitar player Tony Harvey. Despite their differences, Vince was still friends with the band and asked, considering that he had never been to France, if he could come to Paris with his friends and if necessary, sing for free.

== Reunion with Taylor ==
Vince dressed up for the occasion in his black leather gear and added a chain around his neck with a Joan of Arc medallion. He gave such an extraordinary performance at the sound check that even the band was amazed, and the organizers decided to put Vince Taylor and his Playboys at the top of the Bill for both shows. As a result of Vince's performance and his interaction with the band at those two shows Eddie Barclay signed the group to a six-year record deal on the Barclay label, with Bobbie Woodman changing his name to Bobbie Clarke.

For the next two years, Bobbie Clarke with his band, once again called Vince Taylor and his Play Boys (Vince Taylor et ses Play Boys) toured Europe including The French Riviera, Brussels, Belgium, Spain, and The Netherlands in between recording several LP albums and numerous 45 RPM singles, at Barclay Studios in Paris, such as "Sweet Little Sixteen", "C'mon Everybody", "Twenty Flight Rock", "Love Me", "Long Tall Sally", "So Glad You're Mine", "Baby Let's Play House", "Lovin Up A Storm" to name a few.

== Johnny Hallyday's Golden Stars ==
In February 1963 Bobbie Clarke left Vince and became the drummer for Johnny Hallyday's Golden Stars, resulting in three EPs released that year: in November Bob Steele was replaced by American Joey Greco on lead guitar. Bobbie Clarke and Joey Greco with the Golden Stars also recorded the single "Memphis Tennessee" with Vince Taylor, that was released by Barclay under the title of "Vince Taylor and The New Play Boys". Johnny Hallyday joined the French army in June 1964.

== Second reunion: Vince Taylor and the Bobbie Clarke Noise ==
In September 1964 the new Noise recorded the first "It's Not Unusual", a demo tape with Tom Jones. He re-formed The Noise, and with Vince Taylor played as the opening act for The Rolling Stones on their first three concerts in France, at the Olympia.

Barclay released a "fake live" LP under the name "Vince Taylor with Bobbie Clark's Noise", simply titled "Vince..!", a single from the album with "My Babe" b/w "Trouble" and a 4 track EP with "My Babe", "Long Tall Sally" "Trouble" and "My Baby Left Me", all tracks from the LP. The album was re-released in 1972 without the fake audience, titled "Vince Is Alive, Well And Living In Paris". The Noise at that time were: Ralph Danks(guitar), Johnny Taylor (guitar), Bobbie Clarke (drums), "Stash" Prince Stanislas Kosslowski de Rola (percussion), and Alan Bugby (bass) who had just finished playing with Ralph Danks in the Gladiators, and with Johnny Taylor's Strangers (three EPs on the Vega label in 1962 to 1963). In mid 1965, with several bookings lined up, Vince Taylor went away suddenly and the band finally gave up and Johnny Taylor joined a religious movement. Ralph Danks left to play guitar with Three Dog Night, and later Tom Jones, Elvis Presley and Bob Dylan. "Stash" Klossowski (a close friend of The Rolling Stones) would later produce The Dirty Strangers album featuring Keith Richards and Ronnie Wood.

== Career in the United States ==
In late 1965, Clarke, "Prince Stash", and Ralph Danks moved to Hollywood where Bobbie replaced drummer Don Conka on several studio sessions with the original members of the band Love, consisting of Don Conka (drums), Bryan MacLean (rhythm guitar), Johnny Echols (lead guitar) and Ken Forssi (bass), with the addition of Vince Flaherty (vocals, harmonica). At the same time the band was recording with Vince Flaherty, they were also playing at a club called Bido Lito's with their leader Arthur Lee, but had not yet obtained a record deal of their own. Two recordings, "The Groove" and "Why", included Clarke as drummer, Daryl Dragon ("The Captain", of The Captain and Tennille, on the organ), and Charles Wright (on the rhythm guitar). An EP from the sessions was later released on the Verve label entitled Vince and The Invincibles. In 1966 Bobbie Clarke also played with Frank Zappa, and cut a record with a band called The Elves Themselves, augmented by members from Love and Jimi Hendrix. His career in the U.S. was cut short when he was arrested for cannabis possession, becoming the first U.K. rock musician to be deported from the United States.

== Third reunion: Vince Taylor and the Bobbie Clarke Noise and Deep Purple ==
In 1967 Clarke returned to France and reformed "The Noise" with bass player Dave Curtis (ex lead singer of The Tremors), and guitarist Brian Griffiths, and once again gave it a go, with frontman Vince Taylor. In 1968 guitarist Ritchie Blackmore asked Clarke to join a new band called Roundabout (which later became known as Deep Purple). Bobbie brought with him Dave Curtis. Clarke and Curtis rehearsed in Deeves Hall for about 8 weeks with Jon Lord, Ritchie Blackmore and Nick Simper while singers were auditioned including Rod Evans who brought his Maze bandmate, drummer Ian Paice who was immediately auditioned (Clarke was out shopping) and selected. However, Deep Purple's managers, Tony Edwards and John Coletta backed Clarke to form a new band of their own with Steve Howe (later to join the band Yes) and singer/guitarist Clive Maldoon.

== Bodast ==
This new band, named Bodast (after the first two letters of their three first names), was an evolution from the first incarnation of Deep Purple, and the ashes of Keith West and Steve Howe's popular psychedelic band Tomorrow. They bridged the difficult period between the psychedelic pop of 1967 and the progressive/heavy rock of 1970. John Newey, for RPM, a division of Cherry Red Records, describes their music as: "…rich in past echoes of the Hollies, the Move and Tomorrow yet pointing the way ahead to the might of Queen and David Bowie."

Between May 1968 and mid 1969, Bodast produced an entire self-titled album for MGM Records. In February 1969, The Jeff Beck Group's drummer was fired and upon Beck's request Bobbie took his place, and did a few gigs at the Marquee in London, but was obligated to get back to work with Bodast, although Beck had expected him to stay with his group. Unfortunately for Bodast, their label MGM Records folded and the album was not released until 1981. The last gig for Bodast was in 1968 when they opened for The Who and were the backing band for Chuck Berry at the Royal Albert Hall. Thereafter, Clarke rejoined Johnny Hallyday in Paris.

== The Bobbie Clarke Connection ==
In 1971–72 he formed The Bobbie Clarke Connection, consisting of: Eddie Ayers (vocals), Jack Moriarty (lead guitar), Tony Harvey (rhythm guitar), James Byrne (bass), Stash Klossowski (percussion) and Bobbie Clarke (drums). They rehearsed and cut demos at Barclay studios in Paris and narrowly missed being signed to the label. The Connection performed live on French TV and then toured Europe, crumbling during the tour in Spain.

== Fourth reunion: Vince Taylor and the Bobbie Clarke Noise ==
In 1974, Bobbie's band The Noise again backed Vince Taylor, and Barclay re-released the original 45 singles "Ready Teddy" and "C'mon Everybody". In 1978 T and P Records released more of their old efforts under the name "Vince Taylor and his Play Boys"

== The Man Who Drummed The World ==
In October 1987, Black Leather Productions released an EP, recorded in May 1985, entitled Bobbie Clarke, The Man Who Drummed The World, Live in Paris featuring the songs "Memphis Tennessee", "Twenty Flight Rock" and "Baby Blue".

== Recent records and performances ==
In 2000, RPM Records UK, a division of Cherry Red Records, released a digitally remixed CD of the groundbreaking Bodast album (it is closer to the original 1969 mix by Keith West than previous reissues). On 10–11 May 2003, Clarke performed in Paris at a concert billed as "The Vince Taylor Memorial Concert with the Bobbie Clarke Noise". In 2004, P&C Pin Up Disques, France, released a CD entitled Joey Greco – Bobbie Clarke – Joey and the Showmen – Live 2004.

== Autobiography ==
In 2017, Camion Blanc released his autobiography Bobbie Clarke Playboy & Showman - Les memoires du batteur de Vince Taylor et Johnny Hallyday. This was translated from English into French by Romain Decoret from Clark's original diary entries.

== Sources ==
- Woodman, Robert (2017). Bobbie Clarke Playboy & Showman - Les mémoires du batteur de Vince Taylor et Johnny Hallyday (in French). Translated by Romain Decoret. Camion Blanc. ISBN 978-2378480066.
