= Roy Flynn =

English music manager

Roy Flynn is an English former music manager. He managed The Speakeasy Club in 1960s London, in which capacity he associated with and befriended rock stars of the era like Keith Moon and Jimi Hendrix. He began managing bands, and after one night when Yes was called in at the last minute to replace Sly and the Family Stone at a 1968 gig, Flynn was so impressed with the band he offered to manage them.

Flynn would become best known for managing Yes, to whom he devoted his sole attention and much of his personal savings. The band was signed to Atlantic Records and recorded their first two albums on that label. But those albums failed to sell well in Britain and made no impression in the U.S., leaving most of the members unhappy with Flynn. As the band was writing songs and rehearsing for its third album, The Yes Album, at a Devonshire farmhouse he was renting for them, he and the band parted company.

After Brian Lane replaced him and Yes finally achieved the success it sought, Flynn negotiated a deal which, in addition to a share of the band's publishing revenues, gave him five percent of all its future revenue. They were not happy about this, and renamed a short Bill Bruford-penned instrumental on their next album, Fragile, "Five per Cent for Nothing", as a protest. Flynn claims he did not receive any revenue from the deal, and sued the band and Lane, eventually settling for what he considers to be a small portion of what he was owed. He has not managed any bands since then, and later ran pubs and restaurants in South West England.

== Career ==
Flynn started out in printing; he was a keen jazz fan. He began moving into nightclub management in the early 1960s with the Pontiac Club in Putney.

In 1966, Flynn opened The Speakeasy Club at 48 Margaret Street in London, just north of Soho. It soon became a regular hangout for popular musicians of the era, like The Beatles, and leading record label executives, along with film and television stars like Dudley Moore and Albert Finney. The presence of the former led to impromptu jam sessions. Jimi Hendrix, who became a close friend of Flynn's, was a frequent visitor and performer, known for jamming with whoever might be playing that night, on whatever instrument he could, Family's Charlie Whitney recalled. Ritchie Blackmore, later guitarist for Deep Purple, also sat in with many acts.

In the audiences watching were other prominent musicians of the day, some of whom distinguished themselves by their nonmusical antics. Cream drummer Ginger Baker once threw his meal at a rival; another drummer, The Who's Keith Moon was banned by Flynn from the club on three separate occasions. "The first time I banned [him] it was for spraying the bar with mace at 1am" says Flynn. "It emptied the club. Then once I looked through the glass window and Moon was on the dance floor with some girl totally naked." He could not remember what earned Moon his third ban, but Flynn always let him back in after he had begged sufficiently.

=== Yes management ===
In September 1968, Flynn was managing another club, Blaises, while The Speakeasy was temporarily closed in the wake of a fire. One night, Sly and the Family Stone canceled a scheduled performance. Casting about for a replacement on short notice, he consulted with a friend, future Charisma Records founder Tony Stratton Smith, who told him there was an unknown, unsigned band that lived just around the corner from the club.

That band was Yes, who came and played the gig, with Keith Emerson, Pete Townshend and Eric Clapton in the audience. Flynn was grateful, and so impressed with the band, that after they were done he went to them and offered to manage them, even though he had never managed a band. "[T]heir music was so exciting. I'd never heard anything like it and I wanted to help them" he told Yes biographer Chris Welch.

Within his first twenty-four hours as their manager, Flynn made a serious investment in Yes. He bought them a new drum kit, Hammond organ and a van to travel to gigs in. He guaranteed them a weekly salary of £25 (£400 in today's pounds), and rented space to live and practice in. Yes began to perform regularly at Soho's Marquee Club, and within two months they were the opening act for Cream at its farewell concerts in the Royal Albert Hall, which paid them only £25, a sum Flynn attributes to the penury of Robert Stigwood, that band's manager. They would play the Royal Albert again, opening for Janis Joplin.

A few months later, Stigwood was present at a concert Yes gave at another club, the Revolution, with record executives present, which Flynn hoped would get the band signed. Stigwood had just started his own label, RSO Records, and he and Atlantic Records founder Ahmet Ertegun both swore to the other at the show that they would be the one to sign Yes. Ertegun won, giving Yes a coveted place on Atlantic, but by taking advantage of Flynn's inexperience. The manager asked Ertegun how many albums he wanted the band to commit to, and Ertegun replied: "Wow ... Let's go for 15". Bassist Chris Squire, who was equally elated at the time, recalled after Ertegun's death in 2007 that as a result of being locked into such a long-term deal, the band's share of the album revenues was very low and they spent considerable time and effort during the 1970s trying to renegotiate those terms more favourably. (Note: In hindsight, Flynn agreed it would have made more sense to sign with Stigwood who, having just started his label and having few other artists (he had not yet signed The Bee Gees), would unlike Ertegun have been more willing to commit to promoting Yes.)

Yes thus began recording its self-titled first album, released late in July 1969. Flynn gave up managing the Speakeasy to concentrate on Yes. He turned down Peter Gabriel's offer for him to manage Genesis, which he later recalled as the biggest mistake of his life. The album was well-received critically but did not sell well. Yes toured to promote the record while writing songs for its next album, Time and a Word, released almost a year later to the same combination of encouraging reviews and disappointing sales.

During this time, Yes watched as other bands signed to Atlantic around the same time were far more successful. Led Zeppelin's first two albums sold well, particularly in the U.S. King Crimson's first album was extremely successful, enough that they opened for The Rolling Stones in Hyde Park. The Nice, precursors to Emerson, Lake & Palmer, were writing long compositions with symphony orchestras.

"Everywhere we looked, others flourished," wrote Bill Bruford, Yes's drummer at that time, years later. By contrast, during those two years, "Yes managed only to tread water, run red lights and lose money at gigs in Kidderminster that cost us more to do than we were paid." Flynn also admitted years later that he had been disappointed in the label's meagre promotional efforts. "The first two records we did with Atlantic weren't well distributed and didn't really reflect the excitement of the music", he told Welch. "I just think they did a cheap job." He took no advance from the label the first year he managed Yes, and only enough the second year to reimburse himself for what he had already spent on the band. (Note: Michael Tait, the band's driver, recalls finding out later, after the band's success, that Atlantic's main office in New York thought Yes was a folk group.)

Much of what Flynn had been able to do for Yes had resulted from his calling in favors owed from his time managing the Speakeasy, and as 1970 began those were mostly expended. The band began to talk about replacing him, a process that led to the departure of guitarist Peter Banks:

One of the reasons I was asked to go was because they started talking about getting rid of Roy. I said 'Well if he goes I go.' It was kind of a headstrong thing to say but I thought it was a rotten thing to do to Roy ... Nobody was more committed to Yes than Roy Flynn.

Flynn continued to support Banks financially after he left Yes, until he started Flash.

Banks was replaced by Steve Howe, who had himself performed at, as well as patronized, the Speakeasy, where he met his first wife, two years earlier as a member of The In Crowd, later known as Tomorrow. After touring to support Time and a Word, the band settled down on a Devonshire farm to write and rehearse songs for their third album, the last one Atlantic was contractually obligated to release. Several weeks into those sessions, Flynn, who had been paying the rent on the farm, came to visit and told the band that he could no longer afford to support them financially, ending their relationship.

Flynn later defended his tenure, noting that he had taken Yes from "£15 a night gigs to the Royal Albert Hall. That's creative management." He did agree that he may not have been as aggressive as he could have been with the band.

What is very difficult for artists to understand is that a third party is needed to promote their careers. They feel that it's only a matter of time before the world recognizes their all too obvious talent. This is the problem with management. The situation only works when the band is frightened of management. I didn't work like that.

Michael Tait, an Australian émigré to the UK who Flynn had hired to drive the band's tour van and remained associated with Yes for many years afterward, also found some fault with Flynn's handling of the band after they were signed.

Roy was a very nice guy and he had faith in the band in the beginning but he didn't have any real knowledge about what to do with them ... The band had a real slow start ... [Atlantic] had got the band for basically nothing so whether they were a hit or a miss didn't really matter to them.

=== After Yes ===
Yes soon found new management in Brian Lane, who had shared a hairstylist with Squire. He had come from an accounting background and done some promotion and management; after seeing Yes he thought they could be stars despite playing songs that were generally too long for radio airplay. He promised the band that The Yes Album would be more successful than their previous releases, and that occurred as it went into the top 10 of the UK's album chart within a few months of its release in early 1971. (Note: Lane accomplished this by taking advantage of that year's British postal strike, which prevented Melody Maker from compiling it since record stores at that time sent their sales reports in through the post. In its stead, Richard Branson began compiling one from the sales reported at his store, Virgin Records, and some others in London, which the BBC and the newspapers used as an alternative. Lane went to Virgin and bought every copy of The Yes Album he could for several weeks, making it one of the best-selling albums there and assuring its presence on the chart. When Melody Maker was able to resume publishing its chart, the album had taken off outside of London, eventually reaching No. 4.)

Except for his continuing commitment to Banks, Flynn gave up music management after parting ways with Yes. He felt was due some compensation for the time and money he had expended, and went to Lane's company, Hemdale, to negotiate a deal. As he had founded the band's publishing company and remained a director, he got 30 per cent of those revenues. In addition, he got five per cent of all the band's revenues in perpetuity.

When news of Flynn's agreement and its terms reached the band, they were very angry, feeling that he had gotten far more than he deserved. At the time they were recording Fragile, their fourth album, for which they had decided that every member would write something short that would show off their talents and allow newer fans to get to know them better as musicians, (Note: At the time Yes had made another personnel change, with original keyboardist Tony Kaye giving way to Rick Wakeman, so making sure listeners knew what each member could do was seen as particularly important.) balancing out four longer compositions which were group efforts. To express their bitterness about the Flynn deal, the band retitled a 35-second percussion-driven instrumental written by Bruford from "Suddenly It's Wednesday" to "Five per Cent for Nothing".

Fragile's release was an even greater boon to Yes than its predecessor had been, getting the band radio airplay and concert dates in North America. But Flynn saw no money from the deal he had made. He never received any notices about board meetings of the publishing company. At the end of 1971 he filed suit against the band and Hemdale (Bruford recalled Flynn years later as "an emotional man who, rightly, felt hard done by").

Almost two years later, he eventually accepted a $150,000 ($1,088,000 in modern dollars) settlement offered him by Hemdale. "It was peanuts and I didn't want to take it" he told Welch, still angry about it over 35 years later. But at the time he owed £6,000 (£65,000 in today's pounds) in legal bills, so he did. "To be honest, after two years I was just emotionally drained. It's part of my life I'd rather forget."

Many years later, he recalled, he and his wife ran into Yes singer Jon Anderson and his wife Jenny at the Reading Festival. The four had a long friendly conversation about how things had gone wrong in those early years and how they might have been done differently. "I just know I had done more than anyone else could have done for them at the time" Flynn said.

=== Hospitality ===
After receiving his settlement, Flynn left the music industry for good. He and his wife, Suzanne Bassett, a former model whom he had met during his Speakeasy days, moved out of London and spent two years renovating a Wiltshire farmhouse they bought. Once they had finished that, they bought the Horse & Groom pub in Charlton, near Malmesbury in 1984.

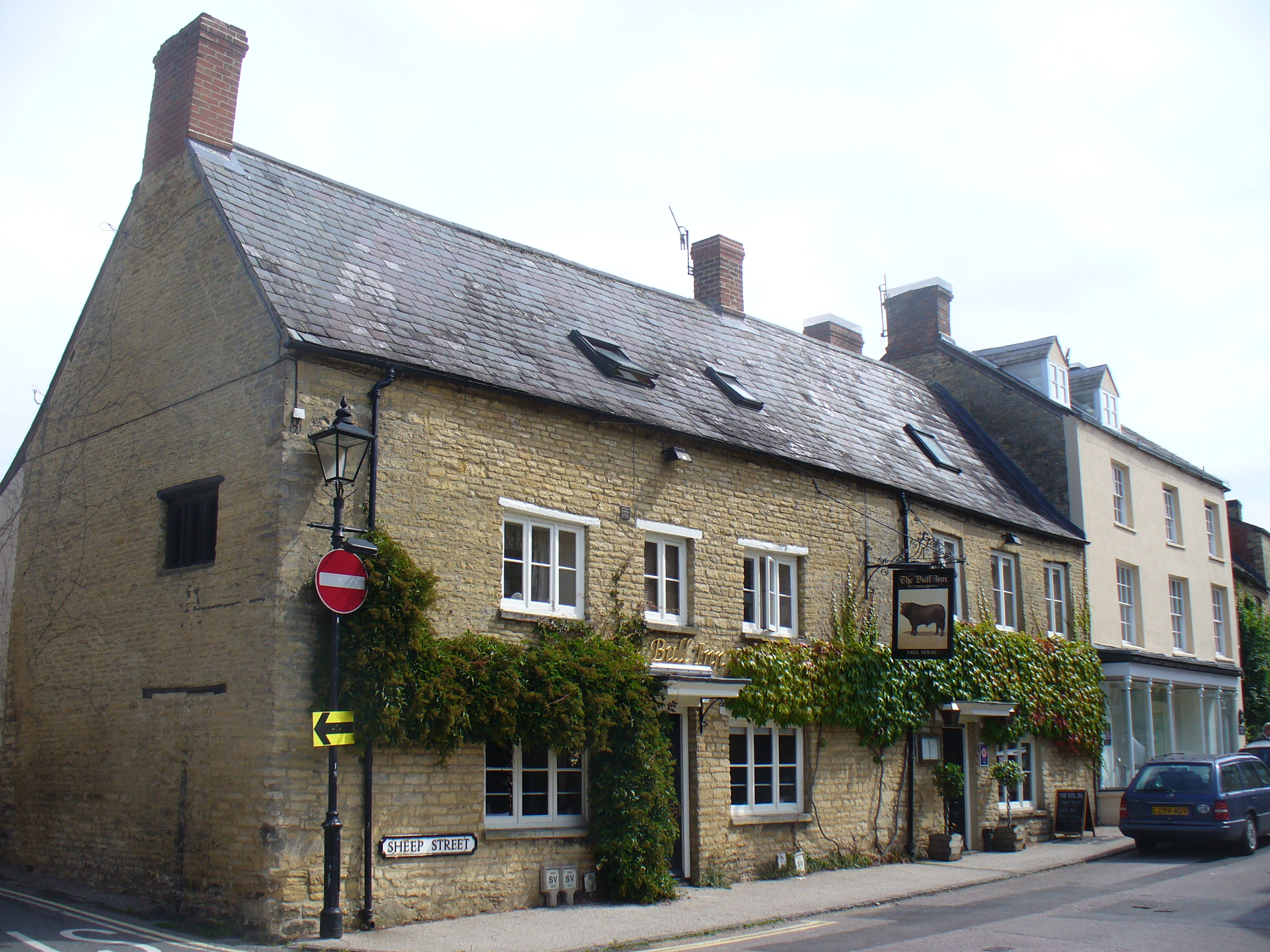
The Bull Inn, Charlbury, in 2011

The Flynns sold that to buy Pinks restaurant in Fairford. Six years later, they moved on to Standlake, in nearby Gloucestershire, where they owned and managed The Bell. Flynn felt his move into managing pubs was an even bigger mistake than turning down Peter Gabriel until they sold The Bell and bought The Bull Inn in Charlbury, West Oxfordshire. A year later, after restoring the 15th-century building to its original appearance, they were honoured as host and hostess of the year by readers of the Egon Ronay Guide.

== Retirement ==
In 2004 the Flynns sold the Bull. Six years later, Flynn put some of his mementoes from his days running the Speakeasy up for auction at Bonhams in Knightsbridge. They included the filing cabinet with the club's membership cards, and a light-blue suit with black maroon lining and Nehru collar that Flynn had personally picked up from Granny Takes a Trip, the popular psychedelia-influenced boutique of that era, to bring to Jimi Hendrix on tour in New York. Flynn decided to stay with Hendrix and the Experience for a while, and before he went back to London Hendrix gave him the suit as a gift. It drew the most attention of any of his auctioned items at Bonhams, with a reserve price of £2,000.

According to an article in the Oxford Mail, the item that meant most to Flynn was related to his time managing Yes. For Christmas 1968, the band members had presented him with a Dunhill 70 cigarette lighter. He still had it, along with the box and the wrapping paper, on which Anderson had written:

To Roy Flynn. Who has done more for us than any other men put together in the pop music business. Looking forward to a long + happy association. Hope this small gift will enlighten you as much as you have enlightened us. A Very Happy Christmas. YES.

It was signed by all five members, and sold for £864.
