= Vincent Flaherty =

American actor and political activist

Vince Flaherty
- Occupations: Film producer, historian, actor, singer-songwriter, writer, political activist
- Years active: 1964–present
- Political party: Independent, Democratic

Vince Flaherty is an American producer, recording artist, writer, and political activist.

In 2014, he was a Democratic candidate for the U.S. House to represent the 33rd Congressional District of California on a platform of fulfilling 434 promises. According to his candidate statement, he promised to work to "properly allocate water resources, implement traffic solutions, overturn the Citizens United decision, restore the California Attorney General's right to defend consumers from banks, implement a genuine homeowner protection act, and fight for election reform, legislative reform, judicial reform, bank reform, affordable health care, clean water, green energy, and phasing out dependence on nuclear energy and oil without sacrificing jobs or profits. He is in favor of restructuring banks into manageable parts that will not place short-sighted gains ahead of economic stability. He promises to balance the budget, eliminate the debt and restore the economy by cutting taxes without cutting education or damaging transportation and trade."

In 2011, he was an unsuccessful Independent candidate for the United States House of Representatives from California. In that campaign, he focused upon constitutionalism, civil rights, consumer protection, and environmentalism. He advocated the resolution of economic and housing crises, public financing of political campaigns, reform of the banking and financial systems, restoration of the rights of attorneys general to defend consumers regarding certain banking practices, transparency of the Federal Reserve System, the improved treatment and housing assistance for military veterans, secure borders, and health care reform.

== Early entertainment career ==
His show business career started as a child actor in the CBS western television series, The Texan starring Rory Calhoun, and in the recurring role of a schoolboy on ABC's sitcom, The Donna Reed Show. In addition to television appearances, he has acted in and produced such feature films as A Gun, A Car, A Blonde, starring Billy Bob Thornton and John Ritter, and Sin-Jin Smyth, starring Jonathan Davis, Richard Tyson, Don Stroud, and Roddy Piper.

His first record sessions included Ernie Freeman, and the then unknown Daryl Dragon, Charles Wright and Jimi Hendrix who was at the time working under the name Jimmy James. Also unsigned at the time, was a band called Love consisting of Bryan MacLean (rhythm guitar), Johnny Echols (lead guitar), Ken Forssi (bass) and Don Conka (drums). Flaherty sat in with the group at L.A. clubs called The Brave New World and Bito Lido's, and the group minus their leader Arthur Lee, backed him up on several records. Meanwhile, Love attracted a huge following at Bito Lido's, and word of Vince's distinctive style of guitar and harmonica playing spread, enabling him to become booked on sessions with L.A. Rock and Blues artists, such as Etta James.

In later years, original members of Love mentioned that his arrangement of "Yes It's True", recorded three months earlier than Love's biggest hit "7&7 Is", was the band's inspiration to change Arthur Lee's previously slow folk song into a driving, rolling beat that reaches an explosive crescendo and then starts up slow again.

Songwriter Sharon Sheeley, ("Somethin Else", "Poor Little Fool") was Vince's girlfriend at the time. She told her friends that he reminded her of her fiancé, rocker Eddie Cochran who was killed in a car crash in London. Sheeley took Flaherty to London for a try out with The Playboys, after their front man Vince Taylor overdosed on LSD. The audition didn't work out and The Playboys became The Bobbie Clarke Noise, named after their leader, who was the first known rock drummer to use a double bass. Later, Bobbie Clarke came to America and replaced Love's drummer Don Conka, on Flaherty's recordings with Love.

Afterward, Flaherty took over the front man spot for a group called The Elves Themselves, and recorded a single called "The Certificate" that included Jimi Hendrix on guitar, Ken Forssi on bass and Bobbie Clarke on drums. Vince and The Elves also made a record entitled "Feel Alright" produced by Vic Diaz of the Matadors, purportedly for Lou Adler, the producer of Jan and Dean, and The Mamas & the Papas. More recordings might have been available, but Clarke soon garnered the distinction of becoming the first UK rocker to be busted for pot and swiftly deported.

Subsequently, Flaherty was cast to star in a Western movie and departed for Italy. The movie was never completed. Instead, Flaherty was rendered unconscious, fed intravenously, and kept asleep for a period of nearly three months. The producers maintained the star had gone insane, and they collected a large sum from the completion bond company. Meanwhile, no one had heard anything from Flaherty. Sharon Sheeley found out where he was, and with the help of Gordon Waller, half of the singing duo Peter and Gordon, obtained custody papers from Gordon's father, a prominent London physician. Together Sharon and Gordon traveled to the Villa Belvedere outside of Rome where Flaherty was being held and obtained his release. The bizarre circumstance left Flaherty a wreck and he was not able to record or effectively pursue a career for several years.

In 1969, Jimi Hendrix had a surprise lineup change for the last day of the concert at Devonshire Downs, and he utilized Flaherty to deliver and set up the equipment of Buddy Miles. That date marked end of the Jimi Hendrix Experience and the advent of Jimi's new group with Buddy Miles and Billy Cox. No one including the Experience's Noel Redding and Mitch Mitchell realized that Hendrix was changing his band because he was given to spontaneously jamming with so many different players.

== Producer and actor ==
Years later, Vince Flaherty re-appeared as a producer and actor in over 100 feature films and television movies. Some of his credits include Ladies Man, The Fall Guy, Blacke's Magic, Masquerade, Capitol, Law of the Sea, The Legend of Billy Blood, Pendulum and Championship Polo.

== Filmography ==
=== Filmography – producer ===
- Tough Love (2013) (executive producer)
- Sin-Jin Smyth (2008) (executive producer)
- Genevieve (2006) (associate producer)
- A Day for the Birds (2005) (producer)
- The Missing (2005) (executive producer)
- Double Fault (2001) (executive producer
- Wendell's Sweet Christmas (1999) (associate producer)
- A Gun, A Car, A Blonde (1998) (associate producer)
- El Regreso (1996) (executive producer) aka The Return of Billy Blood (1996) (Mexico)
- Viva Billy Blood (1995) (executive producer) (Mexico)
- Scoring (1995) (associate producer)
- La Leyenda (1994) (producer) aka The Legend of Billy Blood (1994) (Mexico)
- Junkyard (1993) (associate producer)
- Championship Polo (1991) (TV) (executive producer)
- The Lost Mines of El Diablo (1988) (associate producer)

=== Filmography – actor ===
- Sin-Jin Smyth (2008) Troublemaker
- A Gun, A Car, A Blonde (1998) — Petrovich No. 1
- Regreso, El (1996) — Billy Blood, a.k.a. The Return of Billy Blood (1996) (Mexico)
- Viva Billy Blood (1995) — Billy Blood (Mexico)
- Leyenda, La (1994) — Billy Blood, a.k.a. The Legend of Billy Blood (1994) (Mexico)
- Judge, The (1989) (TV) — Richard Bauer
- Deadly Addiction (1988) — Rockhouse Leader
- Divorce Court (1987) (TV) — Billy Coe
- Divorce Court (1986) (TV) — Dr. Jim Franklin (1987)
- Black's Magic (1986) (TV) — Captain Ryder
- Webster (1983)(TV) — Chad (1987)
- Masquerade (1983) (TV) — U.S. Commercial Attaché
- Capitol (1982) (TV) — Bartender (1985)
- Fame (1982) (TV) — Mounted Police Officer
- Moonlight (1982) (TV) — Young Stockbroker
- Charlie's Angels (1981) (TV) — Nick
- The Fall Guy (1981) (TV) — Stan Edwards
- Strike Force (1981) (TV) — Detective Jim O'Brien, episode "Death Faire"
- Fantasy (1981) (TV) — Audience Plant/French Voiceover
- Park Place (1981) (TV) — George Simmons
- Ladies Man (1980) (TV) — Lawrence Stallings
- Knots Landing (1979) (TV) — Harold Waite (1983)
- A Man Called Sloane (1979) (TV) — Mat (1980)
- B. J. and the Bear (1979) (TV) — Deputy Carter
- Baa Baa Black Sheep (1976) (TV) — Lieutenant Adams
- Little House on the Prairie (1974) (TV) — Jim (1981)
- Barnaby Jones (1973) (TV) — Cal Brannon (1985)
- The Young and the Restless (1973) (TV) — Norman Wells (1984)
- Marcus Welby, M.D. (1969)(TV) — Rick Summers (1974)
- One Life to Live (1968) (TV) — Bill Davis (1980)
- Pendulum (1968) — Street Tough
- Law of the Sea (1968) — Lieutenant Harrington
- The Donna Reed Show (1963–1964) (TV) — Mike, episode "Episode in A Flat"
- General Hospital (1963) (TV) — Dr. Steve Reynolds 1973
- The Texan (1958) (TV) — Child

== Private life ==
He was a director of the Pacific Palisades Historical Society and was a member of the Pacific Palisades Community Council, credited with saving a 16-acre (65,000 m^{2}) wooded area in the Palisades, known as The Ocean Woods, from a tract of 23 homes. He still performs with his band The Invincebles at venues in the Los Angeles area.

== References and Sources ==
- Einarson, John, Forever Changes, Arthur Lee and the Book of Love, Jawbone Press, London 2010, p.p. 84, 85
- Whiteside, Jonny, Forever Love, LA Weekly, August 7, 2006
- Music Picks, LA Weekly, June 21, 2006
- Vincent Flaherty at IMDb
- Love website, Denmark
- Vince Flaherty Campaign Website
- League of Women Voters information for Vince Flaherty

Specific
