= Sin-Jin Smyth =

- Directed by: Ethan Dettenmaier
- Screenplay by: Ethan Dettenmaier
- Produced by: Vince Flaherty; SnapKick Pictures
- Starring: Roddy Piper; Richard Tyson; Jacqueline Moore; Jonathan Davis; Don Stroud
- Music by: Midnight Syndicate
- Distributed by: Classic Pictures Inc.
- Running time: n/a
- Country: United States
- Language: English
- Budget: $14 million

Sin-Jin Smyth is an unreleased horror film written and directed by Ethan Dettenmaier, based on the urban legend surrounding Kansas's Stull Cemetery. The story involves the Devil simultaneously appearing in two places, the high plains of India and one cemetery in Kansas every Halloween at midnight.

The film stars Roddy Piper, Jonathan Davis (vocalist of the nu metal band Korn), Richard Tyson, Don Stroud, and Jacqueline Moore and also features Kevin Gage, Camden Toy, Billy Duffy (guitarist of the hard rock band The Cult), and Charles Cyphers.

== Synopsis ==
Sin-Jin Smyth takes place over the weekend of Halloween in an America that has become a police state. On November 2 (The Day of the Dead) two federal marshals report to a jail in Shinbone, Kansas, to transfer a prisoner, known as Sin Jin Smyth, during the tornado warning.

== Release problems ==
The film was slated for release in late 2006 but was delayed. There was speculation as to whether the movie will ever be released, but IMDb revised the project status in January 2007 to “post-production”, even though principal photography had yet to be completed. The original page on IMDb was subsequently deleted and a new one created with the title Sin-Jin and a release date of 2009. As of October 2025, the film has yet to complete principal photography, with some online sources citing a lack of funding. One of the actresses in the film, Eileen Dietz, remarked in 2008 that the film was “never coming out”.

Roddy Piper, talking to Fangoria in 2008, said: “They keep hyping it like it's gonna come out, and it's just not finished, and I don't like the fact that they're using my name. I was talking to Richard Tyson about it, saying 'You know, I'm just gonna pull it off the market', but he said 'Leave it out there, because you never know—they might come around'. So, we decided to see what the director, and his people can do to get it back up. They spent all their money, and they didn't have a completion bond—so I hear, anyway.”
