= Bodast =

British rock group

- Also known as: Canto
- Origin: London, England
- Years active: 1968–1969
- Past members: Bobbie Clarke; Dave Curtis; Steve Howe; Clive Maldoon

Bodast (also known as Canto) were a late 1960s rock group from London, England. Its most notable member was Steve Howe, later to join the progressive rock band Yes. The other members were Clive Maldoon (born Clive Skinner) on guitar and vocals, Dave Curtiss on bass and Bobbie Clarke on drums. The name of the group came from the first two letters of the members' first names: BObbie, DAve, STeve.

The group recorded an album for Tetragrammaton Records in 1968. The label had success in the United States with Deep Purple, but went out of business just before the scheduled release date for the Bodast album.

A portion of a song from the Bodast album titled "Nether Street" was renamed "Würm" and re-used as part of the song "Starship Trooper" from The Yes Album in 1971. Howe says fragments of songs he was working on for Bodast also turned up later in Yes's "South Side of the Sky" and "Close to the Edge", and in Asia's "One Step Closer", from that band's debut album.

The 1968 Bodast recordings were released in 1981, and by RPM Records in 2000. Bassist Dave Curtiss formed a folk duo with Clive Maldoon called Curtiss Maldoon in 1971. They recorded two albums. The first, simply called Curtiss Maldoon, was released in October 1971. Steve Howe played on two songs on the album. The second album, Maldoon, was released in November 1973.

== Discography ==
- The Bodast Tapes - Featuring Steve Howe (1981 Cherry Red – BRED 12)
- The Early Years (Steve Howe with Bodast - printed in France, 1988 & 1990)
- Spectral Nether Street: The Complete Collection (RPM Records, 2000)
- Towards Utopia (2017 Esoteric Recordings – ECLEC 2593)
