= South Side of the Sky =

Song by Yes

from the album Fragile
- Released: 12 November 1971 (UK); 4 January 1972 (US)
- Recorded: August-September 1971
- Genre: Progressive rock; jazz rock; psychedelic rock
- Length: 8:04
- Label: Atlantic
- Songwriters: Jon Anderson; Chris Squire; Rick Wakeman (uncredited)
- Producers: Yes; Eddy Offord

"South Side of the Sky" is a song by progressive rock band Yes from their album Fragile.

== Description ==
It opens with the sound of a howling wind, then the song starts after a thunder strike, bursting into a heavy, riff-dominated rock song. At around 2:08, Rick Wakeman's piano comes in along with another few seconds of wind. At around 3:19, Chris Squire, Steve Howe and Jon Anderson start singing wordless vocal harmonies along with the piano. This continues until about 5:42, when the earlier heavy riff part returns, with the wind in the background. The song fades out in the end to the same howling wind that occurred throughout.

Ultimate Classic Rock critic Ryan Reed described "South Side of the Sky" as being Yes' 6th heaviest song, saying that "Howe goes wild with some of his most ferocious guitar tones...and engineer Eddy Offord sharpens every angular riff into a dagger."

Anderson stated that "This is a song about climbing mountains. It’s dangerous, but we all must climb mountains every day."

The original and a new "acoustic" version of this song, with piano as the dominant instrument and without the sound effects, appears on the 2004 U.S. version of the three-disc compilation album The Ultimate Yes: 35th Anniversary Collection. This new version is on the third disc, which consists of material newly recorded for the album, while the original version of the track appears on the first disc.

== Production, lyrical content ==
According to Jon Anderson, the inspiration for lyrics came from an article which claims that "sleep is death's little sister", and the lyrics expand on the idea that death could be beautiful. The mountain referenced in the lyrics is a goal humanity struggles to attain, after which there is death, a set of transitions leading to "eternal sleep or the next life span". Chris Squire explained that Anderson wrote the first verse with acoustic guitar; Squire takes credit for the riff in the chorus (in the words of Steve Howe, "do-de-do-do-do") and for a section in the middle of the song. The guitar riff for the song, said Steve Howe, came from a composition by his earlier band, Bodast, and the song was rarely played live because "the vocal section came up short".

In the liner notes of the remastered edition of Fragile, it is said that this song is about a tragic polar expedition that ends in death, as evidenced by lyrics such as "a river, a mountain to be crossed / the sunshine, in mountains sometimes lost / around the south side, so cold that we cried" and "the moments, seem lost in all the noise / a snow storm, a stimulating voice". In the second half of the song, the references to the cold switch to lyrics that seem to reflect hypothermia, such as "of warmth of the sky / of warmth when you die" and "were we ever warmer on that day?". In the introduction to this song in Yes' 2003 concert at the Montreux Jazz Festival, Jon Anderson said, "This is a song about climbing mountains... It's dangerous, but we all must climb mountains every day."

Rick Wakeman contributed to the writing of "South Side of the Sky" (and fellow album piece "Heart of the Sunrise") by adding piano interludes to both songs, but was not credited due to contractual conflicts.

== Personnel ==
- Jon Anderson – lead vocals
- Steve Howe – electric guitars, backing vocals
- Chris Squire – bass guitar, backing vocals
- Rick Wakeman – Hammond organ, grand piano, Minimoog
- Bill Bruford – drums, percussion
