= Brian Lane (music manager) =

British music manager

- Birth name: Harvey Freed
- Occupation: Music manager

Brian Lane (born Harvey Freed) is a British music manager. Lane has managed a variety of acts including Katherine Jenkins, Donovan, Alan O'Day, Asia, Yes, Anderson Bruford Wakeman Howe, A-ha, Vangelis, The Buggles, It Bites, A*Teens and Heather Small. He currently manages Rick Wakeman. He also managed Yes Featuring Jon Anderson, Trevor Rabin, Rick Wakeman.

== Biography ==
Lane, who worked for the Hemdale Company, began managing Yes in 1970, taking over from Roy Flynn, who secured a deal with Lane. Lane was instrumental in arranging for The Buggles, another group he managed, to join Yes for their 1980 album Drama. Lane managed Yes until the end of their 1980 tour supporting that album.

Lane helped form the group Asia, which emerged from the collapse of Yes in early 1981, having introduced vocalist/bassist John Wetton to ex-Yes guitarist Steve Howe. Lane managed the band and came up with their name. In the late 1980s, Lane managed a rival group of former Yes members, Anderson Bruford Wakeman Howe (ABWH). He also managed GTR. In 1993, Lane formed Fragile Records.

Lane began managing Katherine Jenkins in 2003, but the two parted ways acrimoniously in 2009. In the 2010s, he became the manager of Rick Wakeman (a member of Yes and then ABWH), and in January 2016, Lane was announced as the manager of a new supergroup of former Yes members, Anderson, Rabin and Wakeman.

For much of his career, Lane worked in the UK, before moving to Scandinavia in the 2000s. In 2015, he became head of United Stage International, the global arm of Swedish artist management company United Stage, with an office in London.
