= Songs from Tsongas =

Live album by Yes
- Released: 9 August 2005 (DVD); 22 September 2014 (CD/Blu-ray)
- Recorded: 15 May 2004
- Venue: Tsongas Arena (Lowell, Massachusetts)
- Genre: Progressive rock
- Length: 2 hours 58 minutes
- Label: Image Entertainment
- Director: Joe Thomas
- Producer: Joe Thomas

Yes chronology
Yes Remixes (2003)	Songs from Tsongas (2005)	The Word Is Live (2005)

Yes video chronology
Yes Acoustic: Guaranteed No Hiss (2004)	Songs from Tsongas (2005)	Live at Montreux 2003 (2007)

Songs from Tsongas: 35th Anniversary Concert is a live video and album by the English rock band Yes, released on DVD in 2005 and CD and Blu-ray in 2014 by Image Entertainment. It was recorded at the Tsongas Arena in Lowell, Massachusetts on 15 May 2004 during the band's 2004 tour in celebration of their 35th anniversary. It is the band's last live album to feature original singer Jon Anderson.

== Contents ==
The setlist features songs from all eras of the band's career, including a rare performance of "Every Little Thing" from their first album, Yes (1969) and "Mind Drive" from Keys to Ascension 2 (1997)

== Release ==
On 23 September 2014, a Deluxe Edition was released on DVD, Blu-ray, and three CDs. The video also features a 70-minute edit of the band's show at the Lugano Jazz Festival in Lugano, Switzerland on 8 July 2004. The Japanese edition of the Blu-ray release includes the entire show at Lugano and "Ritual (Nous sommes du soleil)" in the correct place in the Lowell show, instead of being offered as a bonus track on the international release. On both editions, the Lugano concert is presented in standard definition with 720x480 resolution.

== Track listing ==
=== 2004 DVD ===
Disc One

Disc 1
No.	Title	Writer(s)	Length
1.	"Intro/Firebird Suite"	Igor Stravinsky	1:56
2.	"Going for the One"	Jon Anderson	5:20
3.	"Sweet Dreams" (Preceded by an Alan White solo.)	Anderson; David Foster	6:34
4.	"Your Move/I've Seen All Good People"	Anderson; Chris Squire	6:37
5.	"Mind Drive Parts 1 & 2"	Anderson; Squire; Alan White; Steve Howe; Rick Wakeman	6:56
6.	"South Side of the Sky"	Anderson; Squire	9:56
7.	"Turn of the Century"	Anderson; Howe; White	7:50
8.	"My Eyes/Mind Drive Part 3"	Anderson; Squire; White; Howe	6:51
9.	"Yours Is No Disgrace"	Bill Bruford; Howe; Tony Kaye; Anderson; Squire	12:17

Bonus Feature: Roger Dean interview

Disc 2
No.	Title	Writer(s)	Length
1.	"The Meeting Room/The Meeting"	Wakeman/: Anderson; Bruford; Howe; Wakeman	3:24
2.	"Long Distance Runaround"	Anderson	3:28
3.	"Wonderous Stories"	Anderson	4:05
4.	"Time Is Time"	Anderson; Howe; Squire; White; Larry Groupe	2:32
5.	"Roundabout"	Anderson; Howe	5:45
6.	"Show Me"	Anderson	3:56
7.	"Owner of a Lonely Heart"	Trevor Rabin; Anderson; Squire; Trevor Horn	4:30
8.	"Second Initial"	Howe	5:00
9.	"Rhythm of Love"	Kaye; Rabin; Anderson; Squire	5:13
10.	"And You and I"	Anderson; Bruford; Howe; Squire	11:08
11.	"Ritual"	Howe; Squire; Wakeman; White; Anderson	19:01
12.	"Every Little Thing"	John Lennon; Paul McCartney	4:53
13.	"Starship Trooper"	Anderson; Squire	12:19

=== 2014 Blu-ray and CD ===
CD 1

1. "Intro/Firebird Suite"
2. "Going for the One"
3. "Sweet Dreams"
4. "I've Seen All Good People"
5. "Mind Drive Parts 1 & 2"
6. "South Side of the Sky"
7. "Turn of the Century"
8. "My Eyes"
9. "Mind Drive Part 3"
10. "Yours Is No Disgrace"

CD 2

1. "The Meeting (Piano Solo)"
2. "Long Distance Runaround"
3. "Wonderous Stories"
4. "Time Is Time"
5. "Roundabout"
6. "Show Me"
7. "Owner of a Lonely Heart"
8. "Second Initial (Guitar Solo)"
9. "Rhythm of Love"

CD 3

1. "And You and I"
2. "Ritual (Nous Sommes du Soleil)"
3. "Every Little Thing"
4. "Starship Trooper"

Blu-ray Bonus Features

1. "Ritual (Nous Sommes du Soleil)"
2. Roger Dean interview
3. Live in Lugano 2004:
  1. "Firebird Suite"
  2. "Going for the One"
  3. "Sweet Dreams"
  4. "I've Seen All Good People"
  5. "Long Distance Runaround"
  6. "The Fish"
  7. "Owner of a Lonely Heart"
  8. "And You and I"
  9. "Starship Trooper"
  10. "Roundabout"

== Personnel ==
- Jon Anderson – vocals, MIDI guitar, percussion, keyboards
- Steve Howe – guitars, vocals, Portuguese guitar
- Rick Wakeman – keyboards, synthesizers, piano
- Chris Squire – bass, harmonica, vocals
- Alan White – drums, percussion

Production

- Joe Thomas – producer, director, audio mixing
- Jordan Berliant, 10th Street Entertainment – executive producer
- Christine Davies – associate producer
- Skip Masters – editing
- Frank Pappalardo – audio mixing, surround sound mix
- Dave Moyer – engineer in charge
- Don Adydan – addition engineer
- Timothy Powell, Metro Mobile Recording – audio recording
- Matthew D'Amico – DVD producer
- Jeff Varner – DVD producer
- Gottlieb Bros – photography

== Charts ==
Weekly chart performance for Songs from Tsongas
Chart (2014)	Peak position
Belgian Albums (Ultratop Flanders)	189
Belgian Albums (Ultratop Wallonia)	142
UK Rock & Metal Albums (OCC)	11
