= Tsongas Center =

Multi-purpose facility in Lowell, Massachusetts

Tsongas Center at UMass Lowell

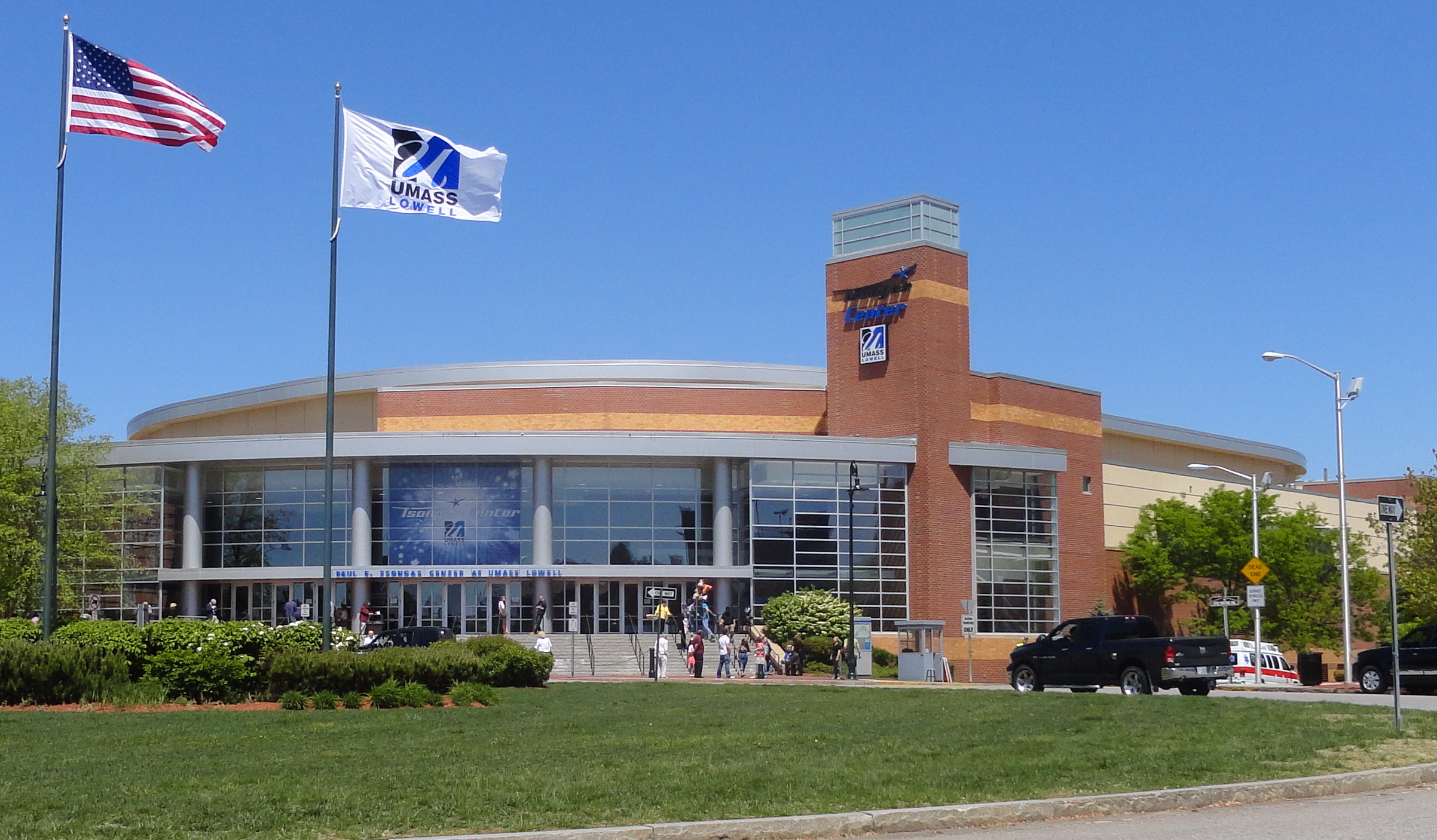
- Interactive map of Tsongas Center at UMass Lowell
- Full name: Paul E. Tsongas Center at UMass Lowell
- Former names: Tsongas Arena (1998-Oct. 2009)
- Address: 300 Martin Luther King Jr. Way
- Location: Lowell, Massachusetts
- Coordinates: 42.650228°N 71.313248°W
- Owner: University of Massachusetts Lowell
- Operator: Spectra
- Capacity: 6,500 (hockey and basketball); 7,800 (concerts); 10,003 (wrestling)

Construction
- Groundbreaking: 1996
- Opened: January 27, 1998
- Cost: $24 million (original) $5 million (2010-11 renovations)

Tenants
- UMass Lowell River Hawks (NCAA) (1998–present); Lowell Lock Monsters/Devils (AHL) (1998–2010); 3ICE Boston (3ICE) (2023–present); Massachusetts Pirates (IFL) (2024–2025); Boston Fleet (PWHL) (2024–2026)

Website
- tsongascenter.com

Tsongas Center at UMass Lowell (formerly Tsongas Arena) is a multi-purpose facility owned by the University of Massachusetts Lowell and located in Lowell, Massachusetts. The arena was opened on January 27, 1998, and dedicated to the memory of the late Paul Tsongas, prominent Lowell native and U.S. senator. The arena was built with $4 million in funding from both the city and the university, plus another $20 million contributed from the Commonwealth of Massachusetts.

== About the arena ==
The facility is home to the NCAA Division I University of Massachusetts Lowell River Hawks ice hockey team, which competes in the Hockey East Association and men's basketball team which play for the America East Conference. It is also home to the Massachusetts Pirates of the Indoor football League. The facility was also home to the Lowell Lock Monsters and the Lowell Devils ice hockey team, which competed in the American Hockey League from 1998 to 2010. The Devils ended their stay in Lowell due to being unable to negotiate a new lease after ownership was sold to UMass Lowell and moved to Albany, New York, to compete as the Albany Devils.

The Tsongas Center, which seats approximately 6,500 for hockey and 7,800 for concerts and other events, is the site of major concerts and other public events, including job fairs, skating competitions and graduation ceremonies for area high schools, colleges and universities. It also hosts major university events, such as the annual Commencement ceremonies, Open House for prospective students and the Chancellor's Speaker Series. The series debuted in 2012 with bestselling author Stephen King. Also in 2012, the Tsongas Center was the site of a debate between then-incumbent U.S. Sen. Scott Brown and challenger Elizabeth Warren, which drew more than 5,000 people and was covered by more than 100 media outlets, including NBC News and MSNBC.

In 2004, alternative rock pioneers Pixies recorded their live concert DVD and high-definition television special "The Pixies: Come Home Live 2004 World Tour" at the Tsongas Arena. The same year, progressive rock band Yes released a DVD of their 35th anniversary tour performance at the venue titled Songs from Tsongas.

In 2009, the boxing scenes of the 2010 film The Fighter were filmed at the Tsongas Center, with Mark Wahlberg portraying Lowell-born champion boxer Micky Ward and Christian Bale portraying his brother Dicky Eklund.

In 2010, Canadian rapper Drake notably performed a show at the Tsongas Center.

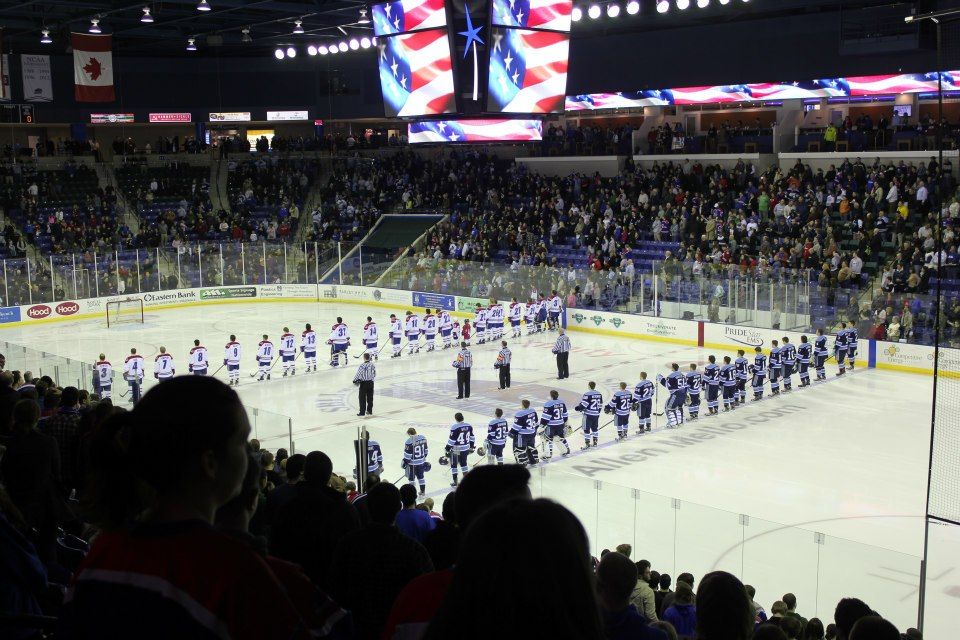
Interior of the arena as seen in 2013

UMass Lowell and the city of Lowell entered into negotiations in 2009 with the intent to transfer ownership of the arena and the land adjacent to it to the university. In late October 2009, it was reported that the deal had been reached with UMass Lowell committing to major renovations to the facility. In a ceremony during a game against Boston University on October 30, 2009, the deal transferring ownership to the university was signed. UMass Lowell formally took control of the arena on February 5, 2010, after completing a $1 transaction.

UMass Lowell has spent more than $5 million to renovate the arena since its acquisition. LED "ribbon" boards were installed in the winter of 2010. A new high-definition video scoreboard and sound system were installed during the summer 2010. A new club seating area was built in conjunction with a new upscale bar. In the summer of 2011, new ice-making equipment was installed, followed by new luxury boxes and press box in 2012.

In March 2017, the arena played host to the second NWHL Isobel Cup finals between the Buffalo Beauts and Boston Pride.

The arena played host to NXT Battleground, a WWE premium live event for its NXT brand, on May 28, 2023. The arena also played host to Ring of Honor's (ROH) pay-per-view Death Before Dishonor on July 23, 2022. The arena also hosted TNA Wrestling's Lockdown pay-per-view on April 26, 2008 and hosted its Bound for Glory PPV on October 12, 2025.

Preceded by Tully Forum	Home of the UMass Lowell River Hawks; 1998 – present	Succeeded by current
Preceded by Family Arena	Host of Lockdown; 2008	Succeeded by Liacouras Center
