= Yesspeak =

Video by Yes
- Released: 26 January 2004
- Recorded: 2003
- Genre: Progressive rock
- Label: Classic Pictures

Yes chronology
The Ultimate Yes: 35th Anniversary Collection (2003)	Yesspeak (2004)	Yes Acoustic: Guaranteed No Hiss (2004)

Yesspeak is a film chronicling the then current lineup of the progressive rock group Yes (featuring Jon Anderson, Steve Howe, Rick Wakeman, Chris Squire, and Alan White) directed by Robert Garofalo and narrated by Roger Daltrey. A 75-minute version of the film premiered in theatres across the United States on 26 January 2004, and was followed by a closed-circuit live acoustic performance by Yes in front of a small studio audience (resulting in the DVD Yes Acoustic: Guaranteed No Hiss).

An extended version of the documentary of 3 hours in length was released as a 2 DVD set. Divided into ten chapters, the programme systematically covers the background, history, and outlook of the group before an extended interview with each of the five members of the group. There are also discussions with members on the band's music and glimpses of the band's 2003 world tour.

== Personnel ==
- Jon Anderson: vocals, guitar, percussion
- Steve Howe: guitar, vocals
- Rick Wakeman: keyboards
- Chris Squire: bass, vocals
- Alan White: drums
