= Yes Acoustic: Guaranteed No Hiss =

Video by Yes
- Released: October 2004
- Recorded: 26 January 2004
- Genre: Progressive rock, folk rock
- Length: 38 minutes
- Label: Classic Pictures

Yes chronology
Yesspeak (2004)	Yes Acoustic: Guaranteed No Hiss (2004)	Songs from Tsongas (2005)

Yes Acoustic: Guaranteed No Hiss is the video release of an acoustic concert by the progressive rock group Yes recorded live on 26 January 2004, and broadcast live to movie theaters around the United States following the première of the documentary Yesspeak. After the film was played in theaters, cameras cut live to a small studio in California with an audience of about 100 people, where Yes performed the first complete acoustic concert of their career.

== Personnel ==
- Jon Anderson: vocals, guitar, percussion
- Steve Howe: guitar, vocals
- Rick Wakeman: piano
- Chris Squire: bass, vocals
- Alan White: drums

== Track listing ==
No.	Title	Writer(s)	Length
1.	"Tiger Rag"	Harry DeCosta, Eddie Edwards, Nick LaRocca, Henry Ragas, Tony Sbarbaro
2.	"Long Distance Runaround"	Jon Anderson
3.	"South Side of the Sky"	Anderson, Chris Squire, Rick Wakeman (uncredited)
4.	"Show Me"	Anderson
5.	"Roundabout"	Anderson, Steve Howe
6.	"Time Is Time"	Anderson, Howe, Squire, Alan White
7.	"Intersection Blues"	Howe
8.	"I've Seen All Good People"	Anderson, Squire
