= Every Little Thing (Beatles song) =

- Cover of the Northern Songs sheet music

Song by the Beatles

from the album Beatles for Sale
- Released: 4 December 1964
- Recorded: 29–30 September 1964
- Studio: EMI, London
- Genre: Pop rock
- Length: 2:01
- Label: Parlophone
- Songwriter: Lennon–McCartney
- Producer: George Martin

"Every Little Thing" is a song by the English rock band the Beatles from their 1964 album Beatles for Sale. It was primarily written by Paul McCartney and credited to the Lennon–McCartney partnership. Described as a pop rock song, it continued a pattern of love-themed songs from the band.

The song was recorded from 29 to 30 September 1964 at EMI Studios in London. The first song the band recorded after returning from their North American tour, it took nine takes to complete. Starr plays a timpani on the recording to punctuate the song's lyrics. The specifics of who played certain guitar parts on the track have been disputed among Beatles historians, with some suggesting George Harrison played lead guitar and others claiming it was McCartney, so on.

"Every Little Thing" was released on 4 December 1964 in the United Kingdom on Beatles for Sale, and Capitol Records issued the song in the United States on Beatles VI six months later. However, McCartney first intended to make it a single. Retrospectively, the song has received mixed reception from critics and historians. Some have praised "Every Little Thing" as one of the most underrated tracks on the album and in the band's catalogue, and others have dismissed it as simplistic filler with weak lyrics. In retrospective rankings of the Beatles' catalogue, the song has consistently placed in the lower half. Several covers have been released, such as Yes' 1969 hard rock version.

== Background and inspiration ==
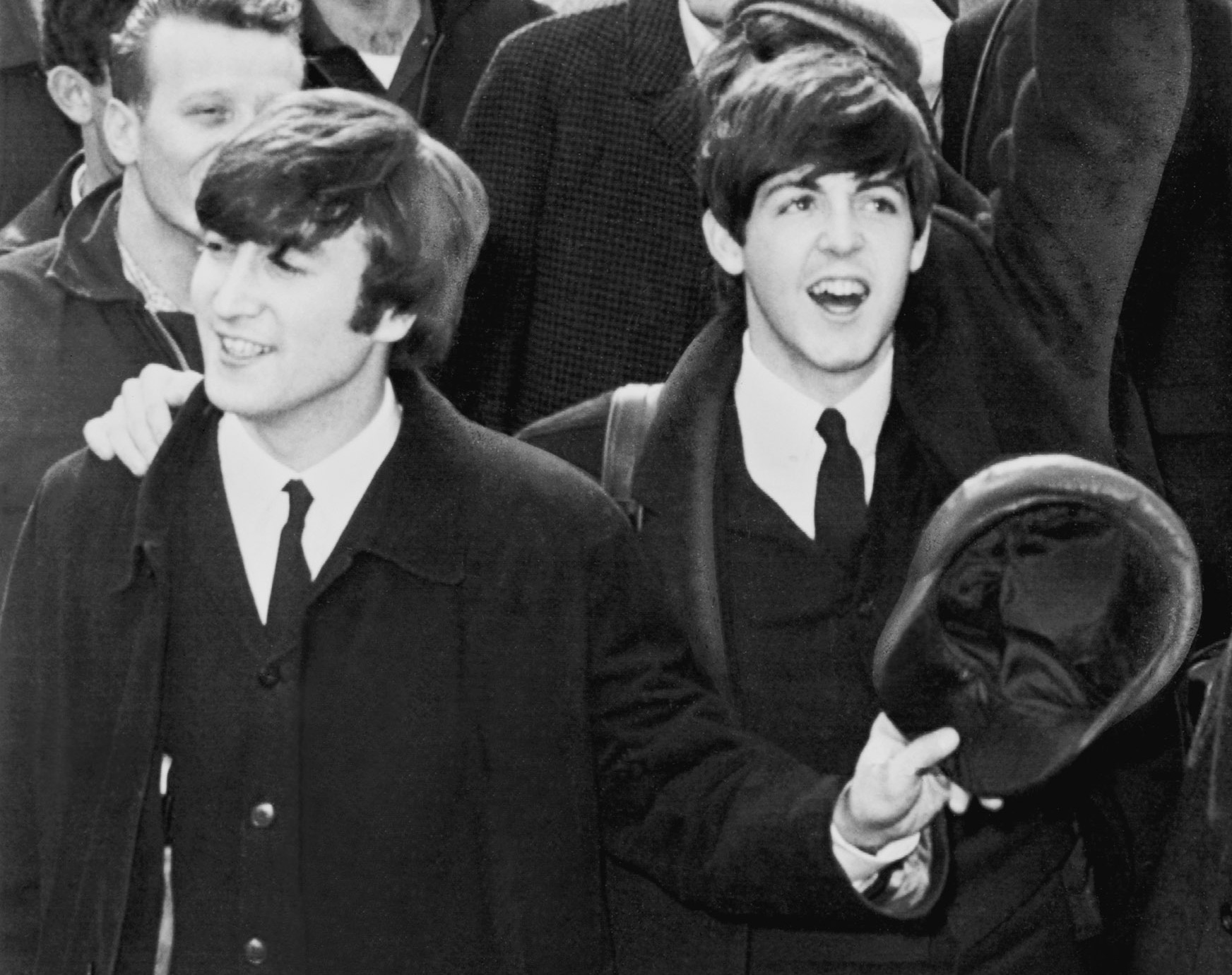
"Every Little Thing" was credited to Lennon–McCartney (pictured in 1964), although Lennon (left) asserted that McCartney wrote the bulk of the song.

Paul McCartney said "Every Little Thing", as with many other songs, was composed in his then-girlfriend Jane Asher's home. It was specifically in the "little music room", a workspace lacking distractions or "comfortable" armchairs to keep him focused on his writing. It has been speculated that the song was inspired by Asher, but this has never been confirmed. Although the song is credited to the Lennon–McCartney songwriting partnership, John Lennon noted that he only helped to write a minor part of it, asserting that it was "[McCartney's] song". Some sources, such as All The Songs: The Story Behind Every Beatles Release and Way Beyond Compare: The Beatles' Recorded Legacy, have claimed the song originated in Atlantic City, New Jersey, where the Beatles had stopped over in August 1964 during a tour; they cite an interview with McCartney from that same year. Author John Winn concludes that he could have begun composing it in London and finished it in Atlantic City. Rolling Stone magazine agrees, speculating that Lennon "added finishing touches" to McCartney's work in Atlantic City.

== Composition ==
"Every Little Thing" is a pop rock song. Musicologist John Covack argues that its style possibly borrows from Bob Dylan's, particularly in light of the Beatles' meeting with Dylan several weeks before the song was recorded. Lyrically, the song centres on the idea of "eternal love". According to musicologists, this theme hearkened back to many of the Beatles' love-themed songs issued that year.

The song is in common time and set in the key of A major. Its chorus has a vocal harmony that widens from an interval of a third to a fifth in the title line, held together by Ringo Starr striking the timpani. With "Every Little Thing", the Beatles use an ABAB musical structure, hinging on clearly defined verses and choruses rather than a traditional AABA form.

The song builds up tension from simple harmonies without recoursing to a middle eight, according to music critic Ian MacDonald. He deems the track's musical traits a blend of what McCartney and Lennon were known for when writing, noting Lennon's presence in the chorus's major seconds. He also felt McCartney had a clear influence on the wide intervals in the verse and chorus, with the chorus holding onto the tonic before falling to a flat seventh chord over Starr's timpani playing. Alan W. Pollack, a musicologist, describes its structure as a hybrid that switches between double verses with three refrains—something unusual for the Beatles; said structure is broken up by a single verse guitar solo. He adds that the two-bar guitar introduction starts on the second beat, not the first, confusing the listener's sense of metre until the main verse establishes the actual metre. Pollack feels that the melody is similar to a Mixolydian mode because it combines a natural major third with a flattened seventh degree. Additionally, he notes that the vocal harmonies in the song's fade out render the final chord a "tangy" E9.

== Recording ==
The song was recorded while the band was working on their fourth studio album, Beatles for Sale. During this time, Lennon and McCartney's productivity as songwriters had started to struggle due to the band's touring commitments. McCartney saw in the song a chance to create the Beatles' next single. The band first performed "Every Little Thing" for their manager Brian Epstein along with a group of people Epstein had assembled to hear new songs the band had prepared. Despite McCartney thinking it deserved to be a single, Epstein chose to add it to Beatles for Sale. The way he saw it, the song did not have "what was required" to be anything more than "album filler". "I Feel Fine" was instead selected for the single.

"Every Little Thing", produced by George Martin, was recorded in nine takes, starting with four takes on 29 September 1964 and followed by five more the next day. It was the first song the Beatles recorded after returning from their North American tour. The band deemed the fourth take adequate, and they decided to improve upon it further. One of the subsequent takes was discarded after McCartney burped during it, and another ended with the Beatles laughing uproariously. Lennon performed lead vocals on the verses, with McCartney providing vocal harmony on the refrains. In order to add a double "boom" during the song's chorus to punctuate the lyrics, Starr, who also played drums on the recording, pounded on a timpani. George Harrison reportedly missed the first recording session but was present for all the others. Mono and stereo mixing for the song was completed on 27 October 1964. A guitar intro along with timpani and piano parts, the latter played by McCartney, were overdubbed onto the ninth take.

Early takes show the arrangement was made to be simplified in the studio. McCartney originally sang an unused descant line in parallel thirds above Lennon, and Harrison's 12-string electric guitar part initially featured a countermelody, before the role was taken over by McCartney and his Steinway piano overdub. Beatles historians debate who played specific guitar parts on the track. In their respective line-ups, MacDonald, Kenneth Womack, and Winn credit Harrison with lead guitar on a Rickenbacker 12-string and Lennon with acoustic rhythm guitar. Winn further asserts that Harrison played lead on both the basic track and overdubs. However, other sources suggest Lennon played rhythm on his electric Rickenbacker 325 12-string, or that McCartney contributed the song's lead motifs.

== Release and reception ==
EMI's Parlophone label released "Every Little Thing" in the United Kingdom on 4 December 1964, appearing on side two of Beatles for Sale between a cover of "Honey Don't" and "I Don't Want to Spoil the Party". In the United States, Capitol Records issued the track on 14 June 1965 as the last song on Beatles VI. It later featured on the 1977 compilation album Love Songs, and takes six and seven were released on Anthology 4 on 21 November 2025.

MacDonald, in his book Revolution in the Head: The Beatles' Records and the Sixties, highlighted the track as one of the most emotional on the album. While he noted that its message of a woman doing things only for "her man" would likely be scrutinised in an age of political correctness, he found that no "hint of male supremacy" in the lyrics. He also asserted that the exact chords it is played in were performed "so perfectly" that it helped to enhance the song and its themes greatly. Author Hunter Davies dismissed the song as "highly forgettable", for a beat he considered lacklustre, and lyrics he described as "poor". He mainly condemned what he felt was the song's overall message: that a woman is expected to "serve her man". Journalist Mark Hertsgaard critiqued the track as another piece of "unremarkable material" on Beatles for Sale but praised Lennon for making it sound "richer" with his lead vocals, and McCartney for his vocal harmony.

Em Casalena of American Songwriter hailed "Every Little Thing" as "underrated", calling it a "special" song off the album, particularly for being a much softer tune penned largely by McCartney and sung by Lennon. Considering it to be McCartney's most "melodramatic" track on Beatles for Sale, Pitchfork critic Tom Ewing called the song "splendid", positively comparing it's musical style to that of the Shangri-Las. Musician Matthew Caws, the lead vocalist and guitarist of Nada Surf, selected "Every Little Thing" as his pick for an example of a "perfect song". He particularly appreciated the contrast between the joyful lyrics and emotional melody, which gave it "depth". Mark Beaumont of NME shared a similar sentiment about the differing lyrics and melody, listing the track in the 129th spot of his ranking of every Beatles song. AllMusic critic Richie Unterberger considered the track to be one of the better examples of "first-rate" filler on the album, appreciating the upbeat, folksy melody. He singled out the solo during the instrumental break as one of its most memorable aspects.

Ranking every Beatles song from worst to best, Ultimate Classic Rock critic Michael Gallucci placed "Every Little Thing" in the 189th spot. Gallucci highlighted how, despite not being their greatest work, it still "breaks away from some pop conventions" in a way he admired. Rolling Stone named "Every Little Thing" the 91st greatest Beatles song, noting how the song was unique for the band at time, being written by someone who was not the lead singer. Bill Wyman of Vulture listed it as the 198th best in his ranking; he considered the vocals and drum sounds to be poor but found some bits of melody noteworthy enough.

== Cover versions ==
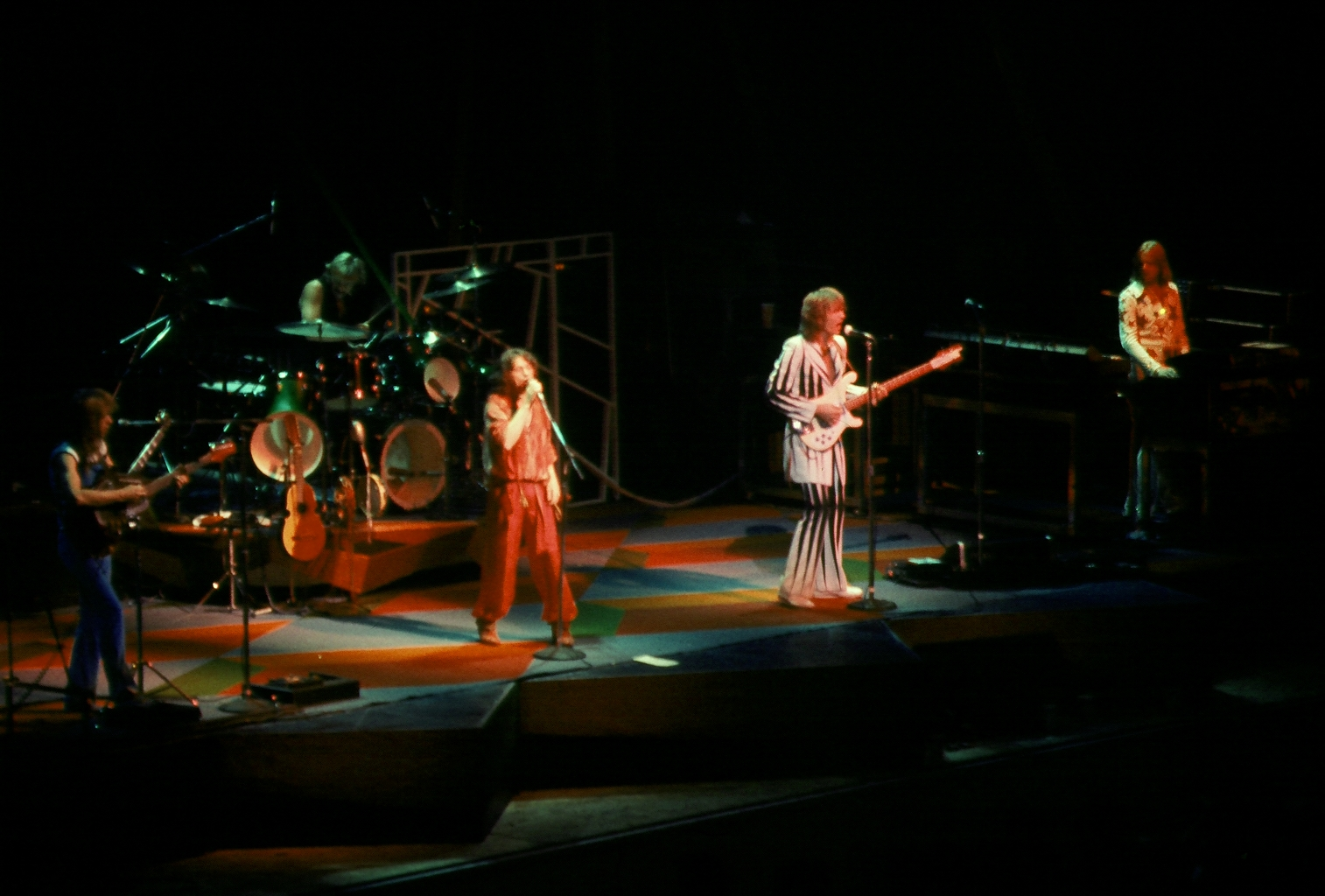
Yes (pictured in 1977) released a cover of "Every Little Thing" in 1969.

The English progressive rock band Yes covered "Every Little Thing" in 1969 for their self-titled debut album. In Unterberger's view, the cover is "far heavier" than the original and leans much more into a hard rock sound. He writes that Yes' rendition is one of the most famous covers of a lesser-known Beatles song. It also incorporates parts of other Beatles tracks, such as the guitar riff from "Day Tripper" (1965). Lou Ann Barton, an American blues singer, performed a version of the song on her EP Forbidden Tones. In 2006, Barbara Dickson covered the song for her Beatles-tribute album Nothing's Gonna Change My World.

== Personnel ==
According to Ian MacDonald and Kenneth Womack:

- John Lennon – lead vocal and vocal harmony, acoustic guitar
- Paul McCartney – lead vocal, bass, piano
- George Harrison – double-tracked lead guitar
- Ringo Starr – drums, timpani
