= List of Yes band members =

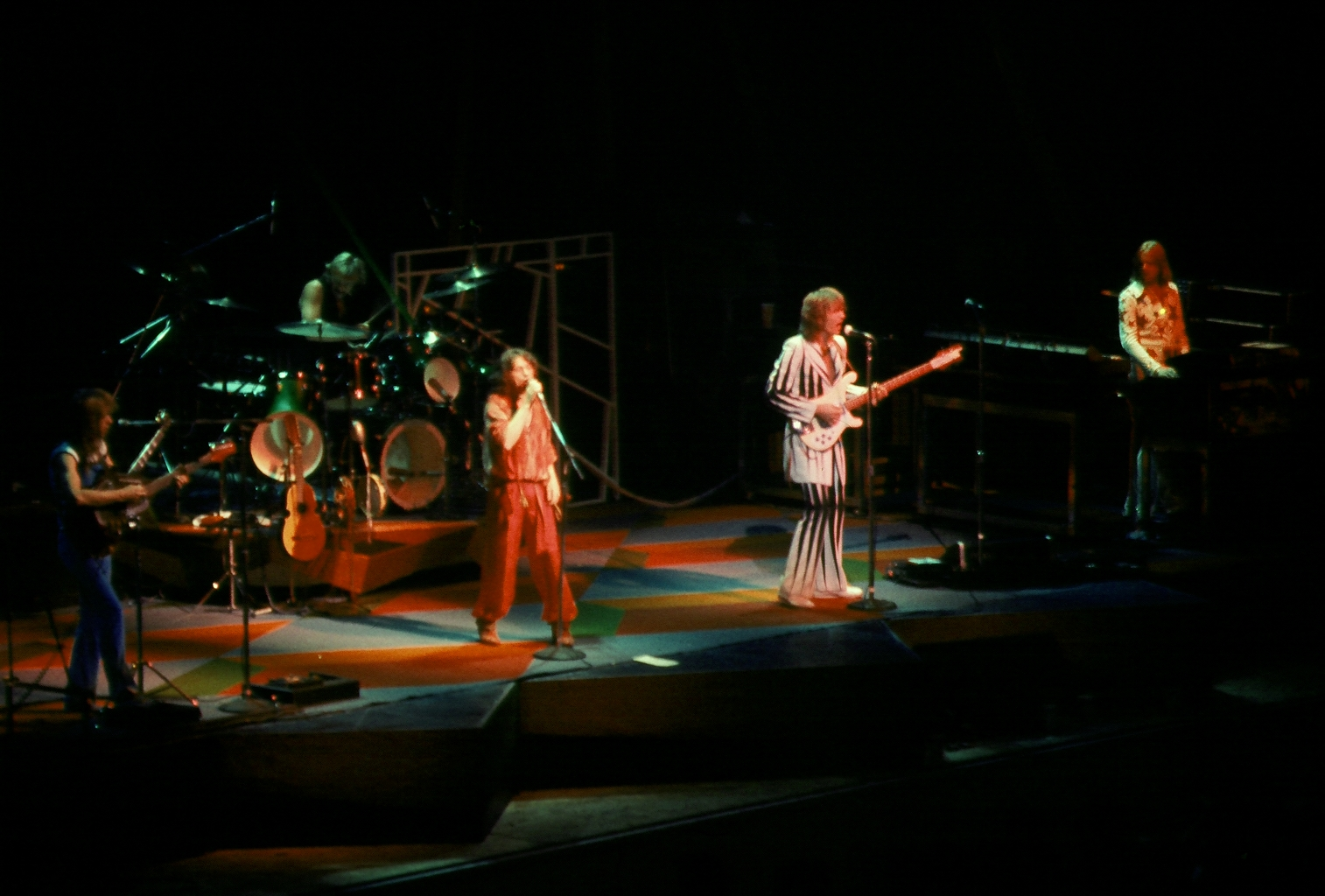
(left to right) Steve Howe, Alan White, Jon Anderson, Chris Squire and Rick Wakeman

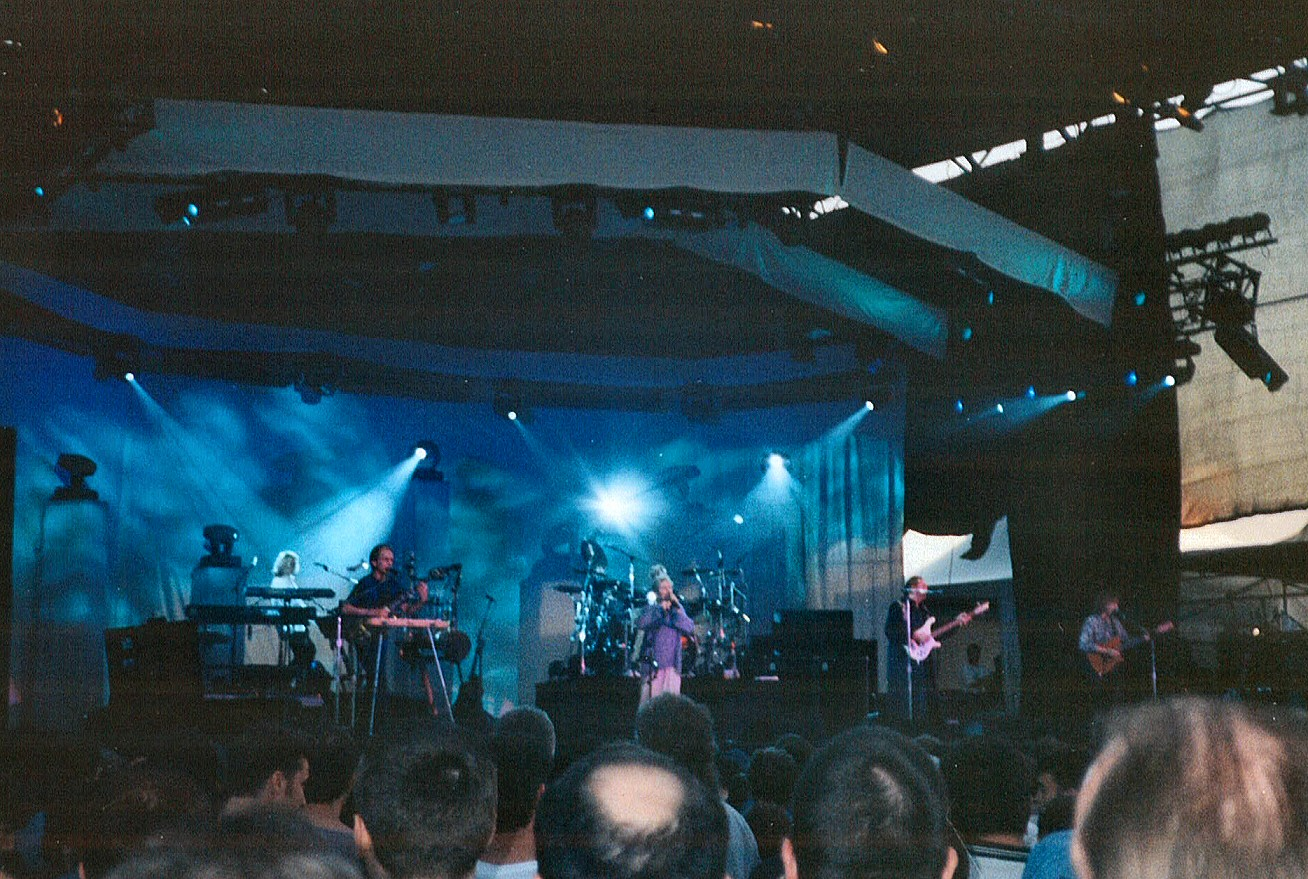
(left to right) Igor Khoroshev, Steve Howe, Alan White (obscured), Jon Anderson, Chris Squire and Billy Sherwood

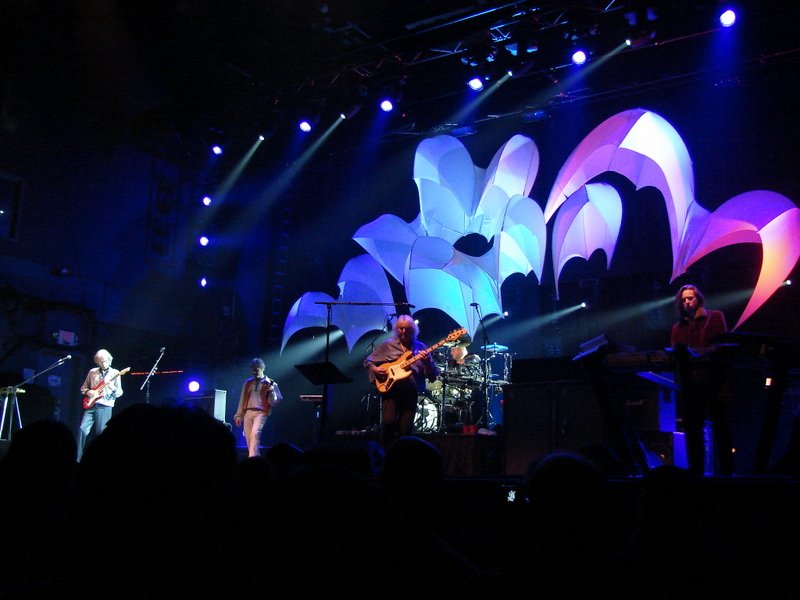
(left to right) Steve Howe, Benoit David, Chris Squire, Alan White and Oliver Wakeman

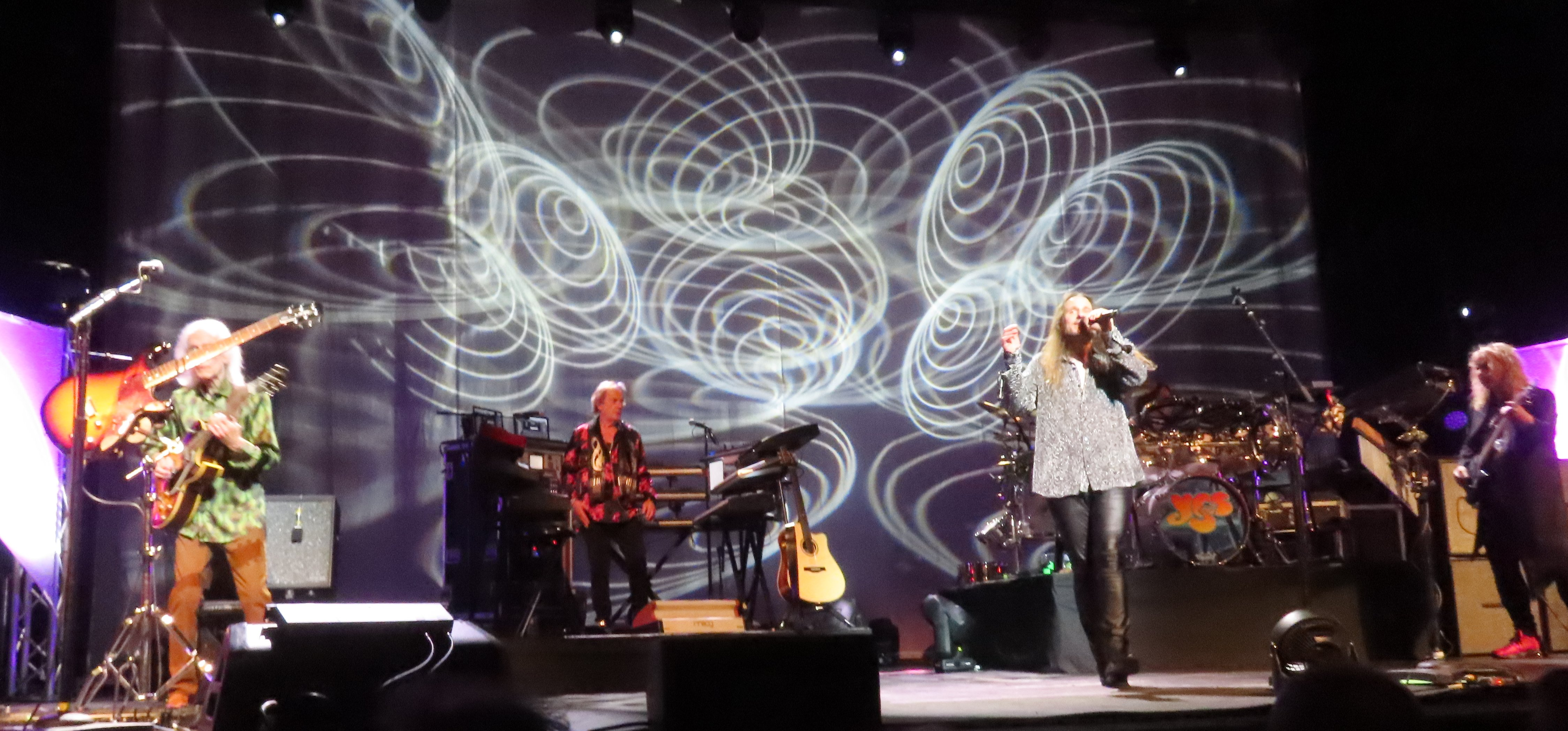
(left to right) Steve Howe, Geoff Downes, Jon Davison, Jay Schellen (on drums) and Billy Sherwood.

Four lineups of Yes performing in 1977, 1998, 2008 and 2024.

Yes are an English progressive rock band founded in 1968 by lead singer Jon Anderson, bassist Chris Squire, guitarist Peter Banks, keyboardist Tony Kaye, and drummer Bill Bruford. The band's current line-up includes guitarist Steve Howe (who first joined in 1970), keyboardist Geoff Downes (who first joined in 1980), bassist Billy Sherwood (since 2015, formerly guitarist/keyboardist, who first joined in 1994 as a touring member, and as official member in 1997), lead singer Jon Davison (since 2012) and drummer Jay Schellen (who first joined in 2016 as touring member, and as official member since 2023).

== History ==
=== 1968–1981 ===
The band formed out of psychedelic rock band Mabel Greer's Toyshop in 1968, with the line-up of Anderson, Squire, Banks, Kaye and Bruford. In September, Bruford decided to quit performing to study at the University of Leeds. His replacement, Tony O'Reilly of the Koobas, struggled to perform with the rest of the group on stage and former Warriors and future King Crimson drummer Ian Wallace subbed for one gig on 5 November 1968. After Bruford was refused a year's sabbatical leave from Leeds, Anderson and Squire convinced him to return for Yes's supporting slot for Cream's farewell concert at the Royal Albert Hall on 26 November.

This line-up released two albums, Yes and Time and a Word, the latter of which included a 20-piece youth orchestra. Banks left the group on 18 April 1970, just three months before the album's release. Having expressed dissatisfaction with the idea of recording with an orchestra, Banks later indicated that he was fired by Anderson and Squire, and that Kaye and Bruford had no prior knowledge that it would be happening. Banks' replacement was Tomorrow guitarist Steve Howe, who appears in the photograph of the group on the American issue despite not having played on it. This line-up released The Yes Album, friction arose between Howe and Kaye on tour; this, along with Kaye's reported reluctance to play the Mellotron and the Minimoog synthesizer, preferring to stick exclusively to piano and Hammond organ, led to the keyboardist being fired from the band in the summer of 1971. At the time of Kaye's departure, Yes had already found their new keyboardist, Rick Wakeman, a classically trained player who had left the folk rock group Strawbs earlier in the year.

Fragile, was recorded by the new line-up and was released in November 1971, followed by Close to the Edge in September 1972. The growing critical and commercial success of the band was not enough to retain Bruford, who left Yes in the summer of 1972, before the album's release, to join King Crimson. The band considered several possible replacements, including Aynsley Dunbar (who was playing with Frank Zappa at the time), and decided on former Plastic Ono Band drummer Alan White, a friend of Anderson and Offord who had once sat in with the band weeks before Bruford's departure.

Wakeman left the band after the 1973–1974 tour; his solo album Journey to the Centre of the Earth topped the UK charts in May 1974. Several musicians were approached to replace Wakeman, including Vangelis Papathanassiou, Eddie Jobson of Roxy Music and former Atlantis/Cat Stevens keyboardist Jean Roussel. Howe says he also asked Keith Emerson, who did not want to leave Emerson, Lake & Palmer. Yes ultimately chose Swiss keyboardist Patrick Moraz of Refugee, who arrived in August 1974 during the recording sessions for Relayer.

In late 1976, the band travelled to Switzerland and started recording for their album Going for the One. It was then that Anderson sent early versions of "Going for the One" and "Wonderous Stories" to Wakeman, who felt he could contribute to such material better than the band's past releases. Moraz was let go, after Wakeman was booked, initially on a session musician basis. Upon its release in July 1977, Going for the One topped the UK album charts for two weeks.

After internal tensions, Anderson and Wakeman left Yes in early 1980. Their replacements were keyboardist Geoff Downes and singer Trevor Horn of the Buggles. After releasing Drama and touring in support of it, the group disbanded in March 1981.

=== 1983–2004 ===
At the beginning of 1982, Phil Carson of Atlantic Records introduced Squire and White to guitarist and singer Trevor Rabin, who had initially made his name with the South African supergroup Rabbitt, subsequently releasing three solo albums, working as a record producer and even briefly considering being a member of Asia. The three teamed up in a new band called Cinema, for which Squire also recruited the original Yes keyboard player Tony Kaye. Later in 1982, Cinema entered the studio to record their debut album. Although Rabin and Squire initially shared lead vocals for the project, Trevor Horn was briefly brought into Cinema as a potential singer, but soon opted to become the band's producer instead.

Horn worked well with the band. However, his clashes with Tony Kaye (complicated by the fact that Rabin was playing most of the keyboards during the recording sessions) led to Kaye's departure during the recording, though some of his playing was kept on the final album and he had returned by the time it was released. Meanwhile, Squire encountered Jon Anderson (who, since leaving Yes, had released two solo albums and had success with the Jon and Vangelis project) at a Los Angeles party and played him the Cinema demo tracks. Anderson was invited into the project as lead singer and joined in April 1983 during the last few weeks of the sessions, having comparatively little creative input beyond adding his lead vocals and re-writing some lyrics.

At the suggestion of record company executives, Cinema then changed their name to Yes in June 1983. Yes released their comeback album 90125 in November 1983. Yes began recording for their twelfth album, Big Generator, in 1985, initially with Trevor Horn returning as producer. The sessions underwent many starts and stops due to the use of multiple recording locations in Italy, London and Los Angeles, with interpersonal problems leading to Horn leaving the sessions partway through, all of which kept the album from timely completion (the album was intended for a 1986 release, but by the end of that year it was still incomplete). Eventually Rabin took over final production. The album was released in September 1987.

By the end of 1988, Anderson felt creatively sidelined by Rabin and Squire and had grown tired of the musical direction of the "Yes-West" lineup. He took leave of the band, asserting that he would never stay in Yes purely for the money, and started work in Montserrat on a solo project that eventually involved Wakeman, Howe and Bruford. This collaboration led to suggestions that there would be some kind of reformation of the "classic" Yes, although from the start the project had included bass player Tony Levin, whom Bruford had worked with in King Crimson. The project, rather than taking over or otherwise using the Yes name, was called Anderson Bruford Wakeman Howe (ABWH). Their eponymous album, released in June 1989. ABWH toured in 1989 and 1990 as "An Evening of Yes Music" which featured Levin, keyboardist Julian Colbeck, and guitarist Milton McDonald as support musicians. A live album and home video were recorded and released in 1993, both titled An Evening of Yes Music Plus that featured Jeff Berlin on bass due to Levin suffering from illness.

Following the tour, the group returned to the recording studio to produce their second album, tentatively called Dialogue. After hearing the tracks, Arista Records refused to release the album as they felt the initial mixes were weak. The "Yes-West" group were working on a follow-up to Big Generator and had been shopping around for a new singer, auditioning Roger Hodgson of Supertramp, Steve Walsh of Kansas, Robbie Nevil of "C'est la Vie" fame, and Billy Sherwood of World Trade. Walsh only spent one day with them, but Sherwood and the band worked well enough together and continued with writing sessions. Arista suggested that the "Yes-West" group, with Anderson on vocals, record four songs to add to the new AWBH album which would then be released under the Yes name. Union was released in April 1991 and is the thirteenth studio album from Yes. Each group played their own songs, with Anderson singing on all tracks. Squire sang background vocals on a few of the ABWH tracks, with Tony Levin playing all the bass on those songs. The album does not feature all eight members playing at once. Almost the entire band have openly stated their dislike of Union. Bruford has disowned the album entirely, and Wakeman was reportedly unable to recognise any of his keyboard work in the final edit and threw his copy of the album out of his limousine. The 1991–1992 Union tour united all eight members on a revolving circular stage. Following the tour's conclusion in 1992, Bruford chose not to remain involved with Yes and returned to his jazz project Earthworks. Howe also ceased his involvement with the band at this time.

The next Yes studio album, as with Union, was masterminded by a record company, rather than by the band itself. Victory Music approached Rabin with a proposal to produce an album solely with the 90125 lineup. Rabin initially countered by requesting that Wakeman also be included. Rabin began assembling the album at his home, using the then-pioneering concept of a digital home studio, and used material written by himself and Anderson. The new album was well into production in 1993, but Wakeman's involvement had finally been cancelled, as his refusal to leave his long-serving management created insuperable legal problems. Talk was released in March 1994 and is the band's fourteenth studio release. The 1994 tour included sideman Billy Sherwood on additional keyboards and guitar.

In November 1995, Anderson, Squire and White resurrected the "classic" 1970s lineup of Yes by inviting Wakeman and Howe back to the band, the Keys to Ascension album included three live shows at the Fremont Theater in San Luis Obispo, California which were recorded and released, along with the new studio tracks. The Keys to Ascension 2 included the same formatting. Disgruntled at the way a potential studio album had been sacrificed in favour of the Keys to Ascension releases, Wakeman left the group again. With Yes in disarray again, Squire turned to Billy Sherwood (by now the band's engineer) for help. Sherwood's integral involvement with the writing, production, and performance of the music led to his finally joining Yes as a full member (taking on the role of harmony singer, keyboardist and second guitarist). The results of the sessions were released in November 1997 as the seventeenth Yes studio album, Open Your Eyes For the 1997/1998 Open Your Eyes tour, Yes hired Russian keyboard player Igor Khoroshev, who had played on some of the album tracks. By the time the band came to record their eighteenth studio album The Ladder with producer Bruce Fairbairn, Khoroshev had become a full-time member (with Sherwood now concentrating on songwriting, vocal arrangements and second guitar). The Ladder was released in September 1999, peaking at number 36 in the UK and number 99 in the U.S. While on tour, Khoroshev was involved in a backstage incident of sexual assault with a female security guard at Nissan Pavilion in Bristow, Virginia on 23 July 2000 and parted company with the band at the end of the tour.

Following the departures of Sherwood and Khoroshev and the death of Fairbairn, Yes once again set about reinventing themselves, this time choosing to record without a keyboardist, opting instead to include a 60-piece orchestra conducted by Larry Groupé. The result was their nineteenth studio album, 2001's Magnification. The Yes Symphonic Tour ran from July to December 2001 and had the band performing on stage with an orchestra and American keyboardist Tom Brislin. Their two shows in Amsterdam, in November, were recorded for their 2002 DVD and 2009 CD release Symphonic Live. The band invited Wakeman to play with them for the filming, but he was on a solo tour at the time.

Following Wakeman's announcement of his return in April 2002, Yes embarked on their Full Circle Tour in 2002–2003 that included their first performances in Australia since 1973. In 2004, Squire, Howe and White reunited for one night only with former members Trevor Rabin (guitar and vocals) and Geoff Downes (keyboards) during a show celebrating Trevor Horn's career, performing three Yes songs. The show video was released in DVD in 2008 under the name Trevor Horn and Friends: Slaves to the Rhythm. After their 35th Anniversary Tour, Yes described themselves as "on hiatus". Howe recalls this break as very much welcomed by the band due to the heavy touring of the previous year and a half, and in his opinion necessary.

=== 2009–present ===
In May 2008, a fortieth-anniversary Close to the Edge and Back Tour—which was to feature Oliver Wakeman on keyboards—was announced. The tour was abruptly cancelled prior to rehearsals, after Anderson suffered an asthma attack and was diagnosed with acute respiratory failure, and was advised by doctors to avoid touring for six months. In September 2008, the remaining three members, eager to resume touring regardless of Anderson's availability, announced a tour billed as Steve Howe, Chris Squire and Alan White of Yes, with Oliver Wakeman on keyboards and new lead singer Benoît David, a Canadian musician who'd previously played with Mystery and with Yes tribute band Close to the Edge.

The In the Present Tour started in November 2008, but it was cut short in the following February when Squire required emergency surgery on an aneurysm in his leg. Touring resumed in June 2009. In October 2009, Squire declared that the new lineup from the In the Present Tour "is now Yes", and the tour, with the band now billed as Yes, continued through 2010. Their 2010 studio sessions would yield material eventually to be released as From a Page.

In August 2010, it was announced that new material had been written for Fly from Here, Yes's twentieth studio album. Yes then signed a deal with Frontiers Records and began recording in Los Angeles with Trevor Horn serving as producer. Much of the album material was extrapolated from a pair of songs written by Horn and Geoff Downes around the time that they had been Yes members during 1980 and the Drama album. During the recording sessions, the band thought it would be wise to bring Downes back to replace Oliver Wakeman on keyboards.

In February 2012, after David contracted a respiratory illness, he was replaced by Glass Hammer singer Jon Davison. Davison was recommended to Squire by their common friend Taylor Hawkins, drummer for the Foo Fighters. Davison would join Yes to complete the band's scheduled dates across the year.

On 7 March 2013, founding guitarist Peter Banks died of heart failure.

Heaven & Earth, the band's twenty-first studio album and first with Davison, was recorded between January and March 2014, Roy Thomas Baker as producer and former band member Billy Sherwood as engineer on backing vocals and mixer. To promote Heaven & Earth, Yes resumed touring between July and November 2014. In May 2015, news of Squire's diagnosis with acute erythroid leukaemia was made public. This resulted in former guitarist Billy Sherwood replacing him for their 2015 summer North American tour with Toto between August–September, and their third annual Cruise to the Edge voyage in November, while Squire was receiving treatment. His condition deteriorated soon after, and he died on 27 June at his home in Phoenix, Arizona. Downes first announced Squire's death on Twitter. Squire asked White and Sherwood to continue the legacy of the band.

In January 2016, former Yes members Anderson, Rabin and Wakeman announced their new group, Anderson, Rabin and Wakeman (ARW), something that had been in the works for the previous six years. Their first tour, An Evening of Yes Music and More, began in October 2016 and lasted for one year with drummer Lou Molino III and bassist Lee Pomeroy. Following Yes's induction into the Rock and Roll Hall of Fame, the band renamed themselves Yes Featuring Jon Anderson, Trevor Rabin, Rick Wakeman. After a four-month tour in 2018 to celebrate the fiftieth anniversary of Yes, the group disbanded. Meanwhile, Howe & White's ongoing Yes lineup performed Fragile and Drama in their entirety on their April–June, 2016 European tour. Trevor Horn was a guest vocalist for two UK shows, singing "Tempus Fugit".

White missed the Summer 2016 tour to recover from back surgery; he was replaced by American drummer Jay Schellen. Dylan Howe, Steve's son, had originally been asked to be White's standby, but was prevented from being involved by visa problems. White returned on a part-time basis in November for their 2016 Japanese tour; until the following February, Schellen continued to sit in for White on most shows, with White playing on some songs. Yes toured the U.S. and Canada with the Yestival Tour from August to September 2017, performing at least one song from each album from Yes to Drama. Dylan Howe joined the band as a second drummer.

In February 2018, Yes headlined Cruise to the Edge involving original keyboardist Tony Kaye as a special guest, his first performances with the band since 1994. A U.S. leg in June and July also included guest performances from Kaye, Horn, Tom Brislin and Patrick Moraz, who had last performed with Yes in 1976. The tour culminated with a Japanese leg in February 2019. Schellen continued to play as a second drummer to support White, who had a bacterial infection in his joints from November 2017.

Yes worked on new material for their twenty-second studio album The Quest, from late 2019 through 2021, with Howe as the sole producer. On 22 May 2022, Yes announced that White would sit out of their upcoming tour due to health issues and that Schellen would play drums. White died on 26 May. The band kicked off a tour in June 2022 to commemorate the 50th anniversary of Close to the Edge. They had originally planned to resume their Album Series Tour with a European leg featuring Relayer performed in its entirety, before the dates were rescheduled for 2023 and the program changed. A tribute concert for White was held in Seattle on 2 October, featuring special guests and former Yes guitarist Trevor Rabin. In February, Schellen joined the band as a permanent member. On 10 March 2023, Yes announced their new studio album, Mirror to the Sky.

== Members ==
=== Current members ===
Image	Name	Years active	Instruments	Occasional instruments	Release contributions
	Steve Howe	1970–1981; 1988–1991 (ABWH); 1990–1992; 1995–present	guitar; backing vocals; lap steel; pedal steel guitar	lead vocals; laud; mandolin; bass guitar; sitar; banjo	all Yes releases from The Yes Album (1971) to Yesshows (1980); Union (1991); Yes: Live – 1975 at Q.P.R. (1993); all Yes releases from Live in Philadelphia (1995) onward
	Geoff Downes	1980–1981; 2011–present (one off show in 2004)	keyboards	vocoder; programming	Drama (1980); The Word Is Live (2005); all new Yes releases from Fly from Here (2011) onward
	Billy Sherwood	1991 (session); 1994 (touring); 1997–2000; 2015–present	bass; keyboards; guitar; backing vocals	lead vocals; timpani; harmonica	all Yes releases from Open Your Eyes (1997) to House of Yes: Live from House of Blues (2000); all new Yes releases from Topographic Drama – Live Across America (2017) onward; Non-member contributions: Union (1991) (keyboards, guitar, bass); Keys to Ascension (1996) (mixer); Keys to Ascension 2 (1997) (producer, mixer); Heaven & Earth (2014) (mixer, engineer)
	Jon Davison	2012–present	lead vocals; acoustic guitar; percussion	keyboards	all new Yes releases from Heaven & Earth (2014) onward
	Jay Schellen	2016–2017; 2018–2023 (touring) (Note: Schellen covered for Alan White when the drummer could not tour due to health issues in 2016 and stayed when the drummer made a recovery and performed alongside him. Following White's death in 2022, Schellen officially replaced him.); 2023–present	drums; percussion	backing vocals	Topographic Drama – Live Across America (2017); 50 Live (2019); The Quest (2021) (as session percussionist); Mirror to the Sky (2023); Aurora (2026)

=== Former members ===
Image	Name	Years active	Instruments	Occasional instruments	Release contributions
	Chris Squire	1968–1981; 1983–2004; 2009–2015 (his death)	bass; backing vocals	piano; harmonica; bass pedals; timpani; lead vocals	all Yes releases from Yes (1969) to Like It Is: Yes at the Mesa Arts Center (2015)
	Jon Anderson	1968–1980; 1983–1988; 1988–1991 (ABWH); 1990–2004; 2010–2018 (ARW) (one off show in 2017)	lead vocals; guitar; percussion; harp	keyboards; cuatro; flute	all Yes releases from Yes (1969) to Tormato (1978); Yesshows (1980); all Yes releases from 90125 (1983) to The Lost Broadcasts (2009); Union Live (2011); Progeny: Seven Shows from Seventy-Two (2015)
	Tony Kaye	1968–1971; 1983; 1983–1995 (touring guest 2018–2019)	organ; piano	moog; backing vocals	all Yes releases from Yes (1969) to The Yes Album (1971); all Yes releases from 90125 (1983) to Talk (1994); Something's Coming: The BBC Recordings 1969–1970 (1997); The Word Is Live (2005); The Lost Broadcasts (2009); Union Live (2011); Yes 50 Live (2019)
	Peter Banks	1968–1970 (died 2013)	guitar; backing vocals	none	Yes (1969); Time and a Word (1970); Something's Coming: The BBC Recordings 1969–1970 (1997); The Word Is Live (2005); The Lost Broadcasts (2009)
	Bill Bruford	1968; 1968–1972; 1988–1991 (ABWH); 1990–1992	drums; percussion	vibraphone	all Yes releases from Yes (1969) to Yessongs (1973); Union (1991); Something's Coming: The BBC Recordings 1969–1970 (1997); The Word Is Live (2005); The Lost Broadcasts (2009); Union Live (2011)
	Tony O'Reilly	1968	drums; percussion	none	
	Rick Wakeman	1971–1974; 1976–1980; 1988–1991 (ABWH); 1990–1992; 1995–1996; 2002–2004; 2010–2018 (ARW) (one off show in 2017)	keyboards	percussion	all Yes releases from Fragile (1971) to Tales from Topographic Oceans (1973); Going for the One (1977); Tormato (1978); Yesshows (1980); Union (1991); Keys to Ascension (1996); Keys to Ascension 2 (1997); The Word Is Live (2005); Live at Montreux 2003 (2007); Union Live (2011); Progeny: Seven Shows from Seventy-Two (2015)
	Alan White	1972–1981; 1983–2022 (his death)	drums; percussion; backing vocals	piano; synthesizers	all new Yes releases from Yessongs (1973) to The Quest (2021) except Something's Coming: The BBC Recordings 1969–1970 (1997) and The Lost Broadcasts (2009)
	Patrick Moraz	1974–1976 (touring guest 2018–2019)	keyboards	none	Relayer (1974); Yesshows (1980); Yes: Live – 1975 at Q.P.R. (1993); The Word Is Live (2005); Yes 50 Live (2019)
	Trevor Horn	1980–1981 (studio guest 2018)	lead vocals	bass; guitar; percussion; keyboards	Drama (1980); The Word Is Live (2005); Non-member contributions: 90125 (1983) (producer, backing vocals); Big Generator (1987) (producer); Fly from Here (2011) (producer, keyboards, guitar, backing vocals); Fly from Here – Return Trip (2018) (producer, lead and backing vocals, additional keyboards, additional acoustic guitar)
	Trevor Rabin	1983–1995; 2010–2018 (ARW) (one off shows in 2004 and 2017)	guitar; backing and lead vocals; keyboards	programming	all Yes releases from 90125 (1983) to Talk (1994); The Word Is Live (2005); Union Live (2011)
	Eddie Jobson	1983	keyboards	none	
	Igor Khoroshev	1997–2000	keyboards	backing vocals	Open Your Eyes (1997); The Ladder (1999); House of Yes: Live from House of Blues (2000); Magnification (live bonus tracks from 2004 reissue) (2001)
	Benoît David	2009–2012	lead vocals	acoustic guitar; tambourine	Fly from Here (2011); In the Present – Live from Lyon (2011); From a Page (2019)
	Oliver Wakeman	2009–2011	keyboards	backing vocals	In the Present – Live from Lyon (2011); From a Page (2019); Non-member contributions: Fly from Here (2011) (keyboards)

=== Touring members ===
Image	Name	Years active	Instruments	Release contributions/notes
	Ian Wallace	1968 (one show) (died 2007)	drums	Wallace covered for Tony O'Reilly in 1968, Wallace had previously played with Jon Anderson in The Warriors.
	Casey Young	1984–1985	keyboards	9012Live: The Solos (1985); 9012Live (1985); The Word Is Live (2005); Young played with the band on their 90125 tour
	Milton McDonald	1988–1991 (ABWH)	rhythm guitar; backing vocals	McDonald and Levin joined Anderson Bruford Wakeman Howe in studio and on tour, Levin also played on Union (1991).
	Tony Levin	1988–1991 (ABWH)	bass; Chapman stick; backing vocals	McDonald and Levin joined Anderson Bruford Wakeman Howe in studio and on tour, Levin also played on Union (1991).
	Julian Colbeck	1989–1991 (ABWH)	additional keyboards; backing vocals	Colbeck joined ABWH on tour.
	Jeff Berlin	1989 (ABWH; American tour replacement after Levin fell ill)	bass; backing vocals	Berlin replaced Levin on an American tour, playing on An Evening of Yes Music Plus (1993)
	Kevin Kuhn	1993	bass; backing vocals	television performance promoting Symphonic Music of Yes on Live with Regis and Kathie Lee with Steve Howe and Bill Bruford.
	Tom Brislin	2001	keyboards; backing vocals	Symphonic Live (2002) (Note: Keitel, Brislin and the European Festival Orchestra joined the band on their Symphonic tour, Brislin performed on behalf of Rick Wakeman who was busy with his own tour at the time. The European Festival Orchestra just played on the European leg of touring, with local orchestral players playing on North American dates.)
	Wilhelm Keitel	2001	conductor	Symphonic Live (2002)
	European Festival Orchestra	2001	orchestra	Symphonic Live (2002)
	Lou Molino III	2016–2018 (ARW)	drums; percussion; backing vocals	Molino and Pomeroy joined Yes Featuring Jon Anderson, Trevor Rabin, Rick Wakeman on tour.
	Lee Pomeroy	2016–2018 (ARW)	bass; backing vocals	Molino and Pomeroy joined Yes Featuring Jon Anderson, Trevor Rabin, Rick Wakeman on tour.
	Iain Hornal	2017; 2018 (ARW; substitute)	bass; backing vocals	Hormal replaced Pomeroy when he was unavailable on a 2017 Japanese tour and a 2018 European tour.
	Dylan Howe	2017	drums	Steve Howe's son Dylan replaced Jay Schellen on additional drums duties in 2017.

== Session contributors ==
Image	Name	Years active	Instruments	Release contributions
	David Foster	1969–1970	backing vocals; acoustic guitar	Time and a Word (1970)
	Tony Cox	1969–1970	arranger; conductor	Time and a Word (1970)
	Royal College of Music students	1969–1970	orchestra	Time and a Word (1970)
	Colin Goldring	1970	recorder	The Yes Album (1971)
	Richard Williams Singers	1976–1977	choir	Going for the One (1977)
	Ars Laeta of Lausanne	1976–1977	choir	Going for the One (1977)
	Deepak Khazanchi	1982–1983	sitar; tampura	90125 (1983)
	Graham Preskett	1982–1983	violin	90125 (1983)
	Jimmy Zavala	1985–1987	harmonica; horns	Big Generator (1987)
	Lee R. Thornburg	1985–1987	horns	Big Generator (1987)
	Nick Lane	1985–1987	horns	Big Generator (1987)
	Greg Smith	1985–1987	horns	Big Generator (1987)
	Deborah Anderson	1988–1991	backing vocals	Anderson Bruford Wakeman Howe (1989); Union (1991)
	Tessa Niles	1988–1989 (ABWH)	backing vocals	Anderson Bruford Wakeman Howe (1989)
	Carol Kenyon	1988–1989 (ABWH)	backing vocals	Anderson Bruford Wakeman Howe (1989)
	Francis Dunnery	1988–1989 (ABWH)	backing vocals	Anderson Bruford Wakeman Howe (1989)
	Chris Kimsey	1988–1989 (ABWH)	backing vocals	Anderson Bruford Wakeman Howe (1989)
	Emerald Isle Community Singers, Montserrat	1988–1989 (ABWH)	backing vocals	Anderson Bruford Wakeman Howe (1989)
	Joe Hammer	1988–1989 (ABWH)	percussion programming	Anderson Bruford Wakeman Howe (1989)
	Matt Clifford	1988–1989 (ABWH)	keyboards; programming; orchestration; backing vocals	Anderson Bruford Wakeman Howe (1989)
	Steve Porcaro	1989–1991; 1997	synthesizer; keyboards	Union (1991); Open Your Eyes (1997)
	Jonathan Elias	1989–1991	keyboards; synthesizer; backing vocals	Union (1991)
	Jimmy Haun	1989–1991	electric guitar	Union (1991)
	Allan Schwartzberg	1989–1991	acoustic percussion	Union (1991)
	Gary Barlough	1989–1991	synthesiser	Union (1991)
	Jim Crichton	1989–1991	synthesiser	Union (1991)
	Sherman Foote	1989–1991	synthesiser	Union (1991)
	Chris Fosdick	1989–1991	synthesiser	Union (1991)
	Alex Lasarenko (died 2020)	1989–1991	synthesiser	Union (1991)
	Brian Foraker	1989–1991	synthesiser programming	Union (1991)
	Rory Kaplan	1989–1991	synthesiser programming	Union (1991)
	Jerry Bennett	1989–1991	synthesiser; synth percussion	Union (1991)
	Gary Falcone	1989–1991	backing vocals	Union (1991)
	Ian Lloyd	1989–1991	backing vocals	Union (1991)
	Tommy Funderburk	1989–1991	backing vocals	Union (1991)
	Danny Vaughn	1989–1991	backing vocals	Union (1991)
	Michael Sherwood (died 2019)	1989–1991	backing vocals	Union (1991)
	Randy Raine-Reusch	1999	tanbur; guzheng; ching cymbals; bullroarer; didjeridoo; percussion	The Ladder (1999)
	The Marguerita Horns: Tom Keenlyside (piccolo, saxophone); Derry Burns (trumpet); Rod Murray (trombone); Tom Colclough (saxophone) (died 2024); Neil Nicholson (tuba)	1999	horns	The Ladder (1999)
	Larry Groupé	2001	conductor	Magnification (2001)
	Gerard Johnson	2014	keyboards	Heaven & Earth (2014)
	FAMES Studio Orchestra	2021; 2022	orchestra	The Quest (2021); Mirror to the Sky (2023)
	Paul K. Joyce	2021; 2022	arranger	The Quest (2021); Mirror to the Sky (2023)
	Oleg Kondratenko	2021; 2022	conductor	The Quest (2021); Mirror to the Sky (2023)

== Line-ups ==
Period	Members	Releases
July – September 1968	Chris Squire – bass, backing vocals; Jon Anderson – lead vocals; Bill Bruford – drums, percussion; Peter Banks – guitars, backing vocals; Tony Kaye – keyboards	none – live performances
September – November 1968	Chris Squire – bass, backing vocals; Jon Anderson – lead vocals; Peter Banks – guitars, backing vocals; Tony Kaye – keyboards; Tony O'Reilly – drums	none – live performances
26 November 1968 – 18 April 1970	Chris Squire – bass, backing vocals; Jon Anderson – lead vocals, percussion; Peter Banks – guitars, backing vocals; Tony Kaye – keyboards; Bill Bruford – drums, percussion	Yes (1969); Time and a Word (1970); Yesyears (1991) [8 tracks]; Something's Coming: The BBC Recordings 1969–1970 (1997); In a Word: Yes (1969–) (2002) [8 tracks]; The Word Is Live (2005) [2 tracks]; The Lost Broadcasts (2009) [4 tracks]
April 1970 – summer 1971	Chris Squire – bass, backing vocals; Jon Anderson – lead vocals; Tony Kaye – keyboards; Bill Bruford – drums, percussion; Steve Howe – guitars, backing vocals	The Yes Album (1971); Yesyears (1991) [3 tracks]; In a Word: Yes (1969–) (2002) [5 tracks]; The Lost Broadcasts (2009) [4 tracks]
summer 1971 – July 1972	Chris Squire – bass, backing vocals; Jon Anderson – lead vocals; Bill Bruford – drums, percussion; Steve Howe – guitars, backing vocals; Rick Wakeman – keyboards	Fragile (1971); Close to the Edge (1972); Yessongs (1973) [2 tracks]; Yesyears (1991) [6 tracks]; In a Word: Yes (1969–) (2002) [7 tracks]; The Word Is Live (2005) [6 tracks]
July 1972 – May 1974	Chris Squire – bass, backing vocals; Jon Anderson – lead vocals; Steve Howe – guitars, backing vocals; Rick Wakeman – keyboards; Alan White – drums, percussion	Yessongs (1973) [11 tracks]; Tales from Topographic Oceans (1973); Yesyears (1991) [1 track]; In a Word: Yes (1969–) (2002) [1 track]; Progeny: Seven Shows from Seventy-Two (2015)
August 1974 – late 1976	Chris Squire – bass, backing vocals; Jon Anderson – lead vocals, rhythm guitar; Steve Howe – lead guitar, backing vocals; Alan White – drums, percussion; Patrick Moraz – keyboards	Relayer (1974); Yesshows (1980) [2 tracks]; Yesyears (1991) [3 tracks]; Yes: Live – 1975 at Q.P.R. (1993); In a Word: Yes (1969–) (2002) [2 tracks]; The Word Is Live (2005) [4 tracks]
late 1976 – early 1980	Chris Squire – bass, backing vocals; Jon Anderson – lead vocals, rhythm guitar; Steve Howe – lead guitar, backing vocals; Alan White – drums, percussion, backing vocals; Rick Wakeman – keyboards (initially session)	Going for the One (1977); Tormato (1978); Yesshows (1980) [6 tracks]; Yesyears (1991) [11 tracks]; Live in Philadelphia (1995); In a Word: Yes (1969–) (2002) [10 tracks]; The Word Is Live (2005) [7 tracks]
early 1980 – March 1981	Chris Squire – bass, backing vocals; Steve Howe – guitars, backing vocals; Alan White – drums, percussion, backing vocals; Geoff Downes – keyboards; Trevor Horn – lead vocals	Drama (1980); Yesyears (1991) [2 tracks]; In a Word: Yes (1969–) (2002) [2 tracks]; The Word Is Live (2005) [3 tracks]
1981–1983 disbanded
early 1982 – April 1983 (known as Cinema)	Chris Squire – bass, lead & backing vocals; Alan White – drums, percussion, backing vocals; Tony Kaye – keyboards; Trevor Rabin – guitars, lead & backing vocals, keyboards	90125 (1983) early sessions
April – mid 1983 (known as Cinema until June 1983)	Chris Squire – bass, backing & lead vocals; Alan White – drums, percussion, backing vocals, synthesizer; Trevor Rabin – guitars, lead & backing vocals, keyboards; Jon Anderson – lead vocals; Eddie Jobson – keyboards	none – rehearsals and some music videos only
mid 1983 – late 1988	Chris Squire – bass, backing & lead vocals; Alan White – drums, percussion, backing vocals, synthesizer; Trevor Rabin – guitars, lead & backing vocals, keyboards; Jon Anderson – lead vocals; Tony Kaye – keyboards; with: Casey Young – additional keyboards (offstage touring musician 1984–1985)	90125 (1983); 9012Live: The Solos (1985); 9012Live (1985); Big Generator (1987); Yesyears (1991) [8 tracks]; In a Word: Yes (1969–) (2002) [7 tracks]; The Word Is Live (2005) [4 tracks]
late 1988 – 1990	Chris Squire – bass, backing vocals; Alan White – drums, percussion, backing vocals; Trevor Rabin – guitars, lead & backing vocals, keyboards; Tony Kaye – keyboards	none – rehearsals and demos only
1990 – March 1992	Chris Squire – bass, backing & harmony vocals; Alan White – drums, percussion; Trevor Rabin – guitars, lead & backing vocals, keyboards; Tony Kaye – keyboards; Jon Anderson – lead vocals; Bill Bruford – drums; Steve Howe – guitars, backing vocals; Rick Wakeman – keyboards	Union (1991); Yesyears (1991) [1 track]; In a Word: Yes (1969–) (2002) [2 tracks]; Union Live (2011)
mid 1993 – November 1995	Chris Squire – bass, backing vocals; Alan White – drums, percussion; Trevor Rabin – guitars, lead & backing vocals, keyboards; Tony Kaye – keyboards; Jon Anderson – lead vocals; with: Billy Sherwood – keyboards, guitar, backing vocals (touring musician 1994)	Talk (1994); In a Word: Yes (1969–) (2002) [2 tracks]
November 1995 – mid 1997	Chris Squire – bass, backing vocals; Alan White – drums, percussion backing vocals; Jon Anderson – lead vocals; Steve Howe – guitars, backing vocals; Rick Wakeman – keyboards	Keys to Ascension (1996); Keys to Ascension 2 (1997); In a Word: Yes (1969–) (2002) [1 track]
mid – October 1997	Chris Squire – bass, backing vocals; Alan White – drums, percussion, backing vocals; Jon Anderson – lead vocals, rhythm guitar; Steve Howe – lead guitar, backing vocals; Billy Sherwood – lead guitar, backing vocals	Open Your Eyes (1997); In a Word: Yes (1969–) (2002) [2 tracks]
October 1997 – August 2000	Chris Squire – bass, backing vocals; Alan White – drums, percussion, backing vocals; Jon Anderson – lead vocals, rhythm guitar; Steve Howe – lead guitar, backing vocals; Billy Sherwood – lead guitar, keyboards, backing vocals; Igor Khoroshev – keyboards	The Ladder (1999); House of Yes: Live from House of Blues (2000); In a Word: Yes (1969–) (2002) [2 tracks]
2000	Chris Squire – bass, backing vocals; Alan White – drums, percussion, backing vocals; Jon Anderson – lead vocals, rhythm guitar; Steve Howe – lead guitar, backing vocals; Igor Khoroshev – keyboards	Magnification (2001) [live bonus tracks]
2000 – December 2001	Chris Squire – bass, backing vocals, keyboards; Alan White – drums, percussion, backing vocals, keyboards; Jon Anderson – lead vocals, rhythm guitar; Steve Howe – lead guitar, backing vocals; with: Tom Brislin – keyboards, backing vocals, percussion (touring musician 2001)	Magnification (2001); Symphonic Live (2002); In a Word: Yes (1969–) (2002) [2 tracks]
April 2002 – September 2004	Chris Squire – bass, backing vocals; Alan White – drums, percussion, backing vocals; Jon Anderson – lead vocals, rhythm guitar; Steve Howe – lead guitar, backing vocals; Rick Wakeman – keyboards	Yesspeak (2004); Yes Acoustic: Guaranteed No Hiss (2004); Songs from Tsongas (2005); Live at Montreux 2003 (2007)
November 2004	Chris Squire – bass, backing vocals; Alan White – drums; Steve Howe – lead guitar; Trevor Rabin – rhythm guitar, lead vocals; Geoff Downes – keyboards	Produced By Trevor Horn: A Concert For The Prince's Trust - Live At Wembley Arena London 2004 (2005)
The band were on hiatus between 2004 and 2009
May – September 2008	Chris Squire – bass, backing vocals; Alan White – drums, percussion; Steve Howe – guitars, backing vocals; Jon Anderson – lead vocals; Oliver Wakeman – keyboards, backing vocals	none – tour cancelled before rehearsals when Anderson was diagnosed with respiratory failure
June 2009 – March 2011 (The same lineup performed as Steve Howe, Chris Squire and Alan White of Yes from September 2008 until June 2009)	Chris Squire – bass, backing vocals; Alan White – drums, percussion; Steve Howe – guitars, backing vocals; Oliver Wakeman – keyboards, backing vocals; Benoît David – lead vocals	In the Present – Live from Lyon (2011); From a Page (2019)
March 2011 – February 2012	Chris Squire – bass, backing vocals; Alan White – drums, percussion; Steve Howe – guitars, backing vocals; Benoît David – lead vocals; Geoff Downes – keyboards	Fly from Here (2011)
February 2012 – June 2015	Chris Squire – bass, backing vocals; Alan White – drums, percussion; Steve Howe – guitars, backing vocals; Geoff Downes – keyboards; Jon Davison – lead vocals, acoustic guitar	Heaven & Earth (2014); Like It Is: Yes at the Bristol Hippodrome (2014); Like It Is: Yes at the Mesa Arts Center (2015)
May 2015 – May 2022	Alan White – drums, percussion; Steve Howe – guitars, backing vocals; Geoff Downes – keyboards; Jon Davison – lead vocals, acoustic guitar; Billy Sherwood – bass, backing vocals; with: Jay Schellen – additional drums, percussion (touring musician 2016–2017, 2018–present); Dylan Howe – additional drums (touring musician 2017); Tony Kaye – additional keyboards (guest appearances at several shows 2018–2019); Patrick Moraz – additional keyboards (guest appearances at several shows 2018–2019)	Topographic Drama – Live Across America (2017); 50 Live (2019); The Royal Affair Tour: Live from Las Vegas (2020); The Quest (2021)
April 2017 (performing "Roundabout" and "Owner of a Lonely Heart" at their induction into the Rock and Roll Hall of Fame)	Alan White – drums, percussion; Steve Howe – lead guitar, backing vocals on "Roundabout", bass on "Owner of a Lonely Heart"; Jon Anderson – lead vocals; Rick Wakeman – keyboards; Trevor Rabin – rhythm guitar, backing vocals; with Geddy Lee – bass on "Roundabout" (guest)	none - live performances only.; Chris Squire, Bill Bruford, and Tony Kaye were also inducted. Squire died in 2015, Bruford attended the induction but did not perform, and Kaye did not attend due to illness.
May 2022 – present	Steve Howe – guitars, backing vocals; Geoff Downes – keyboards; Jon Davison – lead vocals, acoustic guitar; Billy Sherwood – bass, backing vocals; Jay Schellen – drums, percussion (touring musician until February 2023)	Mirror to the Sky (2023); Aurora (2026)

=== Bands closely related to Yes ===
There have been two occasions when a line-up of former Yes members has competed with the official line-up of Yes. These bands included former Yes members, performed/perform Yes music and presented/present themselves within the context of Yes' history.

Band/Period	Members	Releases
Cinema: 1982–1983	Chris Squire – bass, backing and lead vocals; Tony Kaye – Hammond organ, piano; Alan White – drums, percussion; Trevor Rabin – guitars, keyboards, lead and backing vocals	Yesyears (1991) [2 tracks]
Anderson Bruford Wakeman Howe: 1988–1990	Jon Anderson – lead vocals; Steve Howe – guitar, backing vocals; Rick Wakeman – keyboards; Bill Bruford – drums, percussion; with: Milton McDonald – rhythm guitar, backing vocals (1 studio album, live shows, 2 live albums); Matt Clifford – keyboards, backing vocals (1 studio album); Tony Levin – bass, backing vocals (1 studio album, live shows, 1 live album); Julian Colbeck – keyboards, backing vocals (live shows, 2 live albums); Jeff Berlin – bass, backing vocals (some live shows, 1 live album)	Anderson Bruford Wakeman Howe (1989); An Evening of Yes Music Plus (1993); In a Word: Yes (1969–) (2002) [2 tracks]; Live at the NEC – Oct 24th 1989 (2012)
Bill Bruford and Steve Howe (as "Yes"): 1993	Bill Bruford – drums, percussion; Steve Howe – guitar, lead vocals; with: Kevin Kuhn – bass, backing vocals	no recordings, a television performance promoting Symphonic Music of Yes on Live with Regis and Kathie Lee
Steve Howe, Chris Squire and Alan White of Yes: 2008–2009	Steve Howe – guitar, backing vocals; Chris Squire – bass, backing vocals; Alan White – drums, percussion; with: Benoît David – lead vocals; Oliver Wakeman – keyboards	no recordings, live performances only
Yes feat. Jon Anderson, Trevor Rabin & Rick Wakeman: 2010–2018	Jon Anderson – lead vocals, acoustic guitar; Trevor Rabin – guitar, lead and backing vocals; Rick Wakeman – keyboards; with: Lee Pomeroy – bass, backing vocals; Lou Molino III – drums, backing vocals; Iain Hornal – bass, backing vocals (2017 Japanese tour, 2018 European tour)	Live at the Apollo (2018)
