= Lift Me Up (Yes song) =

Single by Yes

from the album Union
- B-side: "Take the Water to the Mountain" (EU) "America" (US)
- Released: 20 May 1991
- Recorded: 1989–1991
- Genre: Pop rock
- Length: 5:03 (Single version); 6:30 (Album version)
- Label: Arista - Arista ASCD-2218
- Songwriter(s): Trevor Rabin; Chris Squire
- Producer(s): Trevor Rabin

Yes singles chronology
"Rhythm of Love" (1987)	"Lift Me Up" (1991)	"Saving My Heart" (1991)

"Lift Me Up" is a song by the progressive rock band Yes. It was the first single released from their 1991 album Union. It reached the number-one spot on the Billboard Album Rock Tracks chart in May 1991, and stayed in this position for six weeks. "Lift Me Up" was Yes's third (and as of 2025, last) single to reach number one on the Billboard Album Rock Tracks chart, following 1983's "Owner of a Lonely Heart" from 90125 and 1987's "Love Will Find a Way" from Big Generator. "Lift Me Up" spent six weeks at the number one spot, from May 4 to June 8, 1991. It also charted on the Billboard Hot 100 chart, where it reached number 86.

== Background ==
Following Yes's 1987–88 tour to support the Big Generator album, singer Jon Anderson left the band and formed a new group with 1970s-era Yes members Steve Howe (guitars), Rick Wakeman (keyboards) and Bill Bruford (drums). As their new band Anderson Bruford Wakeman Howe, the quartet released a self-titled album and went on tour.

Meanwhile, the remaining members of the "official" Yes, guitarist Trevor Rabin, bassist Chris Squire, drummer Alan White and keyboardist Tony Kaye, continued work on a follow-up to Big Generator. Among the songs recorded was the Rabin- and Squire-penned "Lift Me Up", the lyrics of which allude to homelessness:

Lyrically, the verse was a little dark, we tried to make it somewhat vague as to what it was about, but one of the pictures is that it's a homeless person... 'Look around, I've got nowhere to stay... you look me up, you look me down' the guy who goes into the restaurant to use the bathroom and they look at him, 'No you can't come in here.' And he just looks to the sky [and says], 'Lift me up and turn me over,' you know, help me out.

— Trevor Rabin, Yesstories: Yes in their own words by Tim Morse

The two competing bands had fought for the rights to use the "Yes" name, with the Squire/Rabin/White/Kaye faction filing suit to prevent Anderson Bruford Wakeman Howe from using the name "Yes" during their tour promotion. However, once both factions were signed to Arista Records, the record label decided to combine the musicians' efforts and produce an album, Union, featuring songs from each group. "Lift Me Up" was one of four Rabin or Squire songs included on the album; its follow-up single, "Saving My Heart", was another.

== Charts ==
Chart (1991)	Peak position
US Billboard Hot 100	86
US Mainstream Rock (Billboard)	1
