= Saving My Heart =

Single by Yes

from the album Union
- B-side: "Lift Me Up" (UK single); "America" (UK single)
- Released: 1 July 1991
- Recorded: 1989–1991
- Genre: Reggae pop
- Length: 4:41
- Label: Arista; Arista ASCD-2263 (US); 664 553 (UK)
- Songwriter: Trevor Rabin
- Producer: Trevor Rabin

Yes singles chronology
"Lift Me Up" (1991)	"Saving My Heart" (1991)	"Make It Easy" (1991)

"Saving My Heart" is a song by British rock band Yes, written and produced by Yes vocalist and guitarist Trevor Rabin. It was the second single released from their 1991 "reunion" album Union, following "Lift Me Up". "Saving My Heart" peaked at number nine on Billboard's Mainstream Rock Tracks chart in 1991. "Saving My Heart" reached number nine on the Billboard Hot Mainstream Rock Tracks chart. It did not perform as well as "Lift Me Up", the lead single from Union (which topped the chart for six weeks) but outperformed competing Yes single "Make It Easy", a 1981 song released by Yes's old record label, Atlantic Records, to promote the Yesyears boxed set. "Lift Me Up" and "Saving My Heart" were both issued by Arista Records.

== Background ==
The Union album was the result of the merger between Yes (featuring Rabin, bassist Chris Squire, drummer Alan White, and keyboardist Tony Kaye), and Anderson Bruford Wakeman Howe, featuring 1970s-era Yes members Jon Anderson (vocals), Steve Howe (guitars), Rick Wakeman (keyboards), and Bill Bruford (drums).

"Saving My Heart" was one of the four songs on the album to be written by the Rabin–Squire faction; the others were "Lift Me Up" (the lead-off single), "Miracle of Life", and "The More We Live", a song co-written by future Yes member Billy Sherwood. Three of the four featured Anderson on vocals.

According to Rabin, the song was originally planned as a collaboration with Supertramp vocalist Roger Hodgson. Rabin felt the song, a "pop reggae tune" with a "bluesy guitar solo", did not work as a Yes song, but Anderson disagreed and wanted Yes to perform it.

== Charts ==
Chart (1991)	Peak position
US Mainstream Rock Airplay (Billboard)	9
