= An Evening of Yes Music Plus =

Live album by Anderson Bruford Wakeman Howe
- Released: 13 December 1993
- Recorded: 9 September 1989
- Venues: Shoreline Amphitheatre, Mountain View, California, US
- Genre: Progressive rock
- Length: 130:39
- Label: Fragile
- Producers: Anderson Bruford Wakeman Howe, Brian Lane (executive)

Anderson Bruford Wakeman Howe chronology
Union (1991)	An Evening of Yes Music Plus (1993)	Live at the NEC – Oct 24th 1989 (2012)

Professional ratings
Review scores
Source	Rating
AllMusic	2.5/5 stars

An Evening of Yes Music Plus is a double live album from the English progressive rock band Anderson Bruford Wakeman Howe, released in December 1993 on Fragile Records.

== Overview ==
An Evening of Yes Music Plus is a recording of the group's concert at the Shoreline Amphitheatre in Mountain View, California, US on 9 September 1989 that was originally broadcast on the King Biscuit Flower Hour radio program and as a pay-per-view special in the United States. The recording features bassist Jeff Berlin, who filled in for regular touring bassist Tony Levin due to the latter fighting hepatitis.

"Starship Trooper" includes snippets of "Soon" and "Nous Sommes Du Soleil".

== Production ==
The cover features a painting by Roger Dean titled "Floating Islands".

== Track listing ==
=== CD (1993) ===
Disc one
No.	Title	Writer(s)	Length
1.	"The Young Person's Guide to the Orchestra"	Benjamin Britten	1:41
2.	"Jon Anderson Solo": a. "Time and a Word"; b. "Owner of a Lonely Heart"; c. "Teakbois"; d. "Time and a Word (reprise)"	a. Jon Anderson, David Foster b. Trevor Rabin, Anderson, Chris Squire, Trevor Horn c. Anderson, Steve Howe, Rick Wakeman, Bill Bruford	7:32
3.	"Steve Howe Solo": a. "Clap"; b. "Mood for a Day"	Howe	9:35
4.	"Rick Wakeman Solo": a. "Gone But Not Forgotten"; b. "Catherine Parr"; c. "Merlin the Magician"	Wakeman	5:37
5.	"Long Distance Runaround / Bill Bruford Solo"	Anderson / Bruford	7:10
6.	"Birthright"	Anderson, Bruford, Wakeman, Howe, Max Bacon	7:23
7.	"And You and I": i. "Cord of Life"; ii. "Eclipse"; iii. "The Preacher the Teacher"; iv. "Apocalypse"	Anderson, themes by Howe, Squire, Bruford	9:54
8.	"Starship Trooper": a. "Life Seeker"; b. "Disillusion"; c. "Wurm"	a. Anderson b. Squire c. Howe	12:48

Disc two
No.	Title	Writer(s)	Length
1.	"Close to the Edge": i. "The Solid Time of Change"; ii. "Total Mass Retain"; iii. "I Get Up, I Get Down"; iv. "Seasons of Man"	Anderson, Howe	19:48
2.	"Themes": i. "Sound"; ii. "Second Attention"; iii. "Soul Warrior"	Anderson, Howe, Wakeman, Bruford	6:37
3.	"Brother of Mine": i. "The Big Dream"; ii. "Nothing Can Come Between Us"; iii. "Long Lost Brother of Mine"	i., ii. Anderson, Howe, Wakeman, Bruford iii. Anderson, Howe, Wakeman, Bruford, Geoff Downes	11:00
4.	"Heart of the Sunrise"	Anderson, Bruford, Squire	11:07
5.	"Order of the Universe": i. "Order Theme"; ii. "Rock Gives Courage"; iii. "It's So Hard To Grow"; iv. "The Universe"	i., iii., iv. Anderson, Howe, Wakeman, Bruford ii. Anderson, Howe, Wakeman, Bruford, Rhett Lawrence	9:19
6.	"Roundabout"	Anderson, Howe	9:53

=== CD reissue (2006) ===
Disc one
No.	Title	Writer(s)	Length
1.	"The Young Person's Guide to the Orchestra"		1:44
2.	"Jon Anderson Solo - Time and a Word / Owner of Lonely Heart / Teakbois"		7:34
3.	"Steve Howe Solo - Clap / Mood for a Day"		9:36
4.	"Rick Wakeman Solo - Gone But Not Forgotten / Catherine Parr / Merlin the Magician"		5:39
5.	"Long Distance Runaround / Bill Bruford Solo"		7:11
6.	"Birthright"		7:17
7.	"And You and I"		10:10
8.	"I've Seen All Good People": a. "Your Move"; b. "All Good People"	a. Anderson b. Squire	9:14

Disc two
No.	Title	Length
1.	"Close to the Edge"	19:49
2.	"Themes"	6:37
3.	"Brother of Mine"	11:00
4.	"Heart of the Sunrise"	11:07
5.	"Order of the Universe"	9:19
6.	"Roundabout"	8:49
7.	"Starship Trooper"	12:52

Note: All song details and writing credits as above. "I've Seen All Good People" added to the tracklist at the end of disc one; "Starship Trooper" moved to its actual place in setlist at the end of disc two.

=== DVD (1997) ===
Disc one
No.	Title	Length
1.	"Program start"	3:05
2.	"The Young Person's Guide to the Orchestra"	1:48
3.	"Time and a Word"	2:43
4.	"Owner of a Lonely Heart / Teakbois / Time and a Word (reprise)"	4:35
5.	"Clap"	4:56
6.	"Mood for a Day"	4:46
7.	"Gone But Not Forgotten"	2:41
8.	"Catherine Parr / Merlin the Magician"	3:11
9.	"Long Distance Runaround / Bill Bruford Solo"	7:10
10.	"Birthright"	6:47
11.	"And You and I"	10:52
12.	"I've Seen All Good People"	9:21
13.	"Close to the Edge"	20:20
14.	"Themes"	6:39
15.	"Brother of Mine"	12:07
16.	"The Meeting"	5:07

Disc two
No.	Title	Writer(s)	Length
1.	"Heart of the Sunrise"		12:27
2.	"Order of the Universe"		9:12
3.	"Roundabout"		9:37
4.	"End credits"		1:55
5.	"Starship Trooper"		13:19
6.	"Brother of Mine" (bonus music video, 2006 DVD reissue)		8:34
7.	"Order of the Universe" (bonus music video, 2006 DVD reissue)		8:46
8.	"Quartet (I'm Alive)" (bonus music video, 2006 DVD reissue)	Anderson, Howe, Wakeman, Bruford, Ben Dowling	4:12

Note: All song details and writing credits as above.

== Personnel ==
Anderson Bruford Wakeman Howe

- Jon Anderson – lead vocals
- Bill Bruford – drums, percussion
- Rick Wakeman – keyboards
- Steve Howe – guitar, backing vocals

Additional musicians

- Jeff Berlin – bass
- Julian Colbeck – additional keyboards, backing vocals
- Milton McDonald – rhythm guitar, backing vocals
