= Live in Philadelphia (Yes video) =

Yes: Live in Philadelphia 1979

Video by Yes
- Released: 1995
- Recorded: 21 June 1979
- Venues: Philadelphia Spectrum (Philadelphia, PA)
- Label: Sanctuary Records Group

Yes chronology
Yes: Live - 1975 at Q.P.R. (1993)	Yes: Live in Philadelphia 1979 (1995)	Keys to Ascension (1996)

Yes: Live in Philadelphia 1979 is the video release of a concert by the progressive rock group Yes recorded live at the Philadelphia Spectrum on June 21, 1979. The concert is performed "in the round" with a rotating stage in the centre of the venue. The concert was part of the summer leg of their 1978–1979 tour to support the album Tormato. It would be the last Yes tour to feature founding vocalist Jon Anderson until the band's 1983 reformation, and the final tour to feature keyboardist Rick Wakeman until the 1991 Union tour.

The visual and sound quality are poor compared to modern video releases, but this represents one of the few visual recordings of the band from this period.

== Track listing ==
1. "Siberian Khatru"
2. "Circus of Heaven"
3. "Starship Trooper"
4. "Alan White Drum Solo" (excerpt from "Arriving UFO")
5. "Leaves of Green" (excerpt from "The Ancient")
6. "I've Seen All Good People"
7. "Roundabout"

== Personnel ==
- Jon Anderson – vocals, guitar, percussion
- Steve Howe – guitar, backing vocals
- Chris Squire – bass, backing vocals
- Rick Wakeman – keyboards
- Alan White – drums
