= Anderson Bruford Wakeman Howe =

British rock band (1988–1991)

- Left to right: Rick Wakeman, Jon Anderson, Bill Bruford, Steve Howe.

Background information
- Also known as: ABWH
- Origin: England, UK
- Genres: Progressive rock
- Years active: 1988–1991
- Labels: Arista; Fragile; Herald/Caroline (US); Tring International (EEC); Voiceprint
- Spinoff of: Yes
- Past members: Jon Anderson; Bill Bruford; Rick Wakeman; Steve Howe

Anderson Bruford Wakeman Howe (ABWH) were an English progressive rock band active from 1988 to 1990 that comprised four past members of the English progressive rock band Yes. Singer Jon Anderson left Yes as he felt increasingly constrained by their commercial and pop-oriented direction in the 1980s. He began an album with other members from the band's 1970s era: guitarist Steve Howe, keyboardist Rick Wakeman, and drummer Bill Bruford, plus bassist Tony Levin (Bruford's bandmate in King Crimson).

The group released their only studio album, Anderson Bruford Wakeman Howe, in June 1989 which reached number 14 in the UK and number 30 in the US. Their 1989–90 world tour was well-received and spawned two live albums, An Evening of Yes Music Plus (1993) and Live at the NEC – Oct 24th 1989 (2012).

The thirteenth Yes album, Union (1991), featured tracks recorded in 1990 and originally intended for a second ABWH studio album, alongside songs recorded by Yes around the same time and a solo track by Howe. This marked the end of Anderson Bruford Wakeman Howe and the start of the eight-member Yes formation which lasted until 1992, comprising Anderson, Bruford, Wakeman, Howe, Chris Squire, Trevor Rabin, Tony Kaye, and Alan White.

== History ==
=== Background and formation ===
In 1983, singer Jon Anderson returned to Yes to record lead vocals on their 1983 studio album 90125, which saw Yes adopt a musical direction that was more commercial and pop-oriented. The line-up during this time included bassist Chris Squire, drummer Alan White, keyboardist Tony Kaye, and guitarist Trevor Rabin, who wrote the majority of 90125. The release of 90125 saw Yes reach their greatest commercial success. It was followed by their 1987 album Big Generator, also a significant commercial success.

In September 1988, Anderson left Yes citing his growing dissatisfaction with the band's commercial direction. He had also felt sidelined from the creative process due to the machinations of other band members and producer Trevor Horn. Anderson spent his summer on the Greek island of Hydra writing songs with Vangelis, where he first came up with the idea of making music with other members of the 1971–72 Yes line-up of guitarist Steve Howe, keyboardist Rick Wakeman, and drummer Bill Bruford. The only missing member from that line-up was Chris Squire, who remained in the then-current version of Yes.

=== Studio album ===
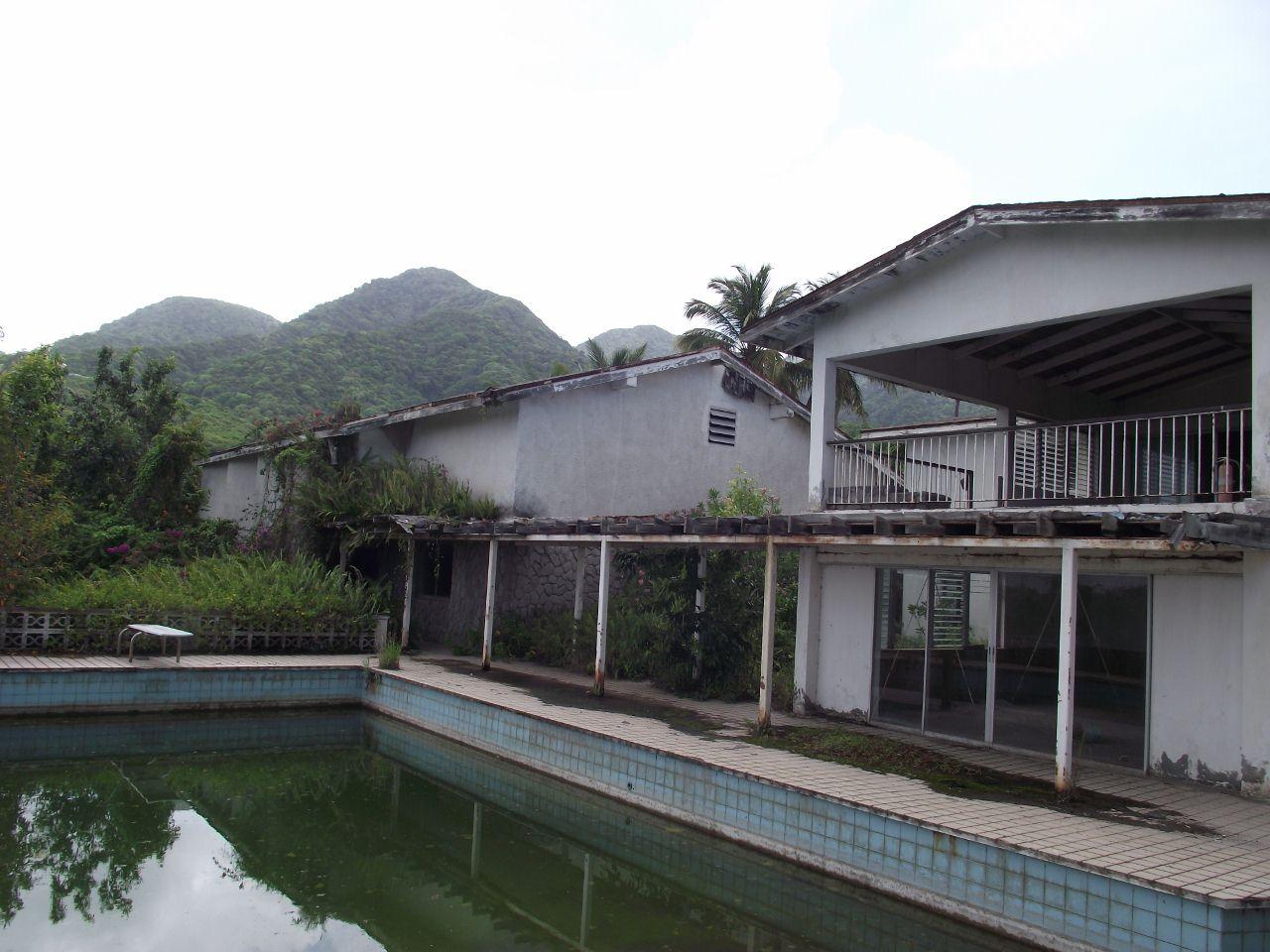
The remains of AIR Studios in Montserrat in 2013.

On his return trip from Hydra, Anderson met Howe in London who presented him with his musical ideas including the chorus of "Brother of Mine" and "Birthright". Five weeks were spent producing demo tracks at La Frette Studios in Paris. Anderson asked musician Milton McDonald to help with the project and play additional guitars. Bruford recalled meeting Anderson, Howe, Wakeman, and former Yes manager Brian Lane, at the airport in London. He said, "Oh, we're in trouble here. This obviously meant it was some sort of Yes project ... I thought I was just going to put some drums on a Jon Anderson solo record".

Recording moved to AIR Studios on the island of Montserrat for six weeks. Bruford saw the recording location as "a deal clincher". It was there when Bruford suggested to have his King Crimson bandmate Tony Levin play bass on the album. Bruford noticed Anderson being "on strong form ... he conducted proceedings without fear of let or hindrance" from the problematic times recording with Yes. When recording was complete, Anderson supervised the album's mixing sessions at Bearsville Studios with mixing engineers Steve Thompson and Michael Barbiero.

Anderson Bruford Wakeman Howe was released on 20 June 1989 through Arista Records, using catalog number AL85-90126. The album peaked at number 14 in the UK and number 30 in the US. It went on to reach the top 30 in Canada, Switzerland, Germany, France, Norway, and Sweden. The album sold 750,000 copies.

=== Lawsuit and tour ===
On 31 May 1989, weeks before the release of their album and tour, the group were subject to a suit filed by Yes that wished to prevent Anderson Bruford Wakeman Howe from mentioning the name "Yes" in their promotional material, suggesting or calling attention to Yes music, which they argued may cause "confusion in the minds of the public over which group is the real Yes", and prohibiting Anderson from speaking of his former membership in Yes. The suit was based on a separation agreement entered into by each past and present member of Yes in May 1984 that specified who was entitled to use the Yes name; any "withdrawing partner" from the group could no longer use the name or mention they were in the band before, after a specified date. Yes argued that Anderson Bruford Wakeman Howe had "wrongfully converted" the Yes name in an advertisement for Los Angeles Times that promoted their upcoming concert as "an evening of Yes music plus". Anderson Bruford Wakeman Howe filed a response on 5 June; their attorneys called Yes's suit "an outrageous attempt ... to stop the media and public from comparing ABWH's new recording with theirs". According to former Yes tour co-ordinator Jim Halley, "the European promoters began splashing the name Yes all over the posters ... in the end they came to an accommodation". Anderson stressed, "we never said we were Yes. It was the record company." In June 1989, a U.S District Court judge ruled that ABWH could refer to its Yes heritage and material in promoting their tour.

ABWH named the tour An Evening of Yes Music, Plus. Rehearsals took place at Nomis Studios in London.

=== Cancelled second album, merger with Yes and Union ===
ABWH and Yes produced a Yes album titled Union. The album includes recordings originally intended for separate albums by both groups. Several songs originally intended for the second ABWH album, tentatively titled Dialogue, surfaced on the 1990s bootleg We Make Believe and the underground Yesoteric bootleg compilation. This material included demos by Anderson but without the other three that were subsequently released as part of Jon Anderson's The Lost Tapes box set series as Watching the Flags That Fly.

Songs from the ABWH album have been included on subsequent Yes compilations and Yes concerts.

== Personnel ==
Anderson Bruford Wakeman Howe

- Jon Anderson – lead and backing vocals, acoustic guitars, percussion, harp
- Bill Bruford – acoustic and electronic drums, percussion
- Rick Wakeman – keyboards
- Steve Howe – acoustic and electric guitars, lap steel guitar, backing vocals

Additional musicians

- Tony Levin – bass, Chapman stick, backing vocals (album and European tour)
- Jeff Berlin – bass, backing vocals (American tour replacement after Levin fell ill)
- Milton McDonald – rhythm guitar (album and tour), backing vocals (tour)
- Matt Clifford – keyboards, programming, orchestration and backing vocals (album)
- Julian Colbeck – additional keyboards, backing vocals (tour)
- Deborah Anderson, Tessa Niles, Carol Kenyon, Francis Dunnery, Chris Kimsey - backing vocals (album)
- Emerald Isle Community Singers, Montserrat - backing vocals
- Joe Hammer - percussion programming

== Discography and videography ==
Studio albums

- Anderson Bruford Wakeman Howe (1989)

Singles

- "Brother of Mine" / "Themes" (1989) [UK #63]
- "Order of the Universe" / "Fist of Fire" (1989) [UK #93]
- "I'm Alive" / "Let's Pretend" (Ger/US 1989)

Live albums

- An Evening of Yes Music Plus (1993)
- Live at the NEC – Oct 24th 1989 (2010)

Home videos

- In the Big Dream (1989)
- An Evening of Yes Music Plus (1993)

Music videos

- "Brother of Mine" (1989)
- "Order of the Universe" (1989)
- "I'm Alive" (1989)
