= Yes: Live – 1975 at Q.P.R. =

Yes: Live - 1975 at Q.P.R.
- Volume 2 cover

Video by Yes
- Released: 1993
- Recorded: 10 May 1975
- Venue: Loftus Road Stadium
- Genre: Progressive rock
- Length: 1 hour 22 minutes (vol 1); 1 hour 6 minutes (vol 2)
- Director: Tom Corchrane
- Producer: Brian Lane

Yes chronology
Greatest Video Hits (1991)	Yes: Live - 1975 at Q.P.R. (1993)	Live in Philadelphia (1995)

Yes: Live - 1975 at Q.P.R.
- Volume 1 cover

Yes: Live – 1975 at Q.P.R. is a video release of a 1975 concert by the group Yes at Queens Park Rangers' Loftus Road stadium in England. Some of the footage was originally broadcast on The Old Grey Whistle Test. The performance was available for many years as a bootleg before former Yes manager Brian Lane co-ordinated a 1993 two-volume VHS release and a Japanese two-Laserdisc release without any input from the band. In 2001, the video was released on a two-disc DVD set.

In 2021, a 4CD "Deluxe Edition" of the concert was announced through a leaflet included on the Union 30 Live limited edition boxset, to be released under Takeaway Records, but so far nothing has come of it.

== Personnel ==
- Jon Anderson – vocals, guitar, percussion, drums, whistle
- Steve Howe – guitar, lap steel guitar, Portuguese guitar, classical guitar, tympani
- Chris Squire – bass guitar, acoustic guitar, backing vocals, tympani
- Patrick Moraz – keyboards
- Alan White – drums, percussion

== Track listing ==
=== Disc One ===
1. "Introduction - Igor Stravinsky: Firebird Suite" / "Sound Chaser"
2. "Close to the Edge"
  I. "The Solid Time of Change"
  II. "Total Mass Retain"
  III. "I Get Up, I Get Down"
  IV. "Seasons of Man"
3. "To Be Over"
4. "The Gates of Delirium"
5. "I've Seen All Good People: Your Move" / "Mood for a Day"
6. "Long Distance Runaround (Acoustic)"
7. "Clap"

=== Disc Two ===
1. And You and I"
  I. "Cord of Life"
  II. "Eclipse"
  III. "The Preacher, The Teacher"
  IV. "Apocalypse"
2. "Ritual (Nous Sommes du Soleil)"
3. "Roundabout"
4. "Sweet Dreams"
5. "Yours Is No Disgrace"
