= Anderson Bruford Wakeman Howe (album) =

Studio album by Anderson Bruford Wakeman Howe
- Released: 20 June 1989
- Recorded: 1988–1989
- Studios: La Frette (Paris, France); AIR (Montserrat, British West Indies); AIR (London, UK)
- Genre: Progressive rock
- Length: 59:05
- Label: Arista
- Producers: Jon Anderson; Chris Kimsey

Anderson Bruford Wakeman Howe chronology
Anderson Bruford Wakeman Howe (1989)	Union (1991)

Singles from Anderson Bruford Wakeman Howe
- 1. "Brother of Mine" Released: 5 June 1989; 2. "I'm Alive" Released: 9 October 1989 (US); 3. "Order of the Universe" Released: 16 October 1989 (UK)

Anderson Bruford Wakeman Howe is the only studio album by English progressive rock band Anderson Bruford Wakeman Howe, released in June 1989 on Arista Records.

== Background and recording ==
The project began in 1988. At that time vocalist Jon Anderson had felt artistically constrained within Yes' current format, where the songwriting of Trevor Rabin had taken the band in a commercially successful but musically and lyrically different direction. Anderson regrouped with Steve Howe, Rick Wakeman and Bill Bruford. Bruford, who had at various times been a member of King Crimson, recruited his Crimson bandmate Tony Levin as their bassist. The group was unable to use the name Yes for legal reasons. However, the group did have Arista assign the catalog number of 90126 to the original releases of the CD and cassette. This was a subtle way of stamping this as the next Yes album after 90125 (1983).

Pre-production recording took place at La Frette Studios near Paris with Anderson putting down an outline of much of the album's songs with guitarist Milton McDonald, percussion programmer Joe Hammer and keyboardist/arranger Matt Clifford. Anderson notably built on several demos provided by Howe, some of which Howe released on his solo album Homebrew (1996) and subsequent releases. Recording then relocated at AIR Studios on the island of Montserrat with Wakeman, Bruford and Levin. Most of the album was recorded using C-Lab's Notator software.

Howe recorded his guitar parts separately at SARM West Studios in London. Mixing took place at Bearsville Studios in Bearsville, New York. Howe wrote in 2021 that Steve Thompson and Michael Barbiero, who supervised the mixing along with Anderson, were, while very in demand at the time, unfamiliar with the Yes sound and how the band had balanced its instruments in mixes over the years. Some songs appeared to him to have been pieced together at that stage of post-production, as writing credits did not reflect the actual input. Howe says that while "Themes", the opening track, credits him as one of the writers, he had nothing to do with it, and conversely other members share credit on compositions that were largely his. Bruford has said that though he is credited as co-writer on all of the tracks, he had nothing to do with writing or even arranging any of them, and his role was limited to re-recording parts that had already been laid down with drum machines before he became involved with the project.

== Songs ==
The final section of "Brother of Mine", "Long Lost Brother of Mine", originated as a song written by Howe and Geoff Downes for Asia.

"Birthright" concerns the British nuclear tests at Maralinga in the 1950s and 1960s in Australia and incorporates material by Howe and Max Bacon for their band Nerotrend.

The second section of "Quartet", "She Gives Me Love", contains lyrical references to several Yes songs, including "South Side of the Sky", "Long Distance Runaround", "The Gates of Delirium", "Awaken", and "Roundabout".

"Let's Pretend" was originally written by Anderson and Vangelis as a Jon and Vangelis song, but it was rearranged as a voice and guitar duet for Anderson and Howe.

== Cover ==
The artwork was designed and illustrated by Roger Dean, known for designing several Yes covers and stage sets in the 1970s, including their logo, the last being Classic Yes (1981). Dean was asked to design the cover in February 1989, and claimed he was not briefed on its direction and proceeded to work on "whatever seems appropriate"; his main idea was to suggest what American Indian culture might have developed if European colonists had not come to the Americas. Much of the cover depicts real landscapes and formations in the US; the clay pinnacles in the foreground are in Bryce Canyon, Utah and the background hills are based on the Vermilion Cliffs by the Colorado River. The cover is formed of two titled paintings, Blue Desert on the front and Red Desert on the back.

== Release ==
The album was released on 20 June 1989, and reached No. 14 on the UK Album Chart and No. 30 on the US Billboard 200. Elsewhere, it reached the top 30 in Canada, Switzerland, Germany, France, Norway, and Sweden. On August 30, 1989, the album was certified gold by the Recording Industry Association of America (RIAA) for selling 500,000 copies in the US. Yes biographer Chris Welch reported that the album sold approximately 750,000 copies.

"Brother of Mine" was released as an edited single and peaked at No. 2 on the Billboard Mainstream Rock Tracks chart. Its music video was directed by Storm Thorgerson. According to Bill Bruford, "Clive Davis, head of Arista, produced the edit. There was a fair bit of groaning as Clive master-minded what many thought was a massive missed opportunity. Everyone at radio just wanted an obvious single from this song, and Clive managed to omit the hook. The upside was we would probably have turned into Asia, which is something of a relief."

== Critical reception ==
Professional ratings
Review scores
Source	Rating
AllMusic	4/5 stars
Classic Rock	3.5/5 stars

Billboard thought that the album "harks back to the often -brilliant Yes of yore thematically and musically" and believed that "virtually anything here will score on album radio". Cashbox wrote that the band's "lushly orchestrated sound is as fresh and relevant as tomorrow's headlines, adding that "new-age softness + classical noodling + easy-to-swallow nuggets of mysto-philosophy = boffo sales." Music & Media said that the album had "the definitive Yes sound of the mid-70s with a cleaner production."

The Gazette opined that, "Yes, they are tremendous musicians—with the exception of the hinge-like singing of Jon Anderson. But virtuosity at the service of overwritten, outdated music is flatulence itself." The Times said that "everything you never liked about Yes—the endless fiddling around, the pretentious, waffling arrangements, and of course Anderson's peculiarly grating, emasculated vocals—is delivered in spades, but with little of the imaginative grandeur or inventive cut and thrust needed to keep the music buoyant."

Paul Stump's 1997 History of Progressive Rock commented, "The album was calculated to appeal to diehards; sweeping orchestral bridges, episodic songs, multitudinous solos. But this, as did the 90125 project, lacks momentum, the emotional syntax of the music is still boringly rock-based; the orchestration, once pearly and luminous, sounds merely stodgy, and technology remains under-utilized; even Horn's primitive samplings of 1983 are absent here."

== Reissues ==
The album was re-released in a remastered limited edition by Gonzo Multimedia on 18 March 2011, with a bonus CD with extra tracks, including alternate edits and live versions of tracks on the main album, as well as "Vultures in the City" (originally titled "Vultures" and previously available only as the b-side to the "Brother of Mine" 7-inch vinyl and CD single). Additionally, a demo of a 1986 Jon and Vangelis-penned song called "Distant Thunder" appears as a hidden track. This song would later be rerecorded by Yes as "Children of Light" on Keys to Ascension 2. This edition was initially available only from Gonzo but can now be bought from other suppliers. In 2014 Esoteric Recordings reissued the album in time for its 25th anniversary.

== Track listing ==
All music and lyrics by Anderson, Howe, Wakeman and Bruford. Additional writing credits are below:

No.	Title	Additional writers	Length
1.	"Themes": I. "Sound"; II. "Second Attention"; III. "Soul Warrior"		5:57
2.	"Fist of Fire"		3:27
3.	"Brother of Mine": I. "The Big Dream"; II. "Nothing Can Come Between Us"; III. "Long Lost Brother of Mine"	Geoff Downes ("Long Lost Brother of Mine")	10:16
4.	"Birthright"	Max Bacon	6:00
5.	"The Meeting"		4:16
6.	"Quartet": I. "I Wanna Learn"; II. "She Gives Me Love"; III. "Who Was the First"; IV. "I'm Alive"	Ben Dowling ("She Gives Me Love")	9:16
7.	"Teakbois"		7:35
8.	"Order of the Universe": I. "Order Theme"; II. "Rock Gives Courage"; III. "It's So Hard to Grow"; IV. "The Universe"	Rhett Lawrence ("Rock Gives Courage")	9:01
9.	"Let's Pretend"	Vangelis	2:56

2011 Re-issue Bonus Disc (From Gonzo Multimedia)
No.	Title	Writer(s)	Length
1.	"Rick Wakeman Intro's [sic]"	Wakeman	2:48
2.	"Brother of Mine" (Edit)		6:30
3.	"Brother of Mine" (Radio Edit)		3:22
4.	"Vultures in the City"		5:50
5.	"Order of the Universe" (Edit)		4:51
6.	"Order of the Universe" (Long Edit)		6:00
7.	"Quartet (I'm Alive)" (Single Edit)		3:15
8.	"Brother of Mine" (Live)		10:49
9.	"And You and I" (Live)	Anderson, Howe, Bruford, Chris Squire	10:31
10.	"Order of the Universe" (Live)		9:38
11.	"Distant Thunder" (Demo; hidden track)	Anderson, Vangelis	5:00

Note: "Distant Thunder" is a hidden track appended to the live version of "Order of the Universe", and plays after 53 seconds of silence. The time of 5:00 is the length from when "Distant Thunder" plays after the silence. It was rerecorded by Yes on Keys to Ascension 2, as "Children of Light".

2014 Remaster Bonus Disc (From Esoteric Recordings)
No.	Title	Length
1.	"Order of the Universe" (Long Edit)	6:00
2.	"Brother of Mine" (Long Edit)	6:30
3.	"Vultures in the City"	5:50
4.	"Quartet (I'm Alive)" (CD Single Edit)	3:15
5.	"Order of the Universe" (Short Edit)	4:51
6.	"Brother of Mine" (Short Edit)	3:22

== Personnel ==
Credits are adapted from the album's LP liner notes.

Anderson Bruford Wakeman Howe

- Jon Anderson – lead vocals, production
- Bill Bruford – Tama acoustic drums, Simmons SDX electronic drums
- Rick Wakeman – keyboards
- Steve Howe – guitars

Additional personnel

- Tony Levin – bass, Chapman stick, vocals
- Matt Clifford – keyboards, programming, orchestration, vocals
- Milton McDonald – rhythm guitar
- The Oxford Circus Singers (Deborah Anderson, Tessa Niles, Carol Kenyon, Frank Dunnery) - backing vocals
- J.M.C. Singers – Jon, Matt, Chris - backing vocals
- Emerald Isle Community Singers - backing vocals
- In Seine Singers - backing vocals

Technical personnel

- Chris Kimsey – production, engineering
- Chris Potter – engineering
- Giles Sampic – engineering at La Frette Studios
- Rupert Coulson – assistant engineering at AIR Studios, London
- George Cowen – assistant engineering
- Steve Orchard – assistant engineering at AIR Studios, Montserrat
- "Texas" Joe Hammer – percussion programming at La Frette Studios
- Chris Ranson – group tech
- Michael Barbiero – mixing
- Steve Thompson – mixing
- George Cowan – assistant mixing
- Olivier Bloch-Laine – assistant
- Bob Ludwig – mastering at Masterdisk
- Roger Dean – artwork, painting, design
- Martyn Dean – stage design consultant

== Charts ==
=== Album ===
Chart (1989)	Peak position
Canada Top Albums/CDs (RPM)	25
Dutch Albums (Album Top 100)	25
German Albums (Offizielle Top 100)	21
Italian Albums (Musica e Dischi)	15
Norwegian Albums (VG-lista)	18
Swedish Albums (Sverigetopplistan)	21
Swiss Albums (Schweizer Hitparade)	24
UK Albums (Official Charts)	14
US Billboard 200	30

=== Singles ===
Brother of Mine

Chart (1989)	Peak position
Canada Top Singles (RPM)	61
UK Singles (Official Charts)	63
US Alternative Airplay	2

Order of the Universe

Chart (1989)	Peak position
UK Singles (Official Charts)	93
US Alternative Airplay	24

== Certifications ==
Region	Certification	Certified units/sales
United Kingdom (BPI)	Silver	60,000^{^}
United States (RIAA)	Gold	500,000^{^}
^{^} Shipments figures based on certification alone.
