= Yesoteric =

Compilation album (bootleg) by Yes and other related artists
- Released: early 1990s
- Recorded: various times
- Studio: various
- Genre: Progressive rock

Yesoteric is a widely distributed, multi-volume bootleg compilation of music by the band Yes and other related artists which circulated beginning in the early 1990s among fans. It was initially distributed on cassettes, and later on CDs, and was often associated with the Yes fan newsletter Notes from the Edge.

With Rhino's official Yes CD re-releases surfacing in the early 2000s, followed by the release of the In a Word box set, much of the unreleased studio material was released as bonus tracks, in much higher quality, effectively negating the need for the existence of the Yesoteric set's studio material, though it still circulates largely due to the live material that exists in the "Chronicles" section of the collection.
