= Union (Yes album) =

1991 studio album by Yes

Studio album by Yes
- Released: 30 April 1991
- Recorded: 1989–1991
- Studios: Miraval (Correns); Guillaume Tell (Paris); Sarm West (London); Record Plant (Los Angeles); The Jacaranda Room (Los Angeles); Cherokee (Los Angeles); Vision Sound (New York City); Platinum Island (New York City); Langley (Devon)
- Genres: Pop rock; progressive rock; art rock; progressive pop
- Length: 65:29
- Label: Arista
- Producers: Jonathan Elias; Steve Howe; Trevor Rabin; Mark Mancina; Eddy Offord; Paul Fox; Billy Sherwood

Yes chronology
Big Generator (1987)	Union (1991)	Yesyears (1992)

Anderson Bruford Wakeman Howe chronology
Anderson Bruford Wakeman Howe (1989)	Union (1991)	An Evening of Yes Music Plus (1993)

Singles from Union
- 1. "Lift Me Up" Released: 20 May 1991; 2. "Saving My Heart" Released: 1 July 1991

Union is the thirteenth studio album by the English progressive rock band Yes, released on 30 April 1991 by Arista Records. The album was conceived following the amalgamation of two separate groups featuring current and former members of Yes: Anderson Bruford Wakeman Howe (ABWH)—comprising Jon Anderson, Bill Bruford, Rick Wakeman, and Steve Howe—and the remaining members of the band's 1980s lineup, consisting of Chris Squire, Trevor Rabin, Tony Kaye, and Alan White. After ABWH's recorded tracks were rejected by their label as uncommercial, and the alternative Yes line-up continued auditioning replacement lead vocalists following the commercial success of 90125 (1983) and Big Generator (1987), management and record executives brokered a commercial merger to combine their separate, unfinished material into a single unified project.

The album's production was highly problematic and characterised by internal friction. Due to creative differences and scheduling conflicts during the ABWH sessions, co-producer Jonathan Elias and Anderson chose to heavily overdub and replace Wakeman and Howe's parts with contributions from session musicians, a move that drew severe criticism from the affected band members. Concurrently, the Squire and Rabin-led faction contributed four tracks, which were largely developed from solo demos and collaborative material with Billy Sherwood. Marking a return to the band's classic visual identity, the album packaging features a prominent sleeve design by long-time collaborator Roger Dean, which reinstated his classic 1972 "bubble" logo alongside a newly designed square emblem variant.

Following the conclusion of the subsequent 1991–92 world tour, which was unique for featuring all eight members performing together on stage, the band reverted to its 1983–88 line-up of Anderson, Squire, Rabin, White, and Kaye.

== Background ==
The origins of Union stem from a deep schism within Yes during the late 1980s, which divided the musicians into two distinct factions. Following a period of major commercial success with the albums 90125 (1983) and Big Generator (1987), frontman Jon Anderson grew dissatisfied with the band's pop-oriented musical direction and departed in 1988. Anderson subsequently reunited with 1970s-era alumni Bill Bruford, Rick Wakeman and Steve Howe to form the spin-off group Anderson Bruford Wakeman Howe (ABWH), alongside bassist Tony Levin. While ABWH successfully toured their self-titled 1989 debut for Arista Records, the remaining four members of Yes—guitarist Trevor Rabin, bassist Chris Squire, drummer Alan White and keyboardist Tony Kaye—retained the official band moniker under Atco Records. This alternative faction began writing new material with producer Eddy Offord and auditioned replacement lead vocalists, including Steve Walsh, Roger Hodgson, Robbie Nevil, and Billy Sherwood, before their respective projects ultimately collided.

By 1990, both factions were actively developing separate follow-up albums, with ABWH convening in France alongside producer Jonathan Elias. Elias had recently collaborated with Anderson on the project Requiem for the Americas (1990), and Anderson subsequently invited him to produce the new group tracks. Bruford initially expressed immense optimism for the sophisticated instrumental tracks he, Howe, and Levin were creating. The sessions stalled, however, when Arista executives intervened, declaring the material uncommercial and demanding a radio-friendly single. In search of a solution, Anderson travelled to Los Angeles to record vocals and crossed paths with Rabin, who played him the material the Atco-signed Yes line-up had been writing. Recognising a mutual opportunity, Anderson offered to provide lead vocals for the Yes tracks and asked Rabin for a song that ABWH could use to satisfy Arista. Rabin provided three demos—including "Lift Me Up"—but requested that ABWH select only one. Anderson's enthusiasm to record all three tracks instead triggered management discussions, shifting the goal from a simple song exchange to a full commercial merger of the two separate bands.

This proposed merger met with sharply divided reactions among the musicians. Rabin viewed the arrangement as a practical vehicle to facilitate an immediate tour, whereas Squire more cynically characterised the combined project as a "salvage job." Conversely, Howe and Bruford strongly resisted the decision, arguing that ABWH had already established its own identity and had no need to re-adopt the Yes moniker. Bruford later lamented that ABWH was a promising group in the making before corporate intervention abruptly crushed it. Despite these internal objections, legal negotiations proceeded rapidly; Atco agreed to release the 1980s lineup from their contract, allowing all eight musicians to sign a joint four-album deal with Arista. The resulting project combined the separate tracks recorded by both camps, anchored by Anderson's lead vocals across the entire album. To finalise the deal, Atco retained the lucrative rights to the band's back catalogue, and Squire recalled that a massive, 90-page contract was required to resolve the labyrinth of conflicting interests between the two lineups, their respective labels, and tour promoters. While the hybrid project was being mixed, the press initially announced it under the working title Dialogue as late as February 1991, before it was ultimately renamed Union.

== Recording and production ==
=== ABWH sessions and personnel changes ===
The ten tracks originating from the ABWH camp—"I Would Have Waited Forever", "Shock to the System", "Without Hope You Cannot Start the Day", "Silent Talking", "Angkor Wat", "Dangerous (Look in the Light of What You're Searching For)", "Holding On", "Evensong", "Take the Water to the Mountain", and "Masquerade"—were tracked across five locations, including Studio Guillaume Tell in Paris, SARM West Studios in London, Record Plant Studios in Los Angeles, and Vision Sound Studios in New York City. Exceptional tracking arrangements included "Masquerade", a solo acoustic guitar piece recorded by Howe at his home studio in Devon.

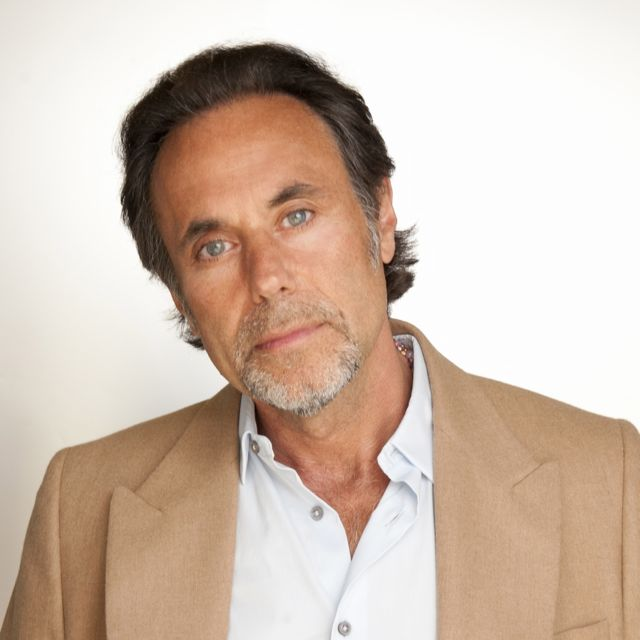
Producer Jonathan Elias, alongside Anderson, chose to overdub Wakeman and Howe's parts, a decision that drew severe criticism from the affected band members.

When Elias accepted Anderson's invitation to produce the ABWH tracks, he felt uneasy, believing the band's history of volatile internal conflicts would make capturing fresh material exceptionally difficult. Rather than spotlighting purely technical individual prowess, Elias aimed to frame the band's signature "high technical edge" within concise, direct song structures. Anderson, credited as an associate producer, initially resisted this commercial approach, wishing to distance the project from the pop-oriented direction that had defined Yes in the 1980s. According to Elias, the sessions were severely hampered by a total lack of initial musical material and intense interpersonal hostility, particularly between Anderson and Howe. He stated that the two musicians "couldn't string three chords together without fighting about what they were", forcing him to act as a buffer during the writing process. In an attempt to stimulate tracking, Elias brought a Hammond organ into the studio, but Wakeman refused to play it, dismissing the instrument as outdated. Elias later reflected that the musicians appeared totally disengaged from the music, leaving him relieved to finish the tracks at all.

Production grew more complicated once the initial takes were completed. Because Wakeman and Howe had both scheduled solo commitments prior to recording, their respective keyboard and guitar tracks were stored unfinalised on a computer. In their absence, Anderson and Elias decided the original performances lacked modern viability and hired a vast array of session musicians to completely rewrite or overdub the arrangements. Elias explained that they were looking for a more contemporary sound rather than a replication of "early-'70s pyro technique." Elias noted that the session musicians were hired out of physical necessity because the band members' individual tracks were entirely disconnected from one another, reflecting a level of mutual distrust where Wakeman and Howe refused to listen to each other's parts.

Rabin was invited to replace Howe's parts but declined. Elias subsequently recorded sessions with guitarist Scott van Zen, but those tracks were ultimately discarded in favour of recordings by Jimmy Haun. Haun, who was suggested by Steve Porcaro, noted that the final authority on which parts were kept belonged strictly to Anderson, Elias, and one unnamed associate. Despite replacing the majority of Howe's performances, Haun stated that he actively attempted to be sensitive to Howe's historic work, even utilising a Gibson ES-175 to replicate his signature tone. Elias also noted that while Tony Levin was a rational collaborator during the initial sessions, his subsequent absence from the post-production phase required Haun to supplement the bass tracks using Levin's left-behind equipment.

The extensive alterations provoked immediate, severe backlash from the displaced band members. Wakeman openly criticised Elias in Keyboard magazine for executing the unauthorized overdubbing campaign. Elias defended the decision, arguing that Union was an album of concise songs rather than "major opuses" and claiming Wakeman had simply "lost his edge." Howe was not informed that his parts had been replaced until mid-way through the European leg of the tour, when Squire advised him to listen to the final product; Squire later recalled that Howe "got very annoyed". Howe expressed deep resentment toward the production team, describing the systematic alteration of his guitar parts as akin to "having an abortion" and dismissively labelling Haun an "average guitarist." Elias countered that Howe's hostile reaction was merely the "bruised ego" of an otherwise excellent musician. Decades later, Howe included his original, un-overdubbed backing tracks for "Dangerous" and "Without Hope You Cannot Start the Day" on his 2017 compilation Anthology 2: Groups & Collaborations to showcase his intended performances.

=== Yes sessions ===
Concurrently, the Atco Records-signed faction of the band—consisting of Rabin, Squire, White, and Kaye—was given roughly three months to finalise their four song contributions: "Lift Me Up", "Saving My Heart", "Miracle of Life", and "The More We Live – Let Go". Despite the compressed timeline to complete the material, White stated that this faction maintained complete artistic license to arrange and finish the tracks according to their own preferences.

Because of the highly fragmented nature of the album's bi-coastal production camps, the final performance credits were notably uneven. While Levin performed the vast majority of the bass guitar, Chapman Stick, and fretless bass parts across the Elias-produced ABWH tracks, Squire only recorded bass for three of the four Atco-produced songs—"Lift Me Up", "Saving My Heart", and "Miracle of Life". To bridge the distinct musical styles and establish sonic continuity between the two factions, Squire travelled to Los Angeles to record extensive backing vocals. Beyond harmonising on the four Atco tracks, he added his signature vocal textures to several of the completed ABWH productions, including "I Would Have Waited Forever", "Without Hope You Cannot Start the Day", and "Dangerous".

== Songs ==
=== ABWH tracks ===
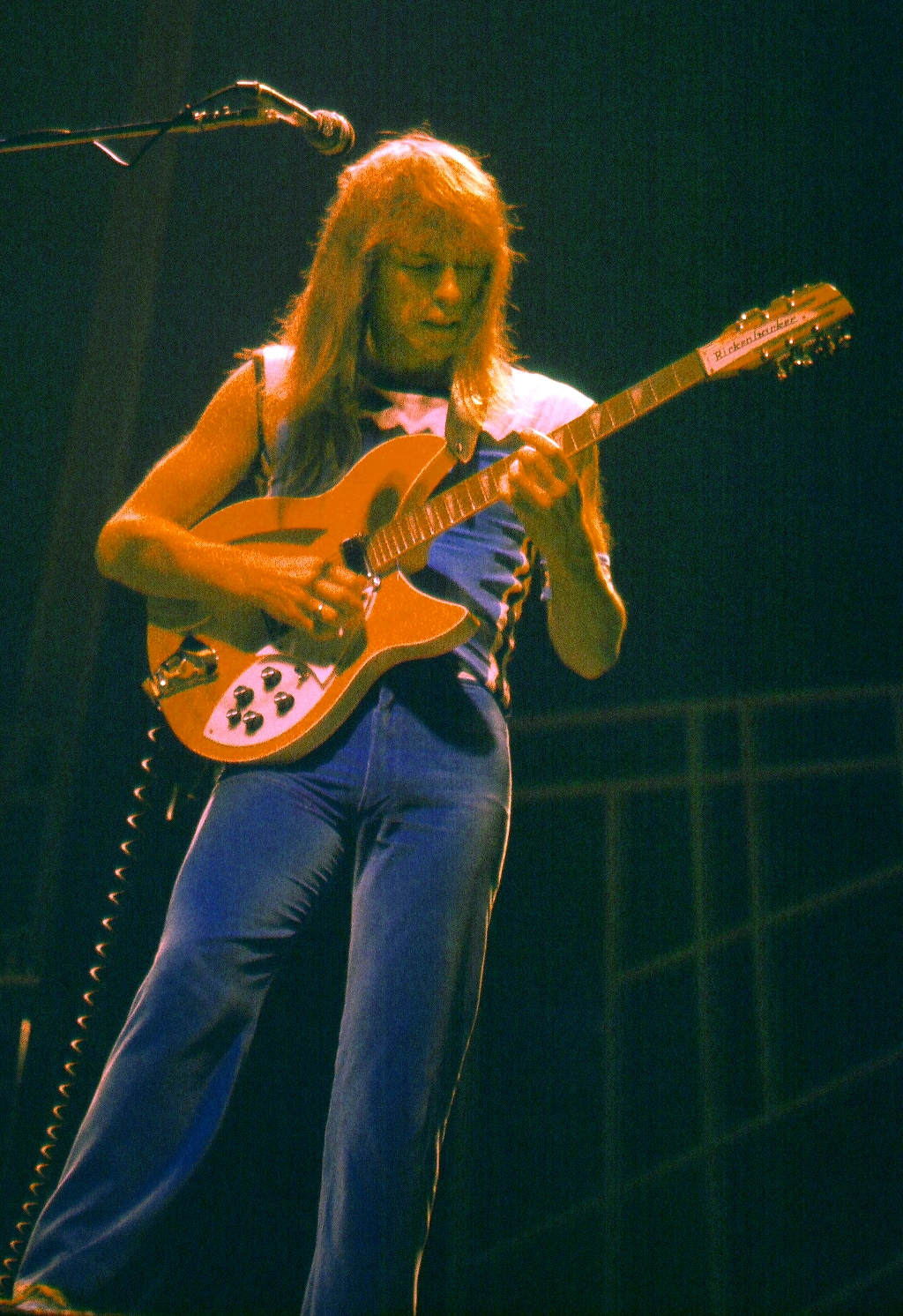
Guitarist Steve Howe recorded his solo piece "Masquerade" at home, but saw many of his other tracking contributions replaced by session players.

"I Would Have Waited Forever" features a guitar riff by Howe that he later reused on "Sensitive Chaos" from his solo album Turbulence (1991). However, the final track relies heavily on overdubs; Haun stated that while Howe plays a short, recurring phrase and the ending solo, he performed all other electric, acoustic, and effects-driven guitar tracks. According to Haun, Arista executives had specifically requested a guitar hook reminiscent of "Starship Trooper" from The Yes Album (1971). Despite these tracking complications, Elias considered the completed piece to be the song that best balanced "both early and later Yes styles."

"Shock to the System" developed from a guitar riff Howe played at the end of another song, which caught the attention of Elias, who suggested developing it further; Elias, Anderson, and Howe subsequently wrote a chorus around it in a single afternoon. Although Howe composed the opening guitar riff, Haun re-recorded the guitar parts entirely, citing a need to improve the modern sonic fidelity. Haun also devised the remaining riffs, effectively erasing Howe's performance from the final mix. Furthermore, due to Levin's absence from the post-production sessions, some of his initial bass tracks were overdubbed or supplemented by Haun. Stylistically, Haun noted that one of the replacement guitar riffs he composed for the outro was intentionally written to evoke the musical atmosphere of "The Gates of Delirium" from Relayer (1974).

"Masquerade" is a 12-string acoustic guitar instrumental written and performed entirely by Howe. He recorded the track in fifteen minutes at his home studio using a two-channel Revox tape deck, noting that the isolated session allowed him to work away from the creative friction and politics surrounding the rest of the album's production. Although Howe recorded several other pieces on a classical guitar for consideration—including a track titled "Baby Georgia"—Arista executives selected "Masquerade". Howe had initially hesitated to submit the track, believing it was not as strong as the alternative material he had recorded.

"Without Hope You Cannot Start the Day" originated from music composed by Elias, who recorded a basic structural outline in a single afternoon at Anderson's house before sending the tape to Wakeman for keyboard additions. However, Elias and Anderson were highly dissatisfied with Wakeman's contributions; while they had envisioned a "simple and gentle" accompaniment, Wakeman delivered a complex arrangement that Elias felt "sounded like a Rachmaninoff piano concerto." Consequently, the production team completely replaced Wakeman's work with a newly recorded piano part. Howe is also entirely absent from the final tracking of the song, with his intended contributions replaced by Haun.

"Silent Talking" was originally composed by Howe as a continuous piece connected to an instrumental titled "Seven Castles". Although Howe believed the track featured some of his finest guitar performances on the album, he felt dissatisfied that Anderson's vocals entered too early in the second half, cutting off his intended solo space. Haun ultimately re-recorded Howe's primary guitar riff, stating that he replaced the original part due to timing discrepancies while attempting to emulate Howe's signature guitar tone as closely as possible. Despite the extensive overdubs, several of Howe's secondary riffs were retained on the final mix, distinguishable from Haun's contributions by their distinct guitar tone.

"Angkor Wat", named after the ancient Cambodian temple, was written by Elias, Anderson, and Wakeman. During Wakeman's final day of recording, Elias requested that he track a series of atmospheric keyboard textures, which the production team subsequently layered to form the foundation of the piece. The track concludes with a poem recited in the Khmer language by Pauline Cheng.

"Elias would come in and tell me to make the tracks sound like 90125 ... Anderson would come in later and tell me to make them sound as far from 90125 as possible."

— Jim Crichton

"Dangerous (Look in the Light of What You're Searching For)" was written by Anderson and Elias. The final album arrangement remains controversial among the band members; Howe's original guitar tracking was completely removed from the final mix and replaced entirely by rhythm and lead contributions from Haun. Jim Crichton of Saga and his assistant, Brian Foraker, were tasked with filling structural gaps on the song, attempting to emulate parts they imagined Wakeman might play. Though Crichton felt the piece was initially an excellent demo, he considered its final, heavily altered album version substandard. Decades later, Howe included his original, unedited full-band backing track version on his compilation Anthology 2: Groups & Collaborations (2017) to demonstrate the stark contrast with the version released on Union.

"Holding On" was co-written by Anderson and Howe, though the final production severely restricted Howe's input; his actual performance on the track was limited by Elias to a brief 46 seconds containing the main guitar riff, with Haun performing the remaining lead and rhythm tracks.

"Evensong" is an instrumental duet for bass and percussion performed by Levin and Bruford, named after the evening prayer service held in Anglican churches. The piece originated as a section of their drum and bass duet performed during the Anderson Bruford Wakeman Howe tour.

"Take the Water to the Mountain" was composed solely by Anderson. He described the composition as a mystical piece concerning ancient knowledge and environmental restoration.

=== Yes tracks ===
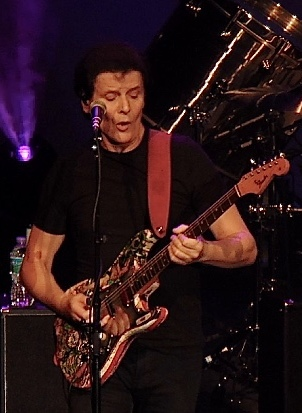
Guitarist and primary songwriter Trevor Rabin composed most of the material for the 1980s Yes faction tracks and mixed multiple versions of "Lift Me Up".

"Lift Me Up" was co-written by Rabin and Squire; during the songwriting process, both used a dictionary to locate suitable words for the lyrics, which led to the selection of the word "imperial" for the song's chorus. According to Rabin, the narrative concerns a homeless man who enters a restaurant solely to use the restroom, only to be forced out by the patrons, causing him to look toward the sky for assistance. Rabin completed two independent mixes of the track, but Arista Records founder Clive Davis disliked them. Following a suggestion from Squire to enlist outside help, Paul Fox was hired to finalise the mix with assistance from engineer Ed Thacker. Although Rabin considered Fox and Thacker's work to be highly competent, he ultimately maintained that his original mix was superior, arguing that the replacement production team lacked a clear understanding of his initial creative vision. Reflecting on the track in 1995, Rabin stated that the "dreadful" final mix made him cringe.

"Saving My Heart" was initially believed by Rabin to be unsuitable for a Yes album, a reservation he had previously held regarding the band's 1983 hit "Owner of a Lonely Heart". He had originally planned to develop the track as a collaboration with Roger Hodgson, but Anderson requested to work on the song after hearing its demo. Stylistically, the composition features a prominent pop reggae influence. Rabin ultimately expressed dissatisfaction with the final mix, maintaining that the production failed to capture his original artistic intent.

"Miracle of Life" was characterised by Rabin as a political protest song, with its lyrics directly inspired by a CNN television news report detailing the slaughter of dolphins in Denmark. Musically, the track features a complex, keyboard-heavy arrangement and intricate time signature changes that closely aligned with the band's traditional progressive rock style. Despite the overall fragmentation of the album's sessions, Howe praised the track, describing it as "very good."

"The More We Live – Let Go" is the first song co-written by Squire and Sherwood, with Sherwood performing all instruments except for the lead guitar and select vocal parts. Although Sherwood and producer Eddy Offord encouraged Squire to re-record the bass tracks from the original demo, Squire maintained that Sherwood's performance suited the composition perfectly and insisted it be retained. This choice caused ongoing studio arguments with Offord, who repeatedly pressured Squire to lay down a new bassline across several days of tracking. Rabin and Anderson subsequently overdubbed lead guitar and lead vocals, respectively. Sherwood recalled that the tracking process was so successful that he and Squire committed to a long-term songwriting partnership from that point forward. During these same sessions, the duo also wrote and recorded "Love Conquers All", a track featuring Rabin on lead vocals that was eventually released on the Yesyears (1991) box set, before later resurfacing on the self-titled debut album by their side project, Conspiracy.

== Artwork and packaging ==
The surrealist rock formations depicted on the cover were inspired by Roger Dean's series on the natural sandstone landscapes of the American Southwest, including regions in Utah and Arizona.

The band commissioned long-time collaborator Roger Dean to design the album's cover art and packaging. Prior to the project's consolidation, Dean had been developing a modernised text layout and a new square-shaped geometric emblem for the artwork of the second, unreleased Anderson Bruford Wakeman Howe studio album, which was operating under the working title Dialogue. When the project was abruptly shifted into a full Yes release, Dean elected to reinstate his classic, rounded "bubble" logo—originally designed in 1972—for the album's front cover to visually signal the return of the historic lineup, while utilising the newer square design variant in the packaging's margins. This square logo variant subsequently served as the central branding element for the box set Yesyears (1991), and later served as the primary logo on the front covers of the studio album The Ladder (1999) and the live release House of Yes: Live from House of Blues (2000).

The primary sleeve painting, titled The Guardians, features Dean's signature fantasy style, depicting a rocky, mountainous landscape under a vibrant sky. The piece was created as part of a painting series inspired by the natural rock formations and landscapes of Utah and Arizona, utilising exaggerated features alongside bold colours and strong shadows.

Contemporary music commentators noted that the return of Dean's distinctive visual identity served as a critical marketing tool for Arista, offering consumers a familiar aesthetic continuity that helped legitimise the cross-faction compilation as an authentic Yes release despite the highly fragmented nature of its recording sessions. Yes biographer Chris Welch observed a distinct irony between the record's commercial marketing and its actual creation. He argued that titling the project Union and cloaking the package in a classic, sprawling gatefold design by Dean served as a calculated corporate veneer, designed to project an image of artistic harmony that stood in complete contrast to the "hodge-podge" assembly and internal division defining the recording sessions.

== Release and commercial performance ==
Union was released on 30 April 1991 through Arista Records, issued concurrently across compact disc, vinyl LP, and cassette formats. The album experienced immediate commercial success, peaking at number seven on the UK Albums Chart during a six-week chart residency. In the United States, the album debuted on the Billboard 200 at number 35 before it rose to its peak position of number 15 the following week and ultimately remained on the chart for a total of 19 weeks. On 2 July 1991, the Recording Industry Association of America (RIAA) officially awarded the release a gold certification, signifying a shipment threshold of 500,000 units in the United States.

The album's critical profile was boosted in early 1992 when Howe's solo acoustic guitar track, "Masquerade", earned a Grammy Award nomination for Best Rock Instrumental Performance. Reflecting on the recognition in light of the severe internal tracking overrides, Howe characterised the nomination as "pure justice" for his isolated creative efforts.

=== Singles ===
Arista released three singles throughout 1991. The lead single, "Lift Me Up", was issued in April 1991 alongside a cinematic promotional music video directed by Steven Goldmann. The song became one of the most successful rock radio tracks of the band's career, achieving a consecutive six-week run at number one on the Billboard Album Rock Tracks chart from 4 May through 8 June 1991. The single also crossed over to mainstream Top 40 formats, peaking at number 86 on the Billboard Hot 100.

The second single, "Saving My Heart", was released in July 1991. Driven by its accessible, reggae-tinged layout, the track reached number nine on the Album Rock Tracks chart by mid-August. "I Would Have Waited Forever" was the third and final single, serviced primarily to rock radio stations as a promotional CD single asset.

== Critical reception ==
Professional ratings
Review scores
Source	Rating
AllMusic	2.5/5 stars
Entertainment Weekly	D+
Rolling Stone	2/5 stars
The Rolling Stone Album Guide	2/5 stars

Union received mixed to negative reviews from music critics upon release, who frequently criticised its disjointed nature and corporate-driven overproduction. The majority of the band members have since openly disowned the project; Bruford described it as the worst album of his career, while Wakeman famously nicknamed it Onion because it made him cry upon listening.

Writing for Rolling Stone, Chuck Eddy awarded the release two out of five stars, dismissing it as "an eclectic miscarriage that almost isn't even worth laughing about" while criticising the lack of cohesive guitar hooks, memorable riffs, and direct lyrical focus. British newspaper The Guardian published a negative review from Adam Sweeting, who considered the eight-member formation "severely over-manned" and the album "progressive pomp."

Robert Sandall of British magazine Q observed that the album "veers alarmingly between ... neurotically jumpy overarrangements and competing time signatures" from the ABWH camp and aggressive "heads-down riffing" from the 1980s Yes lineup. However, Sandall highlighted "Lift Me Up" as a rare "strong, anthemic" exception that survived the stylistic collision, ultimately considering the release to be "one of the least ridiculous Yes albums in recent memory." Dave DiMartino of Entertainment Weekly assigned the album a D+ rating, characterizing the record as a "stunningly wicked parody of an outlandish concept" and noting an overall sense of "complete and utter unlistenability." In The Washington Post, critic Gil Griffin wrote that the collective was "musically and conceptually reaching for its glorious past," selecting Howe's acoustic performance on "Masquerade" and Rabin's electric guitar work on "I Would Have Waited Forever" as standout highlights that captured the group's signature style.

Retrospective evaluations have remained critical. Bruce Eder of AllMusic noted that it was inherently difficult for the project to satisfy expectations given the vast concentration of musical talent involved. While he judged the underlying compositions to be "reasonably solid"—singling out the vocal arrangements on "I Would Have Waited Forever" and Howe's "Masquerade"—he dismissed "Lift Me Up" as a "forced exercise in heaviness" and labeled "Without Hope You Cannot Start the Day" a "composed-by-numbers" effort. In his historical overview of the genre, The Music's All that Matters, author Paul Stump described the record as "an unhappy testament to hubris, conceit and corporate expediency," arguing it "unintentionally embodies all the crimes that had been (often mistakenly) laid at the band's door hitherto." Stump maintained that the core concept was structurally flawed from its inception, as internal historical strife made any subtle artistic cooperation unrealistic. The music publication Ultimate Classic Rock subsequently ranked the release last in its comprehensive ranking of the Yes studio discography.

=== Band retrospection ===
The vast majority of the band members have openly disowned the album. Wakeman expressed intense dissatisfaction with the extensive revisions, reportedly throwing his first two copies of the album out of a limousine and his hotel room window. After some months to reflect on the album, Wakeman stated he was "one hundred percent unhappy with every piece of keyboard work." Consequently, he nicknamed the project Onion because it brought tears to his eyes every time he heard it. Rabin called the album a "black mark on the band", maintaining that 90125 (1983) and Big Generator (1987) were vastly superior efforts. Reflecting on the project in 2016, Rabin added: "I don't hate Union as much as Rick, but it was a peculiar record. It was instigated by Clive Davis and made largely in isolation by the musicians and Jon, so the title is misleading. To me, Union is more of a failed project than a real album." Bruford has remained the album's most severe internal critic, declaring: "It was probably not only the most dishonest title that I've ever had the privilege of playing drums underneath, but the single worst album I've ever recorded."

== Tour ==
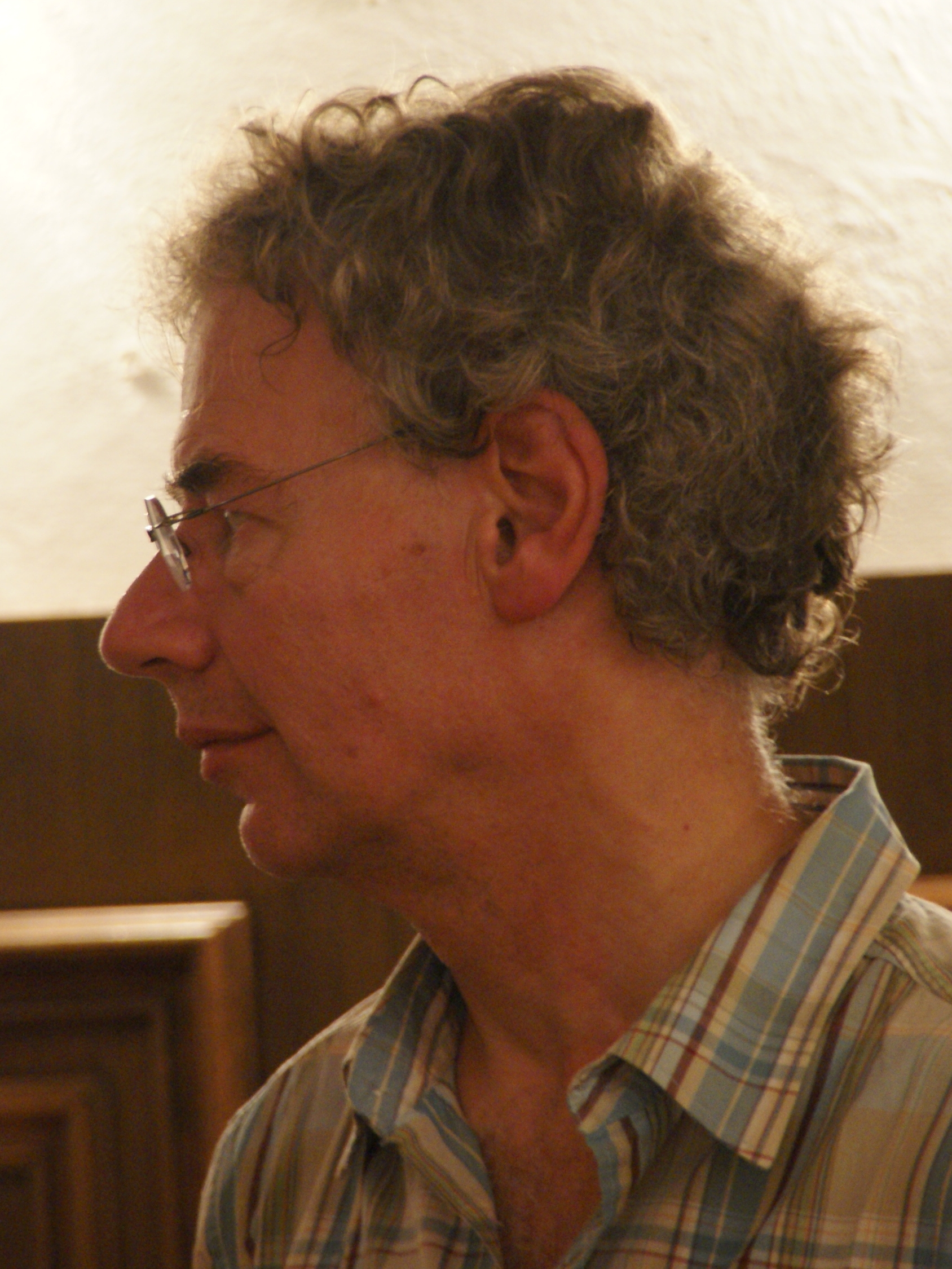
The 1991–1992 world tour marked drummer Bill Bruford's final involvement with Yes, concluding a legacy that began as the band's co-founding drummer in 1968.

The album's concert tour, commercially billed as Yesshows '91: Around the World in 80 Dates, spanned North America, Europe, and Japan across 84 dates from 9 April 1991 to 5 March 1992. It marked the first full-scale rock tour produced, advertised, and promoted by the Philadelphia-based firm Electric Factory Concerts (EFC). The logistical partnership developed following discussions between Anderson and EFC head Larry Magid, who learned that Anderson had been highly impressed by the presentation of ABWH's prior concert appearance in Philadelphia.

For the arena dates, the band utilised a custom-designed, central revolving stage positioned in the center of the venue floor, offering 360-degree audience visibility alongside a suspended lighting and sound system. This "in-the-round" production concept was an updated, technologically advanced version of a staging layout the group had pioneered during their 1978–1979 tour. Musically, coordinating the massive eight-member lineup required a strict division of live tracking duties. Drummers White and Bruford combined their setups, frequently alternating between acoustic and electronic percussion while performing an integrated drum duet. Similarly, Wakeman and Kaye divided the keyboard arrangements, with Kaye primarily executing traditional Hammond organ rhythms while Wakeman focused on intricate, multi-layered synthesizer leads.

Recordings and film footage compiled from various dates were released as the live package Union Live (2011). In May 2021, Gonzo Multimedia released Union 30 Live, a limited-edition 30-disc deluxe box set housed in a flight case to commemorate the 30th anniversary of the tour. The collection features a multi-camera DVD and a corresponding live album soundtrack from the band's performance at the Shoreline Amphitheatre on 8 August 1991, mixed by Rabin, alongside an assortment of soundboard desk tapes, FM radio broadcasts, and fan recordings.

In stark contrast to their hostile reflections on the studio album, the majority of the band members evaluated the tour positively. Wakeman later deemed the performances as the most enjoyable touring experience with the band. Conversely, Bruford described the venture as "ludicrous, really. For some of us, it was a very lucrative bit of fun; others needed it desperately." The fragile truce between the two factions dissolved immediately upon the tour's conclusion in 1992. The eight-man formation was permanently disbanded, as the expanded lineup was no longer required by record executives. For their next studio endeavor, Yes signed with Victory Music, a label that specifically requested the return of the band's most commercially successful 1980s formation. Consequently, the group officially reverted to the five-piece 1983–88 line-up of Anderson, Squire, White, Rabin, and Kaye.

== Track listing ==
Union track listing
No.	Title	Writer(s)	Producer(s)	Length
1.	"I Would Have Waited Forever"	Jon Anderson, Steve Howe, Jonathan Elias	Elias	6:32
2.	"Shock to the System"	Anderson, Howe, Elias	Elias	5:08
3.	"Masquerade"	Howe	Howe	2:16
4.	"Lift Me Up"	Trevor Rabin, Chris Squire	Rabin	6:29
5.	"Without Hope You Cannot Start the Day"	Anderson, Elias	Elias	5:16
6.	"Saving My Heart"	Rabin	Rabin	4:38
7.	"Miracle of Life"	Rabin, Mark Mancina	Rabin, Mancina, Eddy Offord	7:30
8.	"Silent Talking"	Anderson, Howe, Rick Wakeman, Bill Bruford, Elias	Elias	3:57
9.	"The More We Live – Let Go"	Squire, Billy Sherwood	Offord, Sherwood	4:53
10.	"Angkor Wat"	Anderson, Wakeman, Elias	Elias	5:23
11.	"Dangerous (Look in the Light of What You're Searching For)"	Anderson, Elias	Elias	3:37
12.	"Holding On"	Anderson, Elias, Howe	Elias	5:23
13.	"Evensong"	Tony Levin, Bruford	Elias	0:50
14.	"Take the Water to the Mountain"	Anderson	Elias	3:11
15.	"Give & Take" (European and Japanese editions bonus track)	Anderson, Howe, Elias	Elias	4:29
Total length:				69:58

== Personnel ==
Yes

- Jon Anderson – lead and backing vocals (all except tracks 3 and 13), acoustic guitar, percussion, associate producer
- Steve Howe – acoustic and electric guitars (tracks 1, 3, 8, 12, 15), production (track 3)
- Trevor Rabin – electric guitars, lead and backing vocals (tracks 4, 6, 7, 9), production (tracks 4, 6, 7), engineering (track 9)
- Chris Squire – harmony and backing vocals (tracks 1, 2, 4–7, 9, 11), bass (tracks 4, 6, 7)
- Tony Kaye – Hammond B-3 organ, piano (tracks 4, 6, 7, 9)
- Rick Wakeman – keyboards (tracks 1, 2, 5, 8, 10–12, 14, 15)
- Bill Bruford – acoustic and electric drums, percussion (tracks 1, 2, 5, 8, 11–15)
- Alan White – acoustic drums and percussion (tracks 4, 6, 7, 9)

Additional personnel

- Jonathan Elias – keyboards, synthesizers, backing vocals, production
- Tony Levin – bass (tracks 1, 2, 5, 8, 11, 12, 14, 15), Chapman Stick (track 13)
- Jimmy Haun – electric and acoustic guitars (tracks 1, 2, 5, 8, 11, 12, 14, 15), bass (track 2)
- Billy Sherwood – bass, keyboards, guitars, programming, backing vocals, co-producer (track 9)
- Allan Schwartzberg – acoustic percussion
- Gary Barlough – synthesizer
- Jerry Bennett – synthesizer, synth percussion
- Jim Crichton – synthesizer (track 11)
- Pauline Cheng – Khmer recitation (track 10)
- Gary Falcone – backing vocals
- Deborah Anderson – backing vocals
- Ian Lloyd – backing vocals
- Tommy Funderburk – backing vocals
- Sherman Foote – synthesizer
- Brian Foraker – synthesizer programming
- Chris Fosdick – synthesizer
- Rory Kaplan – synthesizer programming
- Alex Lasarenko – synthesizer
- Steve Porcaro – keyboards, synthesizer programming
- Michael Sherwood – backing vocals
- Danny Vaughn – backing vocals

Technical personnel

- Eddy Offord – producer, mixer (track 9)
- Mark Mancina – producer, programming
- Brian Foraker – engineer, mixer
- Chris Fosdick – additional engineering (track 10)
- Buzz Borrowes – assistant engineer
- Sophie Masson – assistant engineer
- Richard Edwards – assistant engineer
- Renny Hill – assistant engineer
- Matt Gruber – assistant engineer
- Michael Sweet – assistant engineer
- Paul Berry – assistant engineer
- Steve Wellner – assistant engineer
- Lolly Grodner – assistant engineer
- Susan Kent – production coordinator
- Paul Fox – mixer
- Ed Thacker – mixer
- Mike Shipley – mixer
- Steve Harrison – assistant engineer
- Stan Katayama – engineering
- Greg Calbi – mastering
- Roger Dean – design and paintings
- Carolyn Quan – art director
- Kai Krause – computer graphics

== Charts ==
Chart (1991)	Peak position
Canada Top Albums/CDs (RPM)	15
Dutch Albums (Album Top 100)	17
Finnish Albums (The Official Finnish Charts)	21
German Albums (Offizielle Top 100)	15
Hungarian Albums (MAHASZ)	37
Japanese Albums (Oricon)	11
Swedish Albums (Sverigetopplistan)	32
Swiss Albums (Schweizer Hitparade)	16
UK Albums (Official Charts)	7
US Billboard 200	15

== Certifications ==
Region	Certification	Certified units/sales
United States (RIAA)	Gold	500,000^{^}
^{^} Shipments figures based on certification alone.
