= Milton McDonald =

British musician

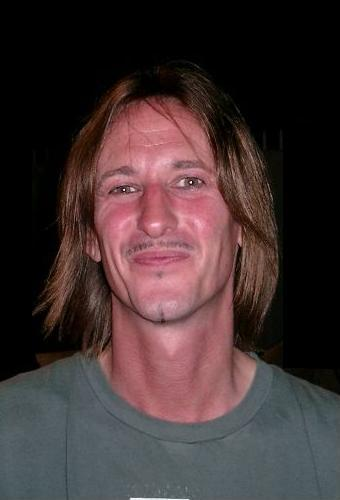
McDonald in 2004

Mike "Milton" McDonald is a session guitarist. He has played with Patricia Kaas, Anderson Bruford Wakeman Howe, Spice Girls, S Club 7, Ray Davies, Take That, Robert Palmer, M People, Louise, Mick Jagger, Tina Turner, Atomic Kitten, Hear'Say, Mylène Farmer, and Girls Aloud.

McDonald also played for All Saints, Rick Astley, Jon Anderson, Bryan Adams, Blue, B*Witched, Gary Barlow, Bb Mak, Beverley Knight, Jocelyn Brown, Boyzone, Victoria Beckham, Bellefire, Ed Case, Alice Cooper, Drizabone, Eternal, Five, Eddie Floyd, Gabrielle, Gareth Gates, Geri Halliwell, Gianna Nannini (Italy) Deni Hines, Steve Harley, innosense, Brian Kennedy, Chaka Khan, Ronan Keating, Liberty X, Lulu, Martine Mccutcheon, Mel C, Melissa Mars, 911, Billy Ocean, Alexander O'Neal, Mica Paris, Billie Piper, Roachford, Skin (Skunk Anansie), Lucie Silvas, Sugababes, 3 Blind Mice, Westlife, Bill Wyman, Wet Wet Wet, Yes, Will Young, Eikichi Yazawa and Kumiko Yamashita.

Mike "Milton" McDonald—"Milton" because he came from Milton Keynes — was a member of The Boomerang Gang, who appeared on the London scene in 1984. McDonald left the band in late 1986. He was the second guitarist to Yes offshoot Anderson Bruford Wakeman Howe, both on their studio album and on tour. He has subsequently continued with a life of session work, often working with UK pop producers Absolute.

McDonald toured with British pop act Take That between 1992 until their split in 1996, then played for a variety of British, European and Japanese artists before rejoining Take That for their sell-out Ultimate Tour in 2006, and subsequent tours. In 2009 he appeared on Ray Davies’ album The Kinks Choral Collection and featured in the house band for Children In Need Rocks the Royal Albert Hall, playing guitar for Shirley Bassey, Dizzee Rascal, Annie Lennox, Paolo Nutini, Take That, Leona Lewis and Robbie Williams.

Milton McDonald replaced Rob Harris, guitarist for Jamiroquai, for a concert in Almaty, Kazakhstan, on 15 September 2012.

Milton played guitar for the finale of the Radio 2 "Festival in a day" concert alongside Jeff Lynne's ELO, Richard Tandy, Mike Stevens and the BBC Concert Orchestra on Sunday, 14 September 2014.

Together with his wife, Melanie Lewis-McDonald, he is a touring member of Jeff Lynne's ELO, as backing vocals and guitar.

In August 2021 he released the single 'Breathe', featuring Melanie Lewis-McDonald.
