= Magnification (album) =

Studio album by Yes
- Released: 10 September 2001
- Recorded: 2001
- Studios: Santa Barbara Sound Design (Santa Barbara, California)
- Genres: Symphonic rock; progressive rock
- Length: 60:27
- Labels: Eagle (UK); Beyond (US)
- Producers: Yes; Tim Weidner

Yes chronology
Keystudio (2001)	Magnification (2001)	Symphonic Live (2002)

Magnification is the 19th studio album by the English progressive rock band Yes, released on 10 September 2001 by Eagle Records. It is their only album recorded both as a four-piece band and without a keyboardist (though drummer Alan White plays piano on select tracks), and their last album to feature founding member and lead vocalist Jon Anderson. Following the departure of keyboardist Igor Khoroshev, the band decided to record a new studio album with orchestral arrangements for the first time since Time and a Word (1970). The album was recorded and mixed using Pro Tools with producer Tim Weidner and orchestral arrangements by Larry Groupé conducting the San Diego Symphony Orchestra.

Magnification received mixed reviews from music critics upon release and became one of the band's lowest selling albums, reaching number 71 on the UK Albums Chart and number 186 on the Billboard 200. Its North American release featured a simultaneous release on CD and DVD-Audio formats, the latter with a 5.1 surround sound mix. The album was reissued several times from 2001 to 2004, each with a bonus disc containing previously unreleased live tracks. Yes promoted the album with their Yes Symphonic Tour that covered the United States and Europe which featured the band, touring with keyboardist Tom Brislin, and an orchestra on stage.

== Background ==
In August 2000, the Yes line-up of singer Jon Anderson, bassist Chris Squire, guitarist Steve Howe, drummer Alan White, and keyboardist Igor Khoroshev, finished their three-month Masterworks Tour across the United States. The tour was met with controversy when Khoroshev was involved in a backstage incident making repeated unwanted advances towards two female security guards. He was later charged with assault and battery and sexual battery, both misdemeanours. Reports of Khoroshev being loud and verbally abusive at his hotel were also made. The incident led to Khoroshev's departure at the tour's conclusion, leaving the band reduced to a four-piece and without a keyboardist.

As the band discussed their next move in the latter half of 2000, one aspect covered was their future touring plans which included the idea of playing dates with an orchestra on stage. This sparked an interest from all four members who felt it was a good time to pursue such a musical direction, leading to the decision of recording a new studio album with an orchestra incorporated into their music. Anderson was surprised that Squire and White agreed as he felt the two were always in favour of a heavier rock sound. The undertaking marked the first time the band had worked with an orchestra since their second album, Time and a Word (1970). The band shared their idea with their fans when in January 2001, an online vote had been posted on their official website asking them if they wish to see their next tour include an orchestra. Before the album was recorded, Anderson had decided upon the title Magnification regardless of its style or musical content. The idea behind the title and the album itself, he explained, "eventually became the idea to magnify everything that's good around you in order to magnify everything that is good within".

== Production ==
=== Recording ===
In early February 2001, Yes entered Santa Barbara Sound Design, a recording studio in Santa Barbara, California, to work on a group of demos they had come up with for the album. With Howe based in England, he arrived at the studio after the rest had settled and found they already had "industriously started writing music" in a similar fashion to when he flew over to work on Keys to Ascension (1996), which made him proud. English engineer and producer Tim Weidner, known for his association with former Yes singer and producer Trevor Horn and artist Seal, was brought in to work on the album at Howe's suggestion as he had worked on his third solo album Turbulence (1991) and praised his approach. By July 2001, the album's title was decided upon.

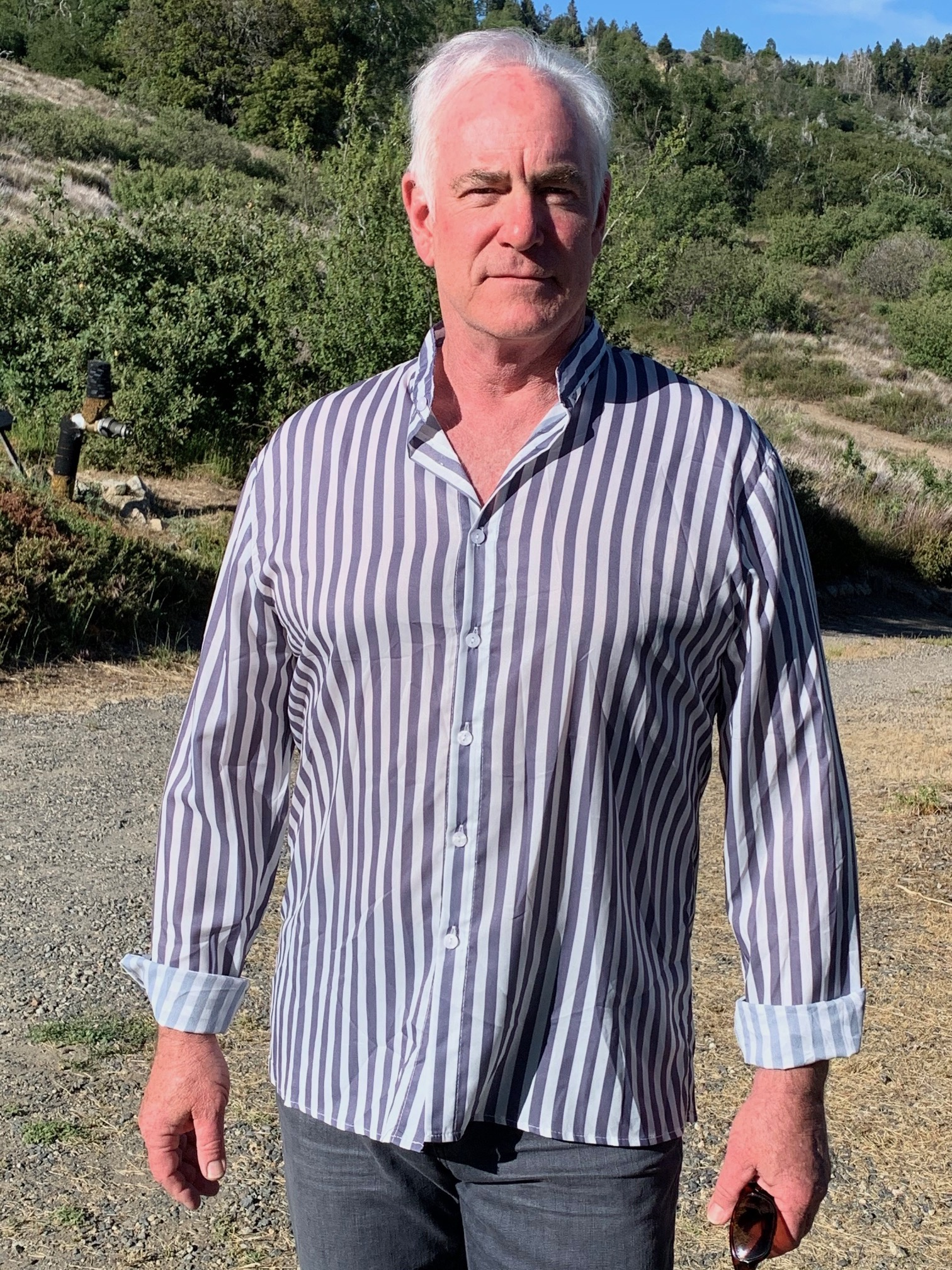
Larry Groupé

To handle the orchestral arrangements, Chris Squire initially approached former Yes member Trevor Rabin, who expressed some interest in looking at the initial music but was ultimately unable to commit due to being busy with writing film scores. Yes then employed American conductor, composer, and arranger Larry Groupé, a longtime Yes fan since his school days who got word of their plans to possibly make record and tour with an orchestra and got in touch with their management. When Groupé's name was suggested to the band, Anderson listened to his arrangements on the soundtrack to the drama film The Contender (2000) and enjoyed his musical style and use of harmonies. After several meetings with management Groupé finally met the band who after several days observing their work in the studio, supplied him a digital audio tape of three demos they had recorded and returned ten days later with orchestrations he had written for them using computer and keyboard samples at his home studio. It was a success, and Groupé worked on the remainder of the album, "doing more new things, adding different harmonies, Moog counterpoints, putting overtures in front of pieces", and conducted the final orchestral arrangements with the San Diego Symphony Orchestra. Anderson pitched ideas for the orchestral arrangements and places in the songs where he wished for them to be by playing a MIDI guitar, a process Howe found intriguing.

Around a week into the recording process, Weidner convinced the band to switch from using a 48-track analogue machine to digital recording with him operating the digital audio workstation software Pro Tools, and Pro Control for mixing. Both parties found that analogue became difficult to work in as the many changes in arrangements during the song development stage made tape editing increasingly impractical. Weidner recalled some scepticism from the group initially, but got into the process after they realised how flexible the digital system was. Two separate instances of the program were used to record the band and the other to compile and process what was put down. The orchestra was recorded across 40 tracks, causing these tracks to be mixed first prior to the main mixing process. Weidner recalled that lyrics and musical arrangements would change daily and roughly 300 GB of audio had been recorded at its completion. As the stereo mixes were finished, the band agreed to have Weidner use the tracks to create a new mix in 5.1 surround sound which he did with considerable ease using the software. The process allowed him to take advantage of space and not be faced with the constant challenge of Howe's guitars clashing with the orchestra. The majority of effects done on the vocal tracks were done with the Reverb One and Echo Farm TDM plug-ins. In May 2001, the vocals, guitars, and necessary overdubs were finished.

Howe entered the project with enthusiasm which soon turned into caution. He later revealed that the album was a problematic one to make, and claimed it was only completed through the "relentless efforts" from executive producer Jordan Berliant, Weidner, and himself. Though he said the album contained too much music on the disc, he nonetheless said that the band "did get it right" when the project was complete. As the album was being made, Howe became aware that the orchestra would affect his sound and style of playing which he described as "a bit of a rude awakening". He also disliked having to restrict his playing in order to accommodate the orchestral passages. With Magnification being the first album to feature him as the sole guitarist since Keys to Ascension 2 (1997), he was pleased with the absence of another player interfering. Having finished his acoustic solo album Natural Timbre (2001) two weeks prior to working on Magnification, Howe realised he was "carrying a lot of expertise" in regard to the acoustic guitar which greatly influenced his acoustic playing on it, leading to "some good pictures" as a result. After being unhappy that his guitar was minimised in the first mix of the album, Howe insisted on—and got—a second mix which satisfied him.

=== Songs ===
"Can You Imagine" features Squire on lead vocals with Anderson on backing vocals. It was originally recorded as a demo in 1981 for the proposed supergroup XYZ featuring Squire, White, and Jimmy Page. "In the Presence Of" originated from a passage that White played on a piano in the studio which Anderson noticed and wished to develop it further for the album. White came up with it "in the middle of the night" several years prior to recording. One track features Squire and White playing an organ together and was recorded in a recording session that White recalled was particularly funny. White agreed with an interviewer that some of the lyrics in "Spirit of Survival" were uncharacteristically dark and what he described as "pretty eerie", particularly in the wake of the September 11 attacks that occurred on the album's scheduled release day in North America.

=== Artwork ===
In a departure from their previous four albums, the cover art for Magnification was not designed by English artist Roger Dean. Despite producing "a lot of work" for the album, Dean claimed the record company did not present his art to the band; Howe says that Anderson insisted that Dean not be offered the commission.

In the end, the group went with a design by Bob Cesca which features the logo Dean designed in 1972. Howe calls it "a lacklustre dull and dark image that did nothing but disappoint the fans and me." In 2021, Cesca released a 20th anniversary special edition of the Magnification cover art.

== Release ==
Professional ratings
Review scores
Source	Rating
AllMusic	3/5 stars
The New York Post	(positive)
The Rolling Stone Album Guide	2/5 stars

Magnification was released on 10 September 2001 by Eagle Records in the United Kingdom, under a license agreement between Beyond Music and the band's company, Yes LLC. It was originally scheduled for release in North America by Beyond and Yes LLC on 11 September 2001, however plans were affected following the terrorist attacks that occurred in New York City on the same day. As a result, the release was rescheduled for 4 December 2001. Chances of the album's success were hampered further after Beyond Music went out of business one month after it was put out. Magnification reached number 71 on the UK Albums Chart and number 186 on the Billboard 200 and lasted one week on both charts. In the wake of the September attacks, Yes offered "We Agree" as a free download as a tribute to those affected.

Longtime New York Post music critic Dan Aquilante wrote a positive review of the album for the newspaper and described what Yes sounded like with an orchestra: "Uplifting, optimistic music that's lush without the mush". He concluded the album may change the mind of those who had "said no to Yes" in the past. Howard Cohen gave the album two stars out of five for The Knight Ridder Tribune and thought that despite the lack of a "killer tune" on it, he rates it as one of the band's more listenable releases. In her review for Dayton Daily News, Lisa Knodel believed the album is a "delight" for fans of the band and went so far to call it "groundbreaking". She thought Larry Groupé's arrangements "create drama, painting a musical landscape for the mind and moving from moments of inner peace and chaos" which helped the group avoid creating "elevator music". Knodel picked "Magnification", "We Agree", and "Give Love Each Day" as stand out tracks.

=== Reissues ===
The album has been reissued five times. In 2001, it was released in its standard version and three two-disc limited editions in the US, each version sold in Borders, Best Buy, and F.Y.E. (Trans World Entertainment) retail locations, respectively. Each bonus disc contains different live tracks recorded on the Masterworks and Yessymphonic Tours. A new two-disc Special Edition of the album was released in June 2002 in the United Kingdom with alternate artwork, the second disc being a HDCD CD-ROM containing further live tracks, the promotional video to "Don't Go", a live performance of "The Gates of Delirium" from the Yessymphonic Tour, and an interview with Anderson. In the United States, a version on DVD-Audio with a 5.1 surround sound mix was released by Rhino Records on 30 July 2002, containing extended sleeve notes and bonus audio and video content. Magnification was included in the Yes compilation album Essentially Yes (2006).

== Tour ==
Yes supported Magnification with their Yessymphonic Tour of North America and Europe between July and December 2001 with the band accompanied by an orchestra for each show. The tour marked the band's first ever concerts in Russia. Time was limited, leaving preparations with the live orchestra to begin while the album was still being mixed. The North American leg featured a different orchestra at each concert, while the European leg had the European Festival Orchestra, formed of young musicians, touring with the band with conductor Wilhelm Keitel. The first several gigs of the tour featured Groupé as conductor. To play the necessary keyboard passages in the setlist, the band hired American keyboardist Tom Brislin. "Magnification", "Don't Go", and "In the Presence Of" were performed live, the latter receiving a particularly welcoming response from audiences; to Howe, "like a classic Yes number".

The two shows at Heineken Music Hall in Amsterdam were recorded which was released as the 2002 DVD and 2009 CD Symphonic Live, the video directed by Aubrey Powell of Hipgnosis. Former Yes keyboardist Rick Wakeman was invited to perform with the band for the recording of Symphonic Live, but he declined as he already had gigs booked in South America. He rejoined the group in April 2002.

== Track listing ==
All songs by Jon Anderson, Steve Howe, Chris Squire and Alan White.

No.	Title	Length
1.	"Magnification"	7:15
2.	"Spirit of Survival"	6:01
3.	"Don't Go"	4:26
4.	"Give Love Each Day"	7:43
5.	"Can You Imagine"	2:58
6.	"We Agree"	6:30
7.	"Soft As a Dove"	2:17
8.	"Dreamtime"	10:45
9.	"In the Presence Of"; I. "Deeper"; II. "Death of Ego"; III. "True Beginner"; IV. "Turn Around and Remember"	10:24
10.	"Time Is Time"	2:08
Total length:		60:27

== Personnel ==
Credits adapted from the album's liner notes.

Yes

- Jon Anderson – lead vocals, MIDI guitar, backing vocals on "Can You Imagine"
- Steve Howe – acoustic and electric guitars, pedal steel guitar, backing vocals
- Chris Squire – bass guitar, lead vocals on "Can You Imagine", backing vocals
- Alan White – drums, percussion, piano, backing vocals

Additional musicians

- Larry Groupé – conducting, orchestral composition and arrangements
- San Diego Symphony Orchestra
- Igor Khoroshev – keyboards ("Close to the Edge", "Ritual", and "The Gates of Delirium" on the editions with bonus live material)
- Tom Brislin – keyboards ("Long Distance Runaround" on the editions with bonus live material)

Production

- Yes – production
- Tim Weidner – production, engineering, mixing
- Nick Sevilla – additional engineering
- John Elder – additional engineering
- Steve MacMillan – mixing
- Kris Solem – mastering at Future Disc
- Bruce Donnelly – orchestral arrangements
- Frank Macchia – orchestral arrangements
- Larry Czoka – copyist
- Brent Heflin McHenry – music preparation
- Charlie Bouis – orchestra recording
- The Left Bank Management Organization – management
- Bob Cesca – artwork
- Roger Dean – original Yes logo design
- Jordan Berliant – executive producer

== Charts ==
Chart (2001–02)	Peak position
German Albums (Offizielle Top 100)	64
Dutch Albums (Album Top 100)	81
Scottish Albums (Official Charts)	57
UK Albums (Official Charts)	71
UK Independent Albums (Official Charts)	48
UK Rock & Metal Albums (Official Charts)	8
US Billboard 200	186
