= Rick Wakeman's Greatest Hits =

Studio album by Rick Wakeman
- Released: December 1993
- Recorded: September 1992 – May 1993; Bajonor Studios, Isle of Man
- Genre: Progressive rock
- Length: 2:03:00
- Label: Herald, Fragile Records, Caroline Records
- Producer: Rick Wakeman

Professional ratings
Review scores
Source	Rating
Allmusic	1.5/5 stars

Rick Wakeman's Greatest Hits is an album by Rick Wakeman.

Despite what the title suggests, this is not a compilation album but instead one of re-makes of solo songs as well as covers of Yes. These are all instrumental versions and were only done with keyboards, guitar, bass and drums.

Most of the remakes of his solo work (11 out of 15) are from Journey to the Centre of the Earth.

== Track listing ==
Disc one - Yes covers
No.	Title	Writer(s)	Length
1.	"Roundabout"	Jon Anderson, Steve Howe	13:12
2.	"Wonderous Stories"	Anderson	7:46
3.	"Don't Kill the Whale"	Chris Squire, Anderson	4:02
4.	"Going For The One"	Anderson	7:14
5.	"Siberian Khatru"	Anderson, Wakeman, Howe	12:37
6.	"Madrigal"	Anderson, Wakeman	4:06
7.	"Starship Trooper"	Anderson	12:31

Disc two
No.	Title	Length
1.	"The Journey Overture"	2:01
2.	"The Journey"	4:00
3.	"The Hansbach"	4:11
4.	"Lost In Time"	3:49
5.	"The Recollection"	2:57
6.	"Stream Of Voices"	1:54
7.	"The Battle"	4:29
8.	"Liddenbrook"	4:16
9.	"The Forest"	2:49
10.	"Mount Etna"	3:50
11.	"Journey's End"	3:38
12.	"Sea Horses"	6:55
13.	"Catherine Of Aragon" (From: The Six Wives Of Henry VIII")	4:03
14.	"Gone But Not Forgotten"	5:51
15.	"Merlin The Magician" (From: "The Myths And Legends Of King Arthur & The Knights Of The Round Table")	6:36

== Recording ==
Each disc was recorded in a different year. Disc 1 (Yes covers) was recorded from March–May 1993 while disc 2 was recorded from September–October 1992.

== Personnel ==
- Rick Wakeman - keyboards
- Dave Winter - guitars
- Tony Fernandez - drums
- Alan Thompson - bass

=== Production ===
- Stuart Sawney - engineer, mixer
- Roger Dean - artwork
