= Keys to Ascension (video) =

Video by Yes
- Released: October 1996
- Recorded: 4–6 March 1996
- Venue: Fremont Theatre, San Luis Obispo, California, US
- Genre: Progressive rock
- Label: CMC International

Yes chronology
Live in Philadelphia (1995)	Keys to Ascension (1996)	House of Yes: Live from House of Blues (2000)

Keys to Ascension is a video album by English progressive rock band Yes, released in October 1996 by CMC International. It featured the group's performances at the Fremont Theatre in San Luis Obispo, California in March 1996, following the return of guitarist Steve Howe and keyboardist Rick Wakeman in 1995, which marked the first performances of the band's "classic" line-up since 1979. The three concerts with the newly reunited lineup were followed by two double albums entitled Keys to Ascension and Keys to Ascension 2, featuring all new material alongside live tracks from the San Luis Obispo shows. This along with these companion albums were reissued in 2010 as the Keys to Ascension box set.

Howe oversaw the mixing of the audio for the video. According to him, there are some sections where the audio does not entirely match what is being played on screen since the band recorded all three of its shows the Fremont, but only the last night was filmed, and during the mixing they sometimes dubbed in audio from an earlier show if it was played better than the last one. He blamed this in part on the budget for filming being only $6,000, far less than what might normally have been spent to produce a quality video.

A world tour was abruptly cancelled when Wakeman quit the band in mid-1997. He rejoined the band in 2002.

== Track listing ==
1. Siberian Khatru
2. Close to the Edge
  I. "The Solid Time of Change"
  II. "Total Mass Retain"
  III. "I Get Up, I Get Down"
  IV. "Seasons of Man"
3. I've Seen All Good People
  a. "Your Move"
  b. "All Good People"
4. Time and a Word
5. And You and I
  I. "Cord of Life"
  II. "Eclipse"
  III. "The Preacher, The Teacher"
  IV. "Apocalypse"
6. The Revealing Science of God (Dance of the Dawn)
7. Going for the One
8. Turn of the Century
9. America
10. Onward
11. Awaken
12. Roundabout
13. Starship Trooper
  a. "Life Seeker"
  b. "Disillusion"
  c. "Würm"

== Personnel ==
- Jon Anderson: vocals, guitars, harp, percussion
- Steve Howe: 6- and 12-string electric and acoustic guitars, steel and pedal steel, vocals
- Chris Squire: bass guitar, vocals
- Rick Wakeman: keyboards
- Alan White: drums, vocals
