= Ambient Den (album) =

2025 studio album by Ambient Den

Studio album by Ambient Den
- Released: 28 July 2025
- Genre: Progressive rock, space rock
- Length: 47:36
- Label: Desert Comb Music
- Producer: Ben Craven

Ambient Den is the debut studio album by Australian progressive rock band Ambient Den, released on 28 July 2025 via Desert Comb Music. The album is a concept record centred on humanity's search for a new home beyond Earth, culminating in the terraforming of a distant planet.

== Background ==
The album was written and recorded following the formation of Ambient Den during the COVID-19 lockdown period. Songwriting was collaborative, with guitarist Ben Craven producing all tracks.

== Music and composition ==
Ambient Den incorporates elements of progressive rock and space rock, featuring long-form compositions, instrumental passages, and layered synthesiser textures. Reviewers have noted the album's balance between classic progressive rock influences and contemporary production.

== Release ==
The album was released on 28 July 2025. It is available on CD, Vinyl and Digital Download.

== Critical reception ==
The album received coverage and generally favourable reviews from progressive rock publications. Critics highlighted its cohesive concept, atmospheric production, and extended compositions, with several reviews drawing attention to the track "Terraforming" for its length and compositional scope.

== Track listing ==
No.	Title	Length
1.	"Future History – Part 1"	1:48
2.	"For All Mankind"	8:16
3.	"Provenance"	5:58
4.	"Earthrise"	9:16
5.	"Terraforming"	16:31
6.	"Future History – Part 2"	5:47
Total length:		47:36

Bonus tracks
No.	Title	Length
1.	"For All Mankind (single edit)"	5:46
2.	"Earthrise (single edit)"	4:41
3.	"Terraforming (single edit)"	4:25
4.	"Future History – Part 2 (single edit)"	4:27

The standard CD edition includes four bonus single-edit tracks not present on the vinyl edition.

== Personnel ==
- Ben Craven – guitars, bass, programming, vocals, production
- Tim Bennetts – keyboards, vocals
- Dean Povey – drums, percussion, vocals
