= House of Yes: Live from House of Blues =

Live album by Yes
- Released: 25 September 2000
- Recorded: 31 October 1999
- Venues: House of Blues at Mandalay Bay; Las Vegas, Nevada, United States
- Genre: Progressive rock
- Length: 111:21
- Labels: Eagle; Beyond Music

Yes chronology
The Ladder (1999)	House of Yes: Live from House of Blues (2000)	Keystudio (2001)

Yes video chronology
Keys to Ascension (1996)	House of Yes: Live from House of Blues (2000)	Symphonic Live (2002)

Professional ratings
Review scores
Source	Rating
AllMusic [CD]	2.5/5 stars
AllMusic [Video/DVD]	4.5/5 stars
PopMatters	7/10
The Rolling Stone Album Guide	1/5 stars

House of Yes: Live from House of Blues is a live album and video by the English progressive rock band Yes, released on 25 September 2000 by Eagle Records in the United Kingdom and by Beyond Music in the United States. It is a recording of the band's performance at the House of Blues at Mandalay Bay in Las Vegas on 31 October 1999 during their world tour supporting their eighteenth studio album The Ladder. By the time of the album's release, guitarist Billy Sherwood and keyboardist Igor Khoroshev were already out of the band, reducing Yes to a four-piece.

The album peaked at No. 154 on the UK Albums Chart and failed to chart in the US. A DVD of the concert was also released in 2000.

== Track listing ==
CD One
No.	Title	Writer(s)	Length
1.	"Yours Is No Disgrace"	Jon Anderson, Chris Squire, Steve Howe, Tony Kaye, Bill Bruford	13:03
2.	"Time And A Word"	Anderson, David Foster	0:58
3.	"Homeworld (The Ladder)"	Anderson, Howe, Billy Sherwood, Squire, Alan White, Igor Khoroshev	9:44
4.	"Perpetual Change"	Anderson, Squire	10:48
5.	"Lightning Strikes"	Anderson, Howe, Sherwood, Squire, White, Khoroshev	5:07
6.	"The Messenger"	Anderson, Howe, Sherwood, Squire, White, Khoroshev	6:39
7.	"Ritual (Nous Sommes Du Soleil)"	Anderson, Howe, Squire, Rick Wakeman, White	0:59
8.	"And You and I"	Anderson, Bruford, Howe, Squire	11:22

CD Two
No.	Title	Writer(s)	Length
1.	"It Will Be A Good Day (The River)"	Anderson, Howe, Sherwood, Squire, White, Khoroshev	6:28
2.	"Face To Face"	Anderson, Howe, Sherwood, Squire, White, Khoroshev	5:32
3.	"Awaken"	Anderson, Howe	17:34
4.	"Your Move / I've Seen All Good People"	Anderson, Squire	7:27
5.	"Cinema"	Squire, Trevor Rabin, White, Kaye	1:57
6.	"Owner of a Lonely Heart"	Rabin, Anderson, Squire, Trevor Horn	6:03
7.	"Roundabout"	Anderson, Howe	7:40

== Personnel ==
Yes

- Jon Anderson – lead vocals
- Steve Howe – lead and acoustic guitars, steel guitar, backing vocals
- Billy Sherwood – guitars, backing vocals
- Chris Squire – bass guitars, backing vocals
- Alan White – drums, percussion, backing vocals
- Igor Khoroshev – keyboards, backing vocals

Production

- Biff Dawes – engineer
- Kris Solem – mastering
- Mike Plotnikoff – mixing
- Roger Dean – artwork, cover
- Martyn Dean – design
- Gottlieb Bros. – photography
- Robin Kauffman – photography
