= Tim Weidner =

Tim Weidner is an engineer and producer, best known for his work with Trevor Horn.

== Biography ==
Weidner has produced for Dead or Alive. He has done mixing for artists including Seal, Mike Oldfield (Tubular Bells II), Art of Noise, Captain and Gun. He has been an engineer for artists including Seal (including the US #1 single "Kiss from a Rose"), John Legend, Tina Turner, Cher, Jordin Sparks, LeAnn Rimes and David Cook. He also worked on albums including Escala. He played bass on Marc Almond's Tenement Symphony and David Jordan's Set the Mood, and contributed percussion and programming to Billy Idol's Kings & Queens of the Underground.

He produced Yes's album Magnification, at the suggestion of guitarist Steve Howe, with whom he had worked on Howe's Turbulence solo album. He also did a Surround Sound mix for a DVD-A re-release of Yes's Fragile. Weidner subsequently mixed and engineered Yes's Fly from Here album, produced by Horn.

In 1995, Weidner was co-nominated in the Best Engineered Album, Non-Classical section at the 37th Annual Grammy Awards for engineering work on Seal's 1994 album Seal.
