= White (band) =

Progressive rock band

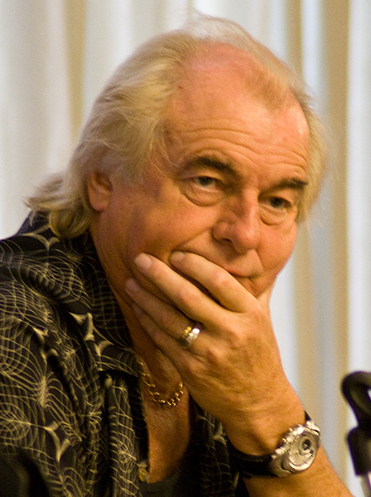
- Band leader, Alan White in 2010

Background information
- Genres: Progressive rock
- Years active: 2005–2022
- Past members: Alan White (died 2022); Kevin Currie; Ted Stockwell; Geoff Downes; Robyn Dawn; Steve Boyce; Karl Haug; Jonathan Sindelman
- Website: Whitemusic.net

White was a progressive rock band formed by Alan White in 2005.

== History ==
Alan White had achieved success in his role as the drummer with Yes, as well as having worked with John Lennon, George Harrison and Joe Cocker. Between tours with Yes, Alan formed a friendship with Seattle-based band, MerKaBa. He had also got to know another local band, Treason, and guested on their eponymous 1997 debut album. Alan began playing shows with MerKaBa and through his friendship with MerKaBa bassist, Steve Boyce, began working on a new album, along with Wayo Hogan, Kevin Currie, keyboardist Ted Stockwell (of Treason), and guitarist Karl Haug.

The MerKaBa identity was dropped and the band took on the new name of White. An album was completed in mid-2004 with Stockwell on keys to have been called New Day (tracks: "Fate", "The Way You See Me", "DreamAway", "New Day", "Shine", "Up", "Loyal", "Rite of Rain", "Mighty Love", "Burn All the Maps", "Waterhole (I'll Come Around)") and the band played a small number of live dates in the Seattle area. However, the band and Stockwell split and the album was not released. Geoff Downes, who had previously worked with Alan White in Yes, joined in April 2005 and the entire album was re-recorded, re-working songs from New Day and adding new material.

The More Drama Tour, a joint tour, with White, The Syn, Steve Howe and a joint set with Howe, Squire and White together, was planned for 2005, but belatedly cancelled.

The album White was released in 2006, with Alan White, Kevin Currie, Steve Boyce, Karl Haug and Geoff Downes. Occasional live work followed, but Downes left the band given other commitments. The band continued, with a number of replacement keyboardists, including Phil Davis. Former MerKaBa member, Richard "Wayo" Hogan, also worked with them in 2006.

After a period of inactivity, White returned with a new line-up and occasional live work, again in the Seattle area, in September 2010 and beyond. The line-up retained Alan White (drums, percussion, backing vocals), Karl Haug (guitars, backing vocals) and Steve Boyce (bass, guitar, backing vocals), who were joined by two musicians from the Yes tribute band Parallels (who have previously worked with Alan White): Robyn Dawn (vocals) and Jonathan Sindelman (keys). Live, set lists included material by Yes and John Lennon.

Alan White died in 2022. There has been no announcement on the future of the band. The other members of the White band performed at an Alan White tribute concert on 2 October 2022.
