= Bob Cesca =

American political commentator

- Born: July 12, 1971 (age 55); Washington, D.C., U.S.
- Education: Kutztown University of Pennsylvania
- Occupations: Director, producer, film producer, music director, music producer, writer, actor, blogger, political commentator
- Years active: 2001–present
- Notable credit: The Huffington Post
- Title: Bachelor of Political Science
- Website: bobcesca.com

Bob Cesca (born July 12, 1971) is an American director, producer, writer, actor, blogger and political commentator. He's the host of The Bob Cesca Show podcast on Stephanie Miller's Sexy Liberal Podcast Network. He is a regular contributor for Salon website.

== Background ==
Cesca grew up in Washington, D.C., and Northern Virginia. He graduated from Kutztown University of Pennsylvania with a bachelor's degree in political science. In his personal life, Cesca is an avid cyclist.

Cesca has written weekly columns for The Huffington Post since August 2005. He has also contributed to AOL's WalletPop blog (Now DailyFinance.com) and Manhattan magazine.

He began his career in media working as an intern for the Don and Mike Show in Washington, D.C. Later, he founded Camp Chaos, an alternative media production studio based near Philadelphia for which he animated and performed voices for the cartoon Napster Bad. As of 2006, he ran a new media production company called Snark Rocket.

Cesca directed music videos for Iron Maiden, Yes, Everclear, Mötley Crüe and Meat Loaf. He also designed the album and sleeve for the Yes album Magnification and the DVD release Symphonic Live.

In 2003, Cesca conceived and produced ILL-ustrated, a VH1 animated comedy series which premiered in October of that year. In 2006, Cesca edited and directed the animated series Kung Fu Jimmy Chow for Heavy.com.

About Cesca, Cenk Uygur of The Young Turks has said that "Bob's writing is totally fearless. That's what I love about it." In 2013, after whistle-blower Edward Snowden revealed NSA overreach, Cenk said, "There isn't anything Obama does that [Bob] wouldn't jump to the immediate, enormous and 110% defense of."

Cesca hosts The Bob Cesca Show, a thrice weekly podcast supported by crowdfunding site Patreon, where he discusses news, politics, music and other subjects.
