= Don't Kill the Whale =

Single by Yes

from the album Tormato
- B-side: "Abilene"
- Released: 25 August 1978
- Genre: Progressive rock
- Length: 3:55 (album version); 3:23 (single version)
- Label: Atlantic
- Songwriters: Jon Anderson; Chris Squire
- Producer: Yes

Yes singles chronology
"Going for the One" (1977)	"Don't Kill the Whale" (1978)	"Into the Lens" (1980)

"Don't Kill the Whale" is a song by the band Yes, released as a single from their 1978 album Tormato. It reached number 36 on the UK Singles Chart.

== Content ==
The song, as with most of the album's tracks, was short compared to the songs on Yes's 1973 album Tales from Topographic Oceans. Its style and lyrics make it "an unusually direct song for the group with its topical message", according to the band's website. However, that shift in style only helped make it a minor hit.

== Personnel ==
- Jon Anderson – lead vocals
- Steve Howe – guitar
- Rick Wakeman – polymoog, birotron
- Chris Squire – piano, bass guitar, backing vocals
- Alan White – drums

== Charts ==
Chart (1978)	Peak position
UK Singles (OCC)	36
