= Keystudio =

Compilation album by Yes
- Released: 21 May 2001
- Recorded: 1996–1997
- Studio: Yesworld Studios, San Luis Obispo, California and The Office, Van Nuys, California
- Genre: Progressive rock
- Length: 74:21
- Label: Castle Music; Sanctuary
- Producer: Yes; Billy Sherwood

Yes chronology
House of Yes: Live from House of Blues (2000)	Keystudio (2001)	Magnification (2001)

Keystudio is a compilation album by the English progressive rock band Yes, released in May 2001 by Castle Music in the United Kingdom and by Sanctuary Records in the United States. It is formed of the studio tracks previously released on live/studio albums Keys to Ascension (1996) and Keys to Ascension 2 (1997).

== Background ==
In 1994, in the latest of Yes's many personnel changes, long-term members Trevor Rabin and Tony Kaye left and, core members singer Jon Anderson, bass guitarist/singer Chris Squire, and drummer Alan White reunited with former members keyboardist Rick Wakeman and guitarist Steve Howe. There was critical and fan interest in this particular line-up of musicians due to their collective reputation from the progressive rock heyday of the 1970s. As a sign of "union" and forward movement, the band played and recorded a week of intimate reunion shows in March 1996 in San Luis Obispo, California. Also that March they recorded some new music in the studio. In November of that year, the double CD set Keys to Ascension was released, containing half of a San Luis Obispo show, and the first new material from this version of Yes since 1979, "Be the One" and "That, That Is", running ten minutes and twenty minutes, respectively.

In late 1996, the band re-assembled in San Luis Obispo to finalize more new music. The second part of the live shows were as yet unreleased. For the Keys followup, there was apparently the early intention to follow the same format of packaging live and studio music together, and the project was referred to as Keys to Ascension 2 even before the release of the first Keys. There was a level of internal questioning about this approach or the wisdom of again pairing live and studio tracks. Rick Wakeman, for one, felt this batch of new material so superior that it deserved its own independent identity. Wakeman had a thriving career in his own right and, in an unexpected move, exited Yes again in early 1997 for a variety of reasons. The reunion of the "classic era" line-up ended.

The double CD set Keys to Ascension 2 was released on 3 November 1997. By that time, Yes had adapted to the sudden loss of Wakeman by adding multi-instrumentalist Billy Sherwood and recording what would become their next studio album, Open Your Eyes (released three weeks after Keys 2). KTA2 is made up of one CD containing some of the rest of the San Luis Obispo recordings from 1996, and a second CD of new material spanning forty-plus minutes, including the twenty minute plus "Mind Drive".

The two studio tracks from Keys to Ascension and the five studio tracks from Keys 2 were brought together to form Keystudio.

== Production ==
=== Songs ===
Steve Howe has called the KTA2 material "quite substantial." In a 2000s interview, he commented, "The Keystudio material is challenging. It's not easy picking. These aren't tunes you just strum along to while sitting on your backside. They're very much works of craft and arrangement and were well-conceived. There's a lot of mood and dynamics in there." At a different time, he looked back and admired the "industrious" nature of the songwriting and creation that happened during KTA2.

In a pre-release review of two songs from KTA2, webmaster, blogger, and long-time Yes critic Henry Potts described opening song "Footprints" as a "very novel creature" that reminded him of earlier Yes. The a cappella beginning "my eyes see the coming revolution, my eyes see the glory of the world" were reminiscent of Dixie music, according to him.

According to bassist Chris Squire, "Be the One" was their first song to be recorded start to finish in one take since the group's second album, almost 30 years earlier.

"Mind Drive" began life in 1980 as a riff practiced by Chris Squire and Alan White along with Jimmy Page, former guitar icon of Led Zeppelin. Yes were in one of their many transitions. Led Zeppelin had recently lost drummer John Bonham, so the group was on hiatus and members of both bands were considering their next moves. The three jammed together and demo tracks were recorded (from which bootlegs have proliferated), but nothing ultimately came of the idea. The tentative band name had the project gone further was XYZ (ex-Yes & Zeppelin).

"Bring Me to the Power" is the first song credited solely to Anderson/Howe since 1977's opus "Awaken".

"That, That Is" was highly anticipated by fans due to its length and because of the lineup behind it. Wakeman mentioned during an interview that he felt Chris Squire's bass playing was better than ever on this track.

"Children of the Light" includes basic ideas going back to 1986. On KTA2 the title is "Children of Light". It is called "Children of the Light" on Keystudio. Minor differences between the two versions include a short keyboard introduction that was left off the KTA2 version, and slight differences in the verses.

== Release ==
Keystudio was released 21 May 2001. It achieved no chart status in any nation, and as a compilation of past material, garnered little attention in the way of reviews.

Right after his departure, Wakeman himself worried the studio tracks on Keys to Ascension 2 would get lost among the live music if they were marketed together. Commenting with hindsight in 2003, Howe felt this is exactly what happened with the studio music of both Keys to Ascension albums.

== Critical reception ==
Professional ratings
Review scores
Source	Rating
AllMusic	4/5 stars

Bret Adams of AllMusic gave the album four out of five stars, writing that it is a compilation that "makes perfect sense" and "it collects seven superb studio tracks" which he rates as "the strongest released by any version of Yes in years".

== Track listing ==
No.	Title	Writer(s)	Length
1.	"Foot Prints"	Anderson, Chris Squire, Steve Howe, Alan White	9:04
2.	"Be the One" a. "The One" (Anderson, Squire) b. "Humankind" (Anderson, Squire) c. "Skates" (Howe)	Anderson, Squire, Howe	9:49
3.	"Mind Drive"	Anderson, Squire, White, Howe, Rick Wakeman	18:34
4.	"Bring Me to the Power"	Anderson, Howe	7:20
5.	"Sign Language"	Howe, Wakeman	3:26
6.	"That, That Is" a. "Togetherness" (Howe) b. "Crossfire" (Anderson, Squire) c. "The Giving Things" (Anderson, Howe) d. "That Is" (Anderson, Squire) e. "All in All" (Anderson, White) f. "How Did Heaven Begin" (Anderson, Howe, White) g. "Agree to Agree" (Anderson, Squire)	Anderson, Squire, Howe, White	19:11
7.	"Children of the Light" a. "Lightning" (Wakeman) (previously unreleased) b. "Children of Light" (Anderson, Vangelis, Squire) c. "Lifeline" (Wakeman, Howe, Squire)	Anderson, Squire, Howe, Wakeman, Vangelis	6:38

== Personnel ==
- Jon Anderson – vocals, synth guitar (track 5), harp
- Steve Howe – 6 and 12 string electric and acoustic guitars, steel and pedal steel guitars, 5 string bass guitar (track 2), vocals
- Chris Squire – bass guitar, piccolo bass (track 2), vocals
- Rick Wakeman – keyboards
- Alan White – drums, vocals

Technical

- Yes – production
- Billy Sherwood – production (tracks 1, 3–5, 7), recording (tracks 1, 3–5, 7), mixing
- Tom Fletcher – co-production (tracks 2, 6), engineering (tracks 2, 6)
- Kevin Dickey – assistant engineering (tracks 2, 6)
- Zang Angelfire – assistant engineering (tracks 2, 6)
- Doug Gottlieb – design, photography
- Glenn Gottlieb – design, photography
- Roger Dean – Yes logo, additional graphics
