= Tormato =

1978 studio album by Yes

Studio album by Yes
- Released: 22 September 1978
- Recorded: February–June 1978
- Studios: Advision (Fitzrovia, London); RAK (Regent's Park, London)
- Genre: Progressive rock
- Length: 40:57
- Label: Atlantic
- Producer: Yes

Yes chronology
Going for the One (1977)	Tormato (1978)	Drama (1980)

Singles from Tormato
- 1. "Don't Kill the Whale" Released: 25 August 1978; 2. "Release, Release" Released: 7 November 1978 (US)

Tormato is the ninth studio album by the English progressive rock band Yes, released on 22 September 1978 by Atlantic Records. It marks the band's final studio release to feature lead vocalist Jon Anderson until 90125 (1983) and keyboardist Rick Wakeman until Union (1991). Following the tour for their previous album, Going for the One (1977), the band members reconvened in London to write and record a follow-up. The production was heavily impacted by a series of internal obstacles, including creative disputes regarding musical direction, the sudden departure of engineer and producer Eddy Offord early in the tracking process, and a decision by the band to self-produce the final mixes.

Musically, the sessions saw the introduction of new instrumentation that heavily shifted the band's sonic profile, including Wakeman's extensive use of the Birotron tape-replay keyboard and the Polymoog synthesizer. The album's final packaging and title–altered from the original working concept of Yes Tor–originated after a tomato was thrown at the initial sleeve design proposed by the art studio Hipgnosis, leading to conflicting historical accounts from the band and crew regarding who was responsible.

Upon its release, Tormato received a mixed response from music critics, who frequently targeted the album's complex arrangements and its compressed production quality. Despite the critical divide, the album was a major commercial success, peaking at number eight on the UK Albums Chart and number ten on the US Billboard 200. It became the band's fastest-selling release in the United States, achieving a platinum certification from the Recording Industry Association of America within two months of release. The single "Don't Kill the Whale" peaked at number 36 in the UK, and the supporting 1978–79 tour featured the band's first live performances executed in the round on a custom-built, central revolving stage. Tormato has since been remastered and reissued multiple times, notably in 2004 with previously unreleased session outtakes and in 2018 as a limited-edition picture disc.

== Background ==
In December 1977, the Yes line-up of Jon Anderson, Chris Squire, Steve Howe, Alan White, and Rick Wakeman concluded their concert tour of North America and Europe in support of Going for the One (1977). The record had marked a significant return to commercial success for the group, topping the UK charts for two weeks and spawning a UK top-ten single with "Wonderous Stories". Yes reconvened at Sound Associates in Bayswater, London, in February 1978 to compose and rehearse material for a follow-up studio release. Although the group sought to develop entirely fresh musical ideas rather than utilising older material, the foundational frameworks for the majority of the tracks were actually conceived during soundchecks and informal rehearsals while on the 1977 tour.

The band's original strategy was to release the new material as a double-volume project split into two parts; the first was scheduled for release in July 1978, while the second instalment was intended to arrive by Christmas. The group initially planned to complete the tracking sessions for the second volume on location in Barbados. However, this plan collapsed due to mounting time constraints and growing tax complications, forcing the band to consolidate the material into a single LP. The album's initial working title was Eleventh Illusion, reflecting the band's intention to centre their upcoming live stage sets around visual illusions.

== Recording ==
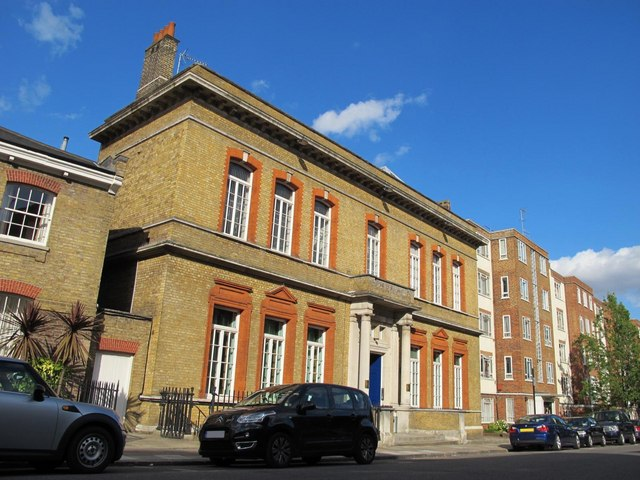
The exterior of RAK Studios in London, which served as one of the primary locations for the recording sessions

Tormato was recorded from February to June 1978, marking the first time the band divided tracking sessions between two different London facilities: Advision Studios in Fitzrovia and RAK Studios in Regent's Park. The musicians were initially divided over where the sessions should take place; Howe and Squire preferred to remain in London, suggesting a location that was "warm and comfortable and easy", whereas other members favoured a return to Switzerland, where they had recorded Going for the One.

The early studio sessions saw the brief return of producer and engineer Eddy Offord, who had not worked with the band in a studio environment since Relayer (1974), though his involvement ceased shortly after tracking commenced. Left without an outside producer, the band members elected to produce and mix the record themselves, retaining Geoff Young and Nigel Luby—both of whom had assisted during the Swiss sessions—as lead audio engineers. This insular management approach caused considerable interpersonal friction; Wakeman later recalled that "no one was afraid to say, 'Well, Jon, I think you should sing this part.' Or 'Steve, that's a bad guitar part.' Tempers got frayed." Howe concurred, noting that these studio arguments ultimately compromised the album's final sonic fidelity and tonal balance. By the conclusion of the tracking window, Yes had amassed enough material to fill an album and a half. Tormato was assembled with nine tracks (with "Future Times" and "Rejoice" paired as a single index), representing the highest number of discrete tracks on a Yes studio release since Fragile (1971).

The tracking sessions featured several instruments that had not appeared on prior Yes records. Wakeman revised his keyboard set-up to feature the Polymoog, a polyphonic synthesiser utilised primarily for "soloing and filling", alongside the Birotron, a unique tape-replay keyboard instrument he had co-funded during its manufacturing phases four years earlier. Wakeman purposefully restricted the overall number of keyboards in his rig to help the arrangements flow more cohesively. During a session break, the band played a practical joke on Wakeman by swapping out his custom Birotron cartridges with a pre-recorded tape of the American soft-rock duo Seals and Crofts. Howe recalled that when Wakeman pressed the keys, he demanded, "What the hell is this?" and became sufficiently frustrated to walk out of the studio. Wakeman later evaluated his performance on the record as being "60 per cent right and 40 per cent wrong." Howe complained that the frequencies of the Polymoog and Birotron clashed with his electric guitar tone, stating they often cancelled one another out, while Squire noted that Howe and Wakeman frequently overloaded individual bars with notes after Anderson tracked basic acoustic guitar chords and subsequently removed them from the mix.

In 2013, mastering engineer Brian Kehew evaluated the album's original sonics as "thin, flat and terrible." Kehew discovered that while Offord typically tracked using the Dolby A noise reduction system, the engineers who succeeded him failed to realise it had been applied, leaving the tapes uncompensated during mixing. Upon applying proper Dolby A decoding to the master tapes, Kehew noted that the core instrumentation immediately sounded excellent.

Musically, Howe identified "Madrigal", "Release, Release", and "On the Silent Wings of Freedom" as his preferred tracks. However, in his 2021 memoir All My Yesterdays, Howe admitted that several of the pieces proved unworkable in a live environment due to the negative studio memories they triggered, recalling: "'On the Silent Wings of Freedom' was actually often tried at tour rehearsals but it would just fall apart", and that "Future Times/Rejoice" was similarly unsuccessful".

== Songs ==
=== Side one ===
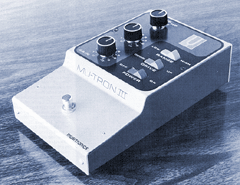
The Mu-Tron III envelope filter pedal. Bassist Chris Squire heavily processed his Rickenbacker bass through a Mu-Tron III pedal to achieve the distinctive, dynamically filtered tones heard on "Future Times" and "On the Silent Wings of Freedom".

The album opens with the two-part track "Future Times/Rejoice". Anderson wrote the music and lyrics to the piece, later noting that the text was unusually explicit in its meaning compared to his typically abstract, mystical writing style. Musically, the track features bassist Squire playing a harmonised Rickenbacker bass guitar processed through a Mu-Tron III envelope filter pedal, which gave his performance a distinctive, dynamically filtered sound texture.

"Don't Kill the Whale" originated during the 1976–1977 recording sessions for Going for the One in Switzerland, where bassist Squire conceived its foundational bassline and an acoustic guitar passage. Squire later presented the material to Anderson, who integrated the acoustic melody into the song's chorus. The song's environmental theme developed from multiple influences. Anderson wrote the lyrics using an existing poem he had drafted after watching a television documentary about tiger conservation, pivoting the subject matter to marine life to match Squire's music. The band's environmental focus was further galvanised by their friendship with music manager Terry Doran; although a busy studio schedule prevented Yes from accepting Doran's invitation to perform at a whale conservation benefit concert, the gesture directly inspired the track's completion. Musically, the track is notable for Wakeman's keyboard solo, for which he programmed his Polymoog patch to produce avant-garde, filtered textures meant to mimic the vocalizations of a whale.

"Madrigal" is a short acoustic piece that represents a distinct stylistic departure from the rest of the album. The song's concept originated from a suggestion by Anderson to Wakeman that they collaborate on a piece mirroring a traditional English madrigal, a form of historical evening song. To capture the intended Renaissance-inspired aesthetic, Wakeman plays a harpsichord made by Thomas Goff. The track is further distinguished by a subtle string arrangement by Andrew Pryce Jackman, adapted from an original structural idea by Wakeman. Jackman had previously collaborated with Squire on his solo album Fish Out of Water (1975). Retrospective reviews have noted that the classical, acoustic textures of "Madrigal" provided a brief sonic contrast to the dense, synthesizer-heavy arrangements that dominated the rest of the record.

Developed by Anderson and White, "Release, Release" is an up-tempo track that utilised automatic double tracking on White's drum parts to create a more expansive sound. The song was originally titled "The Anti-Campaign", reflecting contemporary political and social shifts, before the title was changed to mirror the repeated vocal refrain at its conclusion. During the studio sessions, Atlantic Records president Ahmet Ertegun visited the band and was so impressed by the energy of the track that he suggested the entire album should follow its stylistic direction. The instrumental break features a simulated live atmosphere, combining Howe's guitar solo and White's drum solo with the sound of a cheering crowd. Wakeman later noted that the crowd noise—sourced from an English football match recording—was added because the isolated instrumental tracks "sounded a bit dry" on their own. Despite Ertegun's enthusiasm, the track proved highly problematic in a concert setting. The demanding, high-register vocal parts caused strain to Anderson's voice, forcing the band to drop the song from their setlist early into the tour.

=== Side two ===
"Arriving UFO" was built around an initial melodic idea developed by Anderson. Inspired after viewing Steven Spielberg's science-fiction film Close Encounters of the Third Kind (1977) twice in theatres, he sought to compose a track centred on a similar extra-terrestrial theme. While Anderson provided the song's conceptual framework, Wakeman was responsible for composing and arranging its complex instrumental bridge.

"Circus of Heaven" narrates the arrival of a mythological, travelling carnival in a Midwestern town, featuring lyrical imagery of unicorns, centaurs, elves, and fairies. The song's creative direction stemmed from Anderson's desire to compose material tailored for children. The concept was loosely inspired by a Ray Bradbury story Anderson had read a decade prior, which he later recounted to his young son, Damion; the child provides a spoken-word commentary at the track's conclusion. Musically, the piece features an unusual arrangement for the band. Squire considered the composition particularly notable for its rhythm section, which required him to perform a reggae-influenced bassline against Alan White's driving beat.

"Onward" is a ballad credited solely to Squire, who originally developed the piece as a vocal-and-piano demo before presenting it to the rest of the band. The track features an orchestral arrangement by Jackman, continuing a creative partnership that dated back to their time together in The Syn in the late 1960s. Squire highly regarded the composition in retrospect, citing it as one of the finest songs of his career. Although omitted from the band's concert sets during the late 1970s, "Onward" was eventually performed live in 1996 for the group's Keys to Ascension concert series. For these performances, the song was expanded to include a new acoustic guitar prelude performed by Howe, titled "Unity".

The nearly eight-minute "On the Silent Wings of Freedom" is a collaborative composition by Anderson and Squire, and stands as the longest track on the album. Musically, the song is structurally anchored by its heavy instrumental introduction. Squire's prominent bass guitar performance is heavily processed through the Mu-Tron III pedal, providing a distinctive, dynamically altered tone that filters his intricate opening lines. Though the tracking sessions for the piece featured fast tempos from White and sweeping synthesizer arrangements from Wakeman, contemporary music reviews noted it as one of the few extended, traditional progressive rock arrangements on the record. The track was performed on the album's supporting tour, but was subsequently retired from concert setlists for 43 years until the band revived it in 2022.

=== Additional material ===
Certain original British cassette and 8-track cartridge releases of Tormato, which featured significantly altered track sequencing compared to the standard LP format, included an unlisted bonus track titled "Richard". Written by Anderson, the song was positioned immediately following "Release, Release". Because the track was summarily removed from subsequent UK pressings and omitted from all international tape formats, its initial inclusion is considered to be a manufacturing oversight rather than an intentional production choice. "Richard" remained commercially unavailable for over two decades until its official release on the band's career-spanning box set, In a Word: Yes (1969–) (2002). However, the track was excluded from the album's expanded and remastered reissue in 2003, which instead favoured other studio outtakes.

== Artwork and title ==
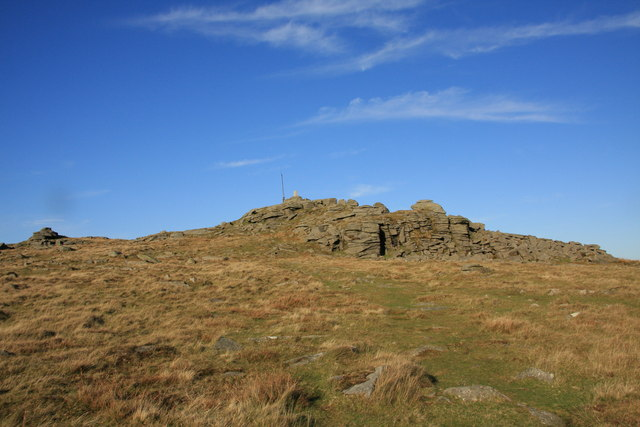
The rocky peak of Yes Tor on Dartmoor, Devon. Guitarist Steve Howe originally suggested naming the album after the location before a thrown tomato disrupted the packaging design and nixed the concept.

As with their previous studio album Going for the One, the cover for Tormato was designed by the British graphic art studio Hipgnosis, while retaining the band's signature "bubble" logo created by Roger Dean. Howe proposed the album's original working title, Yes Tor, which directly referenced Yes Tor, the second-highest hill on Dartmoor in Devon, England. The surrealist photographic concept originally designed by Hipgnosis for the project had previously been offered to the new wave band XTC for their upcoming studio album, Go 2 (1978).

During the production phase, a real tomato was physically thrown at the initial design mockup, completely altering the album's visual layout and ultimate title. Accounts regarding who was responsible for the incident vary drastically among the album's personnel. Wakeman claimed he threw the tomato out of sheer frustration over the high costs of the design work relative to its poor visual appeal. According to Wakeman, band manager Brian Lane then noticed the smashed tomato sliding down the artwork, laid the canvas flat, and suggested they simply photograph the resulting mess and adjust the title to Tormato accordingly.

Conversely, Howe maintained that a Hipgnosis staff member threw the tomato, which he personally felt was an insult to the band. White corroborated the design house's involvement, stating that Hipgnosis co-founder Aubrey Powell took the prototype image home after realising the composition—which featured a silhouette of a man holding divining sticks against a landscape—was not succeeding artistically, and threw the fruit at it himself. Lane later denied Wakeman's account entirely, asserting that the band members collectively threw the tomatoes in unified disapproval of the location photos taken at Dartmoor. Squire ultimately compared the absurdity of the entire visual development process to the slapstick antics of the Marx Brothers.

The final inner sleeve features a group photograph taken on location at Regent's Park in London, depicting each member looking in a completely different direction while wearing identical black bomber jackets and sunglasses. While each member had a custom jacket explicitly embroidered with their first name on the chest, Squire forgot his personal jacket for the photo shoot. He was forced to wear a spare jacket belonging to tour manager Jim Halley that was visibly labelled "Jim", resulting in graphic artist Colin Elgie manually drawing the name "Chris" over the print before the sleeve went to press.

== Release ==
Tormato was released on 22 September 1978. To support the launch in the United States, the album was broadcast in its entirety at midnight on 29 September by the Philadelphia radio station WIOQ-FM. The record was a major commercial success, peaking at number eight on the UK Albums Chart and number ten on the US Billboard 200. Prior to the album's arrival, "Don't Kill the Whale" was issued as the lead single on 25 August 1978, subsequently peaking at number 36 in the United Kingdom. Yes donated a portion of the royalties from each single sold to Greenpeace to support the organisation's campaigns against commercial whaling.

The album achieved commercial milestones rapidly in both territories. It was certified Gold by the British Phonographic Industry (BPI) during its initial retail run. In the United States, Tormato became the band's fastest-selling release to date, achieving a Platinum certification from the Recording Industry Association of America (RIAA) on 8 November 1978 for sales exceeding one million units. Following a concert appearance at The Forum in Los Angeles, a formal industry reception was hosted for the band to commemorate the sales milestone alongside their tenth anniversary as a group.

== Critical reception ==
Professional ratings
Review scores
Source	Rating
AllMusic	2/5 stars
Pitchfork	3.8/10
Rolling Stone	(unfavourable)
The Rolling Stone Album Guide	1.5/5 stars

Upon its release, Tormato received a polarised response from contemporary music critics. Assessing the record for Record World, the reviewer summarised that the album brought "the Yes stamp of intriguing music" to a new decade and recognised "Don't Kill the Whale" as a potential hit. Audio magazine gave the album's technical tracking an "A" sound rating and an "A−" performance score. Reviewers Michael Tearson and Jon Tiven observed that the record "shows the most song consciousness of any Yes has done in a long while", praising its focus on compact, "song-sized ideas, instead of murals". The publication commended the group for implementing more economical arrangements, noting "exemplary" production work alongside "excellent" dynamic fidelity. While "Don't Kill the Whale" was lauded for delivering an urgent message without sounding "heavy-headed", the tracks "Future Times/Rejoice" and "Release, Release" were singled out for pairing progressive technical thrusts with rigid rock beats. Conversely, the whimsical instrumentation of "Circus of Heaven" led the writers to compare the track to the surreal atmosphere of the fantasy film 7 Faces of Dr. Lao (1964). Reviewers at Cash Box agreed with this assessment, asserting that the record was a "welcome break away from Yes' extended jamming and massive concept works of the mid '70s", highlighting the "intricate, sophisticated yet rocking textures" driven by Howe and Wakeman's collaborative riffs.

More hostile assessments targeted the band's ideological direction. A contemporary review published in Record Mirror scathingly dismissed the material as "the Sunday school of rock", characterising the arrangements as "maximum pomposity, maximum pretension, maximum elaboration, all covering up minimum inspiration." Steve Pond, writing for the Los Angeles Times, offered a mixed critique, noting a distinct deficit of memorable melodies compared to the experimental scale of Tales from Topographic Oceans (1973), which initially made the new material feel "distant and unappetizing". Nevertheless, Pond conceded that the record "eventually emerges as one of Yes' strongest and most important albums" due to its streamlined balance of classic progressive rock elements. He highlighted the "raw energy and forcefulness" anchoring "Future Times/Rejoice" as a prime example of their refined musical evolution, while specifically praising White and Squire as a robust rhythm section. However, Pond remained deeply critical of "Arriving UFO" and "Circus of Heaven", which he argued were completely overwhelmed by excessive "studio trickery and sound effects".

Retrospective assessments have remained similarly divided, primarily focusing on technical limitations. Yes biographer Chris Welch later evaluated that the weakest aspect of the sessions was the final mixing quality, describing it as a characteristically compressed and dull sonic mix. Wakeman later echoed these criticisms, openly labelling Tormato "a tragedy" due to its uninspired final cover artwork and cluttered production space, despite maintaining that the record housed genuinely strong compositions.

== Reissues ==
- 1988 – Atlantic – CD
- 1994 – Atlantic – CD (Remastered)
- 2004 – Rhino – CD (Remastered with bonus tracks)
- 2018 – Atlantic – LP (40th anniversary picture disc edition issued for Record Store Day, limited to 5,400 copies).

== Tour ==
Yes supported the album with a 101-date tour of North America and the United Kingdom, spanning from 28 August 1978 to 30 June 1979. The British leg was exceptionally brief, comprising just six consecutive nights at London's Wembley Arena in October 1978. The tour was notable for introducing a custom-built, £50,000 circular stage placed entirely in the centre of each arena, allowing for 360-degree vision. Weighing six tons and featuring a panoramic sound and lighting system suspended above it, the platform slowly rotated at one mile per hour, completing four full revolutions per hour. To prevent motion sickness, Anderson stood on a separate, centrally raised platform that systematically rotated in the opposite direction of the main stage mechanism. The underlying structural framing housed the tour sound crew, operating an area equipped with a built-in refrigerated refreshment cabinet. During an early performance on the itinerary, the mechanical driving motor completely failed, forcing the group's road crew to manually spin the massive stage framework by hand while the band performed. The innovative concept was originally devised by the band's longtime lighting technician Michael Tait, who collaborated directly with engineers from their sound reinforcement provider, Clair Brothers, to implement the unique array.

The band's nightly stage entrance was synchronised to a tape playback of The Young Person's Guide to the Orchestra by Benjamin Britten, combined with an orchestral excerpt from the opening of the science-fiction film Close Encounters of the Third Kind. Commemorating their tenth anniversary as a musical collective, the performance setlist featured a career-spanning 30-minute medley containing rearranged excerpts from tracks dating back to their self-titled 1969 debut album.

The initial 1978 leg was highlighted by a four-night residency at Madison Square Garden in New York City, which completely sold out within three days. The engagement earned the band a Madison Square Garden Gold Ticket Award, acknowledging a box office intake that exceeded 100,000 ticket sales and grossed over $1 million ($4.8 million in 2026 value). Yes subsequently returned to the venue to perform three additional dates in June 1979. Various recordings from the tour were later compiled for the band's live double album, Yesshows (1980).

== Track listing ==
Side one
No.	Title	Music	Length
1.	"Future Times" / "Rejoice"	Anderson, Howe, Squire, Wakeman, White/Anderson	6:46
2.	"Don't Kill the Whale"	Anderson, Squire	3:55
3.	"Madrigal"	Anderson, Wakeman	2:21
4.	"Release, Release"	Anderson, Squire, White	5:40
Total length:			18:42

Side two
No.	Title	Music	Length
1.	"Arriving UFO"	Anderson, Howe, Wakeman	6:02
2.	"Circus of Heaven"	Anderson	4:28
3.	"Onward"	Squire	4:00
4.	"On the Silent Wings of Freedom"	Anderson, Squire	7:45
Total length:			22:15

2004 reissue bonus tracks
No.	Title	Music	Length
9.	"Abilene (Note: "Abilene" was the B-side of "Don't Kill the Whale".)"	Howe	4:02
10.	"Money (Note: "Money" was released on the box set Yesyears (1991).)"	Squire, Anderson, White, Wakeman	3:15
11.	"Picasso"	Anderson	2:12
12.	"Some Are Born (Note: "Some Are Born" was re-worked by Anderson for his second solo album, Song of Seven (1980).)"	Anderson	5:42
13.	"You Can Be Saved"	Squire	4:20
14.	"High (Note: "High" would be re-worked by Howe as "Sketches in the Sun", an instrumental track released on GTR (1986).)"	Howe	4:30
15.	"Days (Note: "Days" was re-worked by Anderson for his second solo album, Song of Seven.)"	Anderson	1:00
16.	"Countryside (Note: "Countryside" was re-worked by Howe as "Corkscrew" his solo album Turbulence (1991).)"	Anderson, Howe, Squire, White	3:11
17.	"Everybody's Song (Note: "Everybody's Song" is an early version of what became "Does It Really Happen?" on Drama (1980).)"	Anderson, Howe, Squire, White	6:48
18.	"Onward (Orchestral Version)"	Squire	3:06
Total length:			1:19:03 (79:03)

== Personnel ==
Credits adapted from the album's 1978 liner notes.

Yes

- Jon Anderson – vocals, 10-string Alvarez guitar (1, 5, 8)
- Steve Howe – Gibson Les Paul Custom guitar (1, 2, 5–7), Martin 000–45 (1), Fender Broadcaster (4), Gibson ES-175 (8), Gibson acoustic guitar (6), mandolin (6), Spanish guitar (3), vocals
- Chris Squire – harmonised Rickenbacker bass (1, 2, 5–8), Gibson Thunderbird bass (4), bass pedals (1, 3, 5), piano (2), vocals
- Rick Wakeman – Birotron (1, 2, 4–6, 8), Hammond organ (1, 4), Polymoog synthesizer (all but 3), piano (5), harpsichord (3), RMI Electra Piano (8)
- Alan White – drums (1, 2, 4–6, 8), military snare drum (1), glockenspiel (1), crotales (1, 3, 6, 7), cymbals (3), bell tree (3), drum synthesizer (5), gongs (5), vibraphone (7), percussion and vocals (4)

Technical personnel

- Geoff Young – engineer
- Nigel Luby – engineer
- Peter Woolliscroft – additional engineering
- Pete Schwier – additional engineering
- Sean Davis – disk cutting at Strawberry Studios, London
- Brian Lane – executive producer
- Hipgnosis – sleeve design, photography
- Rob Brimson – photography (Yes Tor and tomato)
- Colin Elgie – graphics
- Roger Dean – Yes logo design

== Charts ==
Chart (1978)	Peak position
Australian Albums (Kent Music Report)	22
Canada Top Albums/CDs (RPM)	30
Dutch Albums (Album Top 100)	17
Finnish Albums (The Official Finnish Charts)	21
French Albums (SNEP)	9
German Albums (Offizielle Top 100)	36
Japanese Albums (Oricon)	41
New Zealand Albums (RMNZ)	34
Norwegian Albums (VG-lista)	9
Swedish Albums (Sverigetopplistan)	18
UK Albums (Official Charts)	8
US Billboard 200	10

== Certifications ==
Region	Certification	Certified units/sales
Canada (Music Canada)	Gold	50,000^{^}
United Kingdom (BPI)	Gold	100,000^{^}
United States (RIAA)	Platinum	1,000,000^{^}
^{^} Shipments figures based on certification alone.
