= Ben Craven =

Australian musician and producer

- Origin: Brisbane, Australia
- Genres: Progressive rock, Cinematic Rock
- Instruments: Guitar, Bass, Keyboards, Vocals, Drums
- Years active: 2005–present
- Labels: Desert Comb Music
- Website: bencraven.com

Ben Craven is an Australian musician and producer who became known for his 2011 progressive rock album, Great & Terrible Potions, which featured artwork by cover designer Roger Dean.

== Career ==
=== Under Deconstruction ===
In 2007, Craven recorded the EP Under Deconstruction as a free download, protesting against the use of DRM in the music industry. Craven later observed that DRM was only a distraction from the problem of monetising legal music file downloads.

=== Ben Craven & The Section ===
In 2012, Craven assembled three-piece band Ben Craven & The Section specifically for live performances of his album Great & Terrible Potions. The band was interviewed and performed for a live interactive video streaming event in May 2013, in what was billed as a world-first for progressive rock.

=== Last Chance To Hear ===
Last Chance To Hear was released in 2016, a concept album "loosely inspired by the end of the music industry as we knew it", featuring guest contributions from Billy Sherwood and William Shatner. In October 2016, Craven was awarded the Australian Independent Music Award (AIMA) for Best Instrumental, for the track Critical Mass Part 2.

=== Ambient Den ===
Craven was a founding member of the Australian progressive rock band Ambient Den, alongside Tim Bennetts and Dean Povey. He performed guitar, bass and programming on the band’s self-titled debut album released in 2025, and served as the record’s producer.

== Discography ==
=== Solo ===
- Two False Idols (2005)
- Under Deconstruction (EP) (2007)
- Great & Terrible Potions (2011)
- Last Chance to Hear (CD+DVD) (2016)
- First Chance to Hear (Blu-Ray) (2017)
- Monsters From The Id (CD+DVD) (2022)

=== With Ambient Den ===
- Ambient Den (2025)

=== Appears on ===
- All in a Dream by The Franky Valentyn Project (2015, vocals on Gothic Horror)
- Alter Ego by Joost Maglev (2019, guitar on Corpus Christi, Burning Girl)
- Planetary Overload Part 2: Hope by United Progressive Fraternity (2022, composer and guitar on The Answer)
