= Keys to Ascension 2 =

Live album / Studio album by Yes
- Released: 3 November 1997
- Recorded: 4–6 March 1996 at the Fremont Theater, San Luis Obispo, California (Live tracks); November 1996 at Yesworld Studio, San Luis Obispo (Studio tracks)
- Genre: Progressive rock
- Length: 101:42
- Label: Essential
- Producer: Yes; Billy Sherwood

Yes chronology
Something's Coming: The BBC Recordings 1969–1970 (1997)	Keys to Ascension 2 (1997)	Open Your Eyes (1997)

Keys to Ascension 2 is the fifth live and sixteenth studio album by the English progressive rock band Yes. It was released as a double album in November 1997 by Essential Records as the successor to the previous live/studio album Keys to Ascension. After guitarist Steve Howe and keyboardist Rick Wakeman returned to the band in 1995, the group relocated to San Luis Obispo, California and started to write new material. The reunion of the Tales from Topographic Oceans-era line-up was promoted with three concerts at the city's Fremont Theater in March 1996, the five's first live performance together since 1979. Keys to Ascension 2 features the remaining half of the live set from the 1996 shows and five new studio tracks including two which marked a return to the group writing long-form pieces. It would ultimately serve as Wakeman's final studio album with the band.

Keys to Ascension 2 received mixed reviews from music critics. It reached No. 62 on the UK Albums Chart and No. 169 on the Billboard 200 in the United States. A promotional North American tour was set to start in June 1997, but was cancelled after Wakeman departed from the band due to scheduling conflicts. The studio material from the Keys to Ascension albums was compiled on Keystudio (2001), and both albums were reissued in their entirety in 1998 and 2010, the latter with the concert video as a bonus disc.

== Background ==
In mid-1995, guitarist Steve Howe and keyboardist Rick Wakeman returned to the group, which had also comprised lead vocalist Jon Anderson, bassist Chris Squire, and drummer Alan White. The five assembled in San Luis Obispo, California to rehearse and record new studio material which included concerts at the city's Fremont Theater from 4–6 March 1996, the first live performance of this particular line-up since 1979. The first half of their live set from the 1996 shows, plus two new studio tracks, were released as Keys to Ascension in October 1996 by Essential Records.

By the time Keys to Ascension was released, the label had expressed a wish for the group to put out roughly 45 minutes of new studio material with the remaining unreleased live tracks from the 1996 concerts as a second installment of the Keys to Ascension series. The band agreed, and had a deadline to hand over the finished album by the end of November 1996 in exchange for a sum of money from the label that Christmas. Wakeman was "heavily against" the album's title due to his excitement over the quality of the new songs that Yes had recorded which he thought deserved to be released as a separate album.

== Production ==
=== Live tracks ===
The live tracks were recorded at the Fremont Theater in San Luis Obispo, California

Disc one contains the remaining unreleased live tracks from the three shows at the Fremont Theatre in March 1996. This includes material from Time and a Word (1970), The Yes Album (1971), Close to the Edge (1972), and Going for the One (1977).

=== Studio tracks ===
Disc two contains five studio tracks that were recorded in the course of a year from the fall of 1995. After promoting Keys to Ascension the group finalised the arrangements mainly from ideas that Anderson, Squire, and White had already put down and recorded the songs in November 1996. The band leased a building in San Luis Obispo that was once a bank and set up a recording studio inside that was later dubbed Yesworld Studio on the album's sleeve notes. Working with the band was Tom Fletcher, who was only available to oversee production of the live tracks as he had commitments with Steve Lukather. This prompted Squire to suggest Billy Sherwood, who had played additional guitars during Yes's 1994 tour, to complete production on the studio material and additional recording, engineering, and mixing. This was the first time Wakeman had worked with Sherwood, and the keyboardist praised Sherwood's attitude and contributions to the album. Wakeman was particularly pleased with the studio tracks on Keys to Ascension 2, rating them "light years" ahead of the studio material on its predecessor. He reasoned this down to the sense of maturity in the songs and the greater amount of input from the band in terms of what they and other members played, something that had not been done for a long time.

"Mind Drive" was originally a song that was rehearsed by the proposed supergroup XYZ featuring Squire, White, and guitarist Jimmy Page. "Children of the Light" was originally written by Jon and Vangelis in 1986 as "Distant Thunder". A demo version was recorded by Anderson Bruford Wakeman Howe which was included as a hidden track on the 2011 reissue of Anderson Bruford Wakeman Howe (1989). The lyrics to the song were printed on the band's 1991 tour book. The original version of "Children of the Light" included a keyboard introduction written by Wakeman entitled "Lightning", but it was removed prior to the album's release. In 1998, Howe said that the introduction was taken off following the group's overall dissatisfaction with it, an opinion that the record company also shared. The section was restored on the 2001 compilation album Keystudio, which combined the studio tracks from both Keys to Ascension albums. The version of "Children of the Light" on the compilation, however, has a verse removed.

=== Artwork ===
As with its predecessor, Keys to Ascension 2 features cover art by Roger Dean on an outer sleeve that fits around the package. On the sleeve, the image's predominant colour is magenta, but the booklet features the painting in its original blue colouration.

== Release ==
Professional ratings
Review scores
Source	Rating
AllMusic	3/5 stars
Vox	2/5 stars
The Rolling Stone Album Guide	1.5/5 stars

The studio tracks from this album and Keys to Ascension were rereleased on Keystudio. The whole album was reissued in 2010 along with its earlier companion album Keys to Ascension and the concert video of the same name as part of the Keys to Ascension box set.

== Track listing ==
All lyrics are written by Jon Anderson.

Disc one (Live tracks)
No.	Title	Writers	Length
1.	"I've Seen All Good People" a. "Your Move" (Anderson) b. "All Good People" (Chris Squire)	Anderson, Squire	7:16
2.	"Going for the One"	Anderson	4:58
3.	"Time and a Word"	Anderson, David Foster	6:23
4.	"Close to the Edge"; I. "The Solid Time of Change"; II. "Total Mass Retain"; III. "I Get Up I Get Down"; IV. "Seasons of Man"	Anderson, Steve Howe	19:40
5.	"Turn of the Century"	Anderson, Howe, Alan White	7:55
6.	"And You and I"; I. "Cord of Life" (Anderson, Bruford, Howe, Squire); II. "Eclipse" (Anderson, Bruford, Squire); III. "The Preacher the Teacher" (Anderson, Bruford, Howe, Squire); IV. "Apocalypse" (Anderson, Bruford, Howe, Squire)	Anderson, Bill Bruford, Howe, Squire	10:48

Disc two (Studio tracks)
No.	Title	Writers	Length
1.	"Mind Drive"	Anderson, Squire, White, Howe, Rick Wakeman	18:37
2.	"Foot Prints"	Anderson, Squire, Howe, White	9:09
3.	"Bring Me to the Power"	Anderson, Howe	7:25
4.	"Children of Light" a. "Children of Light" (Anderson, Squire, Vangelis) b. "Lifeline" (Howe, Wakeman)	Anderson, Squire, Vangelis, Howe, Wakeman	6:02
5.	"Sign Language"	Howe, Wakeman	3:32
Total length:			44:45

Note: "Children of Light" is called "Children of the Light" on some pressings of Keys to Ascension as well as Keystudio.

== Personnel ==
Credits are adapted from the album's 1997 liner notes.

Yes

- Jon Anderson – vocals, guitar, harp
- Steve Howe – 6- and 12-string electric and acoustic guitars, steel and pedal steel, 5-string bass, vocals
- Chris Squire – bass guitar, vocals
- Rick Wakeman – keyboards
- Alan White – drums, vocals

Production

- Yes – production
- Billy Sherwood – production, recording, mixing
- Tom Fletcher – live tracks recording
- Kevin Dickey – Sonic Solutions digital editing
- Joe Gastwirt – mastering at Ocean View Digital Mastering
- Roger Dean – paintings, logos, lettering
- Martyn Dean – packaging design
- Gottlieb Bros./Yes Magazine – booklet design, photography

== Charts ==
Chart (1997)	Peak position
Scottish Albums (OCC)	89
UK Albums (OCC)	62
US Billboard 200	169
