= VH1 ILL-ustrated =

- Genre: Adult animation Satire; Sketch comedy
- Created by: Bob Cesca
- Developed by: Camp Chaos Productions
- Starring: Various
- Voices of: Various
- Country of origin: United States
- Original languages: English; Spanish (SAP)
- No. of seasons: 1
- No. of episodes: 13

Production
- Running time: 30 minutes

Original release
- Network: VH1; VTV; MTV2 (2006); SBS (2007)
- Release: October 17, 2003 – June 25, 2004

VH1 ILL-ustrated is an adult animated sketch comedy television series that aired on VH1. It was conceived by animation producer Bob Cesca and parodied pop culture and politics. This is the only half-hour TV series that Cesca's Camp Chaos Productions created and produced. Recurring characters include satirical caricatures of Axl Rose (who works at a McDonald's restaurant, and screams people's orders), Michael Jackson (who leaves Earth in search of a place that will accept him and his monkey, Bubbles), among others.

The animated series were later aired on MTV2 (2006) and SBS (2007).

== Episodes ==
=== Season 1 (2003) ===
No. Overall	No. In Season	Title	Original Air Date
1	1	Episode #1.1	October 17, 2003
2	2	Episode #1.2	October 17, 2003
3	3	Episode #1.3	October 17, 2003

=== Season 2 (2004) ===
No. Overall	No. In Season	Title	Original Air Date
4	1	Episode #2.1	May 17, 2004
5	2	Episode #2.2	May 18, 2004
6	3	Episode #2.3	May 19, 2004
7	4	Episode #2.4	May 20, 2004
8	5	Episode #2.5	May 21, 2004
9	6	Episode #2.6	May 28, 2004
10	7	Episode #2.7	June 4, 2004
11	8	Episode #2.8	June 11, 2004
12	9	Episode #2.9	June 18, 2004
13	10	Episode #2.10	June 25, 2004

== Segments ==
The majority of sketches are a satirical view of world issues. An example includes SpongeBong HempPants, a parody of SpongeBob SquarePants, in which "SpongeBong" is a green-colored marijuana addict, while "Hashbrick" is a brick of hash. Another recurring parody is of the Hanna-Barbera cartoon Yogi Bear featuring Al Gore as the ranger, and George W. Bush and Dick Cheney as the meddling bears who cause problems for Jellystone National Park; such mischief includes drilling for oil in the middle of a lake, when explicitly told not to by Ranger Gore.

Other segments are general satires of popular culture, such as Popeye in Anime, a parody of Popeye the Sailor Man as if it was drawn in an anime style, and a segment in which the rock band Guns N' Roses is working in a McDonald's and take orders to the tune of their songs "Welcome to the Jungle", "Patience" and "Paradise City".

They also frequently poked-fun at their home station's (VH1) new series of shows having nothing to do with music, such as a segment called VH1's I Love 5 Seconds Ago, in which famous actors, actresses and singers would tell the best thing about five seconds ago. An example of this would be "I was wearing a total hipster shirt five seconds ago, and I still wear it now. Cool never goes out of style."
