= Symphonic Live =

Video / live album by Yes
- Released: 18 June 2002 (DVD, 1 CD); 2003 (1 CD); 2009 (2 CD); 2011 (Blu-ray)
- Recorded: 22 November 2001
- Venue: Heineken Music Hall, Amsterdam, Netherlands
- Genre: Progressive rock, symphonic rock
- Length: 194:00 (DVD): 76:43 (single CD)
- Label: Eagle Vision; Eagle Records
- Director: Aubrey Powell
- Producer: Perry Joseph

Yes chronology
Magnification (2001)	Symphonic Live (2002)	Yesspeak (2004)

Yes chronology
Symphonic Live (2002)	In a Word: Yes (1969–) (2002)

Symphonic Live is a video and live album by the English progressive rock band Yes, released on DVD and a single CD on 18 June 2002 by Eagle Vision and subsequently on two CDs and on Blu-ray by Eagle Records. The album documents the group's performance at the Heineken Music Hall in Amsterdam on 22 November 2001 during their Yessymphonic Tour, supporting their nineteenth studio album Magnification, which also featured an orchestra. The tour featured Yes performing on stage with an orchestra; Symphonic Live features the European Festival Orchestra conducted by Wilheilm Keitel.

Keyboardist Rick Wakeman was invited by the band to perform at this concert, but this did not happen because of scheduling conflicts. In his place was Tom Brislin.

== Reception ==
Professional ratings
Review scores
Source	Rating
AllMusic	3.5/5 stars
PopMatters	6/10

Alan Ranta of PopMatters gave Symphonic Live a mixed review, saying that "by the time they recorded this concert in 2001, their age had begun to show" and that "Symphonic Live is a solid set, but it won’t be converting a new generation of fans". In a review for AllMusic, Bret Adams gave the album 3.5 stars out of five and wrote that it "takes some time to settle into a groove, but it eventually does" and that "the sweeping musical twists and turns are simply stunning, and they are skillfully executed by both Yes and the orchestra".

Since the band was playing very well together in the filmed shows, guitarist Steve Howe believes that Symphonic Live is "possibly the best Yes DVD available".

== Track listing ==
=== DVD ===
DVD 1 – Main Program
No.	Title	Writer(s)	Length
1.	"Overture"		2:30
2.	"Close to the Edge": I. "The Solid Time of Change"; II. "Total Mass Retain"; III. "I Get Up, I Get Down"; IV. "Seasons of Man"	Jon Anderson, Chris Squire, Bill Bruford, Steve Howe, Rick Wakeman	20:30
3.	"Long Distance Runaround"	Anderson, Squire, Bruford, Howe, Wakeman	5:29
4.	"Don't Go"	Anderson, Howe, Squire, Alan White	4:29
5.	"In the Presence Of": I. "Deeper"; II. "Death of Ego"; III. "True Beginner"; IV. "Turn Around and Remember"	Anderson, Squire, Howe, White	11:04
6.	"The Gates of Delirium"	Anderson, Howe, Squire, White, Patrick Moraz	23:30
7.	"Steve Howe Guitar Solo": Lute Concerto in D, 2nd Movement; "Mood for a Day"	Vivaldi (arr. Howe), Howe	6:26
8.	"Starship Trooper": a. "Life Seeker"; b. "Disillusion"; c. "Würm"	Anderson, Howe, Squire	12:18
9.	"Magnification"	Anderson, Howe, Squire, White	7:23
10.	"And You and I": I. "Cord of Life"; II. "Eclipse"; III. "The Preacher, The Teacher"; IV. "Apocalypse"	Anderson, Bruford, Howe, Squire, Wakeman	11:16
11.	"Ritual (Nous Sommes du Soleil)"	Anderson, Howe, Squire, White, Wakeman	28:21
12.	"I've Seen All Good People": a. "Your Move"; b. "All Good People"	Anderson, Squire	7:21
13.	"Owner of a Lonely Heart"	Trevor Rabin, Trevor Horn, Squire, Anderson	5:49
14.	"Roundabout"	Anderson, Squire, Bruford, Howe, Wakeman	6:28

DVD 2 – Bonus Material
No.	Title	Length
1.	"Don't Go Music Video"	4:28
2.	"Dreamtime Documentary"	31:51

=== CD (1 disc) ===
Track listing
No.	Title	Writer(s)	Length
1.	"Overture"	Groupe	2:53
2.	"Close to the Edge": I. "The Solid Time of Change"; II. "Total Mass Retain"; III. "I Get Up, I Get Down"; IV. "Seasons of Man"	Anderson, Howe	20:04
3.	"Orchestral Intro"	Groupe	1:19
4.	"Long Distance Runaround"	Anderson	4:30
5.	"Don't Go"	Anderson, Howe, Squire, White	4:24
6.	"Starship Trooper": a. "Life Seeker"; b. "Disillusion"; c. "Würm"	Anderson, Howe, Squire	12:21
7.	"And You and I": I. "Cord of Life"; II. "Eclipse"; III. "The Preacher, The Teacher"; IV. "Apocalypse"	Anderson, themes by Bruford, Howe, Squire	11:23
8.	"I've Seen All Good People": a. "Your Move"; b. "All Good People"	Anderson, Squire	7:24
9.	"Owner of a Lonely Heart"	Rabin, Horn, Squire, Anderson	6:02
10.	"Roundabout"	Anderson, Howe	6:23

=== CD (2 disc) ===
==== Disc one ====
1. "Overture"
2. "Close To The Edge"
  I. "The Solid Time of Change"
  II. "Total Mass Retain"
  III. "I Get Up, I Get Down"
  IV. "Seasons of Man"
3. "Long Distance Runaround"
4. "Don't Go"
5. "In The Presence Of"
  I. "Deeper"
  II. "Death of Ego"
  III. "True Beginner"
  IV. "Turn Around and Remember"
6. "The Gates of Delirium"
7. "Steve Howe Guitar Solo"
  I. Lute Concerto in D, 2nd Movement
  II. "Mood for a Day"

==== Disc two ====
1. "Starship Trooper"
  I. "Life Seeker"
  II. "Disillusion"
  III. "Würm"
2. "Magnification"
3. "And You and I"
  I. "Cord of Life"
  II. "Eclipse" (Anderson, Bruford, Squire)
  III. "The Preacher, The Teacher"
  IV. "Apocalypse"
4. "Ritual (Nous Sommes du Soleil)"
5. "I've Seen All Good People"
  I. "Your Move"
  II. "All Good People"
6. "Owner of a Lonely Heart"
7. "Roundabout"

== Personnel ==
Yes

- Jon Anderson – vocals, acoustic guitar, percussion, keyboards
- Steve Howe – guitars, lap steel guitar, laùd, backing vocals
- Chris Squire – bass guitar, backing vocals, harmonica, percussion
- Alan White – drums, backing vocals, piano

Additional musicians

- Tom Brislin – keyboards, backing vocals, percussion
- European Festival Orchestra
- Wilhelm Keitel – conductor

Production

- Perry Joseph – producer
- Aubrey Powell – director
- Bob Cesca – cover art and package design
- Geoff Kempin – executive producer
- Terry Shand – executive producer
- Jordan Berliant – co-executive producer
- John Gaydon – production executive

== Certifications ==
Certifications for Symphonic Live DVD
Region	Certification	Certified units/sales
Canada (Music Canada)	Platinum	10,000^{^}
^{^} Shipments figures based on certification alone.
