= Ambient Den =

Australian progressive rock band

- Origin: Brisbane, Queensland, Australia
- Genres: Progressive rock, space rock
- Years active: 2020s–present
- Label: Desert Comb Music
- Members: Ben Craven; Tim Bennetts; Dean Povey
- Website: ambientden.com

Ambient Den is an Australian progressive rock band formed in Brisbane, Queensland, Australia. The band consists of Ben Craven (guitars, bass, vocals), Tim Bennetts (keyboards, vocals), and Dean Povey (drums, vocals). Following the release of its debut self-titled album in 2025, the group received coverage from several international progressive rock publications.

== History ==
Ambient Den formed during the COVID-19 pandemic lockdown period. Originating from informal jam sessions between Ben Craven and Tim Bennetts, they were later joined by drummer Dean Povey, expanding the project into a three-piece.

The band's name, Ambient Den, is an anagram of the members' first names: Ben, Tim, and Dean.

== Musical style ==
Ambient Den's music blends progressive rock and space rock, characterised by extended instrumental passages, atmospheric synthesiser textures, and melodic guitar-driven compositions. Reviewers have drawn comparisons to classic 1970s progressive rock artists such as Pink Floyd and Genesis, noting the band's emphasis on cinematic structure and cohesive epic compositions.

== Discography ==
=== Studio albums ===
- Ambient Den (2025)

== Members ==
- Ben Craven – guitars, bass, programming, vocals
- Tim Bennetts – keyboards, vocals
- Dean Povey – drums, percussion, vocals
