= Fremont Theater =

Theatre in San Luis Obispo, California

Coordinates: 35.28196°N 120.66059°W

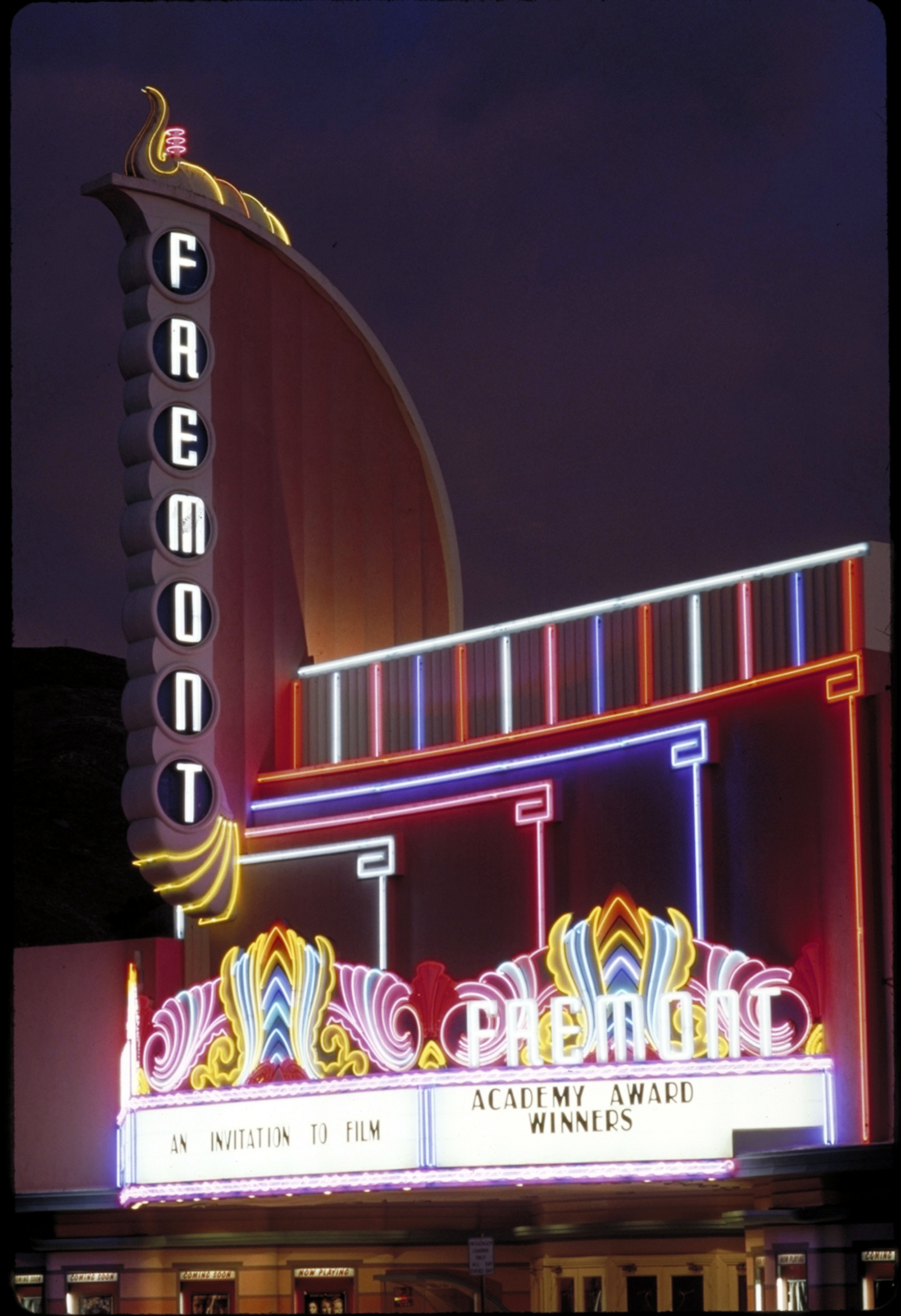

The Fremont Theater is a historic movie theater in San Luis Obispo, California. It opened in 1942 and is among the last Streamline Moderne theaters built by architect S. Charles Lee. Throughout its existence, the venue has hosted live performances in addition to screening films; since 2017 it has been used only as a concert venue.

== History ==
The Fremont Theater began construction in 1940 to a Streamline Moderne design by S. Charles Lee and with auditorium murals by the Heinsbergen Decorating Company. It opened on May 29, 1942 as a 1060-seat movie theater with the West Coast premiere of This Above All attended by Constance Bennett, Jackie Cooper, Stan Laurel and Oliver Hardy, and boxer Max Baer. War Bonds were sold, with Cooper pledging to kiss all women who bought a $100 bond, and almost $750,000 was raised.

The theater has hosted live events in addition to movies throughout its history, including in recent decades concerts by Steel Pulse, Los Lobos, Toots and the Maytals, John Hiatt, Yellowman, Yes in 1996, and Lindsey Buckingham in 2012. Yes recorded and videotaped at the Fremont for Keys to Ascension.

The Fremont was originally part of the Fox circuit. In the 1990s, the then owners Edwards Cinemas planned to raze the building to install a new multiplex, but public outcry saved the theater. The 3-screen Mission Cinemas was instead created next door (which closed in the mid-2010s), capitalizing off the historic structure while also supporting it financially with the additional screens. The Fremont's seating capacity was reduced to approximately 850 by 2012.

The Fremont was one of the locations for the San Luis Obispo International Film Festival. In 2002 The Movie Experience (Sanborn Theaters) became the operator; it closed by 2016. Following a legal judgement against the co-owner and an auction of his shares, developer Rob Rossi became sole owner of the Fremont and the adjacent Mission Cinemas building in May 2017. After a renovation that included installation of a new sound system and further reduction of seating to create space for dancing the Fremont was reopened on September 1 as a concert venue, operated by Fremont Theater Entertainment Group, LLC.

A storm in February 2026 damaged the Fremont's vertical sign. The venue was closed while stabilization and repair work took place; after details of its condition became known, the city suspended its certificate of occupancy, preventing it from reopening for a concert on February 26.

== See also ==
- City of San Luis Obispo Historic Resources
