= Keys to Ascension =

Live album / Studio album by Yes
- Released: 28 October 1996
- Recorded: 4–6 March 1996 at the Fremont Theater, San Luis Obispo, California (Live tracks); 1995–1996 at Yesworld Studio, San Luis Obispo (Studio tracks)
- Genre: Progressive rock
- Length: 116:16
- Label: Essential
- Producers: Yes; Tom Fletcher

Yes chronology
Talk (1994)	Keys to Ascension (1996)	Something's Coming: The BBC Recordings 1969–1970 (1997)

Keys to Ascension is the fourth live and fifteenth studio album by English progressive rock band Yes, released as a double album in October 1996 on Essential Records. In 1995, guitarist Trevor Rabin and keyboardist Tony Kaye left the group which marked the return of former members Steve Howe and Rick Wakeman, thus reuniting them with vocalist Jon Anderson, bassist Chris Squire, and drummer Alan White, a line-up that had last performed in 1979. The group relocated to San Luis Obispo, California to make a new album and to promote their reunion with three shows at the Fremont Theater, in March 1996. Keys to Ascension features half of the live set from the 1996 shows and two new studio tracks which marked a return to Yes writing longform pieces.

Keys to Ascension received a mostly positive reception from music critics, and reached No. 48 on the UK Albums Chart and No. 99 on the Billboard 200. Yes supported the album with a media tour which included live performances at record stores and television and radio appearances, and a same-titled home video of the concerts. After further studio tracks were completed in 1996 and 1997, these and the second half of the 1996 live set was released on the follow-up album, Keys to Ascension 2 (1997). The studio tracks from both Keys to Ascension albums were compiled on Keystudio (2001), and both albums were packaged in their entirety in 1998 and 2010, the latter with the concert video as a bonus disc.

== Background ==
In October 1994, the Yes line-up of lead vocalist Jon Anderson, bassist Chris Squire, keyboardist Tony Kaye, drummer Alan White and guitarist and vocalist Trevor Rabin wrapped their 1994 tour in support of the band's fourteenth studio album, Talk (1994). The tour was met with crowds smaller than previous tours, and the album was a commercial disappointment among the ever changing music scene, with grunge and rock groups Guns N' Roses, Metallica, Pearl Jam, and Nirvana taking mainstream interest, leaving Yes in what band biographer Chris Welch wrote, "In danger of slipping back into an obscurity more dark and profound than at any time in their history". They suffered a setback when, in May 1995, Rabin felt he had done all he could artistically within the group and decided to leave after 13 years to become a film composer, with Kaye following suit to pursue other projects. Squire convinced Rabin to hang on for several more months, but escalating arguments between Anderson and himself convinced the guitarist that it was time.

With Yes reduced to a trio of Anderson, Squire, and White, the band replaced manager Tony Dimitriades, who had been with them since the early 1980s, with Jon Brewer. Soon after the change, Brewer was approached by Castle Communications, a British independent label with an interest in releasing a Yes album on its subsidiary label, Essential Records. Brewer and Castle agreed to the idea on the condition that the album featured the band's "classic" line-up from the 1970s, which included guitarist Steve Howe and keyboardist Rick Wakeman. The pair had left in 1992 after the band's Union Tour and continued with their solo projects, but were interested to return and met with Anderson in Los Angeles for several days to discuss the situation. In July 1995, the five had agreed to work together and make the album; it marked the start of Howe's third stint in the band and Wakeman's fourth. This marked the first time this line-up had played together since their unsuccessful attempt to record a new album in early 1980. Squire later revealed the initial plan of having both Keys to Ascension albums feature just live recordings, but Castle wished for them to contain new tracks recorded in the studio. The group agreed to release the album with the aim of letting the public know that the five had reunited, and Anderson wished to explore the music that the line-up had recorded in the 1970s and take Yes "into the 21st century".

== Production ==
=== Studio tracks ===
In October 1995, the group started writing and rehearsing in the city of San Luis Obispo, California without Wakeman, who joined soon after. They chose the location after Anderson had moved there in August that year and suggested that they work there. Wakeman particularly enjoyed his time working in a small and remote location as it gave the band the chance to focus without "the glare of everything and it gave everybody a chance to spend a bit of time together and just quietly almost reprogram ourselves". To record the new material, the band leased a building that was once a bank and set up a recording studio inside that was later dubbed Yesworld Studio on the album's sleeve notes. Working with them was co-producer Tom Fletcher, with Kevin Dickey, Zang Angelfire, and Bill Smith assisting with engineering and mixing duties. Dickey also edited the album using the Sonic Solutions audio software.

Keys to Ascension contains two new studio tracks from the band, "Be the One" and "That, That Is". When it came to pooling ideas, Squire, Anderson, and Howe contributed pieces that they had been holding on to which were then developed further. "Be the One" is a three-part song credited to Anderson, Squire, and Howe. The former revealed the song covers the idea of commitment and how the band made a commitment to working together once again after a considerable length of time apart.

=== Live tracks ===
The live tracks were recorded at the Fremont Theater in San Luis Obispo, California

In addition to the new studio-produced songs, the band agreed to hold two shows at the city's Fremont Theater on 5 and 6 March 1996 and have them recorded and released with the new tracks. The concerts were advertised online through their website YesWorld, leading fans from around the world to book tickets. To cater for the high demand for tickets, a third show was organised on 4 March. The shows sold out, with approximately 650 people in attendance at each one.

The setlist for the three shows was formed of thirteen songs originally released between 1970 and 1978. This marked the first live performance of "Onward" from Tormato (1978) in the band's history and "The Revealing Science of God (Dance of the Dawn)" from Tales from Topographic Oceans (1973) since 1974. The encores were "Roundabout" and "Starship Trooper". During the selection process, the band rehearsed Howe's suggestion of "A Venture" from The Yes Album (1971). Wakeman, who is known for his overall distaste for Tales from Topographic Oceans, was happy to play "The Revealing Science of God (Dance of the Dawn)" as it was the track out of the album's four that he was most interested to perform. According to Howe, most of the second night's recordings were used on the live portion of the album. The shows were also filmed for release on a same-titled home video in 1996.

=== Post-production ===
Towards the end of the album's mixing stage, Fletcher had to end his involvement due to touring commitments with Steve Lukather. He had completed mixing the live tracks but the studio songs were incomplete, leading Squire to suggest Billy Sherwood, who had performed additional guitars on the Talk tour, to complete it with Smith.

After recording, Howe had planned to remain in the studio and update his vocal tracks over the course of four days, yet his time there was extended to five weeks. He oversaw the mixing process as he and the producers wished for an end product that he was happy with, as he was unable to attend the sessions for the previous two Yes-related albums he had played on. Anderson visited the studio each day during this time. Howe later recalled this time in a negative light, pointing out the lack of support from the whole band, working to get the album sounding right without pay, and the lack of appreciation for his efforts. He concluded: "I thought, 'Wow, never again. Don't call me with a project like that". When it came to producing Keys to Ascension 2, the band agreed to have Sherwood produce the studio tracks on Keys to Ascension 2 (1997). Wakeman was particularly happy with Sherwood's involvement with the project, complimenting his way of working and getting the best performance out of each member.

The album's artwork was designed by Roger Dean, and includes one titled "Arches Mist". The front cover features the band's logo used through the 1970s and the square shaped one he designed for their thirteenth studio album, Union (1991).

== Release ==
Professional ratings
Review scores
Source	Rating
AllMusic	4/5 stars
The Rolling Stone Album Guide	1.5/5 stars

Keys to Ascension was released in October 1996 and reached number 48 on the UK Albums Chart and number 99 on the Billboard 200 during its two-week presence on the chart. Anderson thought the album was not promoted effectively due to the lack of funds at Essential.

The studio tracks from both Keys to Ascension albums were compiled on Keystudio (2001), and both albums were packaged in their entirety in 1998 and 2010, the latter with the concert video as a bonus disc.

== Track listing ==
Disc one (Live tracks)
No.	Title	Writers	Length
1.	"Siberian Khatru"	Jon Anderson, Steve Howe, Rick Wakeman	10:16
2.	"The Revealing Science of God (Dance of the Dawn)"	Anderson, Chris Squire, Howe, Wakeman, Alan White	20:32
3.	"America"	Paul Simon	10:28
4.	"Onward"	Squire	5:48
5.	"Awaken"	Anderson, Howe	18:33

Disc two (Live/Studio tracks)
No.	Title	Writers	Length
1.	"Roundabout"	Anderson, Howe	8:30
2.	"Starship Trooper" a. "Life Seeker" (Anderson) b. "Disillusion" (Squire) c. "Würm" (Howe)	Anderson, Squire, Howe	13:05
3.	"Be the One" a. "The One" (Anderson, Squire) b. "Humankind" (Anderson, Squire) c. "Skates" (Howe)	Anderson, Squire, Howe	9:50
4.	"That, That Is" a. "Togetherness" (Howe) b. "Crossfire" (Anderson, Squire) c. "The Giving Things" (Anderson, Howe) d. "That Is" (Anderson) e. "All in All" (Anderson, White) f. "How Did Heaven Begin" (Anderson, Howe, White) g. "Agree to Agree" (Anderson, Squire)	Anderson, Squire, Howe, White	19:14
Total length:			1:56:10

== Personnel ==
Credits adapted from the album's liner notes.

Yes

- Jon Anderson – vocals, guitar, harp
- Steve Howe – 6 and 12 string guitars, steel and pedal steel guitar, 5-string bass, vocals
- Chris Squire – bass guitar, vocals
- Rick Wakeman – keyboards
- Alan White – drums, vocals

Production

- Yes – production
- Tom Fletcher – producer, engineer, live mixing
- Kevin Dickey – assistant engineer, live mixing, Sonic Solutions digital editing
- Zang Angelfire – assistant engineer
- Bill Smith – live mixing
- Billy Sherwood – mixing on "Be the One" and "That That Is"
- Roger Dean – paintings, logos, lettering
- Gottlieb Bros./Yes Magazine – photographs
- Martyn Dean – packaging design
- Jon Brewer – management

== Charts ==
Chart (1996)	Peak position
Japanese Albums (Oricon)	56
Scottish Albums (Official Charts)	69
UK Albums (Official Charts)	48
US Billboard 200	99

Chart (2010)	Peak position
Belgian Albums (Ultratop Wallonia)	86
UK Independent Albums (Official Charts)	25
