= Alan White (Yes drummer) =

English rock drummer (1949–2022)

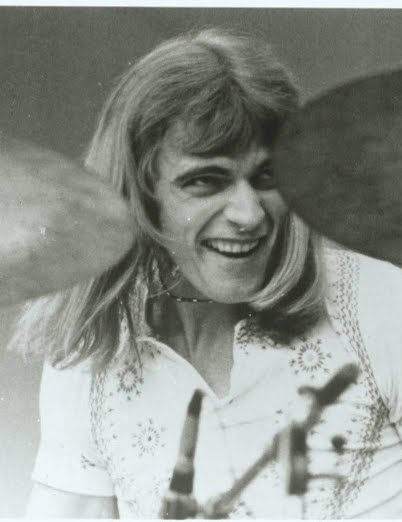
- White in 1972

Background information
- Born: 14 June 1949; Pelton, County Durham, England
- Died: 26 May 2022 (aged 72) Newcastle, Washington, U.S.
- Genres: Progressive rock; pop rock; hard rock
- Occupations: Musician; songwriter
- Instruments: Drums; percussion; vocals; piano
- Years active: 1967–2022
- Labels: Atlantic; Atco; Arista; Victory; Sanctuary; Eagle; Frontiers; Inside Out Music
- Formerly of: Griffin; Plastic Ono Band; Ginger Baker's Air Force; Yes; White; The Syn; Circa
- Website: alanwhite.net

Alan White (14 June 1949 – 26 May 2022) was an English drummer, best known for his almost 50-year tenure in the progressive rock band Yes. He joined Yes in 1972 as a replacement for original drummer Bill Bruford. He was the longest-serving member of the band, and one of just two members (with founding bassist Chris Squire) whose tenure ceased only with his death.

In 1969, White joined John Lennon and Yoko Ono's Plastic Ono Band after Lennon invited him to play at the Toronto Rock and Roll Revival festival, followed by a show at the Lyceum Ballroom. He played drums on the singles "Instant Karma!" and "Imagine", as well as most of Lennon's 1971 Imagine album.

In addition to his work with Yes and John Lennon, White also released a solo album, Ramshackled (1976), and performed on over 50 albums by other musicians, including George Harrison, Ginger Baker's Air Force, Terry Reid, Joe Cocker and The Ventures. His thunderous playing was directly sampled as the drum basis of the hit Art of Noise singles "Beat Box" and "Close (to the Edit)".

White was inducted into the Rock and Roll Hall of Fame as a member of Yes in 2017.

== Biography ==
=== Early life ===
White was born in the village of Pelton, County Durham, England. His father, who played the piano in local pubs, had various jobs, working as a clerk, shopkeeper, lorry driver and bus driver. His grandfather played the piano and his uncle was a drummer in local dance bands. White attended a technical school and, at the age of seven, moved to the nearby town of Ferryhill, where he spent the rest of his childhood. At age six, White began to take piano lessons, playing the instrument "very percussively", which his uncle noticed and informed his parents who bought him an Ajax drum kit for Christmas when he was twelve. White named his uncle as a big influence. White felt he was pushed to learn and play like his drum instructor and wished "to be more individual" on the instrument, so he began to develop his own style. His parents went on to buy him a metallic silver Ludwig kit.

=== Early bands and session work ===
Several months into formal drumming lessons, White joined his first band, a local group named the Downbeats, at thirteen. They performed songs by the Beatles, the Searchers, and Gerry and the Pacemakers. The group became well known in the Newcastle area, playing working men's clubs and dance halls as much as seven nights a week until late. White's school teachers only found out about his activities when the band were featured in the local newspaper. In 1964, the Downbeats changed their name to the Blue Chips and travelled to London to enter an amateur band contest held at the London Palladium by Melody Maker. They won the contest and were awarded money, new equipment, and a recording contract and recorded several singles which did not chart. They returned home, and disbanded soon after.

White reduced his music commitments in order to pass his school exams, after which he became interested in studying technical drawing at college with the plan to become an architect. At seventeen, he pursued music and toured the cabaret circuit as part of Billy Fury's band the Gamblers, which included several gigs in Germany. White went on to play in Happy Magazine, later known as Griffin, with Alan Marshall and Kenny Craddock, and put out several records with Alan Price as their producer. White continued to tour and play with Price in his group, the Alan Price Set, and took up several jobs as a session musician.

In 1969, White received a call from John Lennon who invited him to join his Plastic Ono Band for their live performance at the Toronto Rock and Roll Revival festival. Lennon had attended a Griffin performance in a club and wanted White to join the band of Yoko Ono, Eric Clapton, and Klaus Voormann. White disbelieved Lennon's call and offer and thought he was a prankster, but accepted the invitation for the show which took place on 13 September 1969, at Varsity Stadium in front of 20,000 people. The set was later released as a live album, Live Peace in Toronto 1969. The gig landed White further session jobs, including drum work on Imagine and "Instant Karma!" for Lennon and All Things Must Pass by George Harrison, as well as the opening track, the epic "Govinda", for The Radha Krsna Temple (produced by Harrison). Around the same time, White worked with Denny Laine in his band Balls for several months, which was followed by a ten-week stint with the fifteen-piece band, Ginger Baker's Air Force and Terry Reid.

=== Yes ===
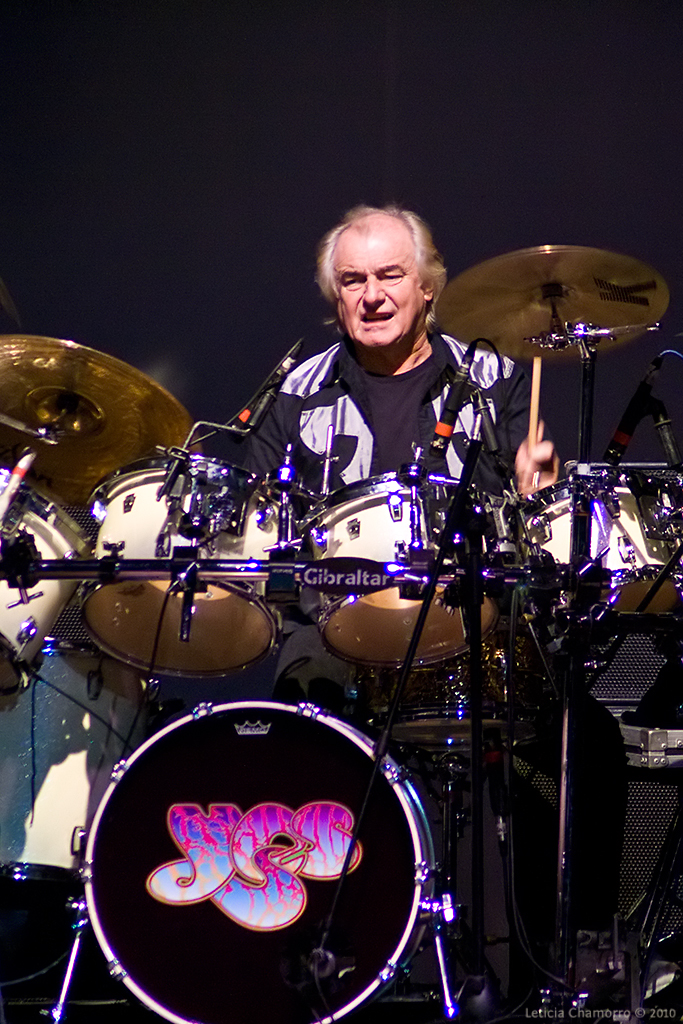
White performing in 2010

To save time commuting to London from the house he shared with his Griffin bandmates in Sussex, White shared a flat with engineer and producer Eddy Offord who worked with Yes on their albums and tours. In early 1972, White attended their session at Advision Studios to record a promotional film for their arrangement of "America" by Simon & Garfunkel. Soon after, he turned up to one of their rehearsals of "Siberian Khatru", a song for their fifth album, Close to the Edge. Their drummer Bill Bruford had to leave the session early, leaving White to sit in with the band for the rest of it. White then joined Chris Stainton's All Stars for a European tour in support of Joe Cocker, which included a show at the Rainbow Theatre in London that Yes bassist Chris Squire attended.

On 19 July 1972, after Yes had finished recording Close to the Edge, Bruford left to join King Crimson. With their supporting tour less than a week away, the band were desperate for a replacement. White then got a call from Tony Dimitriades, who handled Offord's affairs and later became Yes's manager, informing White that the band wanted him to join. Anderson and Squire then met White at Offord's flat, and he joined. He spent the following three days learning the band's repertoire before the Close to the Edge Tour began in Dallas, Texas on 30 July 1972. In the same week, White was offered a place in both Jethro Tull and America. White's performance was documented on their first live album Yessongs, in 1973; this was followed by his first studio album with them later that year, Tales from Topographic Oceans.

White played drums and percussion on over 40 studio and live Yes albums, additionally adding piano parts and collaborating on the songwriting, notably "The Remembering (High the Memory)" and "Ritual (Nous Sommes du Soleil)" from Tales from Topographic Oceans; all the Relayer album; "Turn of the Century" from Going for the One; "Future Times" and "Release, Release" from Tormato; all of the Drama album; "Changes", "Our Song", and "Hearts" from 90125; "Big Generator" and "I'm Running" from Big Generator; all of Open Your Eyes; all of The Ladder album; all of the Magnification album; "The Gift of Love" from From a Page; and "To Ascend" from Heaven & Earth.

White played over 3,070 live shows during his tenure with Yes. Due to various health problems, White missed a 28-date tour with Yes in 2016, with Jay Schellen substituting for him, after which White returned to the live touring band, accompanied by Schellen in 2017, Dylan Howe (son of guitarist Steve Howe) in mid 2017, and Schellen again from early 2018, contributing to some double drumming not seen onstage since Yes's Union tours in 1991–2.

In 2018 White toured with Yes celebrating their 50th anniversary, with founding member Tony Kaye a guest on all US and Japan shows. In 2019, during The Royal Affair tour, Yes acknowledged White's career pre-Yes by performing "Imagine" as the first encore, with the Moody Blues' John Lodge sharing lead vocals towards the end of the tour. The video wall backdrop to "Imagine" featured unseen footage of the Imagine album sessions featuring Lennon, Ono, Harrison, Voormann, White and other contributors to the album and sessions.

The COVID-19 pandemic saw the postponement of US dates around Cruise to the Edge, plus a 35-date European tour which was postponed to 2021 and then to 2022 and then 2023 and later to 2024; White died before he could participate in the rescheduled performances. His last work with Yes to be heard was the studio album The Quest (2021).

=== Other projects ===
White released his only solo album, Ramshackled, in 1976.

During the recording sessions for Yes' 90125 album, White recorded multiple drum tracks which were sampled into the Fairlight CMI (by CMI programmer J. J. Jeczalik) and re-processed in its Page R drum programming function. Some of the discarded parts were salvaged by Jeczalik and reused for what would become the debut Art of Noise EP Into Battle with the Art of Noise and subsequent debut album Who's Afraid of the Art of Noise. Most notably, White's sampled drumming was used as the basis for the early Art of Noise hit singles "Beat Box" and "Close (to the Edit)", anonymously bringing his work to the attention of hip hop and dance club audiences, with "Beat Box" becoming a surprise number one hit on the American dance chart (where it remained for two weeks) and a number ten hit on the Black Singles chart, while "Close (to the Edit)" reached number eight in the UK singles chart in February 1985.

White had guested with local Seattle band MerKaBa on a number of occasions and White and MerKaBa also had links with another local band, Treason. In 2003, White joined sessions for a new MerKaBa album, but these evolved into a new band, called White, and an album's worth of demo recordings under the name Loyal. As well as White, the band consisted of Kevin Currie (from MerKaBa; lead vocals), Karl Haug (from Treason; electric and acoustic guitars, lap steel), Steve Boyce (from MerKaBa; bass, guitar, backing vocals) and Ted Stockwell (from Treason and MerKaBa; keys, guitar). Stockwell left the band and, in April 2005, was replaced by White's former colleague in Yes, keyboardist Geoff Downes. A new album, White, was recorded, partly based on the Loyal demos. The album was released in 2006, with a cover by Roger Dean.

The band played live (with various keyboardists) in the Seattle area. They were due to join the abortive More Drama Tour, scheduled to begin in North America in August 2005, with three acts: White, The Syn, and Steve Howe, with Yes members Chris Squire, Steve Howe and Geoff Downes playing Yes material at the end of the evening (with Currie handling lead vocals). The tour was cancelled shortly before it was due to begin. White later joined The Syn touring band for dates in the first half of 2006. Subsequently, White worked with Yes alumni Kaye and Billy Sherwood in the initial line-up of Circa.

In 2010, the band White re-emerged after a hiatus with a new line-up of White, Haug and Boyce joined by two musicians from Yes tribute band Parallels, who had previously worked with White: vocalist Robyn Dawn and keyboardist Jonathan Sindelman. On 28 October 2017, to celebrate his induction into the Rock and Roll Hall of Fame, White played in a halftime performance with the University of Washington Husky Marching Band.

== Personal life and death ==
White was married for over 40 years to his wife Gigi; they lived in Newcastle, Washington. They had two children, Jesse (also a musician) and Cassi. In 1997, he served as the best man at Jon Anderson's wedding.

White died at his home in Seattle (USA) on 26 May 2022, aged 72, following a brief illness. It had been announced four days earlier that he would be absent from the Close to the Edge 50th anniversary tour due to health issues. Two months before his death, many personal items and valuable musical instruments were stolen from White's home and from a nearby storage facility. Stolen or damaged items included platinum record awards and a drum kit that White had used on the Plastic Ono Band sessions. A tribute concert for White was held on 2 October 2022 featuring members of Yes and White along with other special guests including former Yes guitarist Trevor Rabin.

== Awards ==
As a member of John Lennon/Plastic Ono Band

- 1972 NME Award for Best Album (Imagine)

As a member of Yes

- 1973 NME Award for World Top Group
- 1973 NME Award for British Top Group
- 1974 NME Award for Best World Group
- 1974 NME Award for Best British Top Group
- 1974 NME Award for Best Dressed Album (Yessongs)
- 1975 NME Award for Best Dressed Album (Relayer)
- 1985 Grammy Award for Best Rock Instrumental Performance ("Cinema")
- 2017 Rock and Roll Hall of Fame inductee

== Award nominations ==
As a member of Yes

- 1984 Ivor Novello Award for Best Rock Song ("Owner of a Lonely Heart")
- 1985 Grammy Award for Best Pop Performance by a Duo or Group with Vocal ("Owner of a Lonely Heart")
- 1985 Grammy Award for Best Rock Performance by a Duo or Group with Vocal (90125)
- 1987 Grammy Award for Best Music Video Longform (9012Live)
- 1988 Grammy Award for Best Rock Performance by a Duo or Group with Vocal (Big Generator)

== Discography ==
=== Solo album ===
- Ramshackled (1976)

as White

- White (2005)

=== With Chris Squire ===
- "Run with the Fox" (1981)

=== With the Alan Price Set ===
- A Price on His Head (1967)
- This Price Is Right (1968)

=== With John Lennon and the Plastic Ono Band ===
- Live Peace in Toronto 1969 (1969) (drums)
- "Instant Karma!" (1970) (drums, piano, backing vocals)
- Imagine (1971) (drums on "Imagine", "Gimme Some Truth", "Oh My Love", "How Do You Sleep?", "How?" and "Oh Yoko!"; Tibetan cymbals on "Oh My Love"; vibraphone on "Jealous Guy")
- Some Time in New York City (1972) (drums on side three "Live Jam" at the Lyceum Ballroom in London on 15 December 1969, at a UNICEF charity concert)

=== With George Harrison ===
- All Things Must Pass (1970)
- Radha Krsna Temple (1971)

=== With Yes ===
- Yessongs (recorded 1972, released 1973)
- Progeny: Seven Shows from Seventy-Two (recorded 1972, released 2015)
- Tales from Topographic Oceans (1973)
- Relayer (1974)
- Going for the One (1977)
- Tormato (1978)
- Yesshows (recorded 1976–78, released 1980)
- Drama (1980)
- Classic Yes (1981)
- 90125 (1983)
- 9012Live: The Solos (1985)
- Big Generator (1987)
- Union (1991)
- Union Live (recorded 1991, released 2011)
- Yesyears (1991)
- Yesstory (1992)
- Talk (1994)
- Keys to Ascension (1996)
- Keys to Ascension 2 (1997)
- Open Your Eyes (1997)
- The Ladder (1999)
- House of Yes: Live from House of Blues (2000)
- Keystudio (2001)
- Magnification (2001)
- Symphonic Live (2002)
- In a Word: Yes (1969–) (2002)
- The Ultimate Yes: 35th Anniversary Collection (2003)
- Yes Remixes (2003)
- Songs from Tsongas (2005, 2014)
- The Word Is Live (2005)
- Essentially Yes (2005)
- Live at Montreux 2003 (2007)
- From a Page (Recorded 2010, released 2019)
- Fly from Here (2011)
- In the Present – Live from Lyon (2011)
- Heaven & Earth (2014)
- Like It Is: Yes at the Bristol Hippodrome (2014)
- Like It Is: Yes at the Mesa Arts Center (2015)
- Topographic Drama – Live Across America (2017)
- Fly from Here – Return Trip (2018)
- Yes 50 Live (2019)
- The Royal Affair Tour: Live from Las Vegas (2020)
- The Quest (2021)

=== With Tony Levin and David Torn ===
- Levin/Torn/White (2011): with David Torn and Tony Levin

=== Other appearances and sessions ===
- The Downbeats – "My Bonnie" (1965)
- The Blue Chips – "I'm on the Right Side" (1965)
- The Blue Chips – "Some Kind of Loving" (1966)
- The Blue Chips – "Good Loving Never Hurts" (1966)
- The Gamblers – "Dr Goldfoot (and His Bikini Machine)" (1966)
- Terry Reid – "Bang, Bang You're Terry Reid" (1968)
- Happy Magazine – "Satisfied Street" (1968)
- Happy Magazine – "Who Belongs to You" (1969)
- Johnny Almond Music Machine – Patent Pending (1969)
- Johnny Almond – "Solar Machine" (1969)
- Doris Troy – "You Tore Me Up Inside" (1969)
- Doris Troy – Doris Troy (1969)
- Billy Preston – Encouraging Words (1969) – does not appear at that article, not at AllMusic page
- Gary Wright – Extraction (1970)
- Denny Laine and Balls – "Fight for My Country" (1970)
- Jesse Davis – Jesse Davis (1970)
- Sky – Don't Hold Back (1971)
- Brian Short – Anything for a Laugh (1971)
- Paul Kossoff – Back Street Crawler (1973)
- Rick Wakeman – The Six Wives of Henry VIII (1973)
- Rick Wakeman – Rick Wakeman's Criminal Record (1977)
- Steve Howe – Beginnings (1975)
- Steve Howe – The Steve Howe Album (1979)
- Donovan – "The Music Makers" (1973)
- Eddie Harris – E.H. in the U.K. (1973)
- Johnny Harris – "All to Bring You Morning" (1973)
- Gary Wright – Headin' Home (1979)
- Claire Hamill – Touchpaper (1984)
- Treason – Treason (1997)
- Chris Squire – Chris Squire's Swiss Choir (2007; re-release of "Run with the Fox")
- Pigs and Pyramids: An All Star Lineup Performing the Songs of Pink Floyd – "Comfortably Numb" (2002)
- Various artists – "In the Flesh?", "Mother", and "Hey You" from Billy Sherwood's Back Against the Wall (2005)
- Various Artists – "All My Love" from Sherwood's Led Box: The Ultimate Led Zeppelin Tribute (2008)
- Various Artists – Abbey Road – A Tribute to the Beatles (2009)
