= Roger Dean (artist) =

English artist, designer and publisher (born 1944)

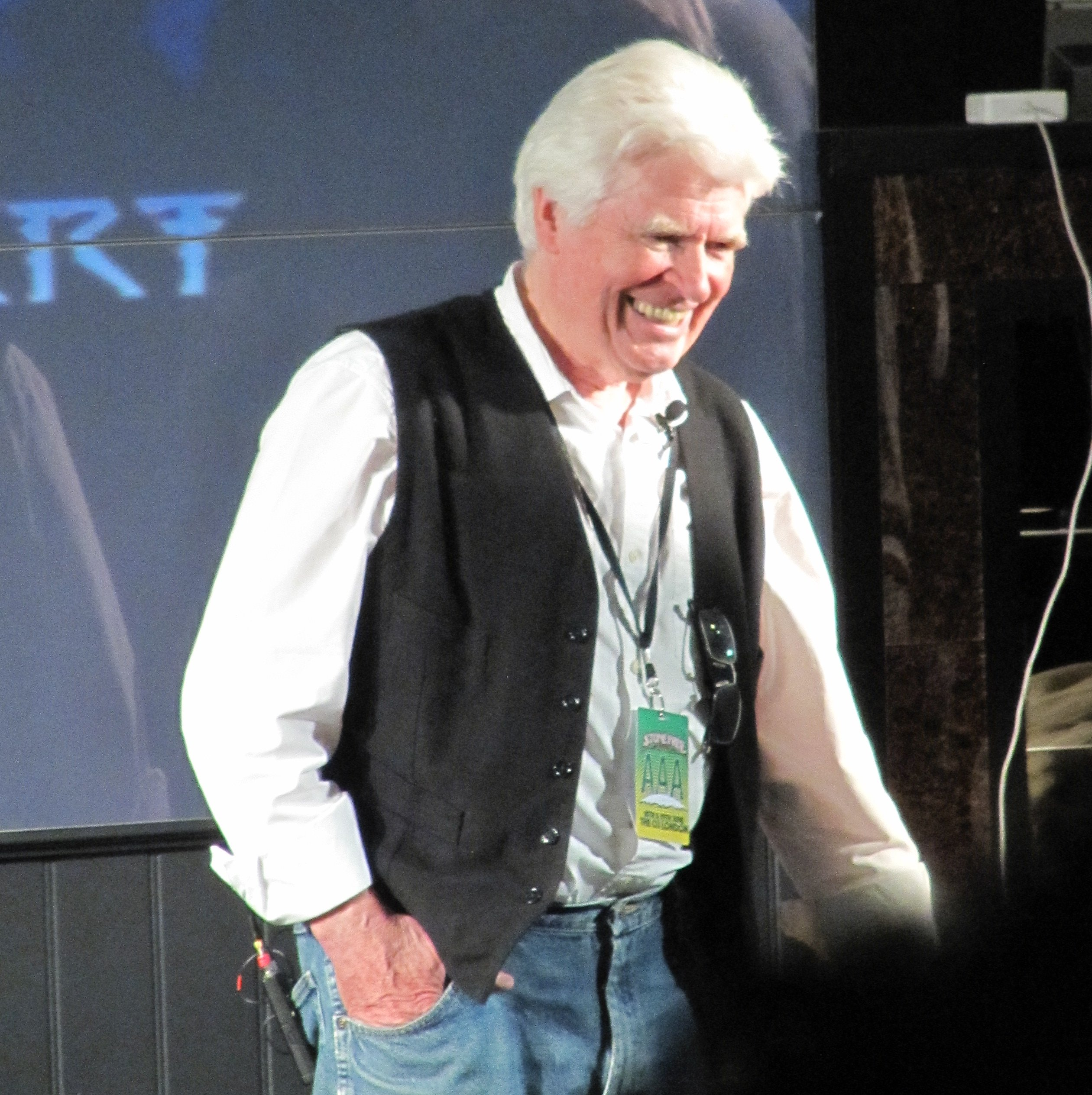
- Dean at the O2 Arena in 2016
- Born: William Roger Dean; 31 August 1944 (age 82); Ashford, Kent, England
- Education: Canterbury School of Art; Royal College of Art
- Known for: Artwork; design; architecture; publishing
- Website: rogerdean.com

William Roger Dean (born 31 August 1944) is an English artist, designer, and publisher, best known for his surreal, fantastical landscapes and distinctive typography that defined the visual identity of progressive rock in the 1970s. Over a career spanning six decades, more than 100 million copies of his designs have circulated globally. His landmark collaborations with bands such as Yes and Asia produced some of the most recognisable album covers, logos, and stage designs during this period.

Dean spent his childhood moving between the UK, Greece, Cyprus, and Hong Kong due to his father's military career. He returned to England in 1959, later studying industrial design at the Canterbury College of Art and furniture design at the Royal College of Art in London. As a student, he developed the Sea Urchin chair, an early precursor to the beanbag chair that was later acquired by the Victoria and Albert Museum. His postgraduate thesis focused on organic architecture and the psychology of domestic tranquility, establishing design philosophies that would shape both his later architectural concepts and his painted environments.

Dean transitioned into commercial illustration after executing design commissions for Ronnie Scott's Jazz Club, which led to his breakthrough album cover for the Afro-rock band Osibisa in 1971. Later that year, he began a historic creative partnership with Yes, designing their iconic bubble logo, stage sets, and dozens of album sleeves beginning with Fragile (1971). His recurring motifs of floating islands, exotic biomes, and biomorphic structures became a central element of the band's visual identity. Dean established a similar long-term collaboration with the supergroup Asia and provided artwork for numerous other acts, including Uriah Heep, Gentle Giant, and Budgie.

Beyond the music industry, Dean's multi-disciplinary output spans corporate branding, architecture, video games, and book publishing. He created the original logo for Richard Branson's Virgin Records in 1973 and later designed the visual identity, box art, and logo for the software publisher Psygnosis. As a publisher, he co-founded Dragons' Dream and Paper Tiger Books, releasing over a hundred illustrated art volumes, including his own bestselling debut compilation, Views (1975).

== Early life ==
William Roger Dean was born on 31 August 1944 in Ashford, Kent. His mother studied dress design at Canterbury School of Art before her marriage and his father was an engineer in the British Army. He has three siblings, brother Martyn and sisters Penny and Philippa. Much of Dean's childhood was spent in Greece, Cyprus, and, from age 12 to 15, Hong Kong, so his father could carry out army duties. Dean was very keen on natural history as a child, and Chinese landscape art and feng shui became particular influences on him during his time in Hong Kong. He has cited landscape, "and the pathways through it", as his greatest influence and source of inspiration.

In 1959, after the family had returned to England, Dean attended Ashford Grammar School followed by his entry in 1961 to the Canterbury College of Art studying silversmithing and furniture design and graduated with a National Diploma in Design. He was removed from a life drawing class by the principal for being "young and impressionable", and was informed he could not take it due to maths and physics being his other subjects, leading a switch to studying industrial design. As the school was trying to become accredited in the subject, Dean bypassed its foundation level course but disliked the way the subject was taught and questioned the teachers as to why people had to live in "boxes" and their response in that "form follows function".

Towards the end of the course at Canterbury, Dean was faced with the option of pursuing either architecture or industrial design; one of his tutors thought neither were for him, and recommended that Dean study at the Royal College of Art in London. He enrolled at the college in 1965 to study furniture design and became a student of Professor David Pye. Among his research was the "psychology of architecture" and what made people feel comfortable in buildings. He did a thesis about "producing a sense of tranquillity in domestic architecture". He graduated from the college in 1968 with a masters first degree honours, and won a silver medal for "work of special distinction". By this time, Dean was interested in "designing the future [...] boxes for people to live in". He considered Rick Griffin's artwork for Aoxomoxoa (1969) by the Grateful Dead as his "first big visual shock" and bought the album prior to owning a record player.

== Career ==
=== 1960s ===
Among Dean's first successes was his sea urchin chair design which spawned from his research at the Royal College and completed in 1967. He filed a patent for it in the following year. It has been considered to be a predecessor to the bean bag, whereby the chair compresses and fully adapts to the shape and size of the user. The design was completed when Dean was one of the few students picked from the Royal College to design and make objects in famed designer Cherrill Scheer's factory. The chair remains one of Scheer's favourite pieces. It is now a part of the permanent collection at the Victoria and Albert Museum.

In 1968, during his third year at the Royal College, Dean was assigned a project which involved the design of a contemporary landscape seating area of the upstairs disco at Ronnie Scott's Jazz Club in Soho. This led to the design of his first album cover, Gun (1968) by rock band The Gun, after owner Ronnie Scott and business partner Jimmy Parsons asked him to use a demonic-themed design that Dean originally made in his sketchbook for his thesis, for the album's cover. Dean revisited the original design and was paid around £5,000 for his work, which was more than he had earned with architecture, and with much less effort. He decided to venture into cover design not purely for the money, but its wider audience and its use "as a propaganda tool [...] showing people what might be and what could be". Dean picked up work where he could, including covers for various jazz artists for Vertigo Records which he disliked, calling them "austere exercises" and too restrictive for the ideas he wished to convey. The experience led Dean to establish a commission before starting work he wanted to do, leading to a short period of financial hardship. At the same time he wanted to release a book on architecture, but faced rejection from 27 different publishers.

=== 1970s ===
Dean designed the logo to the independent label Fly Records in 1970. This led to a single for their musician Marc Bolan, which involved typesetting the liner notes and lyrics, but Dean had not performed typesetting before and completed the inserts by hand with the assistance of a graphic designer, in order to show the printing staff where the text was to be placed. The positive reaction Dean received from his style of writing led to him handwriting the text for further Bolan singles. This was a similar case for Dean's design for Clear Blue Sky (1970) by Clear Blue Sky, where a painting had been completed except the typesetting, "So to bluff my way through the meeting I had to handwrite it all and hope they would never ask about it". The label's staffers were enthusiastic, which gave Dean the confidence to pursue more handwriting, logo, and graphic work.

By 1971, Dean's desire to produce artwork for rock bands had grown though he continued to pursue architecture and headed a small exhibition of his work in Florence. Following discussions with A&R man David Howells, who had assigned Dean the sleeve for The Gun, Dean agreed to work on the cover of Osibisa (1971) by Afro-rock band Osibisa. The design is a result of a brief that Dean described as "credible African fairytale imagery" and features "flying elephants and not architecture", which became an early representation of the style he later achieved fame with. Dean considered the job a breakthrough for his career as the design was made into a poster by the Big 'O' poster company which sold a large number of copies. He later said, "From that point on I could do what I wanted".

In mid-1971, during his search for work affiliated with rock bands, Dean sent a portfolio to numerous executives including Phil Carson, the European General Manager of Atlantic Records. Carson took an interest in using Dean for one of his rock acts, Yes, and hired Dean for the cover of Yes's fourth album, Fragile (1971), which marked the beginning of an association with the band to the present day. Dean pitched a story on a creation myth rather than a particular image for it, "about a child who dreamt they were living on a planet that was breaking up, so they had to build a space ark to find another planet to live on. And they towed all the little bits of the planet with them". In 1972, he designed the band's logo while travelling on the Brighton Belle train, which has been used on most of their albums since Close to the Edge (1972). In addition to their covers, Dean and his brother Martyn worked on the stage design for Yes from 1973 to 1976, 1980, 1989, and 2004. The tour for Tales from Topographic Oceans (1973) featured a nationwide merchandising campaign including posters and t-shirts that led to the creation of the production company Brockum.

In 1972, Dean designed the logo for Richard Branson's newly established Virgin Records label, following several labels and designs he produced for Branson's Virgin record shop in London, such as the carrier bags. A photographic variation of Dean's Virgin logo was used for its subsidiary label, Caroline Records. In 1973, Vertigo Records changed the design of its record labels from a spiral pattern to a pictorial one by Dean that featured two spaceships. While working on the art for Yessongs (1973), Dean and his printers Tinsley Robor secured a patent for "a way of going from gatefold to any number of pages, folded out of one piece of card". In the late 1970s, Dean had an idea for Living in the Third Millennium, a thirteen episode television show about the designs and technological challenges of the future, yet it never made it to production due to budget constraints.

=== 1980s–present ===
In the 1980s, Dean's output focused on other areas, including stage design, architecture, and video game art. He was approached by Italian film producer Dino De Laurentiis to design the costumes for Flash Gordon (1980), but declined as film work required him to relinquish the ownership of his designs. In 1981, he collaborated with his brother Martyn on the Tectonic House, an environmentally-friendly and economic home that was displayed at the annual International Ideal Home Exhibition in Birmingham. The idea spawned from two ideas–Dean's earlier designs for a bedroom intended for the safety of children, and Martyn's "retreat pod" from 1970 that Stanley Kubrick borrowed for his film A Clockwork Orange (1971). The project has developed into its current name, Home for Life, and the non-working prototype contains no straight edges or right angles. In the early 2000s, the cost to produce one was estimated to be $75,000–$80,000. Although several local British governments have expressed interest in the project, none have come into fruition. In 2003, a project involving the construction of 264 villas, chalets, and apartments designed by Dean on a 65-acre site near Stourport-on-Severn, Worcestershire had entered the planning stage.

In 1982, readers of Rolling Stone voted Dean's cover for Asia's debut studio album as the second greatest album cover of all time, behind Sgt. Pepper's Lonely Hearts Club Band (1967) by the Beatles. His logo for the band featured hard edges and sharp corners on purpose, as a contrast to the logo he had produced for Yes.

Dean's first design for a video game was The Black Onyx (1984), which was a collaboration with comic artist Michael Kaluta. It marked the beginning of a series of designs Dean produced for Henk Rogers, who designed the game. The project involved Dean and Kaluta producing an estimated 4,000 drawings for the game, including ideas for its animation, story, music, and motion capture. Dean went on to produce the cover artwork for several Psygnosis games, including Obliterator (1988) and Shadow of the Beast (1989). Dean redesigned the Tetris logo which led to the design of the cover art for Tetris Worlds (2001).

Arches Mist from the Yes album Keys to Ascension (1996) is a characteristic Dean landscape, with fantasy-inspired and natural features.

In 1996, Dean produced artwork for a poster distributed nationwide to commemorate the 25th anniversary of Starbucks.

Dean received an honorary doctorate from the Academy of Art University in San Francisco in 2002, and an honorary fellowship from the Arts University Bournemouth in 2009.

In 2013, Dean filed a $50 million lawsuit in the U.S. District Court in New York, alleging that director James Cameron had plagiarised 14 of his original images in the film Avatar (2009). Although the filmmakers admitted to being influenced by his work, a judge dismissed the case. Dean felt the judge failed to properly examine the evidence provided. "I showed half a dozen different details that they copied specifically from it that didn't occur in nature. But the judge, reverting to this idea that the work has to be taken as a whole and you don't go into detail, he took all my evidence out. Then when he came back to the concept that I'm saying they copied in detail things that they claimed I'd taken from nature, my evidence was gone."

In 2013, Dean received a Gold Badge of Merit from the British Academy of Songwriters, Composers and Authors.

In March 2021, Dean released his first artwork on the digital art auction platform Nifty Gateway, featuring non-fungible token art pieces. In 2022, an exhibition of works by Dean and his daughter Freyja was displayed at the Haight Street Art Center in San Francisco, entitled The Secret Path. Later in 2022, an immersive exhibition featuring Dean's artwork presented in high definition 4D audio and video with laser projections was held at the Gray Area Foundation for the Arts, also in San Francisco.

Dean has two permanent galleries, his largest at Trading Boundaries, East Sussex in the UK and the other at The San Francisco Art Exchange. Both galleries display original works and limited edition prints, sketches and drawings.

== Album covers ==
Known primarily for the dreamy, other-worldly scenes he has created for Yes, Asia, Budgie, Uriah Heep, Gentle Giant and other bands, Dean has described himself primarily as a landscape painter. Characteristic landscapes show graceful stone arches (as shown in Arches Mist) or floating islands, while many paintings portray organic-seeming habitats, such as on the cover of Anderson Bruford Wakeman Howe. Though he primarily works with watercolour paints, many of his paintings make use of multiple media, including gouache, ink, enamel, crayon and collage. In addition to his cover paintings, Dean is respected for his calligraphic work, designing logos and titles to go with his paintings.

Dean was friends with album cover designer Storm Thorgerson of Hipgnosis and the two lived in the same building after leaving university. He recalled a time when they collaborated on an album cover, but it turned out to be "a complete failure". The rise of the compact disc in the 1980s led to what Dean described as a decline in combining music with art, with the jewel case looking "tacky" and a way for record companies sacrificing quality to save money. He cites the early CD reissue of Close to the Edge by Yes as one that particularly affected him as his inner sleeve artwork was missing, replaced with black and white text.

== Personal life ==
Dean lives in Lewes, East Sussex.

== Recognition in other media ==
Dean is mentioned in the 1986 song "Dickie Davies Eyes" by English band Half Man Half Biscuit.

On 19 August 2016, the Isle of Man Post Office issued a series of 6 stamps featuring Dean's artwork:

- "Meeting Place" – produced exclusively for the stamp issue
- "Blind Owl Late Landing" – features the unreleased Blind Owl album artwork
- "Pathways" – cover artwork from Yes triple album Yessongs
- "Green Parrot Island" – derived from The Studio Albums 1969-1987 box set by Yes
- "Tales from Topographic Oceans" – from the Yes album of the same name
- "Sea of Light" comes from the Uriah Heep album of the same name

Dean has had a long relationship with the Isle of Man, and especially with its long-term resident Rick Wakeman, keyboardist of Yes, for which Dean has designed several pieces of album artwork.

The First Day Cover (FDC) was also issued in a limited 750-issue run which were signed by Dean (this cover was issued on 2 September 2016).

On 20 August 2016, an exhibition of Dean's masterpieces went on display at the Manx Museum.

A special FDC was issued on 25 March 2018, to celebrate 50 years of Yes – this was a different cover to the August 2016 one, and was postmarked in Gold to record this historic event and signed personally by Dean who has created a special 50th Anniversary logo. A limited edition of 1000 signed covers were issued.

Dean's artwork was featured in a collaboration with Italian fashion house Valentino for their spring/summer 2020 men's collection.

In the manga JoJo's Bizarre Adventure: Stone Ocean the stand Dragon's Dream is named after Roger Dean's art book of the same name

Dean Venture from the Adult Swim television show The Venture Bros. is named after Roger Dean.

== Covers ==
=== Albums ===
1960s
Gun – Gun (1969); Earth and Fire – Earth and Fire (1969)

1970s
Nucleus – Elastic Rock (1970); Lighthouse – One Fine Morning (1970); Dr. Strangely Strange – Heavy Petting (1970); Clear Blue Sky – Clear Blue Sky (1970); Midnight Sun – Midnight Sun (1971); Osibisa – Osibisa (1971); Keith Tippett Group – Dedicated to You But You Weren't Listening (1971); Nucleus – We'll Talk About It Later (1971); Assagai – Zimbabwe (1971); Patto – Hold Your Fire (1971); Ramases – Space Hymns (1971); Mike Absalom – Mike Absalom (1971); Osibisa – Woyaya (1971); Pete Dello and Friends – Into Your Ears (1971); Rare Earth – One World (1971; inner spread only); Atomic Rooster – In Hearing of Atomic Rooster (1971); Yes – Fragile (1971); Billy Cox – Nitro Function (1971); John Dummer Band – Blue (1972); Alexis Korner -Bootleg Him! (1972); Gracious! – This Is...Gracious!! (1972); Yes – Close to the Edge (1972); Uriah Heep – Demons and Wizards (1972); Lighthouse – Thoughts of Movin' On (1972); Gentle Giant – Octopus (1972); Babe Ruth– First Base (1972); Budgie – Squawk (1972); Midnight Sun – Walking Circles (1972); Third Ear Band – Music from Macbeth (1972); Uriah Heep – The Magician's Birthday (1972); Paladin – Charge! (1972); Various – Motown Chartbusters Vol. Six (1972); Greenslade – Greenslade (1973); Magna Carta – Lord of the Ages (1973); Yes – Yessongs (1973); Budgie – Never Turn Your Back on a Friend (1973); Yes – Tales from Topographic Oceans (1973); McKendree Spring – Spring Suite (1973); Del Richardson – Pieces of a Jigsaw (1973); Badger – One Live Badger (1973); Greenslade – Bedside Manners Are Extra (1973); Snafu – SNAFU (1973); Gravy Train – Staircase to the Day (1974); Yes – Relayer (1974); Yes – Yesterdays (1975); Steve Howe – Beginnings (1975); Dave Greenslade – Cactus Choir (1976); John Lodge – Natural Avenue (1977); Steve Howe – The Steve Howe Album (1979)

1980s
Yes – Drama (1980); Yes – Yesshows (1980); Yes – Classic Yes (1981); Asia – Asia (1982); Asia – Alpha (1983); Barry Devlin – Breaking Starcodes (1983); Nightwing – My Kingdom Come (1984); Asia – Astra (1985); It Bites – Eat Me in St. Louis (1989); Anderson Bruford Wakeman Howe – Anderson Bruford Wakeman Howe (1989)

1990s
Asia – Then & Now (1990); Yes – Union (1991); Steve Howe – Turbulence (1991); Yes – Yesyears (1991); Yes – Yesstory (1992); Anderson Bruford Wakeman Howe – An Evening of Yes Music Plus (1993); London Philharmonic Orchestra, English Chamber Orchestra & London Community Gospel Choir – Symphonic Music of Yes (1993); Rick Wakeman – Rick Wakeman's Greatest Hits (1993); Steve Howe – Not Necessarily Acoustic (1994); Asia – Aria (1994); Uriah Heep – Sea of Light (1995); Various Artists – Tales from Yesterday (1995); Various Artists – Supernatural Fairy Tales: The Progressive Rock Era (1996); Yes – Keys to Ascension (1996); Budgie – An Ecstasy of Fumbling - The Definitive Anthology (1996); London Philharmonic Orchestra – Us and Them: Symphonic Pink Floyd (1997); Space Needle – The Moray Eels Eat the Space Needle (1997); Matthew Sweet - Blue Sky on Mars (1997); Yes – Keys to Ascension 2 (1997); Yes – Open Your Eyes (1997); London Symphony Orchestra – Symphonic Rock: American Classics (1997); London Symphony Orchestra – Symphonic Rock: The British Invasion, Vol. 1 (1997); London Symphony Orchestra – Symphonic Rock: The British Invasion, Vol. 2 (1998); Ad Infinitum – Ad Infinitum (1998); Various artists – Yes, Friends and Relatives (1998); Yes – Keys to Ascension Volumes 1 and 2 (1998); Yes – The Ladder (1999); Rick Wakeman – Return to the Centre of the Earth (1999)

2000s
Various artists – Yes, Friends and Relatives Volume 2 (2000); Yes – House of Yes: Live from House of Blues (2000); TM Network – Major Turn-Round (2000); Uriah Heep – Acoustically Driven (2001); Uriah Heep – Electrically Driven (2001); Yes – Keystudio (2001); Uriah Heep – Remasters: The Official Anthology (2001); Atomic Rooster – Resurrection (2001); Asia – Aura (2001); Yes – In a Word: Yes (1969–) (2002); Vermilion – Flattening Mountains and Creating Empires (2002); Birdsongs of the Mesozoic – The Iridium Controversy (2003); Steve Howe – Elements (2003); Yes – The Ultimate Yes: 35th Anniversary Collection (2004); Glass Hammer – The Inconsolable Secret (2005); Yes – The Word Is Live (2005); Alan White – White (2006); Electric Sheep – Sweep (2006); Asia – Phoenix (2008)

2010s
Asia – Omega (2010); Various artists – Wondrous Stories – A Complete Introduction to Progressive Rock (2010); Various artists – Wondrous Stories – 34 Artist That Shaped the Prog Rock Era (2010); Yes – Fly from Here (2011); Ben Craven – Great & Terrible Potions (2011); Yes – In the Present - Live from Lyon (2011); Asia – XXX (2012); Focus – Focus X (2012); Asia – Resonance: The Omega Tour Live in Basel 2010 (2012); Rick Wakeman – Journey to the Centre of the Earth (2012; re-recording); Yes – Like It Is: Yes at the Bristol Hippodrome (2014); Asia – Gravitas (2014); Yes - Songs From Tsongas:Yes 35th Anniversary Concert (2014); Yes – Heaven & Earth (2014); Yes – Union Live (2014); Black Moth – Condemned To Hope (2015); Linda Hoyle - The Fetch (2015); Thijs van Leer – Sir Thijs Van Leer: Live at Trading Boundaries (2015); Yes – Progeny: Seven Shows from Seventy-Two (2015); Yes – Like It Is: Yes at the Mesa Arts Center (2015); Steve Howe - Anthology - A solo career retrospective (2015); Magna Carta – Tomorrow Never Comes: The Anthology 1969 - 2006 (2016); Rick Wakeman – The Myths and Legends of King Arthur and the Knights of the Round Table (2016; re-recording); Art Griffin's Sound Chaser – Visions From The Present (2016); Steve Howe - Anthology 2: Groups and Collaborations (2016); Yes – Topographic Drama – Live Across America (2017); Focus – The Focus Family Album (2017); White Willow – Future Hopes (2017); DBA³ Geoffrey Downs · Christopher Braide – Skyscraper Souls (2017); Yes – Fly From Here - Return Trip (2018); Focus – Focus 11 (2019); Yes – From a Page (2019); Yes – Yes 50 Live (2019)

2020s
DBA Geoffrey Downs · Christopher Braide – Live in England (2020); The Flower Kings - Islands (2020); Yes - The Royal Affair Tour: Live from Las Vegas (2020); Tony Kaye - End of Innocence (2021); Yes - The Quest (2021); DBA Geoffrey Downes · Christopher Braide - Halcyon Hymns (2021); Ann Wilson - Fierce Bliss (2022); Yes - Mirror to the Sky (2023); Focus - Focus 12 (2024); Yes - Aurora (2026); Yes - Roosevelt Stadium, Jersey City, NJ, 17 June 1976 (2026); Asia - Indigo (2026)

=== Video games ===
- The Black Onyx (1984)
- Brataccas (1986)
- Super Black Onyx (1987)
- Barbarian (1987)
- Terrorpods (1987)
- Chrono Quest (1988)
- Obliterator (1988)
- Shadow of the Beast (1989)
- Stryx (1989)
- Infestation (1990)
- Shadow of the Beast II (1990)
- Amnios (1991)
- Fatal Rewind (1991)
- Aquaventura (1992)
- Shadow of the Beast III (1992)
- Agony (1992)
- Faceball 2000 (1992; in-game background art only)
- Tetris Worlds (2001)
- Tetris Splash (2007)

== Publications ==
=== Books of Roger Dean art ===
- Dean, Roger; Hamilton, Dominy; Capalbo, Carla (1975). Views. Dragons Dream. ISBN 9780905071008.
- Dean, Roger; Martyn, Dean (1984). Magnetic Storm. Harmony. ISBN 9780517556269.
- Dean, Roger; Mead, Syd (2008). Dragon's Dream. ILEX. ISBN 978-1905814411.

=== Books edited by Roger Dean ===
- The Flights of Icarus (1977) by Donald Lehmkuhl. Edited by Roger & Martyn Dean. Large format colour book with paintings by Alan Lee, Patrick Woodroffe, Jeffrey Jones, Ian Miller, Bernie Wrightson, Melvyn Grant, Peter Jones, Syd Mead, Barry Windsor-Smith, Michael Kaluta, Roger Dean, Jim Fitzpatrick, Bruce Pennington, Chris Foss, and others
- Album Cover Album: The Book of Record Jackets (1977; with Storm Thorgerson, Dominy Hamilton)
- Album Cover Album Vol. 2: The Second Volume: The 2nd Book of Record Sleeves (1982; with David Howells)
- Album Cover Album Vol. 3: The 3rd Book of Record Sleeves (1986; with David Howells)
- Album Cover Album Vol. 4: Ultimate Album Cover Album (1987; with David Howells)
- Album Cover Album Vol. 5: The 5th Book of Record Jackets (1989; with Storm Thorgerson)
- Album Cover Album Vol. 6: The 6th Book of Record Jackets (1992; with Vaughn Oliver, Storm Thorgerson)
- The Album Cover Album (2008; reissue of 1977 book with additional prefaces, forewords, etc., by Storm Thorgerson, Peter Gabriel, John Wetton)

== Sources ==
Books

- Welch, Chris (2008). Close to the Edge: The Story of Yes (Updated ed.). London: Omnibus Press. ISBN 978-1-847-72132-7. OCLC 191891469.
