= List of Yes concert tours (2020s) =

The English progressive rock band Yes has toured for five decades.

== Yes's Spring 2020 North American Tour ==
With support from the Alan Parsons Live Project (except as indicated).

On 11 March 2020, Yes announced that they had cancelled their spring 2020 U.S. dates and their appearances on the 7th "Cruise to the Edge" due to various factors including unavailable insurance coverage.

Date	City	Country	Venue
~~Spring 2020 North American Tour~~
~~19 March 2020~~	~~North Charleston, South Carolina~~ (Yes only)	United States	~~North Charleston Performing Arts Center~~
~~21 March 2020~~	~~SeaWorld Orlando, Florida~~ (concert included with in-park admission)	United States	~~Bayside Stadium~~
~~22 March 2020~~	~~Clearwater, Florida~~	United States	~~Ruth Eckerd Hall~~
~~24 March 2020~~	~~Jacksonville, Florida~~	United States	~~Florida Theatre~~
~~25 March 2020~~	~~Fort Lauderdale, Florida~~	United States	~~Broward Center for The Performing Arts~~

== Yes's Cruise to the Edge 2020 ==
On 11 March 2020, Yes announced that they had cancelled their spring 2020 U.S. dates and their appearances on the 7th "Cruise to the Edge" due to various factors including unavailable insurance coverage.

Date	City	Country	Venue
~~Cruise to the Edge 2020~~
~~27 March – 1 April 2020~~	~~Yes headlining the 7th "Cruise to the Edge" Prog Rock Festival~~		

== The Album Series Tour 2020 ==
Yes were due to embark in spring 2020 on their new tour entitled Album Series Tour 2020. The show would have comprised two sets (with full production and a high definition video wall): the first set featuring a selection of favourite classic tracks from Yes's extensive catalogue and the second set featuring their 1974 Relayer (seventh studio) album in its entirety. The (23-date) European leg was due to kick off on 24 April in Lisbon, Portugal and end on 24 May in Leuven, Belgium while the (9-date) UK & Ireland leg of the tour was due to start on 26 May in Liverpool and end on 7 June in Dublin, Ireland with a penultimate show on 5 June 2020 at the Royal Albert Hall, London, UK.

On 20 March 2020, it was announced that the entire tour had to be postponed due to the COVID-19 pandemic and that it would be rescheduled in 2021.

Date	City	Country	Venue
The Album Series Tour 2020 – European leg (entirely postponed due to the COVID-19 pandemic; rescheduled to 2021)
~~24 April 2020~~	Lisbon	Portugal	Campo Pequeno
~~25 April 2020~~	Madrid	Spain	Box Vistalegre
~~26 April 2020~~	Barcelona	Spain	Razzmatazz 1
~~28 April 2020~~	Milan	Italy	Teatro Dal Verme
~~29 April 2020~~	Rome	Italy	Teatro della Conciliazione
~~30 April 2020~~	Padua	Italy	Gran Teatro Geox
~~2 May 2020~~	Zürich	Switzerland	Komplex 457
~~4 May 2020~~	Vienna	Austria	Arena
~~5 May 2020~~	Prague	Czech Republic	Forum Karlín
~~7 May 2020~~	Halle (Saale)	Germany	Steintor-Varieté
~~8 May 2020~~	Berlin	Germany	Theatre am Potsdamer Platz
~~9 May 2020~~	Wrocław	Poland	Narodow Forum Muzyki
~~11 May 2020~~	Tallinn	Estonia	Alexela Concert Hall
~~12 May 2020~~	Helsinki	Finland	The Circus
~~14 May 2020~~	Stockholm	Sweden	Cirkus
~~15 May 2020~~	Oslo	Norway	Sentrum Scene
~~16 May 2020~~	Helsingør	Denmark	Kulturværftet
~~18 May 2020~~	Aarhus	Denmark	Train
~~19 May 2020~~	Mönchengladbach	Germany	Red Box
~~20 May 2020~~	Esch-sur-Alzette	Luxembourg	Rockhal
~~22 May 2020~~	Paris	France	L'Olympia
~~23 May 2020~~	Utrecht	Netherlands	TivoliVredenburg
~~24 May 2020~~	Leuven	Belgium	Het Depot
The Album Series Tour 2020 – UK & Ireland leg (entirely postponed due to the COVID-19 pandemic; rescheduled to 2021)
~~26 May 2020~~	Liverpool	England	Philharmonic Hall
~~27 May 2020~~	Nottingham	England	Nottingham Royal Concert Hall
~~29 May 2020~~	York	England	Barbican
~~30 May 2020~~	Gateshead	England	The Sage
~~31 May 2020~~	Glasgow	Scotland	Glasgow Royal Concert Hall
~~2 June 2020~~	Birmingham	England	Symphony Hall
~~3 June 2020~~	Manchester	England	Bridgewater Hall
~~5 June 2020~~	London	England	Royal Albert Hall
~~7 June 2020~~	Dublin	Ireland	Vicar Street

== The Album Series Tour 2021 ==
Yes were due to embark in spring 2021 on the (24-date) European leg of their new (rescheduled) tour entitled Album Series Tour 2021 and to perform Relayer in its entirety and other Yes classics. All previous 2020 tickets were valid for the new shows.

On 23 March 2021, Yes announced that, due to COVID restrictions across Europe "and for everyone's safety", they had to cancel their forthcoming European & UK Album Series 2021 Tour (initially from 11 April to 28 May) and to reschedule it in spring 2022 (from 12 May to 29 June).

Date	City	Country	Venue
The Album Series Tour 2021 – European leg (rescheduled tour leg from 2020); rescheduled to 2022
~~11 April 2021~~	Lisbon	Portugal	Campo Pequeno
~~12 April 2021~~	Madrid	Spain	Sala Riviera
~~13 April 2021~~	Barcelona	Spain	Razzmatazz
~~15 April 2021~~	Padua	Italy	Gran Teatro Geox
~~16 April 2021~~	Milan	Italy	Teatro Dal Verme
~~17 April 2021~~	Rome	Italy	Teatro della Conciliazione
~~19 April 2021~~	Zürich	Switzerland	Volkhaus
~~20 April 2021~~	Vienna	Austria	Arena
~~21 April 2021~~	Berlin	Germany	Admiralspalast
~~23 April 2021~~	Halle (Saale)	Germany	Steintor-Varieté
~~24 April 2021~~	Prague	Czech Republic	Forum Karlín
~~25 April 2021~~	Wrocław	Poland	Narodow Forum Muzyki
~~27 April 2021~~	Warsaw (date added)	Poland	Stodola
~~30 April 2021~~	Tallinn	Estonia	Alexela Concert Hall
~~1 May 2021~~	Helsinki	Finland	The Circus
~~3 May 2021~~	Stockholm	Sweden	Cirkus
~~4 May 2021~~	Oslo	Norway	Sentrum Scene
~~5 May 2021~~	Aarhus	Denmark	Train
~~7 May 2021~~	Helsingør	Denmark	Kulturværftet
~~8 May 2021~~	Mönchengladbach	Germany	Red Box
~~9 May 2021~~	Esch-sur-Alzette	Luxembourg	Rockhal
~~11 May 2021~~	Paris	France	Salle Pleyel
~~12 May 2021~~	Leuven	Belgium	Het Depot
~~13 May 2021~~	Utrecht	Netherlands	TivoliVredenburg
The Album Series Tour 2021 – UK & Ireland leg (rescheduled tour leg from 2020); rescheduled to 2022
~~16 May 2021~~	Manchester	England	Bridgewater Hall
~~17 May 2021~~	Birmingham	England	Symphony Hall
~~19 May 2021~~	York	England	Barbican
~~20 May 2021~~	Gateshead	England	The Sage
~~22 May 2021~~	Liverpool	England	Philharmonic Hall
~~23 May 2021~~	Nottingham	England	Nottingham Royal Concert Hall
~~24 May 2021~~	London	England	Royal Albert Hall
~~26 May 2021~~	Dublin	Ireland	Vicar Street
~~28 May 2021~~	Glasgow	Scotland	Glasgow Royal Concert Hall

== The Album Series Tour 2022 ==
Yes were due to play their twice rescheduled tour, now entitled Album Series Tour 2022, performing Relayer in its entirety and other Yes classics. All shows in all cities from the 2021 tour were rescheduled apart from the Luxembourg one, and tickets remained valid for the new dates.

However, on 8 March 2022 the band announced that the UK and Ireland dates would now celebrate the 50th anniversary of Close to the Edge. Additionally, on 21 April it was announced that all mainland European dates were rescheduled to 2023 due to "logistical problems caused by the on-going pandemic".

Date	City	Country	Venue
The Album Series Tour 2022 – European leg (rescheduled tour leg from 2020 and 2021); rescheduled to 2023
~~12 May 2022~~	Lisbon	Portugal	Campo Pequeno
~~13 May 2022~~	Madrid	Spain	La Riviera
~~14 May 2022~~	Barcelona	Spain	Razzmatazz 1
~~16 May 2022~~	Milan	Italy	Teatro Dal Verme
~~17 May 2022~~	Rome	Italy	Teatro della Conciliazione
~~18 May 2022~~	Padua	Italy	Gran Teatro Geox
~~20 May 2022~~	Zürich	Switzerland	Kongresshaus
~~22 May 2022~~	Prague	Czech Republic	Forum Karlín
~~23 May 2022~~	Vienna	Austria	Arena
~~24 May 2022~~	Halle (Saale)	Germany	Steintor-Varieté
~~26 May 2022~~	Berlin	Germany	Admiralspalast
~~27 May 2022~~	Warsaw	Poland	Klub Stodoła
~~28 May 2022~~	Wrocław	Poland	Narodowe Forum Muzyki
~~30 May 2022~~	Tallinn	Estonia	Alexela Concert Hall
~~31 May 2022~~	Helsinki	Finland	House of Culture
~~2 June 2022~~	Stockholm	Sweden	Cirkus
~~3 June 2022~~	Oslo	Norway	Sentrum Scene
~~4 June 2022~~	Helsingør	Denmark	Kulturværftet
~~6 June 2022~~	Aarhus	Denmark	Train
~~8 June 2022~~	Mönchengladbach	Germany	Red Box
~~9 June 2022~~	Utrecht	Netherlands	TivoliVredenburg
~~11 June 2022~~	Leuven	Belgium	Het Depot
~~13 June 2022~~	Paris	France	Salle Pleyel
The Album Series Tour 2022 – UK & Ireland leg (rescheduled tour leg from 2020 and 2021); changed to the Close to the Edge 50th Anniversary Tour 2022

== Close to the Edge 50th Anniversary Tour 2022 ==
Close to the Edge 50th Anniversary Tour
- World tour by Yes
- Location: UK; Ireland; Japan; U.S.
- Start date: 15 June 2022
- End date: 19 November 2022
- Legs: 3
- No. of shows: 44

To celebrate the 50th anniversary of the band's acclaimed record Close to the Edge, Yes had announced that the tour dates of the 2022 Album Series Tour would be rescheduled and the band would be performing Close to the Edge instead of Relayer in its entirety. The band decided to dedicate the tour to the recently passed Alan White. A Japanese leg and an American leg were also added.

=== Lineup ===
- Steve Howe – guitars, vocals
- Jon Davison – vocals, acoustic guitar
- Geoff Downes – keyboards
- Billy Sherwood – bass, vocals

with:

- Jay Schellen – drums, percussion

=== Opening tracks ===
- "Turn of the Century" (excerpt of the studio track played through the PA system and projected onto a video screen as a video tribute to late Alan White) (Jon Anderson, Howe, White)
- "Firebird Suite" (excerpt, tape played through the PA system) (Igor Stravinsky)

=== Setlist ===
- "On the Silent Wings of Freedom" (Anderson, Chris Squire)
- "Yours Is No Disgrace" (Anderson, Squire, Howe, Tony Kaye, Bill Bruford)
- "No Opportunity Necessary, No Experience Needed" (Richie Havens, Jerome Moross) (dropped for Japan leg, added back in on 6 October 2022)
- "Does It Really Happen" (Downes, Trevor Horn, Howe, Squire, White) (dropped after Japan leg)
- "Clap" (Howe) (omitted on 17, 20 October 2022)
- "Wonderous Stories" (Anderson) (omitted on 17 October 2022)
- "The Ice Bridge" (Davison, Francis Monkman, Downes)
- "Dare to Know" (Howe) (removed during Japan leg, added back in on 6 October 2022)
- "Heart of the Sunrise" (Anderson, Squire, Bruford) (omitted on 12 September 2022)

Close to the Edge

- "Close to the Edge" (Anderson, Howe)
- "And You and I" (Anderson, Squire, Bruford, Howe)
- "Siberian Khatru" (Anderson, Howe, Rick Wakeman)

Encores

- "Roundabout" (Anderson, Howe)
- "Starship Trooper" (Anderson, Squire, Howe)

Occasionally played

- "Video Killed the Radio Star" (played on 12 September 2022)
- "Leaves of Green" (played on 12 September 2022)
- "To Be Over" (replaced "Clap" on 5, 8, 12 September 2022, 6, 8, 17 October 2022)
- "Sketches in the Sun" (replaced "Clap" on 11 October 2022)
- "Second Initial" (replaced "Clap" on 14 October 2022)

=== Tour dates ===
Date	City	Country	Venue
50th Anniversary Close to the Edge Tour – UK & Ireland leg
15 June 2022	Glasgow	Scotland	Royal Concert Hall
17 June 2022	Manchester	England	The Bridgewater Hall
18 June 2022	Nottingham	England	Royal Concert Hall
20 June 2022	Liverpool	England	Philharmonic Hall
21 June 2022	London	England	Royal Albert Hall
22 June 2022	York	England	Barbican
24 June 2022	Birmingham	England	Symphony Hall
26 June 2022	Newcastle	England	City Hall
28 June 2022	Dublin	Ireland	Vicar Street
29 June 2022	Cork	Ireland	Cork Opera House
50th Anniversary Close to the Edge Tour – Japan leg
5 September 2022	Tokyo	Japan	Orchard Hall
6 September 2022	Tokyo	Japan	Orchard Hall
8 September 2022	Osaka	Japan	Osaka Hall
9 September 2022	Nagoya	Japan	Nagoya Village Hall
12 September 2022	Tokyo	Japan	Orchard Hall
50th Anniversary Close to the Edge Tour – U.S. leg
6 October 2022	Lititz	United States	Mickey's Black Box
7 October 2022	Glenside	United States	Keswick Theatre
8 October 2022	Glenside	United States	Keswick Theatre
9 October 2022	New Brunswick	United States	State Theatre
11 October 2022	Nashville	United States	Ryman Auditorium
13 October 2022	Jacksonville	United States	Florida Theatre
14 October 2022	Fort Lauderdale	United States	Parker Playhouse
16 October 2022	Melbourne	United States	Maxwell C. King Center for the Performing Arts
17 October 2022	Clearwater	United States	Ruth Eckerd Hall
19 October 2022	New Orleans	United States	Saenger Theatre
20 October 2022	Houston	United States	Arena Theatre
21 October 2022	San Antonio	United States	The Aztec Theatre
23 October 2022	Tucson	United States	Rialto Theatre
24 October 2022	El Cajon	United States	The Magnolia
25 October 2022	Riverside	United States	Fox Performing Arts Center
27 October 2022	Wheatland	United States	Hard Rock Live
29 October 2022	Seattle	United States	Paramount Theatre
4 November 2022	Chesterfield	United States	The Factory
5 November 2022	Nashville, Indiana	United States	Brown County Music Center
6 November 2022	Cincinnati	United States	Taft Theatre
9 November 2022	Madison	United States	Orpheum Theatre
10 November 2022	Wabash	United States	Honeywell Center
11 November 2022	Gary	United States	Hard Rock Casino
13 November 2022	Washington, D.C.	United States	Warner Theater
14 November 2022	Stamford	United States	The Palace Theatre
15 November 2022	Torrington	United States	Warner Theatre
17 November 2022	Englewood	United States	Bergen Performing Arts Center
18 November 2022	Bethlehem	United States	Wind Creek Events Center
19 November 2022	Westbury	United States	NYCB Theatre

A Yes consisting of Trevor Rabin, Jon Davison, Geoff Downes, and Billy Sherwood (with Jay Schellen on drums) appeared at the "Alan White - Celebrating His Life In Music" tribute concert at the Paramount Theatre in Seattle on 2 October 2022.

== The Album Series Tour 2023 ==
The Album Series Tour featuring Relayer was set to take place in May and June 2023, after being rescheduled for the third time. Only the mainland European dates were rescheduled. The Luxembourg date, which the band was not able to accommodate in the 2022 tour, was added back. A UK leg was later added.

On 17 March 2023, the band announced that all dates would be postponed until 2024 (except for the final London date, which was cancelled) due to a failure to obtain insurance coverage for COVID-19 and acts of war (specifically mentioning the Russian invasion of Ukraine), with new dates to be announced "shortly".

Date	City	Country	Venue
The Album Series Tour 2023 – European leg (rescheduled tour leg from 2020, 2021 and 2022)
~~7 May 2023~~	Lisbon	Portugal	Campo Pequeno
~~8 May 2023~~	Madrid	Spain	Sala Riviera
~~9 May 2023~~	Barcelona	Spain	Razzmatazz
~~11 May 2023~~	Padua	Italy	Gran Teatro Geox
~~12 May 2023~~	Milan	Italy	Teatro Dal Verme
~~13 May 2023~~	Rome	Italy	Teatro della Conciliazione
~~15 May 2023~~	Vienna	Austria	Arena
~~16 May 2023~~	Zürich	Switzerland	Kongresshaus
~~18 May 2023~~	Prague	Czech Republic	Forum Karlín
~~19 May 2023~~	Halle (Saale)	Germany	Steintor-Varieté
~~21 May 2023~~	Berlin	Germany	Admiralspalast
~~22 May 2023~~	Wrocław	Poland	Narodow Forum Muzyki
~~23 May 2023~~	Warsaw	Poland	Klub Stodoła
~~25 May 2023~~	Tallinn	Estonia	Alexela Concert Hall
~~26 May 2023~~	Helsinki	Finland	Kulttuuritalo
~~28 May 2023~~	Stockholm	Sweden	Cirkus
~~29 May 2023~~	Oslo	Norway	Sentrum Scene
~~30 May 2023~~	Aarhus	Denmark	Train
~~1 June 2023~~	Helsingør	Denmark	Kulturværftet
~~2 June 2023~~	Mönchengladbach	Germany	Red Box
~~3 June 2023~~	Utrecht	Netherlands	TivoliVredenburg
~~5 June 2023~~	Paris	France	Salle Pleyel
~~6 June 2023~~	Leuven	Belgium	Het Depot
~~7 June 2023~~	Esch-sur-Alzette	Luxembourg	Rockhal
The Album Series Tour 2023 – UK leg
~~10 June 2023~~	Birmingham	England	Symphony Hall
~~11 June 2023~~	Southend	England	Cliffs Pavilion
~~12 June 2023~~	York	England	Barbican
~~14 June 2023~~	Glasgow	Scotland	Royal Concert Hall
~~15 June 2023~~	Gateshead	England	Sage
~~16 June 2023~~	Liverpool	England	Philharmonic Hall
~~18 June 2023~~	Manchester	England	Bridgewater Hall
~~20 June 2023~~	London	England	Eventim Apollo

== The Classic Tales of Yes Tour 2023–2024 ==
The Classic Tales of Yes Tour
- Tour by Yes
- Location: U.S.; Europe; UK
- Start date: 19 September 2023
- End date: 4 June 2024
- Legs: 2
- No. of shows: 39

The Classic Tales of Yes Tour started on 21 September 2023 in Bethlehem, PA, with several dates in Continental Europe and the UK following in 2024. A brief Japanese leg occurred in September 2024.

=== Lineup ===
- Steve Howe – guitars, vocals
- Jon Davison – vocals, acoustic guitar
- Geoff Downes – keyboards
- Billy Sherwood – bass, vocals
- Jay Schellen – drums, percussion

=== Opening track ===
- The Young Person's Guide to the Orchestra (excerpt, tape played through the PA system) (Benjamin Britten)

=== Setlist ===
- "Going for the One" (Anderson) (omitted on 23 October 2023)
- "It Will Be a Good Day (The River)" (Anderson, Squire, Howe, White, Sherwood, Igor Khoroshev) (dropped on Japanese leg)
- "Machine Messiah" (Squire, Howe, White, Trevor Horn, Downes)
- "I've Seen All Good People" (Anderson, Squire)
- "America" (excerpt; Steve Howe solo portion only) (Paul Simon) (originally by Simon & Garfunkel in 1968) (omitted on 26 October 2023, 28–29 May 2024)
- "Time and a Word" (Anderson, David Foster)
- "South Side of the Sky" (Anderson, Squire, Wakeman)
- "Turn of the Century" (dedicated to Alan White) (Anderson, Howe, White)
- "Don't Kill the Whale" (Anderson, Squire) (dropped on Japanese leg)
- "Cut From the Stars" (Davison, Sherwood)
- "The Revealing Science of God (Dance of the Dawn)/The Remembering (High the Memory)/Leaves of Green/Ritual (Nous sommes du soleil)" (medley of excerpts from Tales from Topographic Oceans) (Anderson, Howe/Anderson, Howe, Squire, Wakeman, White/Anderson, Howe, Squire/Anderson, Howe)

=== Encores ===
- "Roundabout" (Anderson, Howe) (omitted on 1 October 2023)
- "Starship Trooper" (Anderson, Squire, Howe) (added on 21 September 2023)

=== Occasionally played ===
- "Rhythm of Love" (Anderson, Kaye, Trevor Rabin, Squire) (dropped after opening night of 19 September 2023)
- "All Connected" (Davison, Howe, Sherwood) (dropped after opening night of 19 September 2023)
- "Siberian Khatru" (Anderson, Howe, Wakeman) (added on Japanese leg)
- "I Feel Fine" (Lennon–McCartney) (originally by The Beatles in 1964) (snippet played at end of encore on 25 September 2024)

Date	City	Country	Venue
Classic Tales of Yes Tour – U.S. leg
19 September 2023	Lititz	United States	Mickey's Black Box
21 September 2023	Bethlehem	United States	Wind Creek Event Center
22 September 2023	Philadelphia	United States	The Met
24 September 2023	New Haven	United States	College Street Music Hall
25 September 2023	Portland	United States	State Theatre
27 September 2023	Lynn	United States	Lynn Auditorium
28 September 2023	Westbury	United States	NYCB Theatre at Westbury
30 September 2023	New Brunswick	United States	State Theatre NJ
1 October 2023	Englewood	United States	Bergen PAC
3 October 2023	Washington, D.C.	United States	MGM National Harbor
4 October 2023	Greensboro	United States	Steven Tanger Center
6 October 2023	Charleston	United States	Charleston Music Hall
8 October 2023	Pompano Beach	United States	Pompano Beach Amp
10 October 2023	Orlando	United States	Dr. Phillips Center
11 October 2023	Clearwater	United States	Ruth Eckerd Hall
13 October 2023	Mobile	United States	Saenger Theater
16 October 2023	Cincinnati	United States	Andrew J Brady Music Center
17 October 2023	Nashville, Indiana	United States	Brown County Music Center
19 October 2023	Warren	United States	Andiamo Showroom
20 October 2023	Cleveland	United States	TempleLive at Cleveland Masonic
~~22 October 2023~~	~~Joliet~~	United States	~~Rialto Square Theatre~~
~~23 October 2023~~	~~St. Louis~~	United States	~~The Factory~~
26 October 2023	Denver	United States	Paramount Theatre
28 October 2023	Salt Lake City	United States	Delta Hall at Eccles Theater
30 October 2023	Los Angeles	United States	The Wiltern
31 November 2023	Napa	United States	Blue Note Napa
3 November 2023	El Cajon	United States	The Magnolia
4 November 2023	Riverside	United States	Fox Performing Arts Center
Classic Tales of Yes Tour – Europe UK leg
30 April 2024	Lisbon	Portugal	Sagres Campo Pequeno
2 May 2024	Madrid	Spain	Riviera
3 May 2024	Barcelona	Spain	Sala Paral·lel 62
5 May 2024	Rome	Italy	La Nuvola
6 May 2024	Milan	Italy	Teatro Arcimboldi
8 May 2024	Padua	Italy	Gran Teatro Geox
9 May 2024	Zürich	Switzerland	Kongresshaus
11 May 2024	Vienna	Austria	SIMM City
12 May 2024	Berlin	Germany	Theater am Potsdamer Platz
14 May 2024	Halle	Germany	Steintor-Varieté
15 May 2024	Antwerp	Belgium	De Roma
17 May 2024	Arnhem	Netherlands	Musis Sacrum Theatre
18 May 2024	Mönchengladbach	Germany	Red Box
20 May 2024	Paris	France	Salle Pleyel
21 May 2024	Esch-sur-Alzette	Luxembourg	Rockhal
23 May 2024	Manchester	England	Bridgewater Hall
24 May 2024	Glasgow	Scotland	Glasgow Royal Concert Hall
26 May 2024	Liverpool	England	Liverpool Philharmonic Hall
28 May 2024	York	England	York Barbican
29 May 2024	Southend	England	Cliffs Pavilion
31 May 2024	Bristol	England	Beacon
1 June 2024	Birmingham	England	Symphony Hall
2 June 2024	Gateshead	England	The Sage
4 June 2024	London	England	Royal Albert Hall
Classic Tales of Yes Tour – Japan leg
16 September 2024	Tokyo	Japan	Hitomi Memorial Hall
18 September 2024	Tokyo	Japan	Hitomi Memorial Hall
19 September 2024	Tokyo	Japan	Hitomi Memorial Hall
21 September 2024	Sendai	Japan	Sendai GIGS
23 September 2024	Nagoya	Japan	Nagoya Civic Assembly Hall
25 September 2024	Osaka	Japan	NHK Osaka Hall

== The Album Series Tour 2025 ==
The Album Series Tour 2025
- Tour by Yes
- Location: U.S.
- Associated album: Fragile
- Start date: 1 October 2025
- End date: 16 November 2025
- Legs: 2
- No. of shows: 31

The Album Series Tour 2025 featuring Fragile began on 1 October 2025 in Wallingford, Connecticut, with 30 more shows across the U.S., ending on 16 November 2025 in Reno, Nevada.

=== Lineup ===
- Steve Howe – guitars, vocals
- Jon Davison – vocals, acoustic guitar, percussive accessories
- Geoff Downes – keyboards
- Billy Sherwood – bass, vocals
- Jay Schellen – drums, percussion

=== Setlist ===
"Classic Cuts"

- "Siberian Khatru" (Anderson, Howe, Wakeman)
- "On the Silent Wings of Freedom" (Anderson, Squire)
- "Onward" (Squire)
- "Madrigal" (Anderson, Wakeman)
- "Soon" (Anderson, Squire, Howe, White, Moraz) (dedicated to John Lodge)
- "Wonderous Stories" (Anderson)
- "Circles of Time" (Davison)
- "Tempus Fugit" (Downes, Horn, Howe, Squire, White)

Fragile

- "Roundabout" (Anderson, Howe)
- "Cans and Brahms" (Brahms, arr. Wakeman)
- "We Have Heaven" (Anderson)
- "South Side of the Sky" (Anderson, Squire)
- "Five Per Cent for Nothing" (Bruford)
- "Long Distance Runaround" (Anderson)
- "The Fish (Schindleria Praematurus)" (Squire)
- "Mood For A Day" (Howe)
- "Heart of the Sunrise" (Anderson, Squire, Bruford)

=== Encores ===
- "The Word" (Lennon-McCartney)
- "Starship Trooper" (Anderson, Howe, Squire)
