= Close to the Edge Tour =

1972–73 concert tour by Yes

- World tour by Yes
- Poster to the first concert in London, UK
- Location: North America; Europe; Asia; Australasia
- Associated album: Close to the Edge
- Start date: 30 July 1972
- End date: 22 April 1973
- Legs: 7
- No. of shows: 97 (104 scheduled)

Yes concert chronology
- Fragile Tour (1971–72); Close to the Edge Tour (1972–73); Tales from Topographic Oceans Tour (1973–74)

The Close to the Edge Tour was a concert tour by progressive rock band Yes in promotion of their 1972 album, Close to the Edge. Lasting from 30 July 1972 until 22 April 1973, and including 97 performances, the tour began at the Dallas Memorial Auditorium, and ended at the West Palm Beach Auditorium in West Palm Beach, Florida. The tour was Alan White's first with the band.

Recordings from the tour—both film and audio—were included on the band's 1973 live album, Yessongs. The filmed performance was recorded at the December 1972 shows at the London Rainbow Theatre.

== Recordings ==
Eleven songs from the tour (with no information about recording dates or locations) were included on the band's 1973 live album, Yessongs—the excerpt from Stravinsky's Firebird Suite, "Siberian Khatru", "Heart of the Sunrise", "And You and I", "Mood for a Day", excerpts from Wakeman's The Six Wives of Henry VIII, "Roundabout", "I've Seen All Good People", "Close to the Edge", "Yours Is No Disgrace", and "Starship Trooper".

Film footage of the 15–16 December 1972 shows at the London Rainbow Theatre was the source of the 1975 film Yessongs. Fans determined that "Close to the Edge" and "Starship Trooper" from the film were the same versions from the 1973 album. With the release in 2015 of the box set Progeny: Seven Shows from Seventy-Two containing concert recordings from between 31 October and 20 November 1972, in Canada and the United States, it became possible to identify the dates of most of the remaining performances from the album.

== Members ==
The line-up for the tour unchanged throughout its duration; the line-up was the seventh incarnation of Yes. Bill Bruford left the band on 19 July 1972, after the recording sessions for Close to the Edge had finished. Alan White joined the band by the end of the month, after a number of dates had been cancelled in the wake of Bruford's departure. As he played on the album but was replaced for the tour Bruford was contractually obliged to share album royalties with White, and claims that Yes manager Brian Lane enforced a compensation payment of $10,000 from Bruford.

- Jon Anderson — lead vocals
- Steve Howe — guitars and backing vocals
- Chris Squire — bass and backing vocals
- Rick Wakeman — keyboards
- Alan White — drums

== Tour ==
The tour saw the band play a total of 97 concerts in the United States, Canada, the United Kingdom, Japan and Australia over seven legs—three North American legs, two European legs, an Asian leg and an Australasian leg.

Support came from Eagles, Gentle Giant, Edgar Winter, Lindisfarne, Mahavishnu Orchestra, Gary Wright, The J Geils Band, Wild Turkey, Badger, and Focus.

=== Setlist ===
Setlist:

- "Siberian Khatru" (Anderson, Howe, Wakeman)
- "I've Seen All Good People" (Anderson, Squire)
- "Heart of the Sunrise" (Anderson, Squire, Bruford)
- "Clap/Mood for a Day" (Howe)
- "America" (Paul Simon) (Dropped after 2 August 1972)
- "And You and I" (Anderson, Howe, Bruford, Squire)
- "Close to the Edge" (Anderson, Howe) (Added starting on 2 September 1972)
- Keyboards solo (Excerpts from The Six Wives of Henry VIII) (Wakeman)
- "Roundabout" (Anderson, Howe)

Encore:

- "Yours Is No Disgrace" (Anderson, Squire, Howe, Kaye, Bruford)
- "Starship Trooper" (Anderson, Squire, Howe) (Added starting on 15 December 1972)

Occasionally played:

- Keyboards solo (Excerpts from The Six Wives on Henry VIII) (Wakeman) (Played on 1 August 1972, 29 September 1972, 14, 15 November 1972, 16 December 1972)
- "South Side of the Sky" (Played on 8 April 1973)
- "Perpetual Change" (Played on 1 August 1972)
- "The Fish (Schindleria Praematurus)" (Played on 1 August 1972, 22 September 1972)
- "Long Distance Runaround" (Played on 1 August 1972, 22 September 1972)
- "Can and Brahms" (Played on 19, 21, 23, 26, 27, March 1973)
- "Colours of the Rainbow" (Jon Anderson a cappella song performed just before introducing the next song, "Close to the Edge")

Covers:

- "The Beautiful Land" (Played on 9 March 1973)
- "Tie Me Kangaroo Down Sport" (Played on 19, 23, 26 March 1973)
- "Sakura Sakura" (Played on 10, 11, 12, 14 March 1973)
- "America" (Played on 30, 31 July 1972, 2, 20 August 1972)
- "Waltzing Matilda" (Played on 19 March 1973)

=== Tour dates ===
| Date | City | Country | Venue |
North America
| ~~26 July 1972~~ | ~~Edwardsville~~ | United States | ~~Mississippi River Festival~~ |
| ~~27 July 1972~~ | ~~Louisville~~ | United States | ~~Commonwealth Convention Center~~ |
| ~~28 July 1972~~ | ~~Memphis~~ | United States | ~~Mid-South Coliseum~~ |
| ~~29 July 1972~~ | ~~Little Rock~~ | United States | ~~Barton Coliseum~~ |
| 30 July 1972 | Dallas | United States | Dallas Convention Center |
| 31 July 1972 | Houston | United States | Hofheinz Pavilion |
| 1 August 1972 | Oklahoma City | United States | Fairgrounds Arena |
| 2 August 1972 | Denver | United States | Denver Coliseum |
| 3 August 1972 | Denver | United States | Denver Coliseum |
| 4 August 1972 | Long Beach | United States | Long Beach Arena |
| 5 August 1972 | Berkeley | United States | Berkeley Community Theatre |
| 6 August 1972 | Portland | United States | Memorial Coliseum |
| 7 August 1972 | Vancouver | Canada | Pacific Coliseum |
| 8 August 1972 | Seattle | United States | Paramount Theatre |
| 10 August 1972 | Trotwood | United States | Hara Arena |
| 11 August 1972 | Akron | United States | Rubber Bowl |
| 12 August 1972 | Asbury Park | United States | Asbury Park Convention Hall |
| 13 August 1972 | Columbia | United States | Merriweather Post Pavilion |
| ~~14 August 1972~~ | ~~Hartford~~ | United States | ~~Dillon Stadium~~ |
| 15 August 1972 | Philadelphia | United States | The Spectrum |
| 16 August 1972 | New York City | United States | Gaelic Park |
| 18 August 1972 | Louisville | United States | Louisville Convention Center |
| 20 August 1972 | Memphis | United States | Mid-South Coliseum |
| 21 August 1972 | Edwardsville | United States | Mississippi River Festival |
Europe
| 2 September 1972 | London | England | Crystal Palace Bowl |
| 4 September 1972 | Glasgow | Scotland | Kelvin Hall |
| 5 September 1972 | Glasgow | Scotland | Kelvin Hall |
| 9 September 1972 | Bristol | England | Colston Hall |
| 10 September 1972 | Manchester | England | Belle Vue Zoological Gardens – Kings Hall |
| 12 September 1972 | Newcastle | England | Newcastle City Hall |
North America
| 15 September 1972 | Pembroke Pines | United States | Hollywood Sportatorium |
| 16 September 1972 | Tampa | United States | Curtis Hixon Hall |
| 17 September 1972 | Jacksonville | United States | Jacksonville Memorial Coliseum |
| 19 September 1972 | Cincinnati | United States | Cincinnati Gardens |
| 20 September 1972 | Indianapolis | United States | Fairgrounds Coliseum |
| 21 September 1972 | Detroit | United States | Cobo Arena |
| 22 September 1972 | Chicago | United States | Arie Crown Theater |
| 23 September 1972 | Minneapolis | United States | The Armory |
| 24 September 1972 | Milwaukee | United States | MECCA Arena |
| 25 September 1972 | Hartford | United States | Dillon Stadium |
| 26 September 1972 | Boston | United States | Boston Music Hall |
| 27 September 1972 | Richmond | United States | Richmond Coliseum |
| 29 September 1972 | New Orleans | United States | Municipal Auditorium |
| 30 September 1972 | Atlanta | United States | Municipal Auditorium |
| 1 October 1972 | Tuscaloosa | United States | Memorial Coliseum |
| 2 October 1972 | Columbia | United States | Carolina Coliseum |
| 3 October 1972 | Charlotte | United States | Charlotte Coliseum |
| 28 October 1972 | Millersville | United States | Millersville University |
| 29 October 1972 | Syracuse | United States | Onondaga County War Memorial |
| 30 October 1972 | Waterloo | Canada | University of Waterloo |
| 31 October 1972 | Toronto | Canada | Maple Leaf Gardens |
| 1 November 1972 | Ottawa | Canada | Ottawa Civic Centre |
| 2 November 1972 | Montreal | Canada | Théâtre Saint-Denis |
| 3 November 1972 | Flint | United States | IMA Sports Arena |
| 4 November 1972 | Columbus | United States | St. John Arena |
| 5 November 1972 | Erie | United States | Hammermill Center |
| 7 November 1972 | Pittsburgh | United States | Civic Arena |
| 8 November 1972 | Huntington | United States | Veterans Memorial Fieldhouse |
| 9 November 1972 | Norfolk | United States | Norfolk Scope |
| 10 November 1972 | Roanoke | United States | Roanoke Civic Center |
| 11 November 1972 | Durham | United States | Cameron Indoor Stadium |
| 12 November 1972 | Greensboro | United States | Greensboro Coliseum |
| 14 November 1972 | Athens | United States | Georgia Coliseum |
| 15 November 1972 | Knoxville | United States | Knoxville Civic Coliseum |
| 16 November 1972 | Bowling Green | United States | Anderson Arena |
| 17 November 1972 | Terre Haute | United States | Hulman Center |
| 18 November 1972 | Notre Dame | United States | Edmund P. Joyce Center |
| 19 November 1972 | Kent | United States | Memorial Gymnasium |
| 20 November 1972 | Uniondale | United States | Nassau Coliseum |
| 26 November 1972 | Youngstown | United States | Struthers Fieldhouse |
Europe
| 15 December 1972 | London | England | Rainbow Theatre |
| 16 December 1972 | London | England | Rainbow Theatre |
| 17 December 1972 | Manchester | England | Hardrock Concert Theatre |
Asia
| 8 March 1973 | Tokyo | Japan | Tokyo Koseinenkin Kaikan |
| 9 March 1973 | Tokyo | Japan | Shibuya Koukaidou |
| 10 March 1973 | Tokyo | Japan | Kanda Kyoritsu Koudou |
| 11 March 1973 | Nagoya | Japan | Nagoya-shi Koukaido |
| 12 March 1973 | Osaka | Japan | Kouseinennkin Kaikan |
| 14 March 1973 | Kyoto | Japan | Kyoto Kaikan |
Oceania
| 19 March 1973 | Brisbane | Australia | Brisbane Festival Hall |
| 21 March 1973 | Adelaide | Australia | Apollo Stadium |
| 23 March 1973 | Melbourne | Australia | Festival Hall |
| 26 March 1973 | Sydney | Australia | Hordern Pavilion |
| 27 March 1973 | Sydney | Australia | Hordern Pavilion |
| ~~29 March 1973~~ | Auckland | New Zealand | Western Springs Stadium |
| ~~30 March 1973~~ | Wellington | New Zealand | Wellington Athletic Park |
| ~~31 March 1973~~ | Christchurch | New Zealand | Christchurch Town Hall |
North America
| 4 April 1973 | San Diego | United States | San Diego Sports Arena |
| 5 April 1973 | Inglewood | United States | Los Angeles Forum |
| 6 April 1973 | Las Vegas | United States | Ice Palace |
| 7 April 1973 | San Francisco | United States | Winterland Ballroom |
| 8 April 1973 | Albuquerque | United States | Johnson Gymnasium |
| 9 April 1973 | Phoenix | United States | Phoenix Symphony Hall |
| 11 April 1973 | Wichita | United States | Century II Convention Hall |
| 12 April 1973 | Oklahoma City | United States | Fairgrounds Arena |
| 13 April 1973 | San Antonio | United States | Municipal Auditorium |
| 14 April 1973 | Houston | United States | Hofheinz Pavilion |
| 15 April 1973 | Dallas | United States | Dallas Convention Center |
| 16 April 1973 | St. Louis | United States | Kiel Auditorium |
| 17 April 1973 | St. Louis | United States | Kiel Auditorium |
| 18 April 1973 | Nashville | United States | Nashville Municipal Auditorium |
| 19 April 1973 | Atlanta | United States | Alexander Memorial Coliseum |
| 20 April 1973 | Savannah | United States | Savannah Civic Center |
| 21 April 1973 | Tampa | United States | Curtis Hixon Hall |
| 22 April 1973 | West Palm Beach | United States | West Palm Beach Auditorium |

=== Cancelled shows ===
The tour's first four scheduled shows were cancelled in the wake of Bill Bruford's resignation from the band. When Alan White was confirmed as a member, the tour began at the fifth scheduled show on 30 July 1972. A whole leg, covering South America, was cancelled. Dates and venues were never released, except for the scheduled performance at the Salle University in Acapulco on 1 May 1973.

| Date | City | Country | Venue |
|---|---|---|---|
| 26 July 1972 | Edwardsville | United States | Edwardsville Amphitheatre |
| 27 July 1972 | Louisville | United States | Louisville Convention Center |
| 28 July 1972 | Memphis | United States | Mid-South Coliseum |
| 29 July 1972 | Little Rock | United States | Barton Coliseum |
| 29 March 1973 | Auckland | New Zealand | Western Springs |
| 30 March 1973 | Wellington | New Zealand | Athletic Park |
| 31 March 1973 | Christchurch | New Zealand | Town Hall |
| 1 May 1973 | Acapulco | Mexico | Salle University |
