= Yessongs (film) =

Video by Yes
- Released: 12 March 1975
- Studio: AIOK Pictures
- Length: 76 minutes
- Label: Ellman Film Enterprises
- Director: Peter Neal
- Producer: Brian Lane; David Speechley

Yes chronology
Yessongs (1975)	9012Live (1985)

Yessongs is a concert film by the English progressive rock band Yes. It was recorded at the Rainbow Theatre, London on 15 and 16 December 1972 during the band's Close to the Edge Tour, and features the line-up of Jon Anderson, Chris Squire, Steve Howe, Rick Wakeman, and Alan White. The video was produced by David Speechley, directed by Peter Neal, and co-edited by Howe's brother Philip. The film was arranged at short notice, which affected the quality of filming as a result, and originally a private memento for the band to document their two performances at the Rainbow before they agreed for its theatrical release.

The film premiered on 12 March 1975 at the Cinema Madison in Madison, Wisconsin with Quadraphonic sound. This was followed by screenings in 20 other US cities throughout the spring of 1975. It was released on VHS, Beta, laserdisc, and DVD, before a fortieth anniversary Blu-ray release featuring a high-definition transfer and restored mono soundtrack was released in 2012.

== Background ==
In July 1972, Yes kicked off the Close to the Edge Tour in support of their fifth studio album Close to the Edge, which was released in September of that year. The tour marked the debut of drummer Alan White, who replaced original member Bill Bruford, who left after Close to the Edge was recorded to join King Crimson. It began with a North American leg, after which Yes toured England which included a headline spot at the Crystal Palace Garden Party concert and marked the debut live performance of "Close to the Edge". After a second North American leg, Yes returned to England which included two concerts at the Rainbow Theatre in Finsbury Park, London, where Yessongs was filmed. The performances of "Close to the Edge" and "Würm" are the same as those on the Yessongs album.

In March 1975, Yes concluded negotiations with Ellman Film Enterprises and Aion Films to have the film theatrically released in the US and Canada.

== Release ==
Excerpts from the film aired on the BBC television show The Old Grey Whistle Test on 1 May 1973. The film premiered on 12 March 1975 with Quadraphonic sound at the Cinema Madison in Madison, Wisconsin. This was followed by a theatrical run in Cincinnati, Ohio and Charlotte, North Carolina from 14 March. These three cities were chosen as they were considered to be three key markets for the band in the US. Its release expanded to 20 other US cities in the spring of 1975. The release of the Yessongs film co-incided with the North American release of the compilation album Yesterdays, which contains studio and two previously unreleased tracks from the band's debut line-up. The film was presented as a double bill with Death of a Red Planet (1973), a short film depicting abstract images with lasers and mirrors by Elsa M. Garmire.

In 1984, Video Corporation of America acquired the rights to Yessongs and released the film on VHS in February 1985. The film was released on DVD in December 1997. On 30 April 2012, the film was released on Blu-ray disc with bonus features including Howe's music video "Beginnings", which was considered lost, and a 40 Years On documentary featuring Howe, Squire, and artist Roger Dean.

== Setlist ==
Note: "Excerpts from The Six Wives of Henry VIII" contains excerpts of "Jingle Bells" and "Hallelujah Chorus" from Messiah.

1. "Overture"
2. "I've Seen All Good People"
  1. "Your Move"
  2. "All Good People"
3. "Clap"
4. "And You and I"
  1. "Cord of Life"
  2. "Eclipse"
  3. "The Preacher, The Teacher"
  4. "Apocalypse"
5. "Close to the Edge"
  1. "The Solid Time of Change"
  2. "Total Mass Retain"
  3. "I Get Up, I Get Down"
  4. "Seasons of Man"
6. "Excerpts from The Six Wives of Henry VIII"
7. "Roundabout"

Encore

1. "Yours Is No Disgrace"

Closing credits

1. "Würm" (Excerpt from "Starship Trooper")

== Personnel ==
- Jon Anderson – lead vocals, tambourine
- Chris Squire – bass guitar, backup vocals
- Steve Howe – electric and acoustic guitars, backup vocals
- Rick Wakeman – keyboards
- Alan White – drums
