= Tales from Topographic Oceans =

1973 studio album by Yes

Studio album by Yes
- Released: 7 December 1973
- Recorded: July–September 1973
- Studios: Morgan, Willesden, London
- Genre: Progressive rock
- Length: 80:59
- Label: Atlantic
- Producers: Yes; Eddie Offord

Yes chronology
Yessongs (1973)	Tales from Topographic Oceans (1973)	Relayer (1974)

Tales from Topographic Oceans is the sixth studio album by the English progressive rock band Yes, released on 7 December 1973 by Atlantic Records. It was the band's first studio release to feature drummer Alan White, who replaced founding member Bill Bruford in 1972. Singer Jon Anderson conceived the album's concept during the group's Close to the Edge Tour after reading a footnote in Paramahansa Yogananda's 1946 book Autobiography of a Yogi. The text summarised four categories of Hindu scriptures–the shastras (specifically the śruti, smriti, puranas, and tantras)–which address distinct fields of knowledge. Anderson and guitarist Steve Howe subsequently spent the remainder of the tour developing the album's lyrical themes and musical structures.

Following two months of rehearsals in London, the band decided to construct a double album consisting of four side-long tracks based on each scripture, with runtimes ranging between 18 and 21 minutes. Keyboardist Rick Wakeman was critical of the concept, feeling unable to contribute effectively to the experimental direction required to fill a double album, which led to his growing estrangement from the group. To utilise Britain's first 24-track tape machine, Yes elected to record at Morgan Studios in London rather than a rural location, famously decorating the studio space to resemble a farm. Artist Roger Dean integrated the band's thematic suggestions into the album's gatefold cover art, which later informed his stage designs for the supporting concert tour.

Tales from Topographic Oceans was a commercial success, becoming the first album in the UK to achieve Gold certification based solely on pre-orders before topping the UK Albums Chart for two weeks. In the United States, it reached No. 6 on the Billboard 200 and was certified gold by the Recording Industry Association of America in 1974. Critical reception was sharply divided upon release, with detractors viewing the record as a symbol of progressive rock's self-indulgence and excess, though retrospective reviews have grown more favourable. Yes supported the album with a five-month tour across Europe and North America, during which they performed the entire double album live; continuing tensions over the material ultimately prompted Wakeman to leave the band at its conclusion to pursue solo projects.

== Background and writing ==
=== Conception ===
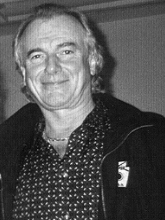
The album is drummer Alan White's first with the band

By 1973, Yes had stabilised with a line-up of frontman and lead vocalist Jon Anderson, bassist Chris Squire, guitarist Steve Howe, keyboardist Rick Wakeman, and drummer Alan White, who had replaced original drummer Bill Bruford in the previous year. Their fifth album, Close to the Edge (1972), was released to commercial and critical acclaim, and the band toured worldwide to support the album between July 1972 and April 1973.

Anderson had begun searching for ideas for their next album during this time, one of which involved a "large-scale composition" as the group were writing successful longform pieces, including the 18-minute "Close to the Edge". While in his hotel room in Tokyo during the Japanese tour in March 1973, Anderson found himself "caught up in a lengthy footnote" in Autobiography of a Yogi by Paramahansa Yogananda which outlines four bodies of Hindu texts named shastras. Yogananda described them as "comprehensive treatises [that cover] every aspect of religious and social life, and the fields of law, medicine, architecture, art..." that "convey profound truths under a veil of detailed symbolism". Anderson "became engrossed" with the idea of a "four-part epic" concept album based on the four texts, though he later admitted that he only had a basic understanding of them. King Crimson drummer and percussionist Jamie Muir recommended Yogananda's book to Anderson at Bruford's wedding reception earlier in the month. (Note: Bruford had also joined King Crimson by this point.) Anderson said of Muir: "I felt I had to learn from him. We started talking about meditation in music—not the guru type but some really heavy stuff." Anderson gained further clarification of the texts from talking to Vera Stanley Alder, a mystic, painter, and author of spirituality books that had a profound influence on him. The 1973 BBC documentary series The Ascent of Man also gave Anderson "a lot to think about", and was influenced by host Jacob Bronowski's explanations of Earth, the Solar System, and human "knowledge and truth".

Yes moved on to Australia and the US in March and April 1973, during which Anderson pitched his idea to Howe, a prolific songwriter and arranger in the group, who took an interest in building on Anderson's concept. The pair held writing sessions in their hotel rooms lit by candlelight, exchanging musical and lyrical ideas. Howe recalled: "Jon would say to me, 'What have you got that's a bit like that...?' so I'd play him something and he'd go: 'that's great. Have you got anything else?' and I'd play him another tune". One riff that Howe played was initially discarded, but it was later incorporated into side three as by then, the two sought for a different theme that would suit the track. Howe looked back on this time as a "golden opportunity" for Anderson and himself to "explore the outer reaches of our possibilities", and avoided predictable choruses and song structures. A six-hour session in Savannah, Georgia, that ended at 7 a.m. saw Anderson and Howe complete the outline of the album's vocals, lyrics, and instrumentation, which took the form of one track based on each of the four texts. Anderson described the night as "magical [that] left both of us exhilarated for days". Anderson and Howe presented the album's concept to the rest of the band, which was met with some uncertainty; Howe recalled: "But Jon and I did manage to sell the idea ... sometimes [we] really had to spur the guys on".

Phil Carson, then the London Senior Vice President of Atlantic Records, remembered that, during a dinner with Anderson and Nesuhi Ertegun, Anderson was originally going to name the album Tales from Tobergraphic Oceans. He claimed he had invented the word "tobergraphic", which he used to depict one of astronomer Fred Hoyle's theories on space. Ertegun informed Anderson that "tobergraphic" was similar to the word "topographic" and described its meaning, and Anderson changed the title accordingly. An interview with Eddy Offord and a Melody Maker advert congratulating Yes for winning a readership poll published in August and September 1973, respectively, touted the upcoming album as Tales from the Tobergraphic Ocean and Tales from Tobergraphic Oceans. Wakeman jokingly nicknamed the album Tales from Toby's Graphic Go-Kart.

=== Rehearsals at Manticore ===
"I think there was a psychological effect of, "Oh, we're doing a double album. Now we can make things twice as long, twice as boring, and twice as drawn out!"

— Eddy Offord, producer

After touring finished, Yes regrouped at Manticore Studios in Fulham, London, a former cinema bought by fellow progressive rock band Emerson, Lake & Palmer, in May 1973. They spent eight weeks rehearsing and developing Anderson and Howe's initial ideas. This resulted in four tracks, as Wakeman described: "One was about eight minutes. One was 15. One was 19 and one was 12", but the band had to decide whether to refine them to fit a single album or extend them to make a double. Howe recalled a mutual agreement to make a double, which Wakeman supported provided that the group could come up with strong enough material. Anderson had gained confidence towards a double from the success of Yessongs, their first live album, released as a triple in May 1973 that contained almost 130 minutes of music. Wakeman described an early musical concept for Tales from Topographic Oceans around the time of its release, whereby its parts could be interchangeable at any time depending on the audience's reaction, thus allowing the band to perform upbeat portions back to back and skip the slower sections until a later time in the piece. The problem, however, was putting such a concept on a record.

The group agreed to make a double album but had no ideas at hand to develop, so the four tracks were fleshed out through improvisations. Wakeman disagreed with the "almost busking, free-form thinking" approach and the musical "padding" that resulted, which he thought needed further rehearsal. He felt sections resembled "avant-garde jazz rock, and I had nothing to offer". Squire recognised "a lot of substance" to the four tracks but at times they lacked strength, which resulted in an album that was varied and scattered. Despite the uncertainty, Anderson stated in the liner notes that Squire, Wakeman, and White made important contributions to the music. Anderson looked back at this time and thought the band were on the same page, but disagreements from Wakeman and producer Eddy Offord marked the end of the period of "illusive harmony" that had been in the group since Fragile. Yes took a break roughly one month into rehearsals, during which Anderson vacated to Marrakesh with his family and wrote lyrics.

== Recording ==
The group were split in deciding where to record; Anderson and Wakeman wanted to retreat in the countryside while Squire and Howe preferred to stay in London, leaving White, who was indifferent, as the tie-breaking vote. Anderson wanted to record at night under a tent in a forest with electrical generators buried into the ground so they would be inaudible, but "when I suggested that, they all said, 'Jon, get a life!'" Yes were joined by Offord, their engineer and producer who had worked with the band since 1970 and mixed their sound on tour. He pushed their manager, Brian Lane, to record in the country, thinking "some flowers and trees" would lessen the tension that the album was creating within the group. Yes were swayed to remain in London, but wanted to avoid the familiar surroundings of Advision Studios in Fitzrovia, so they chose to record at Morgan Studios in Willesden as it housed a 3M M79, Britain's first 24-track tape machine, which presented greater possibilities in the studio. Despite the advantage, the machine malfunctioned often and required periods of down time for repairs. Squire worked in the studio for as long as sixteen-hour days, seven days a week.

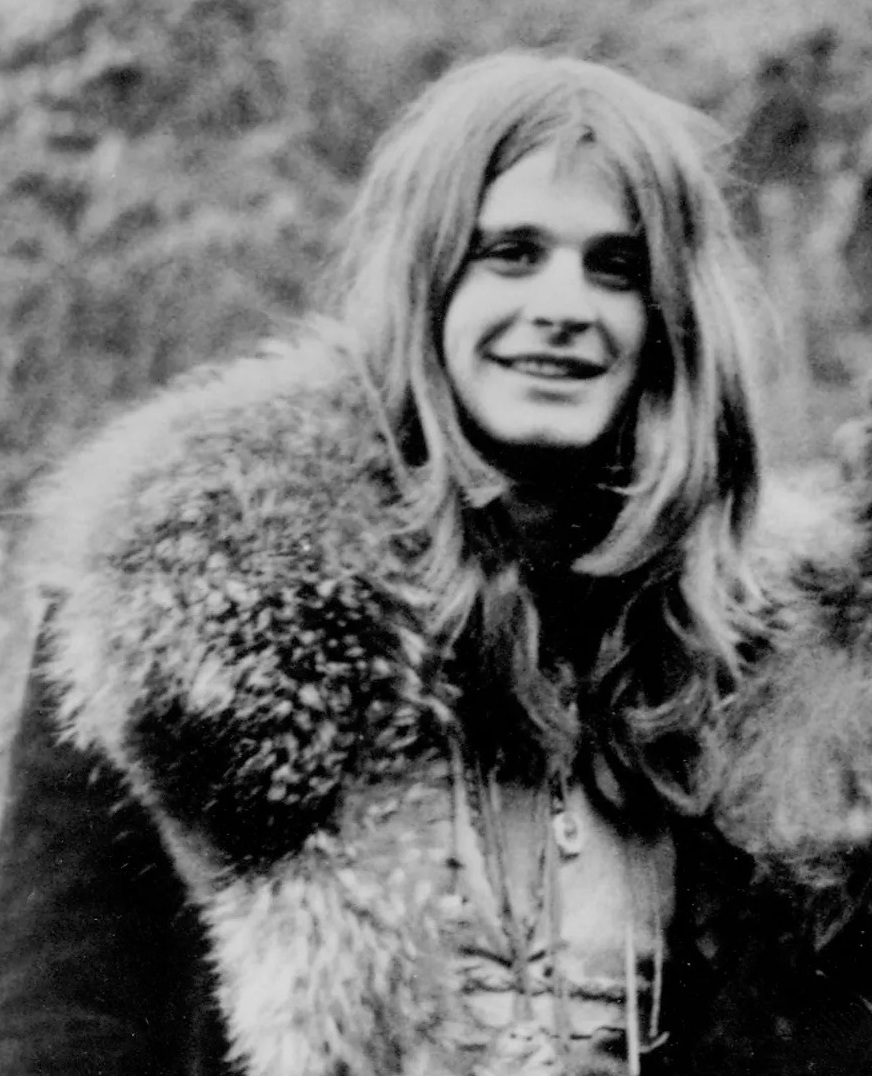
Ozzy Osbourne was recording in the adjacent studio and said Yes decorated theirs to give it an "earthy" feel.

In July 1973, Yes settled into studio 3 at Morgan for a period of ten weeks. Lane and Anderson proceeded to decorate the studio to resemble a farm; Squire believed Lane did so as a joke on Anderson as his tent idea was shut down. Anderson brought in flowers, pots of greenery, and cutout cows and sheep; white picket fences were placed around Wakeman's keyboards with amplifiers placed on stacks of hay. When Black Sabbath moved into studio 4 to record Sabbath Bloody Sabbath, singer Ozzy Osbourne visited and recalled a model cow with electronic udders and a small barn in the corner, "like a kid's plaything." Offord remembered the cows being covered in graffiti and the plants dying halfway through recording, "that just kind of sums up that whole album". One time during recording, Anderson wanted to replicate the sound he heard while singing in the bathroom and asked lighting engineer Michael Tait to build him a three-sided tiled booth for him to sing in. Despite Tait explaining how the idea would not work, he built one using plywood and glued tiles on the inside. Sound engineer Nigel Luby recalled tiles falling off the box during takes. Wakeman distanced himself from the band as recording went on and spent most of his time drinking and playing darts in the studio bar. Osbourne befriended him and remembered Wakeman was "bored out of his mind", and invited him to play the synthesizer on "Sabbra Cadabra". Wakeman would not accept money for his contribution, so the band paid him in beer. While talking to reporter Chris Welch in August 1973, Anderson dispelled rumours that someone was quitting the band, and that a difference of opinion from an unnamed member had been resolved.

Yes spent one week putting down the backing tracks for each of the four songs, after which they worked on the overdubs. Howe said a considerable amount of time was spent on both tasks, and took turns with Anderson to lead and convince the other members when they questioned if the arrangements were going to work. Anderson recalled a near-disaster situation with the finished tapes. After working through the night with Offord to complete the last mix, the pair left Morgan at dawn and Offord placed the tapes on the roof of his car to find the keys. He proceeded to drive off, forgetting about the tapes. They stopped the car to find the tapes had fallen onto the road, and Anderson rushed back to save them from an oncoming bus. The tapes were unharmed from the incident. Yes had spent five months arranging, rehearsing, and recording Tales from Topographic Oceans, and their time spent in Morgan amounted to £90,000 in studio costs.

== Songs ==
"Side one was the commercial or easy-listening side of Topographic Oceans, side two was a much lighter, folky side of Yes, side three was electronic mayhem turning into acoustic simplicity, and side four was us trying to drive the whole thing home on a biggie."

— Steve Howe

The album contains four tracks, or "movements", as described by Anderson, that range between 18 and 21 minutes. All band members are credited for composing the music. Anderson provided a short description of how the album came together, and how its concept is expressed in a musical sense in each track, in the album's liner notes. The original LP lists Anderson and Howe as co-writers of the lyrics, but the 2003 reissue lists Squire as an additional co-author for "The Ancient" and Squire, Wakeman, and White as additional co-authors for "The Remembering".

"The Revealing Science of God (Dance of the Dawn)" is based on the shruti, which Yogananda described as scriptures that are "directly heard" or "revealed", in particular the Vedas. Regarding its title, Anderson said: "It's always delicate to start talking about religious things ... [it] should have just been 'The Revealing'. But I got sort of hip." The track was originally 28 minutes long, but six minutes were cut due to the time constraints of a record. Anderson was inspired to open the track with voices that gradually build from listening to Gregorian chants, and used the Vietnam War as a source for its lyrics. Howe plays a Gibson ES-345, and his solos were influenced by his belief that Frank Zappa performed lengthy solos "because the audience wanted it. I was thinking at one stage, 'I'll do that. They'll love it'. The "Young Christians see it" section originated from an unused take from the Fragile sessions, a take from which was released as a bonus track in 2015 as "All Fighters Past". White recalled the group spent around six days mixing the track. The 2003 CD reissue of the album includes a previously unreleased two minute introduction.

"The Remembering (High the Memory)" relates to the smriti, texts literally meaning "that which is remembered". Yogananda wrote the smritis were "written down in a remote past as the world's longest epic poems", specifically the Mahabharata and Ramayana. Anderson described it as "a calm sea of music" and wanted the band to play like the sea with "rhythms, eddies, swells, and undercurrents" of sound. The track includes a keyboard solo that Anderson wrote "bring[s] alive the ebb and flow and depth of our mind's eye", and rated it as one of Wakeman's best. Squire played a fretless Guild bass, and described his performance as "one of the nicest things" he has done, and ranked it higher than his playing on more popular songs. He considered the track was particularly successful in its arrangement. White came up with the chord basis of a section on a guitar, which he does not play confidently, but Anderson recognised his tune and told him to repeat it until he could grasp his idea. Howe plays a Danelectro electric sitar, lute, and acoustic guitar.

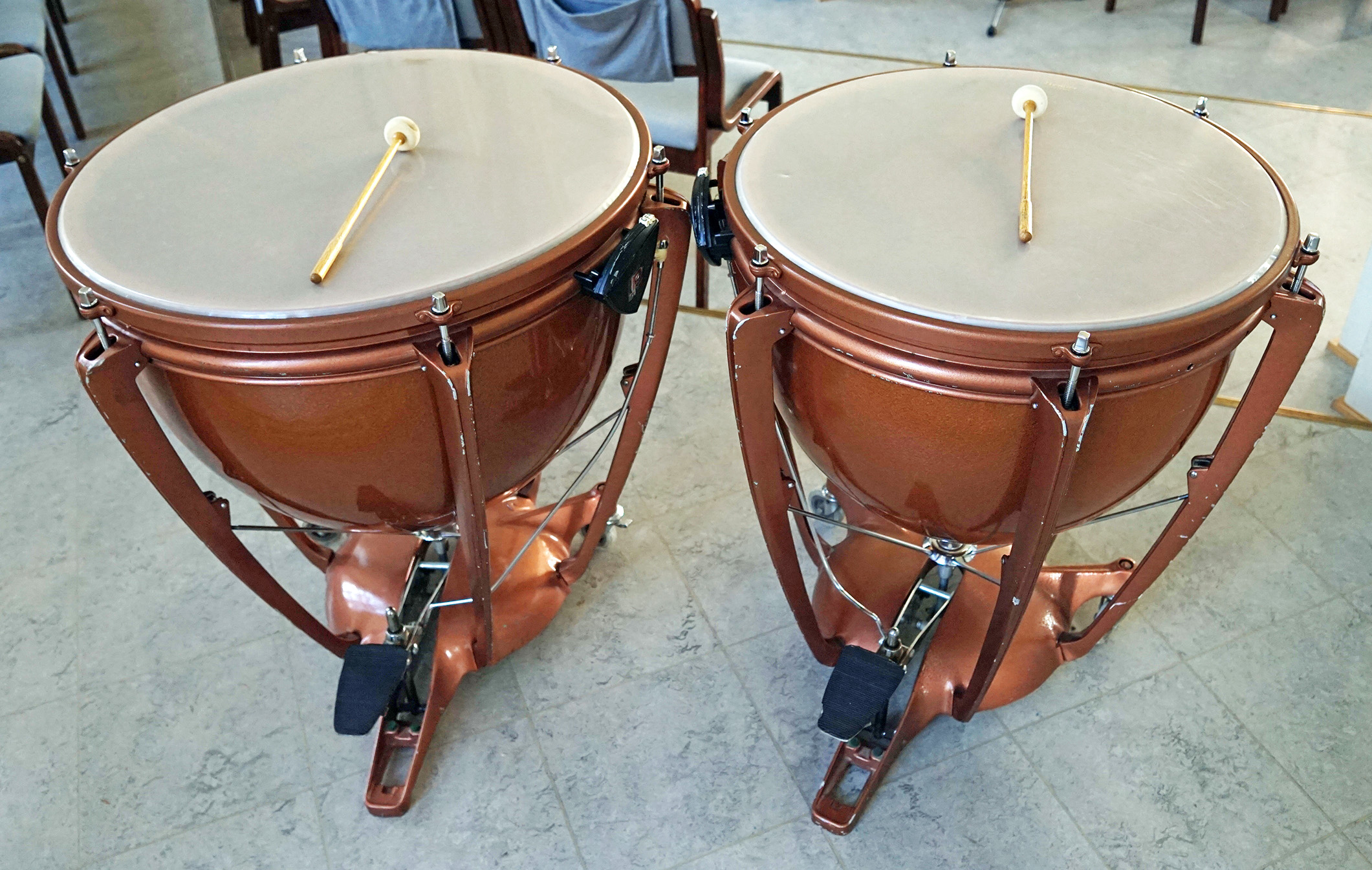
"Ritual" features the group playing percussion and timpani (pictured), which they recreated on stage

"The Ancient (Giants Under the Sun)" is attributed to the puranas, meaning "of ancient times", which contain eighteen "ancient" allegories. "Steve's guitar", wrote Anderson, "is pivotal in sharpening reflection on the beauties and treasures of lost civilisations." The lyrics contain several translations of the word "Sun" or an explanation of the Sun from various languages. Howe felt the opening section amazes him to this day, thinking how the band could "go so far out". He plays a steel guitar and a Spanish Ramirez acoustic guitar, and described it as "quite Stravinsky, quite folky". To help achieve the right sound he wanted out of his guitars, Howe played several recordings by classical guitarist Julian Bream to Offord as a guide. The track ends with an acoustic-based song which later became known as "Leaves of Green". White used a hollowed out log and brushes on an aluminium sheet as percussion.

"Ritual (Nous sommes du soleil)" relates to the tantras, literally meaning rites or rituals. Anderson described its bass and drum solos as a presentation of the fight and struggle that life presents between "sources of evil and pure love". Howe is particularly fond of his guitar solo at the beginning, which to him was "spine-chilling" and "heavenly to play", and uses a Gibson Les Paul Junior. He wrote the chords and some lyrics to the "Life is like a fight" section. His outro guitar solo was more improvised and jazz-oriented at first, but the rest of the group felt dissatisfied with the arrangement. Anderson suggested that Howe pick several themes from the album and combine them, which Howe did with "a more concise, more thematic approach". During one of Wakeman's absences from the studio, White came up with the piano sequence for the closing "Nous sommes du soleil" section. The second half contains a percussion jam that features the main melody played on the drums. White, who played a standard kit, taught the sequence to the other members, with Anderson on a cocktail kit and Squire on timpani. Howe, despite participating on the drum solo on stage early on, opted out as it affected his guitar playing afterward.

== Artwork ==
The album was packaged as a gatefold sleeve designed and illustrated by Roger Dean, who had also designed the artwork for Fragile, Close to the Edge, and Yessongs. Each of them carried a loose narrative thread that Dean did not continue for Tales from Topographic Oceans. Dean and Anderson discussed ideas for the cover during a flight from London to Tokyo via Anchorage, Alaska, for the Japanese leg of the Close to the Edge Tour. Prior to the flight, Dean had completed the artwork to John Michell's book The View over Atlantis. He recalled: "The wives and girlfriends made a cake ... and we all had some. I have no idea what was in it but from London to Anchorage, I was stoned ... But from Anchorage to Tokyo, I couldn't stop talking. And I was telling Jon all about this book, about patterns in the landscape and dragon lines, and we were flying hour after hour after hour over the most amazing landscapes ... So the idea of ... a sort of magical landscape and an alternative landscape ... that informed everything: the album cover, the merchandising, the stage."

Anderson requested that the Mayan temple at Chichen Itza be on the album's sleeve

Dean, who primarily describes himself as a landscape painter, wished to convey his enthusiasm for landscapes on the cover, and everything depicted in the design is of something that exists. Painted using watercolour and ink, the front depicts fish circling a waterfall under several constellations of stars. In his book Views, Dean explained that the final collection of landmarks on the front was more complex than intended "because it seemed appropriate to the nature of the project that everyone who wanted to contribute should do so." Anderson wanted a Mayan temple at Chichen Itza with the sun behind it, and White suggested using markings from the plains of Nazca. The landscape comprised, amongst other things, famous English rocks taken from Dominy Hamilton's postcard collection, including Brimham Rocks, the last rocks at Land's End, Logan Rock at Treen, and single stones from Avebury and Stonehenge. Dean thought "the result is a somewhat incongruous mixture, but effective nonetheless."

Initial pressings included a slipstream in the background behind the fish that was removed from later copies. Although it was not a part of the original design, Anderson persuaded Dean to add it after it had been painted, so Dean drew it on a clear cel and photographed the cover with and without the slipstream. Dean thought the idea still did not work, and used the original design for the advertisements and posters. In 2002, readers of Rolling Stone magazine voted the album's cover as the best cover art of all time.

== Release ==
The album was finished in the first week of November 1973, and aired on British radio several times before its release in stores. It was set for broadcast on David Jensen's show on Radio Luxembourg on 8 November, but according to Anderson, the radio station somehow received blank tapes, resulting in dead air after the album was introduced. Two more radio broadcasts followed, one on Your Mother Wouldn't Like It hosted by Nicky Horne on Capital Radio on 9 November, and on Rock on Radio One with Pete Drummond on BBC Radio 1 the following day. A listening session was held at Morgan, which studio engineer and manager Roger Quested attended and remembered rows of seats laid out by a set of speakers before the whole album was played. "All but the diehard had drifted away before it had finished." Radio consultant Lee Abrams recalled the risk and difficulty in getting the album played on American radio, with many stations mainly playing "The Revealing Science of God" and primarily at night hours.

The album was released in the UK on 7 December 1973, followed by its North American release on 9 January 1974. It was a commercial success for the group; following a change in industry regulations by the British Phonographic Industry for albums to qualify for a Gold disc in April 1973, the album became the first UK record to reach Gold certification based on pre-orders alone after 75,000 orders were made. It was number 1 on the UK Album Chart for two consecutive weeks and peaked at number 6 on the US Billboard Top LPs chart. The album was certified Gold in the UK on 1 March 1974 and in the US on 8 February 1974, the latter for surpassing 500,000 copies.

== Reception ==
=== Early reviews ===
The album initially received a divided reaction from British critics. Robert Sheldon for The Times termed the music as "rockophonic", and selected "The Ancient" as a piece of music that "will be studied twenty-five years hence as a turning point in modern music". The Guardian newspaper thought Anderson's "high-pitched and carefully modulated voice ... seemed at ease and control". Steve Peacock reviewed the album and a live performance of it for Sounds magazine using the headlines "Wishy washy tales from the deep" and "Close to boredom". Critic and Yes biographer Chris Welch reviewed the album for Melody Maker and wrote: "It is a fragmented masterpiece, assembled with loving care and long hours in the studio. Brilliant in patches, but often taking far too long to make its various points, and curiously lacking in warmth or personal expression". He thought "Ritual" brought the "first enjoyable moments" of the entire album, "where Alan's driving drums have something to grip on to and the lyrics of la la la speak volumes. But even this cannot last long and cohesion is lost once more to the gods of drab self-indulgence." For New Musical Express, Steve Clarke, who had listened to the album for two months and saw the band perform the album live once, declared the album "a great disappointment", coming from the strength of Close to the Edge and notes the "colour and excitement" that the group usually puts on their albums was missing. He thought Wakeman's abilities were restricted, and a lack of "positive construction" in the music which too often loses itself to "a wash of synthetic sounds". Howe's guitar adopts the same tone as Wakeman's keyboards, which bored Clarke, but Anderson was praised in helping carry the music through with his "frail, pure and at times very beautiful" voice. Clarke concluded with a hope of Yes making a return to "real songs" which demonstrate their musicianship better.

The album also received mixed reviews in America. Abrams thought it could have received better marketing, and suggested "an experiment in recording" as a tag line. Record World magazine considered it "by far the most progressive album to date" and displays the talents of each band member well, particularly Wakeman's. A review in Billboard said the four sides produce mixed results, with Anderson's "weighty spiritual concept" having "indigestible lyrics that are fortunately outplayed by the band's rich, sweeping playing" and praised Wakeman's keyboards in particular. It concluded with "Ritual (Nous sommes du soleil)" as the most "complete" track. In his negative review for Rolling Stone, Gordon Fletcher described the record as "psychedelic doodles" and thought it suffers from "over-elaboration" compared to more successful songs on Fragile and Close to the Edge. He complained about the album's length, Howe's guitar solos on "The Ancient", and the percussion section on "Ritual", but praised Wakeman for his "stellar performance" throughout and believed the keyboardist was the "most human of the group". Fletcher singled out the acoustic guitar section from "The Ancient" as the album's high point. Cash Box magazine praised the album with its "spectacular cuts" making a "phenomenal" record, and noted the band "are as much in touch with the bright future of their art form as they are with its rich, traditional past". Wakeman's "inspirational" playing was also pointed out, which "sparkles" throughout the album. It concluded with "one of this year's best without doubt." In September 1974, Time magazine called it "by far the most provocative album of the past year."

=== Later reviews ===
Professional ratings
Review scores
Source	Rating
All About Jazz	5/5 stars
AllMusic	3.5/5 stars
Pitchfork	2.2/10
Christgau's Record Guide	C
The Rolling Stone Album Guide	4/5 stars

Retrospectively, Bruce Eder of AllMusic thought the album contains "some of the most sublimely beautiful musical passages ever to come from the group, and develops a major chunk of that music in depth and degrees in ways that one can only marvel at, though there's a big leap from marvel to enjoy. If one can grab onto it, Tales is a long, sometimes glorious musical ride across landscapes strange and wonderful, thick with enticing musical textures". In its fortieth anniversary issue from 1992, NME selected Tales from Topographic Oceans as their "40 Records That Captured The Moment". In 1996, Progression magazine writer John Covach wrote that it is Tales from Topographic Oceans, not Close to the Edge, that represents the band's true hallmark of the first half of their 1970s output and their "real point of arrival". He pointed out "the playing is virtuosic throughout, the singing innovative and often complex, and the lyrics mystical and poetic. All this having been asserted ... even the most devoted listener to Tales is also forced to admit that the album is in many ways flawed. Tracks tend to wander a bit ... and the music therefore is perhaps not as focused as it might be." He notes that while Howe "set a new standard for rock guitar", he thought Wakeman's parts were not used properly and that the keyboardist was instead "relegated to the role of sideman". Author and critic Martin Popoff called the album the "black hole of Yes experiences, the band dissipating, expanding, exploding and imploding all at once", though he thought it contained "some fairly accessible music".

=== Band members ===
In January 1974, Squire picked The Yes Album and Tales from Topographic Oceans as the two most personally satisfying Yes albums "in terms of being captivated". In 1984, after Yes had released 90125 (1983), Anderson looked back on Tales from Topographic Oceans as "difficult in some respects", but felt it was "stupid to even think about defending it." In 1990, he said that he was pleased with three quarters of the album, with the remaining quarter "not quite jelling", but the tight deadline to finish it meant there was little time to make the necessary changes. Squire recalled the album as an unhappy period in the band's history, and commented on Anderson's attitude then: "Jon had this visionary idea that you could just walk into a studio, and if the vibes were right ... the music would be great at the end of the day ... It isn't reality". Wakeman continues to hold a mostly critical view. In 2006, he clarified that there are some "very nice musical moments in Topographic Oceans, but because of the format of how records used to be we had too much for a single album but not enough for a double, so we padded it out and the padding is awful ... but there are some beautiful solos like "Nous sommes du soleil" ... one of the most beautiful melodies ... and deserved to be developed even more perhaps." In 2023, Steve Howe stated that the album was for the band "a time of spreading our wings, a wonderful project where we went to the ends of the Earth to do it. There was often a feeling that disaster was almost about to strike, but we got there in the end. You have to account for Tales in our history to properly talk about what Yes achieved, because it was quite exceptional. I don’t think we’d be the same group without it", adding that he was "still very proud of it and very pleased with it [...] "Tales is totally epic, and I love it to bits".

== Reissues ==
Anderson spoke about his wish to edit the album and reissue it as a condensed 60-minute version with remixes and overdubs, but the plan was affected by "personality problems". The album was digitally remastered for CD by Joe Gastwirt using the original master tapes, in 1994. It was remastered again by Bill Inglot in 2003 as an "expanded" version on Elektra/Rhino Records, which features a restored two-minute introduction to "The Revealing Science of God" not included on the original LP, but previously released on the 2002 box set In a Word: Yes (1969–). The set includes studio run-throughs of the same track and "The Ancient". The 2003 edition was included in the band's 2013 studio album box set, The Studio Albums 1969–1987.

Tales from Topographic Oceans was reissued with new stereo and 5.1 surround sound mixes by Steven Wilson in October 2016 on the Panegyric label. The four-disc set was available on CD and Blu-ray or DVD-Audio and includes the new mixes, bonus and previously unreleased mixes and tracks, and expanded and restored cover art.

A Super Deluxe Edition box set was released in February 2026, containing 12 CDs, 2 LPs, and one Blu-ray containing a new remaster of the album, additional mixes by Wilson, and previously unreleased live recordings from 1973 and 1974.

== Tour and aftermath ==
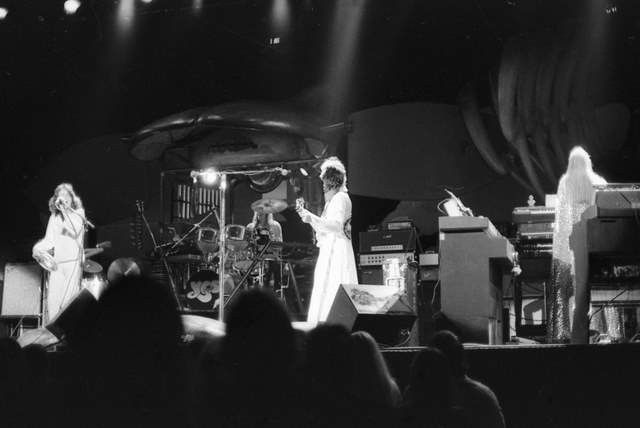
Anderson, White, Squire and Wakeman performing in February 1974

Yes had planned to start touring the album with an American leg from October 1973, but it was cancelled in order to have more time to complete it in the studio. Shortly after its release, Anderson wished the album and tour to be pushed back until January 1974 in order to allocate more time for rehearsals, but half of the available tickets for the opening British tour had quickly sold and the band were unable to cancel. Yes sold out five consecutive nights at the Rainbow Theatre in London, which marked the first time a rock band achieved the feat. They tried to secure two extra shows, but the dates were unavailable; promoter Harvey Goldsmith said the huge demand for tickets for the UK dates was comparable to a Rolling Stones tour. The first Rainbow show was to be filmed by the BBC for broadcast on The Old Grey Whistle Test and to air on radio, but recording did not go ahead. Initial tour rehearsals took place at Manticore.

The 77-date tour visited Europe and North America between November 1973 and April 1974, with a two-hour set of Close to the Edge and Tales from Topographic Oceans performed in their entirety, plus encores. The band toured with no support act. The set was altered as the tour progressed; within a month Lane, Tait, and the road crew had advised Yes to drop "The Ancient" as they thought it was dragging the set, but the group had started to perform it better and kept it in. "The Remembering" was removed completely from March. The North American leg included two sold-out shows at Madison Square Garden in New York City that grossed over $200,000, (equivalent to $1,276,024 in 2024). The band spent £5,000 on a hot air balloon which was decorated with the album's artwork and tethered in each city they performed in the US.

Yes brought four times as much equipment as on their previous tours, which included an elaborate set designed by Dean and his brother Martyn. Two versions of the stage were built; the second, used from the American leg onward, consisted of fibreglass structures, dry ice effects, a drum platform surrounding White, and a tunnel that the band emerged from. During one show, the structure around White that opened and closed failed to operate, leaving him trapped inside. White and Wakeman claimed the incident was the inspiration behind a scene depicted in the rock mockumentary This Is Spinal Tap. Tait spent £10,000 on lighting equipment for the tour, and Offord mixed the band's live sound using a 24-track mixing desk.

No full recording from the tour has been officially released, apart from a performance of "Ritual" from Zürich in April 1974 on the album's 2016 reissue. Yes continued to perform "Ritual" until the end of their 1976 North American tour, after which material from Tales from Topographic Oceans would not be performed for 20 years, when the album's line-up reunited for the Keys to Ascension albums and performed "The Revealing Science of God". From 1997 to 2004 either "The Revealing Science of God" or "Ritual" was performed live, which included the latter performed with an orchestra on stage in 2001. From 2016 to 2018, Yes performed sides one and four as part of their Album Series Tour.

=== Wakeman's departure ===
Following the Rainbow gigs Wakeman called for a band meeting and announced his decision to quit, but the band, Lane, and Carson convinced him to stay for the rest of the tour. His frustration from playing the entire album, and the lack of rehearsal time for the British tour, culminated at a subsequent show in Manchester where his technician brought him a curry which he ate on stage. Roadie Bill Turner recalled Wakeman waving to the audience with a hand puppet and running a wind-up toy dinosaur across the stage when he got bored. Anderson felt he had pushed Wakeman too far, as he was unsatisfied with one of his keyboard solos in the set and had constantly asked him to get it right. Despite the problems, Wakeman said the situation improved as the American leg progressed. When the tour finished, Wakeman declined to attend rehearsals for their next album and confirmed his exit on 18 May 1974, his twenty-fifth birthday; later that day, he found out his solo album, Journey to the Centre of the Earth, had entered the UK chart at number one. Wakeman was replaced by Swiss keyboardist Patrick Moraz. He returned in 1976 for the band's album Going for the One. Regarding Wakeman's disillusionment with Tales, Steve Howe pointed out in his memoir, "One member of the band had trouble with all this material yet went on to make six concept albums himself!"

== Track listing ==
All music is composed by Yes.

Side one
No.	Title	Lyrics	Length
1.	"The Revealing Science of God (Dance of the Dawn)"	Jon Anderson; Steve Howe	20:23 (Note: 22:23 on the 2003 CD reissue.)

Side two
No.	Title	Lyrics	Length
1.	"The Remembering (High the Memory)"	Anderson; Howe; Chris Squire; Rick Wakeman; Alan White	20:33
Total length:			40:56

Side three
No.	Title	Lyrics	Length
1.	"The Ancient (Giants Under the Sun)"	Anderson; Howe; Squire	18:32

Side four
No.	Title	Lyrics	Length
1.	"Ritual (Nous Sommes du Soleil)"	Anderson; Howe	21:31
Total length:			40:03

Bonus tracks (2003 Remaster, Disc two)
No.	Title	Lyrics	Length
2.	"Dance of the Dawn" (Studio Run-through)	Anderson; Howe	23:35
3.	"Giants Under the Sun" (Studio Run-through)	Anderson; Howe; Squire	17:17
Total length:			40:52

== Personnel ==
Yes

- Jon Anderson – lead vocals, percussion
- Steve Howe – guitars, electric sitar, lute, backing vocals
- Chris Squire – bass guitar, backing vocals
- Rick Wakeman – keyboards
- Alan White – drums, percussion

Technical

- Yes – producer
- Eddie Offord – producer
- Guy Bidmead – tapes
- Roger Dean – cover design and illustration
- Mansell Litho – plates

== Charts ==
Chart (1973–74)	Peak position
Australian Albums (Kent Music Report)	13
Canada Top Albums/CDs (RPM)	4
Dutch Albums (Album Top 100)	8
Finnish Albums (Finnish Albums Chart)	27
German Albums (Offizielle Top 100)	26
Italian Albums (Musica e Dischi)	16
Japanese Albums (Oricon)	8
Norwegian Albums (VG-lista)	8
UK Albums (Official Charts)	1
US Billboard 200	6

Chart (2016–17)	Peak position
Scottish Albums (Official Charts)	60
UK Independent Albums (Official Charts)	18
UK Rock & Metal Albums (Official Charts)	6
UK Progressive Albums (Official Charts)	24

Chart (2026)	Peak position
Belgian Albums (Ultratop Flanders)	104

== Certifications ==
Region	Certification	Certified units/sales
Switzerland (IFPI Switzerland)	Gold	25,000^{^}
United Kingdom (BPI)	Gold	100,000^{^}
United States (RIAA)	Gold	500,000^{^}
^{^} Shipments figures based on certification alone.
