= Yessongs =

1973 live album by Yes

Live album by Yes
- Released: 4 May 1973
- Recorded: February–December 1972
- Venues: Various locations in the US and Canada and the Rainbow Theatre, London
- Genre: Progressive rock
- Length: 129:16
- Label: Atlantic
- Producers: Yes; Eddie Offord

Yes chronology
| Close to the Edge (1972) | Yessongs (1973) | Tales from Topographic Oceans (1973) |

Yessongs is the first live album by the English progressive rock band Yes, released on 4 May 1973 in the US and 18 May 1973 in the UK by Atlantic Records. The triple vinyl set compiles live performances recorded in 1972 during the band's tours for their breakthrough studio albums, Fragile (1971) and Close to the Edge (1972). The album captures a pivotal transition period for the band's lineup. Original drummer Bill Bruford appears on three tracks recorded in early 1972 before his departure to join King Crimson. The remainder of the album features his replacement, Alan White, who learned the band's complex repertoire in just three days prior to touring Close to the Edge. The album was mixed and edited by the band and producer Eddy Offord, and features elaborate packaging designed by artist Roger Dean, featuring a multi-gatefold sleeve that tells a visual narrative across four distinct, surreal landscapes.

Upon release, Yessongs was a major commercial success; though music critics heavily caveated their reviews due to its poor audio fidelity, they widely praised the band's raw energy and technical precision. The album peaked at No. 7 in the UK and No. 12 in the US, achieving platinum certification in 1998, making it one of the group's highest-selling records. The album's commercial and critical triumphs were further consolidated by a 1975 concert film of the same name, which documents the band's performances at London's Rainbow Theatre. In 2015, recordings of seven concerts from late 1972, including ones that were used on Yessongs, were released in their entirety as Progeny: Seven Shows from Seventy-Two.

== Background and recording ==
In September 1971, the Yes line-up of singer Jon Anderson, bassist Chris Squire, drummer Bill Bruford, guitarist Steve Howe, and newcomer keyboardist Rick Wakeman embarked on their Fragile Tour in support of the band's fourth studio album, Fragile (1971). The tour saw the band play across the United Kingdom, the United States, and Europe until March 1972. Following the recording of their fifth studio album, Close to the Edge (1972), the band resumed as a live act on 30 July 1972 to support the album. The tour saw the debut of drummer Alan White in the band after Bruford left when recording for the album had finished. His departure came eleven days prior to the tour's start, leaving White to learn the band's repertoire in three days. The tour ended in April 1973, by which time Yes had made additional live recordings. Yes manager Brian Lane said that people had started to think that the group were a "studio band" and were unable to reproduce what they recorded in the studio on stage, which became a reason for putting out a live album.

The Fragile and Close to the Edge tours had producer and engineer Eddy Offord travelling with the band as their live sound mixer who operated a sound system developed by the Clair Brothers. In addition, co-founder Roy Clair assisted with the operation of the system, and Geoff Haslam was hired as the recording engineer alongside assistant Mike Dunn to work on Yessongs. As Offord was in charge of the band's sound on stage, he could not operate the recording equipment at the same time. This resulted in recordings that he was disappointed with as they were substandard. When it was time for the album to be edited and remixed, Offord and the band retreated to studio 2 at Advision Studios in Fitzrovia, London to complete it. Howe recalled the group treated the mixing process with as much care and importance as one of their studio albums with careful consideration to the preparation of the various edits and the finished product.

== Songs ==
Yessongs begins with "Opening (Excerpt from 'Firebird Suite')", the closing section to the orchestral work The Firebird by Russian composer Igor Stravinsky. Yes have used the piece as the introductory music to most of their concerts since 1971, the year of the composer's death. The performance of the Suite heard on Yessongs is by the Boston Symphony Orchestra, conducted by Seiji Ozawa, first released in 1970 (RCA Red Seal – LSB 4009), using Stravinsky's 1919 re-orchestration. The track segues into "Siberian Khatru" from Close to the Edge.

"Perpetual Change" and "Long Distance Runaround"/"The Fish (Schindleria Praematurus)" were recorded during the Fragile Tour with Bruford on drums, and feature extended solos from Howe, Bruford and Squire compared to the studio versions. "Excerpts from 'The Six Wives of Henry VIII'" is a keyboard solo spot of excerpts from Wakeman's first solo album The Six Wives of Henry VIII (1973), which he recorded during the Fragile and Close to the Edge tours and features Howe, Squire, Bruford, and White. The solo is preceded by Anderson singing notes from the opening of another Stravinsky orchestral piece, The Rite of Spring.

== Artwork ==
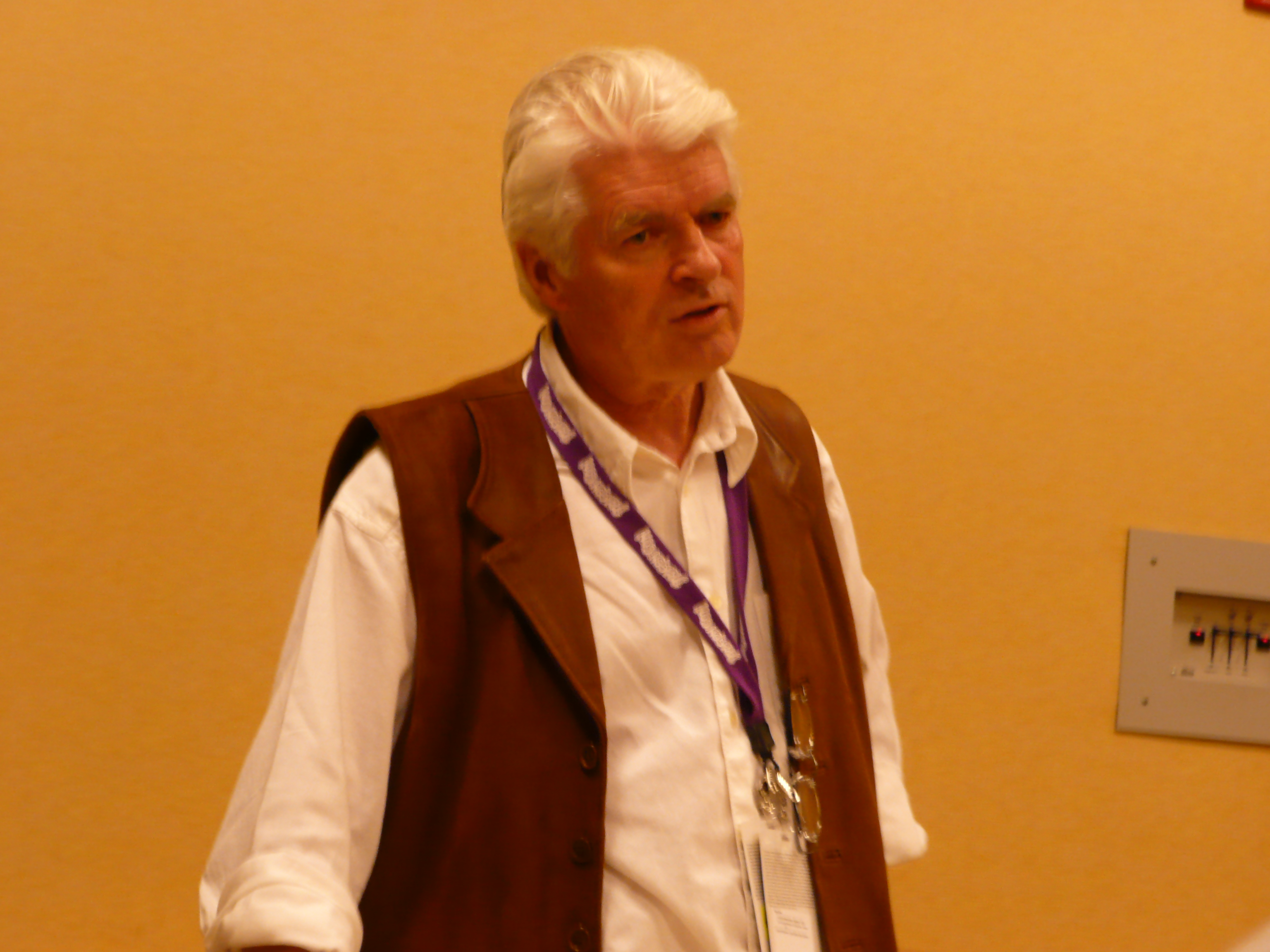
Roger Dean's artwork for Yessongs was the most elaborate at the time

The album was originally presented in a gatefold sleeve with artwork designed and illustrated by the band's longtime associate, artist Roger Dean. His brother Martyn was responsible for its layout and additional photography, featuring shots of each member performing in concert. Dean described the album as "the most elaborate and complex package" of his career at the time, which consisted of three albums worth of artwork and a booklet. The large space for Dean's work allowed him to continue a theme that "implied a story" that he introduced on the cover of Fragile, which portrays a planet breaking into pieces and a spacecraft in flight. The narrative was continued on the sleeve of Close to the Edge. Dean recalled that talks about the artwork for Yessongs were scarce until he presented the group with a rough version of his "Pathways" painting, which was well received and influenced his decision to continue the narrative. However, Dean had to redesign a new broken planet to the one on Fragile as the pieces of land that break off were too square shaped, so the pieces seen on Yessongs are more triangular. The gatefold design involved complex paper folding that Dean described as "a way of going from gatefold to any number of pages, folded out of one piece of card", and resulted in Dean and his printers, Tinsley Robor, filing a patent for that way of folding. Further development of the technique was cut short due to a subsequent national paper shortage.

The first painting, named "Escape", shows the spacecraft and a planetary fragment drifting through space in the search for a new world, with several other fragments following behind. "Arrival" depicts these fragments landing in the waters of the new world, with "Awakening" showing signs of new life starting, including plant and animal species. The final image, "Pathways", depicts the emergence of civilisation with a city in the background. The version with the girl sitting on top of the pathway structure was not in the original, and was painted separately and added later at the printing stage. While Dean was working on "Pathways", his cat walked across the canvas whilst still wet and its paw prints can be seen in the sky area. Dean attempted to disguise them as clouds, but it failed to produce the desired results and he kept them in. After it was photographed for the sleeve, Dean's cat urinated on the painting as it was standing against a wall, causing Dean to paint a new version that he said "looked quite different" to the version photographed.

In June 2013, Dean filed a $50 million lawsuit against director James Cameron for copyright and contributory infringement and unjust enrichment, claiming the design of Pandora, a fictional setting in Cameron's epic science fiction film Avatar (2009) and the highest-grossing film at the time, was based on Dean's paintings including "Pathways" and used without permission. The lawsuit was thrown out by judge Jesse M. Furman in September 2014 who disagreed and believed the court found no substantial similarities between the film and Dean's artwork.

== Release ==
Professional ratings
Review scores
| Source | Rating |
|---|---|
| AllMusic | 4/5 stars |
| Rolling Stone | (not rated) |
| The Rolling Stone Album Guide | 2/5 stars |

Yessongs was released in May 1973. its release was originally planned for February 1973, prior to the start of the band's early 1973 North American tour, but delays in printing its cover led to its release pushed back. The band and Lane agreed to take a cut in royalties generated from the album so it could be sold at a lower price.

It peaked at number 7 on the UK Albums Chart and number 12 on the US Billboard 200. On 2 June 1973, the American magazine Cash Box reported that the album had reached gold certification by the Recording Industry Association of America (RIAA) for selling 500,000 copies in the US. In 1998, the album was certified platinum for shipping one million copies, becoming one of the band's highest selling records.

In an overall positive review for The Los Angeles Times, Richard Cromelin said that although some of the live renditions are sub-par to their studio versions, it presented some "excellent and rarely-heard pieces" that make the listener "really feel the people behind the music" which in turn makes up for the "occasional sloppiness". Cromelin praised the album for the "stunning improvisations" and interplay within the band which dispels those who criticise Yes for being "dry and mechanical". Record World highlighted the album's "remarkable sound quality" and believed that the collection showcased the band "at their exciting creative best." Variety published a positive review, noting the album shows the band at "their exciting best". Band biographer Tim Morse thought the album's downfall was its substandard audio quality despite the band's strong performances.

== Reissues ==
Yessongs has been reissued several times:

- 1987 – 2-disc CD reissue on Atlantic Records
- 1994 – 2-disc CD remaster by Joe Gastwirt on Atlantic Records
- 1998 & 2001 – 3-disc HDCD reissue by Isao Kikuchi on Warner Music Japan
- 2009 – 2-disc SHM-CD remaster by Isao Kikuchi on Warner Music Japan
- 2013 – 2-disc SACD reissue as part of the High Vibration – SACD Box set on Rhino Records

== Track listing ==
Note: The liner notes do not list recording dates or locations, but audio comparisons of the album and the live box set Progeny: Seven Shows from Seventy-Two (2015) can be made, in addition to the soundtrack to the Yessongs concert film.

Side one (CD 1)
| No. | Title | Writer(s) | Recording date and location | Length |
|---|---|---|---|---|
| 1. | "Opening (Excerpt from 'Firebird Suite')" | Igor Stravinsky | 20 November 1972 at Nassau Coliseum in Uniondale, New York | 3:45 |
| 2. | "Siberian Khatru" | Jon Anderson, Steve Howe, Rick Wakeman | 15 November 1972 at Knoxville Civic Coliseum in Knoxville, Tennessee | 8:50 |
| 3. | "Heart of the Sunrise" | Anderson, Bill Bruford, Chris Squire | 12 November 1972 at Greensboro Coliseum in Greensboro, North Carolina | 11:26 |

Side two (CD 1)
| No. | Title | Writer(s) | Recording date and location | Length |
|---|---|---|---|---|
| 1. | "Perpetual Change" | Anderson, Squire | 19 and/or 23 February 1972 at the Academy of Music in New York City, New York | 14:08 |
| 2. | "And You and I"; I. "Cord of Life"; II. "Eclipse"; III. "The Preacher the Teacher"; IV. "The Apocalypse" | Anderson, Bruford, Howe, Squire | 15 and/or 16 December 1972 at the Rainbow Theatre in Finsbury Park, London | 9:34 |

Side three (CD 1)
| No. | Title | Writer(s) | Recording date and location | Length |
|---|---|---|---|---|
| 1. | "Mood for a Day" | Howe | 20 November 1972 | 2:52 |
| 2. | "Excerpts from 'The Six Wives of Henry VIII'" | Wakeman | 15 November 1972 (first third) and 20 November 1972 (final two thirds) | 6:35 |
| 3. | "Roundabout" | Anderson, Howe | 1 November 1972 at Ottawa Civic Centre in Ottawa, Ontario | 8:33 |

Side four (CD 2)
| No. | Title | Writer(s) | Recording date and location | Length |
|---|---|---|---|---|
| 1. | "I've Seen All Good People" a. "Your Move" b. "All Good People" | Anderson, Squire | 12 November 1972 (second half) | 7:09 |
| 2. | "Long Distance Runaround"/"The Fish (Schindleria Praematurus)" | Anderson, Squire | 19 and/or 23 February 1972 | 13:37 |

Side five (CD 2)
| No. | Title | Writer(s) | Recording date and location | Length |
|---|---|---|---|---|
| 1. | "Close to the Edge"; I. "The Solid Time of Change"; II. "Total Mass Retain"; III. "I Get Up, I Get Down"; IV. "Seasons of Man" | Anderson, Howe | 15 and/or 16 December 1972 | 18:41 |

Side six (CD 2)
| No. | Title | Writer(s) | Recording date and location | Length |
|---|---|---|---|---|
| 1. | "Yours Is No Disgrace" | Anderson, Squire, Howe, Bruford, Tony Kaye | 15 November 1972 | 14:21 |
| 2. | "Starship Trooper" a. "Life Seeker" b. "Disillusion" c. "Würm" | Anderson, Howe, Squire | 15 and/or 16 December 1972 | 9:25 |

== Personnel ==
Credits are adapted from the album's 1973 and 1994 liner notes.

Yes

- Jon Anderson – lead vocals
- Chris Squire – bass guitar, backing vocals
- Steve Howe – electric and acoustic guitars, backing vocals
- Rick Wakeman – keyboards
- Bill Bruford – drums on "Perpetual Change" and "Long Distance Runaround"/"The Fish (Schindleria Praematurus)"
- Alan White – drums on all other tracks

Production

- Yes – production
- Eddie Offord – production
- Geoff Haslam – recording engineer
- Mike Dunn – assistant engineer
- Roger Dean – cover design and illustration
- Martin Dean – photographs and layout
- David "Groucho" Gair – additional photographs
- Brian Lane – co-ordination

== Charts ==
| Chart (1973–74) | Peak position |
|---|---|
| Australian Albums (Kent Music Report) | 8 |
| Canada Top Albums/CDs (RPM) | 8 |
| German Albums (Offizielle Top 100) | 28 |
| Italian Albums (Musica e Dischi) | 9 |
| Japanese Albums (Oricon) | 17 |
| UK Albums (Official Charts) | 7 |
| US Billboard 200 | 12 |

== Certifications ==
| Region | Certification | Certified units/sales |
|---|---|---|
| Canada (Music Canada) | Gold | 50,000^{^} |
| Germany (BVMI) | Gold | 250,000^{^} |
| Switzerland (IFPI Switzerland) | Gold | 25,000^{^} |
| United States (RIAA) | Platinum | 1,000,000^{^} |
^{^} Shipments figures based on certification alone.
