= Solaris Center, Estonia =

Shopping and cultural centre in Tallinn

Coordinates: 59°26′N 24°45′E

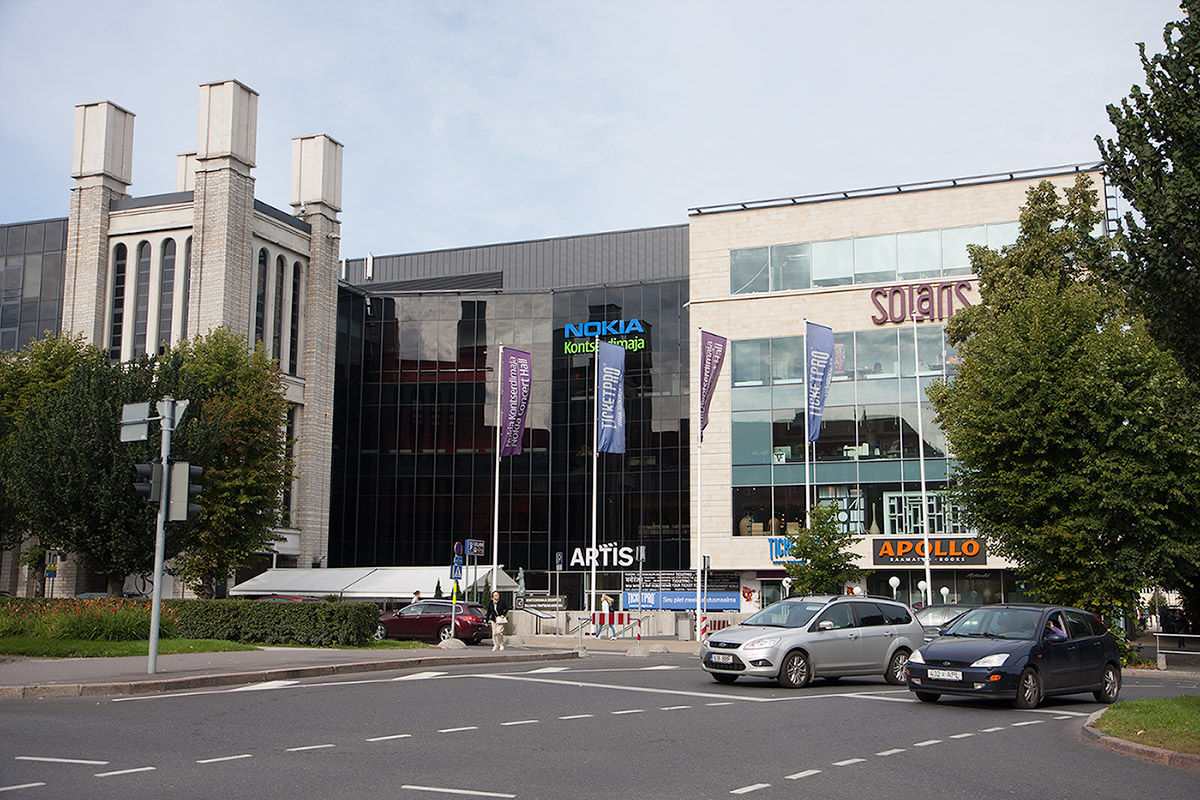
Solaris Centre in 2012

Solaris Center (Estonian: Solarise Keskus) is a shopping and entertainment complex in Tallinn, Estonia. It is the largest entertainment, trade and cultural center in Tallinn. The center was projected by Raivo Puusepp. It was opened in March 2009 (16 years ago). The net area of the center is 6,235 m^{2} (67,110 sq ft).

In the center, there is located 1800-place Nokia Concert Hall(until may 2014). Nordea Concert Hall(until 2018) & now Alexela Concert Hall, also Cinamon Cinema Centre(until 2010) Solaris Cinema(until 2015) & now Apollo Cinema Solaris and Artis Art House is located there.
