= Alexela Concert Hall =

Concert hall in Tallinn, Estonia

Coordinates: 59.43301137163462°N 24.752075198416282°E

Alexela Concert Hall (Estonian: Alexela kontserdimaja; until 12 April 2018: Nordea Concert Hall (Estonian: Nordea kontserdimaja), until 15 May 2014: Nokia Concert Hall (Estonian: Nokia kontserdimaja)) is a concert hall in Tallinn, Estonia. The hall is located adjacent to Solaris Center. The hall's owner is Tallinna Kontserdimaja AS.

The hall was constructed from 2007 to 2009.

The hall consists of 1,829 seats as follows: 1,030 in the arena, 491 in the dress circle and 308 in the upper circle.

Several international events have been taken place there: e.g. 23rd European Film Awards in 2010.
