= Siberian Khatru =

Song by Yes

from the album Close to the Edge
- Released: 8 September 1972
- Genre: Progressive rock; funk rock
- Length: 8:56
- Label: Atlantic
- Composers: Jon Anderson; Steve Howe; Rick Wakeman
- Lyricist: Jon Anderson
- Producers: Yes; Eddie Offord

Close to the Edge track listing
- 3 tracks Side one: 1. "Close to the Edge"; Side two: 1. "And You and I"; 2. "Siberian Khatru"

"Siberian Khatru" (/saɪˈbɪəriən xæˈtruː/) is the third song on the album Close to the Edge by English progressive rock band Yes. Live versions of the song are included on the albums Yessongs, Keys to Ascension, Live at Montreux 2003 and In the Present – Live from Lyon. Several performances of the song are included on the 2015 boxed-set Progeny: Seven Shows from Seventy-Two, which features seven complete consecutive concerts recorded on the band's late 1972 North American tour.

== Lyrics and music ==
According to an interview with Yes vocalist Jon Anderson, "Khatru means 'as you wish' in the Yemeni dialect of Arabic. When we were working on it, I kept singing the word over and over again, even though I had no idea what it meant. I asked somebody to look it up for me, and when they told me the meaning, it worked for the song." The lyrics discuss "unity among different cultures."

The band often used it as an opening number at concerts. "It has everything: riffs, themes, bridges and an unusual middle eight, big Stravinsky-like orchestral stabs", guitarist Steve Howe later wrote. He played two solos: one after Rick Wakeman's harpsichord solo in the middle on a Gibson BR-9 steel guitar he had just bought. The other, at the end, Howe purposely played without being able to hear what it sounded like, as an experiment. When the band listened to the playback, "we thought it was weird but suitably interesting." Howe has changed it on subsequent tours. "It became my most rejuvenated solo," he wrote in 2021, "as I've enjoyed exploring the infinite possibilities over the thematic two 5/4 bar structure."

Howe considered the song to be one of Yes' more collaborative compositions, stating "That song came together with the arranging skills of the band. Jon had the rough idea of the song, and Chris [Squire], Bill [Bruford], Rick and me would collaborate on getting the riffs together.”

== Reception ==
Paul Stump, in his 1997 History of Progressive Rock, described the song as "a modal monster, chilled by [Rick] Wakeman's terrifying Mellotron strings, charging on in irregular tempo to a series of climactic barbarian chants interspersed with lightning twelve-string soloing from [Steve] Howe."

Ultimate Classic Rock critic Ryan Reed described the song as being Yes' 7th heaviest song saying that the opening guitar riff is "hostile enough to pierce through your speakers and slash your eardrums" and that the rest of the song "mostly maintains that momentum." Reed also praises the "vocal harmonies that reach choral complexity, Rick Wakeman’s left-field harpsichord, Howe’s electric sitar cameo," and Chris Squire's bass guitar playing that Reed describes as being "somewhere between funk and metal."

== Legacy ==
John Frusciante, the guitarist of Red Hot Chili Peppers, has cited the guitar solo at the end as an influence for his own guitar solo on the 1999 Red Hot Chili Peppers song "Get on Top": "I was thinking about Steve Howe's solo at the end of Yes' 'Siberian Khatru'. The band sound is really big — and they're playing fast — and then this clean guitar comes out over the top. It's really beautiful, like it's on its own sort of shelf. For 'Get on Top', I wanted to play something that would create a contrast between the solo and the background."

In the 2004 sitcom Catterick, written by and starring Reeves and Mortimer, the name of the fictional pub is The Siberian Khatru.

== Personnel ==
- Jon Anderson – lead vocals
- Steve Howe – electric guitar, acoustic guitar, backing vocals
- Chris Squire – bass guitar, backing vocals
- Rick Wakeman – Hammond organ, RMI 368 Electra-piano, Harpsichord, Mellotron, Minimoog
- Bill Bruford – drums, percussion
