= Close to the Edge =

1972 studio album by Yes

Studio album by Yes
- Released: 8 September 1972
- Recorded: April–June 1972
- Studios: Advision, London
- Genre: Progressive rock
- Length: 37:51
- Label: Atlantic
- Producers: Yes; Eddie Offord

Yes chronology
Fragile (1971)	Close to the Edge (1972)	Yessongs (1973)

Singles from Close to the Edge
- 1. "And You and I (Part I) / (Part II)" Released: 13 October 1972 (US)

Alternative cover
- Cover of the 2018 reissue of the Steven Wilson remix

Close to the Edge is the fifth studio album by the English progressive rock band Yes, released in the UK on 8 September 1972 and in the United States on 13 September 1972 by Atlantic Records. Comprising just three extensive tracks, the record represents a peak in the group's 1970s progressive era. It is their final album until Union (1991) to feature original drummer Bill Bruford, who found the painstaking recording sessions intensely laborious—influencing his decision to leave Yes to join King Crimson prior to the album's release.

Following the commercial success and promotional tour for their previous album Fragile (1971), Yes regrouped with producer and engineer Eddy Offord at Advision Studios in London to record a follow-up. Anderson and Howe compiled various musical sketches written on tour, which were meticulously assembled in the studio through a democratic, section-by-section arrangement process. The album's centrepiece is the 18-minute title track, an ambitious four-movement suite with lyrical themes inspired by the Hermann Hesse novel Siddhartha. Side two features two contrasting pieces: the pastoral, folk-infused "And You and I" and the hard-driving rocker "Siberian Khatru". The musical arrangements prominently integrated Rick Wakeman's virtuosic use of the Mellotron and church organ, expanding the band's sonic palette. The minimalist green sleeve art, designed by Roger Dean and inspired by the tarns of Haystacks, marked the historic debut of the band's iconic "bubble" logotype.

Upon release, Close to the Edge became the band's greatest commercial success to date, reaching No. 4 on the UK Albums Chart and No. 3 on the US Billboard 200, where it maintained a chart residency of over thirty weeks and eventually earned a platinum certification from the Recording Industry Association of America (RIAA) for selling over one million copies. Yes supported the record with the 1972–1973 world tour comprising over 90 dates, which marked the debut of replacement drummer Alan White. The record has been reissued multiple times, including expanded editions in 2003 and 2013 featuring new stereo and 5.1 surround sound mixes, and a comprehensive multi-disc Super Deluxe Edition box set in 2025 featuring a Dolby Atmos mix. Close to the Edge has since received widespread critical acclaim as a progressive rock masterwork, consistently appearing on Rolling Stone's list of the "500 Greatest Albums of All Time".

== Background ==
In March 1972, the group's active line-up of lead vocalist Jon Anderson, bassist Chris Squire, drummer Bill Bruford, guitarist Steve Howe, and keyboardist Rick Wakeman wrapped their six-month Fragile Tour in support of their fourth album, Fragile (1971). The album had become their greatest commercial and critical success since their formation, becoming a top-ten hit in the UK and the US, propelled by the track "Roundabout" receiving considerable airplay on American radio. On 1 and 2 February 1972, during one of the tour's rest periods, the band booked time at Advision Studios in London to lay down initial material for a follow-up record. When touring finished, they took a brief hiatus before entering rehearsals in the basement of the Una Billings School of Dance in Shepherd's Bush in May 1972. Although Anderson and Howe had compiled various musical fragments and sketches in hotel rooms during the tour, none of the tracks were fully written at this stage. This required the group to assemble the pre-existing motifs in the studio and learn to play them through afterwards. On several occasions, the arrangements that Yes had started to piece together grew so complex that they were forgotten by the time the next day's session began, prompting the band to record each rehearsal for future reference. Bruford devised the album's title to reflect the stressful and precarious state of the band at the time.

== Recording and production ==
By June 1972, Yes had arranged the material for the album and returned to Advision Studios to begin tracking. Eddie Offord, who had worked with the band since Time and a Word (1970) and had mixed their live audio on the Fragile tour, assumed his role as engineer and co-producer, sharing production duties with the group. Having managed their live sound, Offord wished to recreate the intense energy the musicians generated during their best concert performances. To achieve this, he instructed the road crew to construct a large wooden stage in the studio for the band to perform on; he noted that Bruford's drums resonated beautifully with the platform, making the group sound "more live". The facility also housed a small booth constructed of wooden boards in which Howe performed to isolate and enhance his guitar tones. In one incident, the musicians decided to use a specific take for a track, only to realise that the studio's cleaning staff had thrown the tape away. A frantic search through the dustbins outside the studio ensued, and the missing piece was successfully recovered and spliced into the master tape. Around halfway through the sessions, Anderson decided to walk home from the studio after an exhausting night that ended at dawn. He broke down in tears upon arriving, concluding that he could "officially call myself a musician now"—subsequently writing it in the previously blank occupation section of his passport.

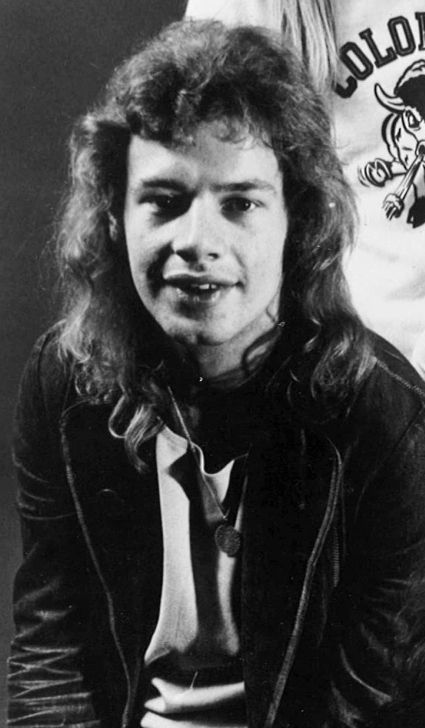
Bill Bruford found the painstaking studio sessions intensely laborious, describing the democratic writing process as "unbelievably hard work".

During their month at Advision, Melody Maker reporter Chris Welch visited the studio to observe the group at work. Welch described a stressful atmosphere, coupled with "outbursts of anarchy" from Bruford, Howe, and Wakeman, alongside intense debates over every completed mix. Welch sensed that the band were not operating as a cohesive unit, noting that Anderson and Howe were the only members who knew what direction the album was to take, leaving the others to add fragments to a "vast jigsaw of sound" that Squire and Offord then helped shape. In Welch's view, Wakeman and Bruford remained "innocent bystanders" in the creative decision-making. Howe later disputed Welch's description, suggesting the report was heavily influenced by Bruford's frustrations at the time. Howe clarified that the primary source of tension was between Squire and Bruford, particularly when Squire requested that Bruford alter his drumming patterns to better accommodate complex basslines. In another instance, Welch arrived at the studio to preview a completed passage that had required several days of round-the-clock editing. Upon entering, he heard a dull thud and discovered that Offord had fallen asleep on top of the mixing console from pure exhaustion, leaving the music from the spinning tape deck blaring at an intolerable volume.

Bruford found the creation of Close to the Edge exceptionally difficult, describing the process as torturous and akin to "climbing Mount Everest". He grew frustrated with the band's major-key, diatonic musical direction, preferring more jazz-oriented, improvisational structures. This ideological divide clashed with the group's democratic writing methodology, where every short section of a track was meticulously played through, debated, and voted upon. Bruford later reflected: "Every instrument was up for democratic election, and everybody had to run an election campaign on every issue. It was horrible, it was incredibly unpleasant, and unbelievably hard work". Squire's working methods became a growing source of discontent for Bruford, who grew tired of the bassist's chronic lateness. On one occasion, Bruford fell asleep on a sofa in the control room while Squire was adjusting two dials on the mixing desk to equalise his bass tracks; waking up several hours later, Bruford found Squire "in the same place, still considering the relative position of the two knobs". Although Bruford remained grateful to Anderson for encouraging him to write, he felt he had reached his creative peak with the band upon the album's completion, concluding that he could offer no better arrangements to the group and needed "a breath of fresh air".

== Composition and music ==
=== "Close to the Edge" ===
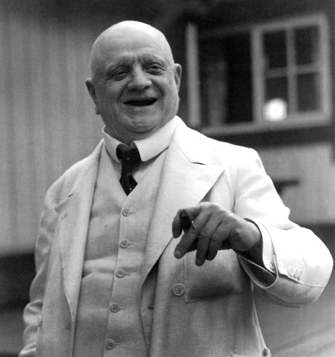
Finnish composer Jean Sibelius, whose single-movement Seventh Symphony heavily influenced the structure of the title track.

"Close to the Edge" was written by Anderson and Howe, both of whom also share lyrical credits. Comprising four distinct, interconnected movements—"The Solid Time of Change", "Total Mass Retain", "I Get Up, I Get Down", and "Seasons of Man"—its 18-minute runtime marked the longest track Yes had recorded to date. Anderson gained initial inspiration in his hotel room during the Fragile tour while reading The Lord of the Rings by J. R. R. Tolkien and listening to Symphony Nos. 6 and 7 by Jean Sibelius, one of his favourite composers. The Seventh Symphony struck Anderson particularly, as he noticed its main theme was introduced deep into the composition, which influenced how "Close to the Edge" was structured. He studied the piece for the remainder of the tour, discussing his initial ideas with Howe roughly halfway through the dates. During a tour break, the two resumed writing at Howe's home in Hampstead, north London, at which point Howe devised the lyric "Close to the edge, round by the corner", inspired by his time living in Battersea, an area alongside the River Thames. Anderson based the song's themes and lyrics on the novel Siddhartha (1922) by German author Hermann Hesse, and revised the lines three or four times, noting that "it's all metaphors". The lyrics for the concluding verse were based on a dream Anderson had regarding the "passing on from this world to another... yet feeling so fantastic about it that death never frightened me ever since".

The song's tape loop introduction, a combination of keyboard textures and localised environmental recordings including flowing water and bird chirps, measured approximately 40 feet (12 m) in length and took two days to assemble. Anderson was inspired to include the environmental ambiance and the specific instrumentation in the "I Get Up, I Get Down" section after listening to Sonic Seasonings (1972), an electronic ambient album by Wendy Carlos. Anderson suggested opening with an improvised group jam, which the musicians viewed as adventurous and explains why the band enter abruptly on the final take. The track was assembled in pieces throughout, as Bruford described, "in ten, twelve, sixteen-bar sections". The aggressive introduction came about after Yes had toured with the fusion group Mahavishnu Orchestra, prompting a band suggestion to open the piece with a collective improvisation punctuated by pre-arranged pauses.

The music played during the "Close to the edge, round by the corner" refrain was originally an unreleased, same-titled song Howe had written several years prior, partially themed around the summer solstice. Anderson and Howe agreed this fragment integrated seamlessly with an Anderson composition titled "Total Mass Retain", thereby fusing the two ideas. Howe had prepared another separate piece whose middle eight was adapted into the "In her white lace" section of "I Get Up, I Get Down". Wakeman's organ solo was originally written by Howe for the guitar, but the band concluded the arrangement sounded more powerful on keyboards. It was performed on the pipe organ at the St Giles-without-Cripplegate church in the Barbican, London. The band produced a take of the section following the church organ solo with which they were highly satisfied; however, during the final mixing process, Offord accidentally misplaced the correct take and spliced an inferior take into the master while tossing the preferred performance into the tape scraps bin. The mistake caused a noticeable tape edit on the heavy downbeat where the full band abruptly crashes back in following the organ climax. The defect had to remain in the final cut, as reproducing the exact acoustics would have been nearly impossible. On the studio recording, Anderson sings the final verses in F major, which had to be transposed down to E-flat major during live performances to mitigate vocal strain.

=== "And You and I" ===
"And You and I" originated as a folk-oriented piece developed by Anderson, structured around the concept of establishing a central theme and expanding it dynamically as the track progresses. The composition is divided into four distinct, interconnected movements: "Cord of Life", "Eclipse", "The Preacher, the Teacher", and "Apocalypse". Its overall arrangements and thematic motifs were shaped collectively by Howe, Bruford, and Squire, making it the only track on the album to credit Bruford and Squire as co-writers. Anderson initially pitched his ideas for the composition while strumming acoustic chords, singing the melodic lines of the opening verse, a motif Howe particularly admired and was eager to expand upon. While introducing the song during their live tours, Anderson revealed that its working title had been "The Protest Song". In its formative stage, the track featured an extended ending that Welch described as "a shattering climax", but its popularity among the musicians waned over time, prompting their decision to excise it from the final version.

In an August 1972 newspaper review of a Yes concert, the writer noted that Anderson described the song as a tale concerning "the search for truth and purity between two people". Anderson himself likened the track to a hymn, evoking a sense of feeling "secure in the knowledge of knowing there is somebody... God maybe". The track opens with Howe performing on a Guild twelve-string acoustic guitar belonging to Squire. Prior to the song's official start, Howe improvised string harmonics and spoke the word "Okay" in response to Offord, who had signalled through the headphones that the tape was rolling. The studio chatter was accidental, but Offord admired the intimate atmosphere it created and successfully persuaded the band to preserve it in the master mix. "The Preacher, the Teacher" was fully fleshed out in a single afternoon. Anderson suggested injecting a country-tinged swing feel, prompting Howe and Squire to devise interlocking guitar and bass arrangements that Anderson recalled "sat together so sweet", which culminated in a prominent, driving Minimoog synthesizer solo by Wakeman.

=== "Siberian Khatru" ===
"Siberian Khatru" is a more traditional, driving rock track that grew from a chord structure Anderson had conceived on acoustic guitar. Because he had not worked out a full arrangement, the rest of the group developed the parts that required structural completion, debating and refining riffs since the song initially lacked a central motif strong enough to carry the rhythm. Wakeman received a co-writing credit on the composition, which features his prominent solo played on a custom Thomas Goff harpsichord. Wakeman recalled Goff visiting the studio personally to instruct Offord on the acoustic characteristics and ideal microphone placement for the instrument. The track's arrangements are notable for Howe's eclectic instrumentation, prominently incorporating a sitar and pedal steel guitar alongside traditional electric guitar leads. Regarding the lyrics, Anderson noted that the track consists of an accumulation of "interesting words, though it does relate to the dreams of clear summer days", accompanied by rapid, rhythmic scat-vocal harmonies between Anderson, Squire, and Howe. He claimed that "khatru" translates to "as you wish" in the Yemeni dialect of Arabic, though he admitted he was unaware of its linguistic meaning until he requested someone to research the word for him. Howe stated that the group were heavily inspired by the avant-garde structures of Igor Stravinsky for the song's coda, utilising "staccato pounding" while superimposing sharp accents on the vocals and drums across a cyclic, driving guitar motif. To record Howe's final outro guitar solo, Offord attempted a sonic experiment by positioning a fixed microphone next to the amplifier while instructing his assistant to physically swing a second microphone around the live room to simulate a panning Doppler effect.

== Artwork ==
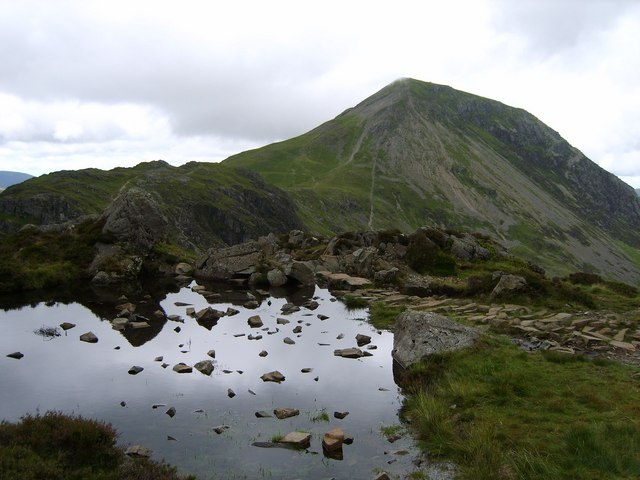
A tarn on Haystacks, which inspired Roger Dean's surreal landscape paintings for the inner sleeve artwork.

Close to the Edge was packaged in a gatefold sleeve designed and illustrated by Roger Dean, who had previously created the artwork for Fragile (1971). The release marked the historic debut of the band's iconic "bubble" logotype, positioned atop a minimalist front cover featuring a linear colour gradient transitioning from black to vibrant green. Dean conceived the logo without the musicians' prior knowledge and before Yes had even commenced work on the album. He sketched the design onboard the Brighton Belle from London to Brighton, operating on the idea that the three letters could be interconnected "in an interesting way", completing the draft by the time the train arrived at his destination. Dean initially proposed having the album title silver-blocked to mimic the spine of a traditional book, though the idea never materialised. His final typography design has since been described by music critics as a "calligraphed colophon".

In his original concept, Dean intended for the packaging to replicate the tactile quality of a gold-embossed, leather-bound book, drawing inspiration from his personal collection of leather sketchbooks. He found visual inspiration for the internal landscape paintings during a excursion to Haystacks, a fell in the Lake District. After taking a photograph from its summit and observing the numerous tarns below, Dean recalled: "I was imagining this lake as something grander [...] How could it sustain itself on the tippy top of a mountain?" The inner sleeve features individual portrait photographs of the group members and Offord, captured by Dean and Martyn Adelman, the latter of whom had played alongside Squire in the 1960s as a member of the beat group the Syn. Dean also drafted the inner sleeve text and lyric sheets entirely by hand. Reflecting on the final design, he noted: "There were a couple of ideas that merged there. It was of a waterfall constantly refreshing itself, pouring from all sides of the lake, but where was the water coming from? I was looking for an image to portray that".

== Release ==
Close to the Edge was released in the United Kingdom on 8 September 1972 and in the United States on 13 September 1972, six weeks into the band's 1972–1973 world tour. The album became their greatest commercial success since their formation, peaking at number four on the UK Albums Chart and reaching number three on the US Billboard 200, where it maintained a chart residency of over thirty weeks. In the Netherlands, the album topped the charts at number one. The record received 450,000 advanced pre-orders in the United States. On 30 October 1972, the album was certified gold by the Recording Industry Association of America (RIAA) for shipping 500,000 copies in the United States. Atlantic Records owner Ahmet Ertegun presented the group with their gold disc awards at a New York City restaurant on 20 November, where their manager, Brian Lane, announced that Yes had signed a new five-year contract extension with the label. The album maintained steady catalog sales over subsequent decades, ultimately earning a platinum certification for over one million units shipped on 10 April 1998.

In October 1972, Yes released "And You and I" as a condensed, two-part single in the United States, splitting the track into "Part I" and "Part II" across the 7-inch vinyl to accommodate American radio programming constraints. In the United Kingdom, the song was issued in its entirety, backed with a live rendition of "Roundabout" on the B-side. The single peaked at number 42 on the US Billboard Hot 100 chart for the week ending 16 December 1972. A standalone single edit of the title track movement "Total Mass Retain" had previously been issued on 17 July 1972 as the B-side to the group's non-album single, a progressive rock interpretation of the Simon & Garfunkel song "America".

=== Reissues ===
In 1987, Close to the Edge was reissued by Atlantic Records on Compact Disc in the United States (Note: Atlantic SD 191332) and Europe. (Note: Atlantic SD 250012) The album was digitally remastered by Joe Gastwirt for a subsequent CD reissue in 1994. (Note: Atlantic SD 826662) In 2003, Rhino and Elektra Records released an expanded and remastered edition. The packaging integrated the band's 1972 non-album single "America" alongside its B-side, the single edit of "Total Mass Retain", and featured two previously unreleased bonus tracks: an alternate version of "And You and I" and an early studio run-through of "Siberian Khatru". (Note: Elektra R2 73790)

In 2013, two separate high-fidelity editions of the album were produced. Steve Hoffman conducted a new remastering for Audio Fidelity Records in both CD and Super Audio CD (SACD) formats. (Note: Audio Fidelity AFZ147) Concurrently, the Panegyric label released a comprehensive multi-disc set. For this edition, Steven Wilson utilised the original multi-track master tapes to create a new stereo remix, a 5.1 surround sound mix, and a flat transfer of the original LP stereo master. Released in both CD/DVD-Audio and CD/Blu-ray Disc configurations, the set featured bonus instrumental mixes, single edits, and an early rough mix of the title track suite. (Note: Panegyric GYRBD50012)

On 7 March 2025, a seven-disc Super Deluxe Edition of Close to the Edge was released via Rhino Records. The box set contains a comprehensive remaster of the original album alongside new stereo, 5.1 surround sound, and Dolby Atmos mixes overseen by Wilson. The packaging also spans three discs dedicated to archival rarities and a complete, previously unreleased multi-track concert performance recorded in December 1972 at the Rainbow Theatre in London.

== Reception and legacy ==
Professional ratings
Review scores
Source	Rating
AllMusic	5/5 stars
Christgau's Record Guide	C+
Pitchfork	9.0/10
PopMatters	7/10
Rolling Stone (1972)	(favorable)
The Rolling Stone Record Guide (1979)	5/5 stars
The Rolling Stone Album Guide (2004)	4/5 stars
The Daily Vault	A
The Encyclopedia of Popular Music	5/5 stars
Under the Radar	10/10 stars

Close to the Edge received widespread acclaim from British and international music critics upon its release in September 1972, though it also polarised writers regarding its scale. Writing for Melody Maker, Chris Welch enthusiastically praised the album as a creative triumph. He described the 18-minute title track as a masterclass in progressive structure that successfully translated the band's intense live energy into a cohesive, symphonic studio piece, directly countering emerging criticisms of pompousness and structural self-indulgence within the genre. Welch concluded that the record firmly established Yes at the absolute forefront of the modern rock movement. Conversely, Ian MacDonald provided a more mixed assessment for New Musical Express on 2 September 1972, writing that the group were "not just close to the edge, they've gone right over it". While acknowledging that the musicians "played their God-damned guts out", MacDonald dismissed the record as "an attempt to overwhelm us which resulted in only unmemorable meaninglessness", though concluding that "on every level but the ordinary aesthetic one, it's one of the most remarkable records pop has yet produced."

The British weekly Disc published a highly favourable review, applauding Rick Wakeman's multi-keyboard textures and the vocal arrangements, noting that the album managed to balance uncompromising complexity with an underlying melodic warmth. In the United States, the entertainment trade journal Cashbox hailed the record as "a recording masterpiece", while Billboard selected the release for its weekly "Billboard Pick" feature. Billboard observed that Yes had "progressed to the point where they are light years beyond their emulators, proving to be no mere flash in the pan," adding that "the sound tapestries they weave are dainty fragments... All involved deserve praise and thanks, this being not a mere audio experience; transcending the medium, it brings all senses into play."

The album has continued to receive immense critical acclaim in retrospective assessments. In his review for AllMusic, Dave Thompson awarded the record a maximum five-star rating and lauded it as a "flawless masterpiece". Paul Stump's 1997 volume The Music's All that Matters: A History of Progressive Rock asserted that the record's balanced combination of grand ambition and heartfelt execution "even today draws grudging respect from Yes' most trenchant critics." In a 2005 collaborative special edition of Q and Mojo magazines, Close to the Edge was ranked third on their list of the "40 Cosmic Rock Albums". The record is featured in Robert Dimery's reference volume 1001 Albums You Must Hear Before You Die, and was voted number 67 in a reader poll of the "100 Greatest Guitar Albums of All Time" for Guitar World. Sound & Vision placed the album at number 32 on its "Top 50 Albums of All Time" master list.

The album has maintained high rankings on retrospective genre tracking directories, placing at number five on Rolling Stone's "50 Greatest Prog Rock Albums of All Time" and ranking number one on a similar index compiled by Prog magazine. It was voted number 130 in Colin Larkin's All Time Top 1000 Albums compilation. Also, in 2020 it appeared on Rolling Stone Magazine's list of "The 500 Greatest Albums of All Time". In 2023, Sean Murphy of PopMatters observed that the title track stands as "one of progressive rock's ultimate statements of purpose, worthy of every clichéd superlative imaginable... it really is epic, and it really does deliver delights only the rarest art offers." John Cunningham of WhatCulture similarly characterised the LP as an adventurous exploration through the fantastical landscape of the subconscious, concluding: "This LP is a confronting adventure through the fantastical elements of the subconscious. Each track plays out like several colourful songs in one, making this standout LP all the more impressive."

== Bruford's departure and tour ==
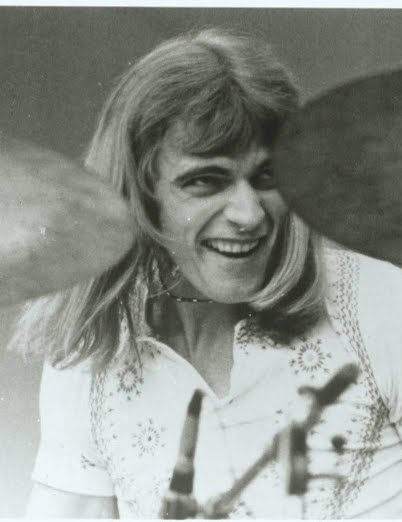
Alan White, who replaced Bruford immediately following the recording sessions and learned the complex arrangements in three days prior to the world tour.

On 19 July 1972, following the completion of the recording sessions, Bruford left Yes to join King Crimson. Although he offered to tour with the group for the remainder of the year, Howe insisted on an immediate departure, feeling that Bruford no longer possessed the necessary commitment. Howe later expressed regret over the decision, noting that he would have greatly enjoyed performing the album live with Bruford at the time. His replacement was Alan White, who had previously played with John Lennon's Plastic Ono Band and Terry Reid. Because Bruford performed on the album but exited before the promotional dates commenced, manager Brian Lane required him to share half of his album royalties with White. Furthermore, Bruford stated that Lane enforced a $10,000 compensation penalty against him for leaving the band. Years later, White agreed to return his share of those specific royalties upon Bruford's personal request.

Following Bruford's exit, Yes embarked on their most extensive world tour to date to promote the record. White completed only one full rehearsal with the group before the Close to the Edge Tour commenced on 30 July 1972, having spent the preceding three days intensely memorising the band's complex time signatures using a tape recorder and headphones. The itinerary ultimately spanned 95 concerts across the United States, Canada, the United Kingdom, Japan, and Australia, concluding in April 1973. The outing featured the live debut of keyboardist Rick Wakeman's flamboyant stage capes, which became a defining visual element of his persona, alongside the band's continued use of the "Finale" from Igor Stravinsky's The Firebird suite as their introductory walk-on music. Audio and film recordings from the tour were featured on the group's debut live album, Yessongs (1973), and the concert film of the same name. The video material was filmed during their two-night residency at London's Rainbow Theatre in December 1972 and officially released in theaters in 1975. Concluding his initial tenure with the band upon the record's completion, Close to the Edge was the final Yes studio album to feature contributions from Bruford for 19 years until Union (1991).

== Track listing ==
Track details are taken from the original 1972 UK Atlantic Records liner notes; other releases may show different information.

=== Original release ===
Side one
No.	Title	Lyrics	Music	Length
1.	"Close to the Edge"; I. "The Solid Time of Change" (6:04); II. "Total Mass Retain" (2:23); III. "I Get Up, I Get Down" (5:45); IV. "Seasons of Man" (4:31)	Jon Anderson, Steve Howe	Anderson, Howe	18:43
Total length:				18:43

Side two
No.	Title	Lyrics	Music	Length
1.	"And You and I"; I. "Cord of Life" (3:46); II. "Eclipse" (2:30); III. "The Preacher, the Teacher" (3:10); IV. "The Apocalypse" (0:47)	Anderson	Anderson, Bill Bruford, Chris Squire, Howe (except "Eclipse")	10:12
2.	"Siberian Khatru"	Anderson	Anderson, Howe, Rick Wakeman	8:56
Total length:				19:08 37:51

=== 2003 reissue bonus tracks ===
No.	Title	Lyrics	Music	Length
1.	"America" (Single version)	Paul Simon	Simon	4:12
2.	"Total Mass Retain" (Single version)			3:21
3.	"And You and I" (Alternate version)			10:17
4.	"Siberia" (Studio run-through of "Siberian Khatru")			9:19
Total length:				27:09

== Personnel ==
Track details are adapted from the original 1972 UK Atlantic Records liner notes.

Yes

- Jon Anderson – lead vocals
- Steve Howe – electric and acoustic guitars, Coral electric sitar, pedal steel guitar, backing vocals
- Chris Squire – bass guitar, backing vocals
- Rick Wakeman – acoustic and electric pianos, Hammond organ, Minimoog synthesiser, Mellotron, harpsichord, pipe organ at St Giles-without-Cripplegate
- Bill Bruford – drums, percussion

Production

- Yes – producers
- Eddy Offord – engineer, co-producer
- Mike Dunne – tape operator
- Roger Dean – cover design, illustration, photography
- Martyn Adelman – photography
- Brian Lane – band co-ordinator

== Charts ==
Chart (1972)	Peak position
Australian Albums (Kent Music Report)	21
Canada Top Albums/CDs (RPM)	7
Dutch Albums (Album Top 100)	1
German Albums (Offizielle Top 100)	36
Finnish Albums (Finnish Albums Chart)	20
Italian Albums (Musica e Dischi)	14
Japanese Albums (Oricon)	16
UK Albums (Official Charts)	4
US Billboard 200	3

Chart (2013)	Peak position
UK Independent Albums (Official Charts)	18
UK Rock & Metal Albums (Official Charts)	5

Chart (2026)	Peak position
Hungarian Physical Albums (MAHASZ)	12

== Certifications ==
Region	Certification	Certified units/sales
Canada (Music Canada)	Platinum	100,000^{^}
United Kingdom (BPI)	Platinum	300,000^{^}
United States (RIAA)	Platinum	1,000,000^{^}
^{^} Shipments figures based on certification alone.
