= And You and I =

Single by Yes

from the album Close to the Edge
- A-side: "(Part I)"
- B-side: "(Part II)"
- Released: 13 October 1972 (US)
- Genre: Progressive rock
- Length: 10:12
- Label: Atlantic
- Composers: Jon Anderson; Steve Howe (except "Eclipse"); Bill Bruford; Chris Squire
- Lyricist: Jon Anderson
- Producers: Yes; Eddie Offord

Yes singles chronology
"America" (1972)	"And You and I" (1972)	"Soon" (1975)

Close to the Edge track listing
- 3 tracks Side one: 1. "Close to the Edge"; Side two: 1. "And You and I"; 2. "Siberian Khatru"

"And You and I" is the second track from the album Close to the Edge by the English progressive rock band Yes. The song is just over ten minutes in length and consists of four movements. The first and second parts of the song were released as a single edit and reached number 42 on the Billboard Hot 100.

Introducing the song live in 1972, lead vocalist Jon Anderson said Yes called it "The Protest Song" when they were making the Close to the Edge album.

== Background ==
The song was written by Jon Anderson, Chris Squire, Bill Bruford, and Steve Howe, all of whom were members of Yes at the time. Bruford said his writing contribution to the song consisted of "a handful of chords and a sliver of melody at 3.45 repeated at 5.06 and again at 8.11".

== Content ==
=== I. Cord of Life (0:00 – 3:47) ===
The song opens with Steve Howe on 12-string acoustic guitar, his voice heard at the beginning of the track, then playing mostly natural guitar harmonics before introducing the opening guitar theme. Following a brief percussive part and a bright ping of a triangle, a lush strumming part in 3/4 time with a simple three chord chord progression in the key of D major begins. Then, the Minimoog enters introducing a short, bright melody. The vocals begin at about 1:40. The line "All complete in the sight of seeds of life with you" is sung, which is repeated throughout the song. At about 2:50, there are several distinct changes: a key change to an ambiguous tonality centering on B♭ (the chords are B♭, C, Am, and Em), a new vocal melody in 4/4 time ("Coins and crosses") accompanied by a second vocal track of Anderson singing a lower harmony with himself, plus Chris Squire and Steve Howe providing a rhythmically faster counter-melody with different, contrasting lyrics, and with their voices distorted through a rotating Leslie speaker to contrast with Anderson's lead melody. This section modulates to the key of A major in time for the first statement of the main lyrical theme of the song.

=== II. Eclipse (3:47 – 6:12) ===
"Eclipse" is the slowest part of the song based on a stately and deliberate melody that was composed by drummer Bill Bruford. It is led by Rick Wakeman's Mellotron and Minimoog, with a thematic quote from "Cord of Life" played by Steve Howe on a Sho-Bud Pro1 pedal steel guitar with distortion and a heavy delay effect. After a seamless shift to 3/4 time, Wakeman comes in with a new organ theme, followed by Anderson with a soaring, high register vocal melody. The lyrics are all from the first stanza of "Cord of Life" but applied to the new vocal melody and the slow, stately tempo. In this section, the chords are mainly derived first from the key of E major and the E Mixolydian mode (E major and D major), followed again by the key of E major during the organ solo and vocal section before ending roughly in the key of G major (with a few chords borrowed from E major). It ends with the opening 12-string acoustic guitar part from "Cord of Life" before segueing into "The Preacher, the Teacher".

=== III. The Preacher, The Teacher (6:12 – 9:25) ===
This section begins with Howe introducing a new musical theme in 3/4 meter — a folk-influenced polyphonic guitar part featuring a melody on the low strings punctuated by strummed chords on the off beats. Wakeman enters with a Minimoog line, a variation of sorts to the opening "Cord of Life" Minimoog melody. The melody and lyrical structure are very similar to that of "Cord of Life," with some variations, including a brief bass interlude by Chris Squire, and a synthesizer solo by Rick Wakeman (another variation on the "Cord Of Life" theme, this time in a minor key). The last stanza again consists of lines from "Cord of Life," now sung at a different tempo and against primarily minor chords. At 8:34 there is a reprise of the previous 3/4 instrumental section of "Eclipse," which lasts until approximately 9:12. The section ends with a cadenza-like orchestral statement, on Mellotron and Minimoog.

=== IV. Apocalypse (9:25 – 10:08) ===
"Apocalypse" is the shortest piece of the song, clocking in at about 45 seconds in length. It is in 3/4 time, in the key of E major and musically and lyrically derived from the final part of "Cord Of Life." Lyrically it consists only of four lines, accompanied only by Howe's guitars, acoustic and steel.

== Reception ==
Cash Box described the single as a "perfect example" of progressive rock, "blending four part vocal harmony with expert musicianship." Record World said "it's simply magnificent."

Paul Stump's 1997 History of Progressive Rock called the song "a tour de force of atmosphere, contrasting opaline twelve-string against [Rick] Wakeman's cavernous Mellotron, light and shade divided across the four sections with pleasing architectural skill."

== Personnel ==
- Jon Anderson – lead vocals
- Steve Howe – acoustic, electric, & pedal steel guitars, backing vocals
- Chris Squire – bass guitar, backing vocals
- Rick Wakeman – Mellotron, Minimoog, Hammond organ
- Bill Bruford – drums, percussion

== Charts ==
Chart (1972)	Peak position
Canada Top Singles (RPM)	76
US Billboard Hot 100	42
