= Close to the Edge (song) =

- UK album side one label

Song by Yes

from the album Close to the Edge
- Released: 8 September 1972
- Genre: Progressive rock
- Length: 18:43
- Label: Atlantic
- Songwriters: Jon Anderson; Steve Howe
- Producers: Yes; Eddie Offord

Close to the Edge track listing
- 3 tracks Side one: 1. "Close to the Edge"; Side two: 1. "And You and I"; 2. "Siberian Khatru"

"Close to the Edge" is a song by the English progressive rock band Yes, featured on their fifth studio album Close to the Edge (1972). The song is nearly 19 minutes in length and takes up the entire first side of the album. It consists of four movements.

== Movements ==
=== I. The Solid Time of Change (0:00 - 6:04) ===
The song fades in with the sounds of running water, wind chimes, and birds chirping; a layering of sounds derived primarily from "environmental tapes" collected by lead vocalist Jon Anderson. These nature sounds move through a crescendo and into a somewhat menacing guitar melody, which is composed of a cacophonous musical passage that features a two-note guitar line which rapidly passes down and then up four octaves, in 12/8 time. The bass ascends through a line based on the notes of the second mode of the D harmonic minor scale (also called Locrian natural 6), adding an exotic flavor to the already cacophonic texture. The guitar melody is punctuated by a series of sudden band-harmonized vocables. Again, a crescendo signals a change, this time into a more traditional and less cacophonous melody. Like a classical composition, this melodic passage is the establishment of a theme that will go through many variations throughout the piece.

The lyrics are introduced at 4:00, along with a chorus that repeats throughout the song. Like the previously established melody, this chorus will be developed in many different ways, which will include changes to the lyrical content, as well as changes in time and key signatures, tempo, and harmony:

Down at the edge, round by the corner ...
Close to the edge, down by a river

=== II. Total Mass Retain (6:04 - 8:27) ===
The song continues with generally the same melody and style, though the bass part changes significantly. The chorus here changes to a faster pace, and then slows down again at the end of the section. The final words "I get up, I get down" introduce the next segment.

This section, along with a sped-up version of the introduction of birds chirping at the beginning and a small part of the beginning of "I Get Up I Get Down" at the end, was remixed as a 3:21 single prior to the release of the album. It was included as a bonus track on the remastered version of "Close to the Edge".

At the end of this section, there is a short interlude in C major featuring a guitar riff, which is played in unison on bass with an organ part playing a repeating countermelody in sequence. This guitar riff originates from the middle of a song from Bodast (Steve Howe's previous band) "Black Leather Gloves"

This is the shortest of the four sections of "Close to the Edge".

=== III. I Get Up I Get Down (8:27 - 14:12) ===
The song significantly slows its tempo and lowers its volume. This segment consists of two sets of vocals: the main vocals, sung by Anderson which contain most of the lyrics, and the backing vocals, sung by Chris Squire and Steve Howe. At about 12 minutes into the song, Rick Wakeman, recorded on the pipe organ of London's St Giles-without-Cripplegate church, begins the main theme of this segment, which changes from a major to a minor key as the music progresses. Jon Anderson explained:

We have the 'I get up, I get down' part before it goes into a beautiful ocean of energy. You've gone through nearly 10 minutes of music that's very well put-together, but then you want to let go of it. You relax a little bit.

The song came about because Steve was playing these chords one day, and I started singing, 'Two million people barely satisfy.' It's about the incredible imbalance of the human experience on the planet.

The vocals came together nicely. I'm a big fan of the Beach Boys and the Association – such great voices. Steve and I were working on this, and at one point he said, 'I have this other song ...' And I said, 'Well, start singing it.' And he went [sings], 'In her white lace, you could clearly see the lady sadly looking / saying that she'd take the blame for the crucifixion of her own domain ...'

When I heard that, I said, 'Wait. That's going to be perfect! You start singing that with Chris, and then I'll sing my part.' We have an answer-back thing.

=== IV. Seasons of Man (14:12 - 18:43) ===
The original, fast-paced theme picks up followed by musical and lyrical structure which sounds similar to "The Solid Time of Change", except this time with exclusively major chords. Rick Wakeman's organ parts are particularly complex and an overall polytonal effect is created with the guitar part being in a different key than the keyboard. The chorus is sung one last time before the vocals build up to the climax of the song in which all three themes from the prior movements ("A seasoned witch ...", "close to the edge, down by the river", "Seasons will pass you by, I get up I get down") are presented. Afterwards, the final lyrics "I get up, I get down" are repeated as the song fades away into the "sounds of nature" in which it began.

== Music ==
In his 2021 memoir, All My Yesterdays, guitarist and co-writer Steve Howe writes that the intro was an attempt to emulate the sound of jazz guitarist John McLaughlin's Mahavishnu Orchestra, a favorite of the band's. He and Wakeman created the background drone in the "I Get Up I Get Down". Wakeman's organ part was based on a bossa nova guitar part Howe had written for another song, and Wakeman added some Minimoog lines. Another part was from a song Howe had written when part of Bodast several years earlier.

Anderson described developing the musical structure as follows:

I had sort of listened to the work of Stravinsky and Sibelius quite a lot, wondering: "How the hell did they do this?" Then it dawned on me that they have this structural concept. They would call it a stanza. You have your beginning section, the next section, then the main chorus and then the main, and repeat the first section again, but new musically changed. Change the key, but carrying on that process. I think it started when Steve [Howe] played his guitar and sang the actual first line, which was "close to the edge, round by the corner," and I was standing next to him, and he carried on playing, and I said, "down at the end, down by the river." And then I looked at him and said, "Change key" and he changed key, and I said "Seasons will pass you by. Now that it's all." It's one of those things when you work with somebody on a spontaneous level, you make sure you record everything you do, and what we did within a space of maybe an hour, we put together the first couple of stanzas – the verse-chorus, the verse-chorus, and then the next section. We were well on the way to [finding the] structure.

Howe says that Anderson, to his regret, found he was unable when performing it live to consistently sing the closing verse and chorus at the note he had hit in the studio, so the band often performed that part in E flat instead of F. "This, to my ear, is rather unsatisfactory", he complained. He noted that even Jon Davison, who has sung lead vocals for Yes since 2012, prefers to sing it lower even though in Howe's opinion he has the range to reach that note.

== Lyrics ==
The lyrical content became a kind of dream sequence in a way. The end verse is a dream that I had a long time ago about passing on from this world to another world, yet feeling so fantastic about it that death never frightened me ever since.

— Jon Anderson

In a 1996 interview, Anderson mentions that the song—indeed, the whole album—is inspired by the Hindu/Buddhist mysticism of Hermann Hesse's 1922 book Siddhartha. "[We] did one album called Close to the Edge. [It] was based on the Siddhartha ... You always come back down to the river. [You] know, all the rivers come to the same ocean. That was the basic idea. And so we made a really beautiful album." He further stated "There's a connection, like all rivers lead to the same ocean, so I thought, you know, 'Close to the edge, down by the river.' And it's like, people say 'Close to the Edge' is about disaster,' but no, it's about realization! We're on this journey, and the only reason we live is to find the divine. To find God from within."

Anderson also explained some other lyrics as follows: "'A seasoned witch can call you from the depths of your disgrace' – Your higher self can call you from the depths of your disgraceful feelings, your doubts. 'And rearrange your liver' – you can rearrange your body to a solid mental grace. The liver is a very powerful part of the body, so it can rearrange your physical self to a higher state of mind."

Due to Anderson's songwriting approach, which sometimes emphasized sound over meaning, certain lyrics are read as cryptic, such as "The time between the notes relates the colour to the scenes".

== Cover versions ==
Japanese acid rock conglomerate Ruinzhatova included the song on their 2003 album Close to the RH. Running at a length of 17:54, it is a faithful note for note version, though a second guitarist replaces the main Wakeman keyboard parts and there is "a somewhat silly-sounding vocal interpretation" throughout.

A radically altered interpretation by British band Nick Awde & Desert Hearts appears on their 2010 EP Close to the Edge B/W Rocket Man/Meryl Streep, which features no drums or guitar, and substitutes the Hammond solo opening the "Seasons of Man" section with baritone saxophone by Wizzard horn player Nick Pentelow.

== Personnel ==
- Jon Anderson – lead vocals
- Steve Howe – electric guitars, electric sitar, backing vocals
- Chris Squire – bass guitar, backing vocals
- Rick Wakeman – Hammond organ, Minimoog, Mellotron, grand piano, RMI 368 Electra-Piano and Harpsichord, pipe organ
- Bill Bruford – drums, percussion

== Sources ==
- Covach, John Rudolph; Boone, Graeme MacDonald (1997). Understanding Rock: Essays in Musical Analysis. New York: Oxford University Press. ISBN 0-19-510005-0.
