= List of progressive rock supergroups =

This is a list of progressive rock supergroups, with each band's founding line-up and members who joined within a year of founding. This list contains only groups which have performed more than a single song or live show together.

== List of progressive rock supergroups by decade ==
=== 1970s ===
Founded	Band/project name	Members	Notes
1970	Emerson, Lake & Palmer	Keith Emerson (The Nice); Greg Lake (King Crimson); Carl Palmer (Atomic Rooster)	Albums: Emerson, Lake & Palmer, Tarkus, Trilogy, Brain Salad Surgery, and more
1971	Captain Beyond	Rod Evans (Deep Purple); Bobby Caldwell (Johnny Winter); Larry "Rhino" Reinhardt (Iron Butterfly); Lee Dorman (Iron Butterfly)	Albums: Captain Beyond, Sufficiently Breathless, Dawn Explosion
1971	Matching Mole	Robert Wyatt (Soft Machine); David Sinclair (Caravan); Phil Miller (Delivery, later of Hatfield and the North, National Health); Bill MacCormick (Quiet Sun)	Albums: Matching Mole, Matching Mole's Little Red Record
1973	Badger	Tony Kaye (Yes); David Foster (The Warriors, worked with Yes); Roy Dyke (Ashton, Gardner & Dyke)	Albums: One Live Badger, White Lady
1974	Refugee	Patrick Moraz (later of Yes); Lee Jackson (The Nice, Jackson Heights); Brian Davison (The Nice, Jackson Heights)	Albums: Refugee
1974	Armageddon	Keith Relf (The Yardbirds, Renaissance); Bobby Caldwell (Johnny Winter, Captain Beyond); Martin Pugh (Steamhammer); Louis Cennamo (Renaissance, Colosseum, Steamhammer)	Albums: Armageddon
1975	National Health	Dave Stewart (Egg, Hatfield and the North); Alan Gowen (Gilgamesh); Mont Campbell (Egg); Phil Miller (Hatfield and the North); Phil Lee (Gilgamesh); Bill Bruford (Yes); Amanda Parsons (Hatfield and the North); Steve Hillage (Gong); Neil Murray (Gilgamesh)	Albums: National Health, Of Queues and Cures, D.S. Al Coda, Playtime
1976	801	Phil Manzanera (Roxy Music); Brian Eno (Roxy Music); Bill MacCormick (Quiet Sun, Matching Mole); Francis Monkman (Curved Air); Simon Phillips; Lloyd Watson	Albums: 801 Live, Listen Now, Manchester University
1977	U.K.	Eddie Jobson (Curved Air, Roxy Music); John Wetton (King Crimson, Uriah Heep); Allan Holdsworth (Gong, Soft Machine); Bill Bruford (Yes, King Crimson)	Albums: U.K., Danger Money, Night After Night and more.
1977	Strontium 90	Mike Howlett (Gong); Sting (The Police); Stewart Copeland (The Police, Curved Air); Andy Summers (Soft Machine, Kevin Ayers, later of The Police)	Albums: Strontium 90: Police Academy (released 1997)
1978	Soft Heap/Soft Head	Hugh Hopper (Soft Machine); Elton Dean (Soft Machine); Alan Gowen (Gilgamesh, National Health); Pip Pyle (Hatfield and the North, National Health)	Albums: Rogue Element, Soft Heap, A Veritable Centaur
=== 1980s ===
Founded	Band/project name	Members	Notes
1981	Asia	Geoff Downes (Yes, Buggles); John Wetton (King Crimson, Uriah Heep, U.K.); Steve Howe (Yes); Carl Palmer (Emerson, Lake & Palmer, Atomic Rooster)	Albums: Asia, Alpha, Astra, and more
1982	In Cahoots	Phil Miller (National Health, Hatfield and the North); Pip Pyle (National Health, Hatfield and the North, Soft Heap); Elton Dean (Soft Machine, Soft Heap); Peter Lemer (Gilgamesh); Richard Sinclair (The Wilde Flowers, Caravan, Camel, Hatfield and the North)	Albums: In Cahoots Live 86-89, Digging In, Live in Japan, Recent Discoveries, Parallel, Out of the Blue, All That
1983	Moraz - Bruford	Patrick Moraz (Yes, Refugee); Bill Bruford (Yes, King Crimson, U.K.)	Albums: Music for Piano and Drums, Flags
1983	News from Babel	Lindsay Cooper (Henry Cow); Chris Cutler (Henry Cow, Art Bears); Dagmar Krause (Henry Cow, Art Bears, Slapp Happy); Zeena Parkins	Albums: Work Resumed on the Tower, Letters Home
1986	GTR	Steve Hackett (Genesis); Steve Howe (Yes, Asia); Max Bacon (Bronz); Phil Spalding (Bernie Torme, Toyah, Mike Oldfield); Jonathan Mover (Steve Vai)	Album: GTR
=== 1990s ===
Founded	Band/project name	Members	Notes
1991	Short Wave	Didier Malherbe (Gong); Phil Miller (Hatfield and the North, National Health, In Cahoots); Hugh Hopper (Soft Machine, Soft Heap, In Cahoots); Pip Pyle (Hatfield and the North, National Health, Gong, In Cahoots)	Album: Short Wave Live
1992	The Chris Squire Experiment	Chris Squire (Yes); Billy Sherwood (World Trade, Lodgic, later of Yes, Circa); Alan White (Yes); Jimmy Haun (Lodgic, worked with Yes, later of Circa); Steve Porcaro (Toto)	Toured, but released no albums. Later re-emerged as Conspiracy
1997	Bozzio Levin Stevens	Terry Bozzio (Frank Zappa, U.K., Missing Persons, Steve Vai); Tony Levin (King Crimson, Peter Gabriel etc.); Steve Stevens (Billy Idol)	Albums: Black Light Syndrome, Situation Dangerous
1997	Explorers Club	Trent Gardner (Magellan); Wayne Gardner (Magellan); James LaBrie (Dream Theater); John Petrucci (Dream Theater); John Myung (Dream Theater); Derek Sherinian (Alice Cooper, Dream Theater, later Planet X); Billy Sheehan (Talas, Steve Vai, Niacin etc.); Steve Howe (Yes, Asia etc.)	Albums: Age of Impact, Raising the Mammoth
1997	Rudess/Morgenstein Project	Jordan Rudess (Dream Theater); Rod Morgenstein (Dixie Dregs)	Albums: Rudess/Morgenstein Project, The Official Bootleg
1998	Gordian Knot	Sean Malone (Cynic); Bill Bruford (King Crimson, Yes); Steve Hackett (Genesis); Trey Gunn (King Crimson); Jason Gobel (Cynic); Sean Reinert (Cynic); Paul Masvidal (Cynic); Ron Jarzombek (Watchtower); Jim Matheos (Fates Warning); John Myung (Dream Theater)	Albums: Gordian Knot, Emergent
1998	Liquid Tension Experiment	Mike Portnoy (Dream Theater); John Petrucci (Dream Theater); Jordan Rudess (Dream Theater); Tony Levin (King Crimson, Peter Gabriel etc.)	Albums: Liquid Tension Experiment, Liquid Tension Experiment 2
1999	Bruford Levin Upper Extremities	Bill Bruford (King Crimson, Yes); Tony Levin (King Crimson, Peter Gabriel etc.); David Torn (David Bowie, David Sylvian etc.); Chris Botti (Sting, Frank Sinatra etc.)	Albums: Bruford Levin Upper Extremities, B.L.U.E. Nights
1999	Qango	John Wetton (King Crimson, Asia, U.K., Uriah Heep); Carl Palmer (ELP, Asia); John Young (Asia); Dave Kilminster (John Wetton, later Keith Emerson, Roger Waters)	Album: Live in the Hood
1999	Planet X	Derek Sherinian (Alice Cooper, Dream Theater); Virgil Donati (Steve Vai); Rufus Philpot; Tony MacAlpine, left in 2004 (CAB, Vinnie Moore); T.J. Helmerich, left in 2001	Albums: Universe, Live From Oz, MoonBabies, Quantum
1999	Transatlantic	Neal Morse (Spock's Beard); Mike Portnoy (Dream Theater, Liquid Tension Experiment); Pete Trewavas (Marillion); Roine Stolt (Kaipa, The Flower Kings)	Albums: SMPT:e, Live in America, Bridge Across Forever, Live in Europe, The Whirlwind, Kaleidoscope
=== 2000s ===
Founded	Band/project name	Members	Notes
2000	Conspiracy	Chris Squire (Yes); Billy Sherwood (World Trade, Lodgic, later of Yes, Circa); Guest musicians: Alan White (Yes); Jimmy Haun (Lodgic, worked with Yes, later of Circa); Jay Schellen (World Trade, later of Asia); Steve Stevens (Billy Idol, Bozzio Levin Stevens); Michael Bland (Prince)	Albums: Conspiracy, The Unknown: Band began in 1992 as the Chris Squire Experiment
2000	John Petrucci & Jordan Rudess	John Petrucci (Dream Theater); Jordan Rudess (Dream Theater)	Album: An Evening with John Petrucci and Jordan Rudess
2002	The Tangent	Andy Tillison (Parallel or 90 Degrees); Roine Stolt (The Flower Kings); Jonas Reingold (The Flower Kings); Zoltan Csörsz (The Flower Kings); David Jackson (Van der Graaf Generator); Guy Manning	Albums: The Music That Died Alone, The World That We Drive Through, A Place in the Queue
2002	21st Century Schizoid Band	Ian McDonald (King Crimson, Foreigner, McDonald and Giles); Jakko Jakszyk (Rapid Eye Movement, The Lodge, solo, later The Tangent); Mel Collins (King Crimson, Camel); Peter Giles (Giles, Giles and Fripp, King Crimson); Michael Giles (King Crimson, McDonald and Giles, Giles, Giles and Fripp)	Albums: Official Bootleg V.1, Live in Japan, Live in Italy, Pictures Of A City — Live in New York
2002	Jelly Jam	John Myung (Dream Theater); Ty Tabor (King's X); Rod Morgenstein (Dixie Dregs)	Albums: Jelly Jam, Jelly Jam 2, Shall We Descend
2003	OSI (Office of Strategic Influence)	Jim Matheos (Fates Warning); Kevin Moore (Dream Theater, Chroma Key); Mike Portnoy (Dream Theater) (full band member in 2003, session musician in 2006); Guest musicians: Sean Malone (Cynic, Gordian Knot) (2003); Steven Wilson (Porcupine Tree) (2003); Joey Vera (Fates Warning) (2006); Gavin Harrison (Porcupine Tree) (2009, 2012); Mikael Akerfeldt (Opeth) (2009); Tim Bowness (No-Man) (2009)	Albums: Office of Strategic Influence, Free, Blood, Fire Make Thunder
2004	Altera Enigma	Jason De Ron (Paramaecium, Soundscape, inExordium); Kenny Cheong (Soundscape) - joined in 2005; Jayson Sherlock (Horde, Mortification, Paramaecium, Fearscape, Deliverance, InExordium, Soundscape, Revulsed) - joined in 2007; Former member: Jefray Arwadi (Kekal, Doctor D, Armageddon Holocaust, Excision, Inner Warfare) - co-founder with De Ron, left the band in 2009	Albums: Alteration
2004	The Sound of Animals Fighting	Rich Balling (Rx Bandits, later Pyramids); Anthony Green (Circa Survive, Saosin); Matthew Kelly (The Autumns, later Pyramids); Matt Embree (Rx Bandits, Dispatch); Craig Owens (Chiodos); Keith Goodwin (Days Away, Good Old War); Chris Tsagakis (Rx Bandits); Steve Choi (Rx Bandits); Joe Troy (Rx Bandits); Chris Sheets (Rx Bandits); Bradley Bell (Chiodos)	Albums: Tiger and the Duke, Lover, the Lord Has Left Us..., The Ocean and the Sun
2005	White	Alan White (Yes, John Lennon); Geoff Downes (Yes, Asia); Kevin Currie (MerKaBa); Steve Boyce (MerKaBa); Karl Haug (Treason); Ted Stockwell (Treason), left 2005	Albums: Loyal (unreleased) White (2006)
2006	Circa	Billy Sherwood (Yes, Conspiracy, Lodgic, Air Supply); Alan White (Yes, Conspiracy, Plastic Ono Band); Tony Kaye (Yes, David Bowie); Jimmy Haun (Lodgic, Air Supply)	Album: Circa 2007
2007	Amaran's Plight	D. C. Cooper (Royal Hunt, Silent Force); Gary Wehrkamp (Shadow Gallery); Nick D'Virgilio (Spock's Beard, Kevin Gilbert, Tears for Fears, Genesis)	Album: Voice in the Light
2007	UKZ	Eddie Jobson (U.K., Jethro Tull); Trey Gunn (King Crimson); Alex Machacek (Planet X); Marco Minnemann (Mike Keneally, David Torn)	EP: Radiation
2009	Yoso	Bobby Kimball (Toto); Billy Sherwood (Yes, CIRCA:, Conspiracy, Lodgic, Air Supply); Tony Kaye (Yes, CIRCA:, David Bowie); Jimmy Haun (CIRCA:, Lodgic, Air Supply); Jay Schellen (CIRCA:); Lou Molino III (Trevor Rabin)	Album: Elements
2009	Floating Me	Andrew Gillespie (Scary Mother); Antony Brown (Scary Mother); Tobias Messiter (Scary Mother); Lucius Borich (COG); Jon Stockman (Karnivool)	Album: Floating Me
=== 2010s ===
Founded	Band/project name	Members	Notes
2012	Flying Colors	Casey McPherson (Alpha Rev); Steve Morse (Deep Purple, Dixie Dregs); Dave LaRue; Neal Morse (Spock's Beard, Transatlantic); Mike Portnoy (Dream Theater, Adrenaline Mob)	Albums: Flying Colors, Second Nature, Third Degree
2014	The Birds of Satan	Taylor Hawkins (Foo Fighters); Wiley Hodgden (Chevy Metal); Mick Murphy (Chevy Metal)	Album: The Birds of Satan
2014	The Mute Gods	Nick Beggs (Iona, Steve Hackett, Steven Wilson); Roger King (Steve Hackett); Marco Minnemann (Mike Keneally, David Torn, The Aristocrats, Steven Wilson)	Albums: Do Nothing till You Hear from Me, Tardigrades Will Inherit the Earth, Atheists and Believers
2017	Sons of Apollo	Jeff Scott Soto (Journey, Yngwie Malmsteen); Ron "Bumblefoot" Thal (Guns N' Roses, Art of Anarchy); Billy Sheehan (The Winery Dogs, Mr. Big, David Lee Roth); Derek Sherinian (Dream Theater, Black Country Communion); Mike Portnoy (The Winery Dogs, Flying Colors, Dream Theater, Transatlantic, Adrenaline Mob)	Album: Psychotic Symphony
2017	The Sea Within	Roine Stolt (Kaipa, The Flower Kings, Transatlantic, The Tangent); Jonas Reingold (The Flower Kings, Kaipa, Karmakanic, The Tangent); Marco Minnemann (Mike Keneally, David Torn, The Aristocrats, Steven Wilson, The Mute Gods); Tom Brislin (Yes, Renaissance, later Kansas); Daniel Gildenlöw (Pain of Salvation, The Flower Kings, Transatlantic); Guest and touring member: Casey McPherson (Alpha Rev, Flying Colors)	Album: The Sea Within
=== 2020s ===
2021	Arc of Life	Billy Sherwood (Lodgic, World Trade, Circa, Yes, Asia); Jon Davison (Glass Hammer, Yes); Jay Schellen (Hurricane, Unruly Child, Asia, World Trade, Circa); Jimmy Haun (Circa); Dave Kerzner (Sound of Contact, Sonic Elements)	Album: Arc of Life
=== Star coverbands ===
Founded	Band/project name	Members	Notes
1993	Spin 1ne 2wo	Phil Palmer (Pet Shop Boys, Eric Clapton, Dire Straits); Paul Carrack (Mike + The Mechanics); Steve Ferrone (The Bee Gees, Brian May); Rupert Hine (Tina Turner, The Fixx, Bob Geldof, Rush); Tony Levin (King Crimson, Peter Gabriel)	The band covered classic rock songs by Jimi Hendrix, The Who, Led Zeppelin, Blind Faith, Steely Dan and Bob Dylan.
2003	Yellow Matter Custard	Mike Portnoy (Dream Theater, Liquid Tension Experiment, Transatlantic, OSI); Neal Morse (Spock's Beard, Transatlantic); Paul Gilbert (Racer X, Mr. Big); Matt Bissonette (Jughead, Joe Satriani, ELO)	The Beatles cover band.
2006	Hammer of the Gods	Paul Gilbert (Racer X, Mr. Big); Daniel Gildenlöw (Pain of Salvation); Dave LaRue (Dixie Dregs, Steve Morse); Mike Portnoy (Dream Theater, Liquid Tension Experiment, Transatlantic, OSI)	Led Zeppelin cover band.
2006	Cygnus and the Sea Monsters	Paul Gilbert (Racer X, Mr. Big); Sean Malone (Cynic, Gordian Knot); Mike Portnoy (Dream Theater, Liquid Tension Experiment, Transatlantic, OSI)	Rush cover band.
2007	Amazing Journey	Paul Gilbert (Racer X, Mr. Big); Gary Cherone (Extreme); Billy Sheehan (Talas, Steve Vai, Niacin etc.); Mike Portnoy (Dream Theater, Liquid Tension Experiment, Transatlantic, OSI)	The Who cover band.
=== Abortive projects ===
Founded	Band/project name	Members	Notes
c. 1976	British Bulldog	Bill Bruford (Yes, King Crimson, later of U.K.); John Wetton (King Crimson, later of UK); Rick Wakeman (Yes, Strawbs)	Rehearsed, but project fell apart. Some material later re-used on U.K.'s first album and on Rick Wakeman's Criminal Record.
1980	unnamed band	Rick Wakeman (Yes, Strawbs); John Wetton (King Crimson, U.K., later of Asia); Carl Palmer (Emerson, Lake & Palmer, later of Asia); Trevor Rabin (later of Yes)	Group proposed by Geffen Records, but Wakeman walked out before the band had ever played together; described in Wakeman's autobiography "Say Yes!".
1981	XYZ	Chris Squire (Yes); Alan White (Yes); Jimmy Page (The Yardbirds, Led Zeppelin)	Recorded demos; some material later re-used in other bands.
