= Guy Allison =

American musician (born 1959)

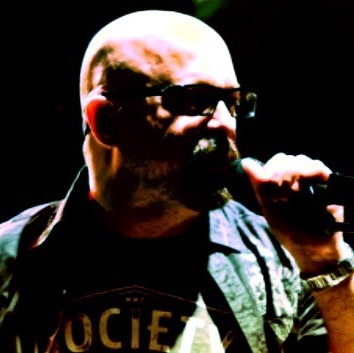
- Allison during a Doobie Brothers concert in Niagara Falls, 2014

Background information
- Born: Guy Allison Steiner; April 23, 1959 (age 67); Los Angeles, California, U.S.
- Genres: Rock, progressive rock
- Occupations: Musician
- Instruments: Piano, keyboards, vocals
- Years active: 1981–present
- Member of: Unruly Child
- Formerly of: Lodgic, Air Supply, The Doobie Brothers, World Trade, Moody Blues
- Website: guyallison.net

Guy Allison (born April 23, 1959) is an American musician. He was the touring keyboardist for the Doobie Brothers from 1996 to 2015 and was featured on their 2000 release Sibling Rivalry.

== Biography ==
His first record deal was signed with a band called Lodgic on A&M Records in 1985. This band included Michael Sherwood, Billy Sherwood, Jimmy Haun and Gary Starnes. The band was discovered by the 80's group Toto and was subsequently produced by Toto members David Paich and Steve Porcaro (also credited are Greg Ladanyi and Tom Knox). Although the album Nomadic Sands failed to chart in the U.S., the first single Lonely Man was featured in the movie Prince of Bel Air, starring Mark Harmon & Kirstie Alley.

In 1987, Allison was selected by Patrick Moraz to fill the second keyboardist chair for the Moody Blues, a position he held until 1990. While touring with the Moodies he was a member of World Trade signed to Polygram Records. Recording their progressive self-titled debut album in 1988, produced by Keith Olsen, this group included ex-Lodgic bandmate Billy Sherwood along with Bruce Gowdy and Mark Williams. While this band found moderate success, appearing on MTV and the Billboard Rock charts, they subsequently broke up in 1990.

After the breakup of World Trade, Allison was tapped by Graham Russell to join Air Supply in the recording studio and ultimately on tour. This 7-year relationship generated 4 studio albums, 1 live album and 2 "best of" releases. Credited with co-writing 6 songs, 3 of these Allison/Russell co-compositions charted internationally.

During his time with Air Supply, he and ex-World Trade bandmate, Bruce Gowdy, formed the harder edge Unruly Child with singer Mark Free. Signed by Interscope Records and produced by Beau Hill in 1991, Unruly Child, (whose members included Larry Antonino and Asia's Jay Schellen) found cult status overseas yet remained undiscovered in the U.S.

After Unruly Child disbanded, Allison continued to tour with both Air Supply and Japanese artist Eikichi Yazawa. He forged a musical relationship with other Yazawa touring members, John McFee and Keith Knudsen, which led to him joining The Doobie Brothers in 1996 as a touring keyboardist. Allison co-produced the Doobies' 12th studio album, 2000's Sibling Rivalry, on which he also co-wrote three tracks.

In August 2015, Allison was called to work on an album project in Japan. Bill Payne was selected to take his place as the Doobies' keyboardist for a few weeks while Allison was away. Upon his return from Japan, Allison briefly returned to the Doobie Brothers. By October 2015, Allison stepped down from his position with the Doobie Brothers after 19 years. Payne took over Allison's keyboard duties for the Doobie Brothers in December of that year.

Allison released his debut solo album, A Designed Presence, in 2023.

== Discography (album appearances) ==
This is not an exhaustive list.

- Lodgic – Lodgic
- Gavin Christopher – Gavin
- Don Henley – Building the Perfect Beast (uncredited on album)
- Boz Scaggs – Other Roads
- World Trade – World Trade
- World Trade – Euphoria
- Unruly Child – Unruly Child
- Unruly Child – Waiting for the Sun
- Unruly Child – UCIII
- Unruly Child – The Basement Demos
- Bobby Kimball – Rise Up
- Glenn Hughes – Feel
- Nick Kamen – Us
- Manic Eden – Manic Eden
- Peter Lewis – Peter Lewis
- Air Supply – The Earth Is...
- Air Supply – The Vanishing Race
- Air Supply – News from Nowhere
- Air Supply – Now and Forever...Greatest Hits Live
- Air Supply – The Book of Love
- Air Supply – Forever Love
- Air Supply – Free Love
- Air Supply – The Ultimate Collection
- Empty Trash – Holiday in the Sun: Soundtrack (Mary-Kate and Ashley Olsen)
- Eikichi Yazawa – Subway Express
- Eikichi Yazawa – Subway Express 2
- Eikichi Yazawa – Lotta Good Time
- L. Shankar – Shankar & Gingger – One in a Million
- L. Shankar – Celestial Body
- The Doobie Brothers – Rockin' Down the Highway: The Wildlife Concert
- The Doobie Brothers – Long Train Runnin'
- The Doobie Brothers – Sibling Rivalry
- The Doobie Brothers – Live at Wolf Trap
- Carlene Carter – Stronger
