= Arc of Life =

British progressive rock group (2020–2022)

- Genres: Progressive rock
- Years active: 2020–2022
- Label: Frontiers
- Spinoff of: Yes
- Members: Jon Davison; Billy Sherwood; Jay Schellen; Jimmy Haun; Dave Kerzner

Arc of Life was a progressive rock supergroup featuring three members of Yes: vocalist and guitarist Jon Davison, bassist and vocalist Billy Sherwood, and drummer Jay Schellen, along with keyboardist Dave Kerzner of Sound of Contact and guitarist Jimmy Haun, who has featured on Yes' 1991 Union album and worked with Sherwood on the projects Circa and Yoso.

== History ==
Arc of Life spawned from Sherwood's relationship with Davison working on the Yes tours.

After launching in December 2020, the band's debut album Arc of Life was released through Frontiers Records on February 12, 2021. They returned in September 2022 with the single "All Things Considered", taken from the band's second album Don't Look Down, released on November 18.

Sherwood described the band as "kind of parked" in April 2024, with three members of the band all working together in Yes. Kerzner in 2025 described the band as "probably done".

== Members ==
Adapted from Blabbermouth.net.

- Billy Sherwood – bass and vocals
- Jon Davison – vocals
- Jay Schellen – drums
- Jimmy Haun – guitars
- Dave Kerzner – keyboards

== Discography ==
Albums

- Arc of Life (2021)
- Don't Look Down (2022)

Singles

- "You Make It Real" (2020)
- "Just in Sight" (2021)
- "All Things Considered" (2022)
- "Let Live" (2022)
