= Circa 2007 =

Studio album by Circa
- Released: 2007
- Recorded: 2006–2007, Uncle Studios
- Genre: Rock, progressive rock
- Length: 56:24
- Label: Self-released (in co-operation with The Lab)
- Producer: Circa

Circa 2007 (stylized as CIRCA: 2007) is the debut album by Circa, a progressive rock band consisting of then former Yes members Billy Sherwood (bass, vocals), Tony Kaye (keyboards) and Alan White (drums), as well as Jimmy Haun (guitar), who had worked with Yes as a session musician. Billy's elder brother Michael Sherwood also appears. Two tracks are based on material Billy Sherwood and Trevor Rabin were developing in the mid-1990s.

The album was released independently on 30 July 2007.

== Tracks listing ==
All tracks are written by Billy Sherwood, Tony Kaye, Alan White and Jimmy Haun, except "Don't Let Go' and "Look Inside" by Sherwood, Kaye, White, Haun, and Trevor Rabin

No.	Title	Length
1.	"Cut the Ties"	5:40
2.	"Don't Let Go"	6:57
3.	"Together We Are"	6:31
4.	"Information Overload"	5:54
5.	"Trust in Something"	7:55
6.	"Keeper of the Flame"	2:32
7.	"Life Going By"	3:47
8.	"Look Inside"	5:04
9.	"Brotherhood of Man"	11:48

== Personnel ==
CIRCA

- Billy Sherwood - bass, lead vocals
- Jimmy Haun - electric & acoustic guitars, backing vocals
- Tony Kaye - keyboards
- Alan White - drums, percussion, backing vocals

Additional musicians

- Cole Coleman - laúd on track 3
- Michael Sherwood - vocoder

Production

- Arranged & Produced By Circa
- Recorded, Engineered & Mixed By Billy Sherwood
- Studio techs: Ric Luxembourg, Mark Ferguson, John Cox, Scott Walton and everybody at Uncle Studios
- Mastered By Joe Gastwirt
