= Aurora (Yes album) =

Studio album by Yes
- Released: 12 June 2026
- Recorded: 2024–2025
- Genre: Progressive rock
- Length: 59:28
- Labels: InsideOut; Sony
- Producer: Steve Howe

Yes chronology
Yessingles (2023)	Aurora (2026)

Singles from Aurora
- 1. "Aurora" Released: 10 April 2026; 2. "Turnaround Situation" Released: 20 May 2026

Aurora is the twenty-fourth studio album by English progressive rock band Yes, released on 12 June 2026 by InsideOut Music and Sony Music.

Yes started work on the album shortly after the release of Mirror to the Sky in May 2023. As with the band's immediate preceding albums, guitarist Steve Howe resumed his role as producer, and orchestral arrangements were provided. Unlike the last two albums, the orchestral parts of the album were provided by the Czech National Symphony Orchestra. It was notably the band's first studio album to feature the same line-up as its predecessor since 1997's Keys to Ascension 2, seven albums prior.

Aurora debuted at number 42 in the UK and number 8 in Germany. The album was released on CD, LP, Blu-ray, and digital platforms, with some editions containing additional artwork by long-time Yes cover artist Roger Dean.

== Background and recording ==
During an interview in early 2024, Billy Sherwood confirmed work had begun on Aurora, telling Rolling Stone, "We're making a new album as we speak. When was the last time Yes made so many albums in a row in such a short period of time? That's driven by Steve's inspiration to produce it and to go forward".

Once The Classic Tales of Yes tour finished in late 2024, the band started fully working on the album by developing ideas in home studios and then bringing them together through ongoing exchanges.

Before this album, Billy Sherwood and Jon Davison lived full time in the United States, but they started living part time in the United Kingdom. Steve Howe said, “Jon and Billy have English partners now, which is very good. Of course, we still do a lot of file sharing, and I’ve a base that Jon comes to, but we don’t force people to be in the same room all the time just because they live here”.

Jay Schellen, as the only member to not have residence in the United Kingdom, said of the recording process, "We've been doing this for the last three records. It's remote recording. Billy and I had many sessions together, here in Los Angeles, where we put forward quite a bit of material. Billy splits his time between Vegas and London. So he is here in the US and that's when we get together. In the UK, there's the studio where Jon, and Geoff rendezvous. Billy as well".

In early 2025, Geoff Downes said, "It's a lot more progressive sounding than the last few albums. It's an album with attention to details and musicianship, which is what Yes is all about". In another March 2025 interview, when asked what is going on with Yes, Downes replied, "We've been working on an album for the past six months".

Davison described the album as, "very much part of a trifecta with the last two albums. There is a continuity from The Quest to Mirror to the Sky, then to Aurora. Just like we evolved from The Quest and did Mirror, we’ve gone another direction with Aurora. So there’ll be enough familiarity there".

The album's title emerged early from the writing process, with Davison recalling that the name immediately resonated with Howe and helped spark visual inspiration for artist Roger Dean, who designed the album artwork alongside Freyja Dean.

== Release ==
Previously unknown information about the album was leaked a few days before its official announcement, with the names of album, tracks, and the album cover being leaked alongside photos of the physical cartridge and information about the deluxe physical edition.

== Reception ==
Professional ratings
Aggregate scores
Source	Rating
Metacritic	72/100
Review scores
Source	Rating
PopMatters	8/10
Uncut	7/10
MusicOMH	3.5/5 stars
Record Collector	6/10

Rock Cellar Magazine described the title track as a "fittingly epic sonic experience". Consequence of Sound said, "The piece showcases symphonic elements not seen since 2001’s Magnification, underscoring a spritely and bright piece of music befitting the Yes legacy". PopMatters saw it as an improvement of the records Davison previously fronted: "Progressive rock needs to constantly evolve, in keeping with the genre’s title, to distinguish it from other blues variants. Yes continue to evolve; Aurora proves Davison is just getting warmed up as frontman."

== Track listing ==
Aurora track listing
No.	Title	Writer(s)	Length
1.	"Aurora"	Jon Davison, Steve Howe	7:25
2.	"Turnaround Situation"	Davison	5:48
3.	"Love Lies Dreaming"	Davison, Howe	6:24
4.	"Countermovement": i. "Taro" [Howe]; ii. "Anytime Soon" [Downes/Howe]; iii. "Blink of an Eye" [Davison/Sherwood/Schellen]; iv. "Freedom's Edge" [Howe]"	Davison, Howe, Geoff Downes, Billy Sherwood, Jay Schellen	13:44
5.	"Ariadne"	Davison, Downes, Sherwood	6:14
6.	"All Hands on Deck"	Howe	3:03
7.	"Outside the Box": i. "Light" [Howe]; ii. "Outbox [Howe/Sherwood]"	Howe, Sherwood	4:18
8.	"Emotional Intelligence"	Davison	3:30
9.	"Jambustin'"	Davison, Howe	4:22
10.	"Watching the River Roll"	Sherwood	4:40
Total length:			59:28

== Personnel ==
Yes

- Jon Davison – lead vocals (tracks 1–3, 5, 8, 9), vocals (tracks 7i, 7ii), duo vocals (tracks 4ii, 4iii, 6, 10), electric rhythm guitar (track 1), organ (tracks 1, 2, 8), piano (tracks 2, 3, 8), acoustic rhythm guitar (track 2), synth (track 3), acoustic guitar (track 8)
- Steve Howe – guitars, (Note: Steinberger electric 12-string guitar (tracks 1, 4iii), Fender Telecaster (tracks 1, 4iii, 6), Gibson ES-175D (tracks 1, 2, 4iii, 6), Variax sitar guitar (tracks 1, 4iii, 6), Gibson Les Paul Junior (tracks 1, 2, 7ii), Williams pedal steel (track 2), Gibson Chet Atkins nylon-string guitar (tracks 2, 3), Steinberger GM4T electric guitar (tracks 3, 8), steel guitar (tracks 4i, 4iv), acoustic and electric guitars (tracks 4ii, 4iv), Fender steel guitar (tracks 4iii, 6, 8, 9), Martin MC38 SH acoustic guitar (tracks 4iii, 5, 9), Martin 0018SH acoustic guitar (track 4iii), Gibson Tennessean (track 4iii), Portuguese 12-string guitar (tracks 4iii, 10), electric Leslie guitar (track 5), acoustic Gibson ES-175D double-wah guitar (track 5), Martin J12-65M 12-string acoustic guitar (track 6), 6- and 12-string acoustic guitar (track 7i), Martin MC28 and 000-C acoustic guitars (track 7ii), Fender Stratocaster (track 9), Gibson ES-175D Leslie guitar (track 10)) mandolin (tracks 4ii, 10), Gibson F4 mandolin (track 4iii), autoharp (track 1), harmonica (track 4iii), duo vocals (tracks 4ii, 6), harmony vocal (track 2), vocal (track 7i), additional keyboards (track 1), additional synth (track 9), washboard (track 9)
- Geoff Downes – synth (tracks 1, 2, 4ii, 9, 10), chorus organ (track 1), verse piano (track 3), organ (tracks 4i, 6, 8), piano (tracks 4ii, 4iii, 5, 9), Mellotron (track 4iii), string synths (track 4iv), lead synth (track 7ii)
- Billy Sherwood – bass guitar (tracks 1–6, 7ii, 8–10), vocals (tracks 1, 2, 5, 7i, 7ii), duo vocals (tracks 4iii, 10), additional electric guitar (tracks 4ii, 5)
- Jay Schellen – drums (tracks 1–6, 7ii, 8–10)

Additional musicians

- Czech National Symphony Orchestra, conducted by Vladimir Martinka (1, 5)

Production

- Steve Howe – producer
- Curtis Schwartz – mixing, mastering
- Roger Dean – cover art, logo
- Freyja Dean – cover art

== Charts ==
Chart performance for Aurora
Chart (2026)	Peak position
Austrian Albums (Ö3 Austria)	20
Belgian Albums (Ultratop Flanders)	68
Belgian Albums (Ultratop Wallonia)	26
Croatian International Albums (HDU)	27
French Albums (SNEP)	125
French Rock & Metal Albums (SNEP)	10
German Albums (Offizielle Top 100)	8
German Rock & Metal Albums (Offizielle Top 100)	5
Italian Physical Albums (FIMI)	14
Japanese Albums (Oricon)	27
Japanese Rock Albums (Oricon)	5
Norwegian Physical Albums (IFPI Norge)	4
Norwegian Rock Albums (IFPI Norge)	13
Polish Albums (ZPAV)	94
Scottish Albums (Official Charts)	5
Spanish Albums (Promusicae)	95
Swedish Physical Albums (Sverigetopplistan)	9
Swiss Albums (Schweizer Hitparade)	12
UK Albums (Official Charts)	42
UK Rock & Metal Albums (Official Charts)	3
US Top Album Sales (Billboard)	36
