= Return to the Dark Side of the Moon =

Return to the Dark Side of the Moon: A Tribute to Pink Floyd

Studio album (tribute album) by Billy Sherwood
- Released: 2006
- Recorded: 2005
- Genre: Progressive rock
- Length: 48:47
- Label: Purple Pyramid
- Producer: Billy Sherwood

Return to the Dark Side of the Moon (subtitled: A Tribute to Pink Floyd) is a tribute album organised by Billy Sherwood, and released in 2006 on Purple Pyramid. It is a re-creation of Pink Floyd's The Dark Side of the Moon, and a sequel to Sherwood's Back Against the Wall, itself a re-creation of Pink Floyd's The Wall. Return to the Dark Side of the Moon, in addition includes an original piece composed by Sherwood (and recorded with Tony Kaye and Robby Krieger) in the style of the original album.

The album features guests mostly from the world of progressive rock, including former Yes members Peter Banks, Geoff Downes, Rick Wakeman, Kaye and Sherwood himself.

== Track listing ==
1. "Speak to Me" (Mason) / "Breathe" (Waters, Wright, Gilmour) (featuring Malcolm McDowell, Adrian Belew, Jeff Baxter, Tony Kaye, Alan White, John Giblin) 5:44
2. "On the Run" (Waters, Wright, Gilmour) (featuring Larry Fast, Alan White) 3:17
3. "Time" (Waters, Wright, Gilmour, Mason) (featuring Gary Green, Billy Sherwood, Michael Sherwood, Robby Krieger, David Sancious, Alan White, Jay Schellen, Colin Moulding, CC White) 6:58
4. "The Great Gig in the Sky" (Wright, Clare Torry) (featuring Rick Wakeman, CC White, Steve Howe, Jay Schellen, Billy Sherwood) 4:40
5. "Money" (Waters) (featuring Tommy Shaw, Peter Banks, Edgar Winter, Gary Green, Billy Sherwood, Mike Baird, Tony Levin) 6:24
6. "Us and Them" (Waters, Wright) (featuring John Wetton, Scott Page, Dweezil Zappa, Tony Kaye, Pat Mastelotto, Jimmy Haslip, Bob Kulick, Michael Sherwood) 7:34
7. "Any Colour You Like" (Wright, Gilmour, Mason) (featuring Robben Ford, Steve Porcaro, Billy Sherwood, Aynsley Dunbar, Tony Franklin) 4:13
8. "Brain Damage" (Waters) (featuring Colin Moulding, Robby Krieger, Geoff Downes, Vinnie Colaiuta, Del Palmer, Michael Sherwood, Billy Sherwood) 3:51
9. "Eclipse" (Waters) (featuring Billy Sherwood, Peter Banks, Tony Kaye, Vinnie Colaiuta, John Wetton, CC White) 2:07
10. "Where We Belong" (Sherwood) (featuring Billy Sherwood, Robby Krieger, Tony Kaye) 3:56
- Track 10 is an "exclusive original bonus track".

== Participants ==
- Peter Banks: guitar
- Jeff Baxter: guitar, pedal steel
- Adrian Belew: vocals
- Mike Baird: drums
- Vinnie Colaiuta: drums
- Geoff Downes: keyboards
- Aynsley Dunbar: drums
- Larry Fast: keyboards
- Robben Ford: guitar
- Tony Franklin: bass
- John Giblin: bass
- Gary Green: guitar
- Jimmy Haslip: bass
- Steve Howe: guitar
- Tony Kaye: keyboards
- Bob Kulick: guitar
- Robby Krieger: guitar
- Tony Levin: bass
- Steve Lukather: guitar
- Malcolm McDowell: vocals
- Pat Mastelotto: drums
- Colin Moulding: vocals, bass
- Scott Page: sax
- Del Palmer: bass
- Steve Porcaro: keyboards
- David Sancious: keyboards
- Jay Schellen: drums
- Tommy Shaw: vocals
- Billy Sherwood: vocals, keyboards, guitar
- Michael Sherwood: vocals
- Rick Wakeman: keyboards
- John Wetton: bass, vocals
- Alan White: drums
- CC White: vocals
- Edgar Winter: sax
- Dweezil Zappa: guitar

== Production ==
- Produced & Mixed by Billy Sherwood
- Engineers: Billy Sherwood, Rob Audrey, Ken Latchney, Erik Jordan, Andy Partridge, Jeff Knowler
- Mastered by Joe Gastwirt
