= Lodgic =

American rock band (1977–1987)

- Origin: United States
- Genres: Pop rock, progressive rock, AOR
- Years active: 1977–1987
- Past members: Michael Sherwood; Jimmy Haun; Gary Starnes; Mike Hulsey; Guy Allison; Billy Sherwood

Lodgic was an American rock band who released one album, Nomadic Sands (1985).

== History ==
The band was formed in Las Vegas by childhood friends Michael Sherwood (keyboards, backing vocals) and Jimmy Haun (guitar) with Gary Starnes (drums) and Mike Hulsey (keyboards). They later moved to Los Angeles.

Guy Allison joined on keyboards, as did Michael's younger brother Billy Sherwood at the age of 16 in 1981.

After many years of trying to get things together, they recorded their debut and sole album Nomadic Sands, released in 1985 on A&M Records, performed by the Sherwoods, Haun, Allison and Starnes. The album was co-produced by David Paich and Steve Porcaro (both of Toto) and Tom Knox. Although the album failed to chart in the U.S., the first single "Lonely Man" was featured in the movie Prince of Bel Air, starring Mark Harmon and Kirstie Alley.

Lodgic opened some dates for Supertramp, but the band came to an end, evolving into World Trade with Billy Sherwood and Allison.

While the band's output was limited, its legacy was in future collaborations. As well as World Trade, both Sherwoods and Haun later worked with Yes, all three appearing on Union. Billy Sherwood and Haun later worked together in The Key, The Chris Squire Experiment and Circa.

== Personnel ==
=== Members ===
- Michael Sherwood - vocals, keyboards (d. 2019)
- Jimmy Haun - guitars, vocals
- Gary Starnes - drums
- Mike Hulsey - keyboards
- Guy Allison - keyboards, vocals
- Billy Sherwood - vocals, bass guitar

== Discography ==
- Nomadic Sands (1985)
