= Yessingles =

Compilation album by Yes
- Released: 6 October 2023
- Recorded: 1970–1983
- Genre: Progressive rock; pop rock
- Length: 44:11
- Label: Rhino
- Producer: Yes; Eddie Offord; Trevor Horn

Yes chronology
Mirror to the Sky (2023)	Yessingles (2023)	Aurora (2026)

Singles from Yessingles
- 1. "And You and I [Promo Radio Edit]" Released: 20 August 2023

Professional ratings
Review scores
Source	Rating
Prog	2.5/5 stars

Yessingles is a compilation album by British progressive rock band Yes, released by record label Rhino on 6 October 2023. It compiles rare single versions of 12 of the band's biggest hits between 1970 and 1983 in chronological order, and is notable for being the first time the promo radio edit of "And You and I" was released digitally, being the lead single in promotion of the record.

== Track listing ==
Side one
No.	Title	Writer(s)	Album	Length
1.	"Your Move"	Jon Anderson	The Yes Album (1971)	3:35
2.	"Starship Trooper: Life Seeker" (single version)	Anderson	The Yes Album (1971)	3:26
3.	"Roundabout" (single edit)	Anderson; Steve Howe	Fragile (1971)	3:27
4.	"America" (2003 remaster)	Paul Simon	The New Age of Atlantic (1972)	4:12
5.	"And You and I (Part 1)" (promo radio edit)	Anderson; Bill Bruford; Chris Squire; Howe	Close to the Edge (1972)	3:25
6.	"Soon"	Anderson	Relayer (1974)	4:18
Total length:				22:23

Side two
No.	Title	Writer(s)	Album	Length
7.	"Sound Chaser" (single edit)	Anderson; Howe; Squire; Patrick Moraz; Alan White	Relayer (1974)	3:10
8.	"Wonderous Stories" (2013 remaster)	Anderson	Going for the One (1977)	3:45
9.	"Don't Kill the Whale" (2007 remaster)	Anderson; Squire	Tormato (1978)	3:23
10.	"Into the Lens" (2003 remaster)	Geoff Downes; Trevor Horn; Howe; Squire; White	Drama (1980)	3:47
11.	"Owner of a Lonely Heart" (2003 remaster)	Trevor Rabin; Anderson; Squire; Horn	90125 (1983)	3:50
12.	"Leave It" (single remix)	Squire; Rabin; Horn	90125 (1983)	3:53
Total length:				21:48; 44:11

== Personnel ==
Yes

- Jon Anderson – lead vocals, backing vocals, percussion, piccolo (tracks 1–9, 11, 12)
- Trevor Horn – lead vocals, fairlight CMI programming (track 10)
- Chris Squire – bass guitar, backing vocals, bass pedals, piano (all tracks)
- Steve Howe – electric guitars, acoustic guitars, backing vocals, pedal steel guitar, vachalia, electric sitar, console steel guitar, telecaster (tracks 1–10)
- Trevor Rabin – co-lead vocals, backing vocals, electric guitars, synclavier, fairlight CMI, keyboards (tracks 11, 12)
- Tony Kaye – Hammond organ, piano, Moog (tracks 1, 2, 11, 12)
- Rick Wakeman – Hammond organ, Harpsichord, Minimoog, grand piano, Mellotron, synthesizer, organ, polymoog, birotron (tracks 3–5, 8, 9)
- Patrick Moraz – piano, electric piano, Hammond organ, Minimoog, Mellotron (tracks 6, 7)
- Geoff Downes – keyboards, vocoder (track 10)
- Bill Bruford – drums, percussion (tracks 1–5)
- Alan White – drums, percussion, fairlight CMI programming, backing vocals (tracks 6–12)

Additional Musicians

- Colin Goldring – recorder on "Your Move"

== Charts ==
Weekly chart performance for Yessingles
Chart (2023)	Peak position
Hungarian Physical Albums (MAHASZ)	28
