= Scott Connor =

American drummer (born 1960)

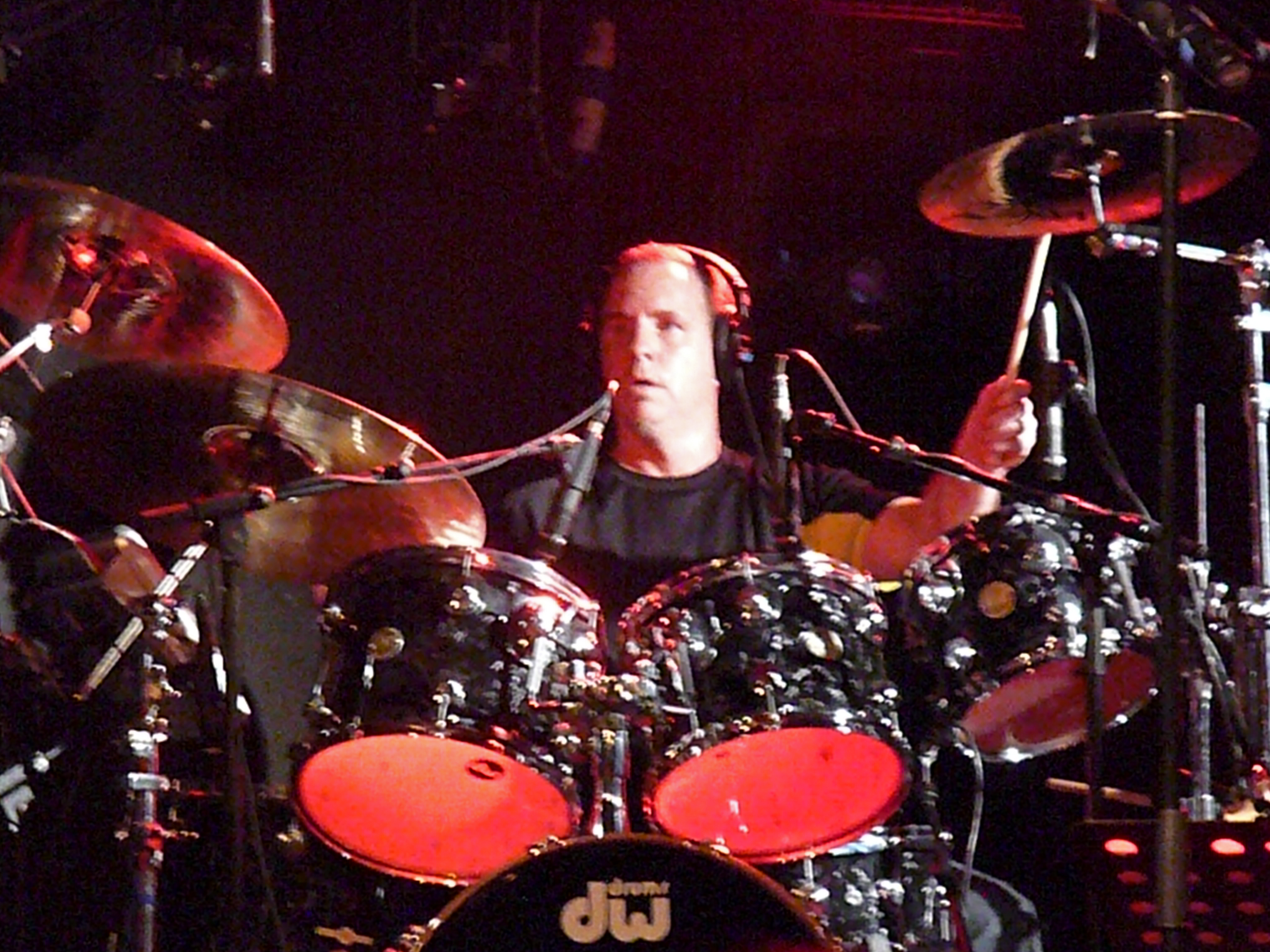

Background information
- Born: Christopher Scott Connor; July 14, 1960 (age 65)
- Genres: Progressive rock
- Years active: 1980–present

Christopher “Scott” Connor (born July 14, 1960) is an American drummer, percussionist and vocalist.

Specializing in drums and percussion, Connor is based out of the Southern California area. His specialties are rock, contemporary and progressive rock music. He is a veteran of the Los Angeles music club scene and has toured in the United States as well as Europe with super group Yoso (with Billy Sherwood, Bobby Kimball and Tony Kaye). Connor was the drummer for actor William Shatner's 2013 record Ponder the Mystery. He is currently a member of CIRCA: with Sherwood, Kaye and Ricky Tierney.
