= Sonic Elements =

- Origin: Los Angeles, California, United States
- Genres: Progressive rock
- Years active: 2011–present
- Members: Dave Kerzner
- Website: www.sonicelements.com

Sonic Elements is a unique American progressive rock project formed in Los Angeles, California, in 2011. Led by musician and sound producer Dave Kerzner, Sonic Elements is a new type of "fantasy rock tribute band" where some of the elements are authentic parts of the original music, whether it is one of the original musicians from the band or vintage instrument sounds recorded by the original recording engineer/producers. Sonic Elements takes samples produced by the sound design company Sonic Reality Inc and puts them into musical context, creating a virtual "super group" per song that combines different musicians with Sonic Reality sampled drummers and more.

Featured guest musicians include Billy Sherwood (Yes, Circa), Francis Dunnery (It Bites, Robert Plant), Rik Emmett (Triumph), John Wesley (Porcupine Tree), Nick D'Virgilio (Spock's Beard, Genesis) and other singers and guitarists recording classic covers, mash ups and original songs made with the sampled grooves of drummers like Neil Peart (Rush), Terry Bozzio (UK), Bill Bruford (King Crimson), Jerry Marotta (Peter Gabriel), Danny Gottlieb (Pat Metheny Group), Rod Morgenstein (Dixie Dregs), Bob Siebenberg (Supertramp), Woody Woodmansey (David Bowie's Spiders From Mars) and other elements that are part of Sonic Reality sound products for musicians.

== Music ==
The first album release from Sonic Elements is what Kerzner terms a "Fantasy Band Tribute To Rush" since it features the sampled drum performance of legendary Rush drummer Neil Peart. The album includes a cover of the song Red Barchetta which combines the members of two Canadian Rock Trios in one song for the first time, the drum sounds and performance of Neil Peart with guitar and vocals from Rik Emmett of Triumph. Coinciding with the release of Sonic Reality's sample library Neil Peart Drums Vol. 2: The Grooves, the unique Rush tribute album shows Sonic Reality's Neil Peart Drums sampled drums in musical context. Musicians are able to use the same signature Rush drum grooves in their own music whether doing covers or original songs.

Kerzner and Sonic Elements are working on several other tribute and original music albums including a symphonic rock version of Genesis' "The Lamb Lies Down On Broadway" done in a film soundtrack style, Pink Floyd's "Dark Side of the Moon" done with Alan Parsons and a variety of guest musicians, a tribute to the music of Yes done with ex-Yes member Billy Sherwood as well as other music projects which have advanced audio clips on SoundCloud

Kerzner and Sonic Elements are also working on a secret tribute album done with a unique twist. It features Martin Levac on vocals and drums and uses instrument samples recorded at Genesis' recording studio The Farm by producer/engineers Hugh Padgham and Nick Davis.

== Interviews ==
Exploring behind the scenes secrets and the story of classic albums and modern music production Dave Kerzner interviews modern, progressive and classic rock artists, producers and engineers such as Steven Wilson, Keith Emerson, Alan Parsons and Billy Sherwood
