= Yes 50 Live =

Live album by Yes
- Released: 2 August 2019
- Recorded: 20–21 July 2018
- Venue: The Fillmore Philadelphia, Philadelphia, PA
- Genre: Progressive rock
- Length: 112:24
- Label: Rhino
- Producer: Yes

Yes chronology
The Steven Wilson Remixes (2018)	Yes 50 Live (2019)	From a Page (2019)

Yes 50 Live is a double live album by English progressive rock band Yes, released on 2 August 2019 by Rhino Records.

== Background ==
Yes reached their fiftieth anniversary year in 2018. To commemorate the milestone, the band—consisting of guitarist Steve Howe, drummer Alan White, bassist Billy Sherwood, keyboardist Geoff Downes, and lead vocalist Jon Davison—completed the 50th Anniversary Tour across Europe and the United States between March and July 2018. The five were joined by American drummer Jay Schellen, who performed the majority of Yes's live sets since 2016 while White recovered from surgery and a bacterial infection that affected his playing. The tour's set list included songs that spanned most of the group's history, from Time and a Word (1970), their second album, to Fly from Here (2011), their twentieth album.

== Recording ==
Yes 50 Live was recorded on 20 and 21 July 2018 at The Fillmore Philadelphia in Philadelphia, Pennsylvania during the North American leg of the tour. It features the majority of the set list performed on the two nights. This particular leg featured guest performances from former keyboardists Tony Kaye and Patrick Moraz; Kaye joined the group for the encores ("Yours Is No Disgrace", "Roundabout", and "Starship Trooper") and Moraz plays on "Soon", the closing section to "The Gates of Delirium".

Sherwood, who has produced and mixed several Yes albums, reprises his role as the mixer on this album.

== Release ==
The album was available as a 2-CD and 4-LP set, along with a colored vinyl pressing limited to 1,200 copies.

== Critical reception ==
Professional ratings
Review scores
Source	Rating
AllMusic	3/5 stars

Stephen Thomas Erlewine of AllMusic gave the album three out of five stars and noted that it "adheres most closely to the prog rock that made their name in the early '70s" and that the current incarnation of the band "does this sound justice, which makes the album precisely what it's intended to be: a celebration of a particular time and sound, delivered with affection and skill".

== Track listing ==
Disc one
No.	Title	Writer(s)	Length
1.	"Close to the Edge": I. "The Solid Time of Change"; II. "Total Mass Retain"; III. "I Get Up, I Get Down"; IV. "Seasons of Man"	Jon Anderson, Steve Howe	19:06
2.	"Nine Voices (Longwalker)"	Anderson, Howe, Billy Sherwood, Chris Squire, Alan White, Igor Khoroshev	3:52
3.	"Sweet Dreams"	Anderson, David Foster	5:26
4.	"Madrigal"	Anderson, Rick Wakeman	2:53
5.	"We Can Fly from Here, Pt. 1"	Trevor Horn, Geoff Downes, Squire	5:58
6.	"Soon"	Anderson, Squire, Howe, White, Patrick Moraz	8:00
7.	"Awaken"	Anderson, Howe	18:19

Disc two
No.	Title	Writer(s)	Length
1.	"Parallels"	Squire	6:17
2.	"Excerpt from 'The Ancient'"	Anderson, Howe, Squire, Wakeman, White	5:18
3.	"Yours Is No Disgrace"	Anderson, Squire, Howe, Tony Kaye, Bill Bruford	12:07
4.	"Excerpt from 'Georgia's Song' and 'Mood for a Day'"	Howe	4:01
5.	"Roundabout"	Anderson, Howe	9:25
6.	"Starship Trooper": a. "Life Seeker"; b. "Disillusion"; c. "Würm"	Anderson, Squire, Howe	11:42

== Personnel ==
Yes

- Steve Howe – guitars, backing vocals, production
- Alan White – drums, percussion, production
- Geoff Downes – keyboards, production
- Billy Sherwood – bass guitar, backing vocals, production, mixing
- Jon Davison – lead vocals, acoustic guitar, percussion, production

with

- Jay Schellen – additional drums, percussion
- Tony Kaye – keyboards on "Yours Is No Disgrace", "Roundabout", and "Starship Trooper"
- Patrick Moraz – keyboards on "Soon"

Production

- Dean Mattson – recording
- Maor Appelbaum – mastering
- Roger Dean – painting, design, cover
- Douglas Gottlieb – photography, design
- Glenn Gottlieb – photography, design
- Daniel Earnshaw – product manager

== Charts ==
The album made #34 in the UK midweek album chart.

Chart (2019)	Peak position
Belgian Albums (Ultratop Wallonia)	75
German Albums (Offizielle Top 100)	62
Hungarian Albums (MAHASZ)	19
Italian Albums (FIMI)	83
Japanese Albums (Oricon)	91
Scottish Albums (OCC)	19
Spanish Albums (PROMUSICAE)	80
Swiss Albums (Schweizer Hitparade)	84
UK Progressive Albums (OCC)	3
