= Topographic Drama – Live Across America =

Live album by Yes
- Released: 24 November 2017
- Recorded: February 2017
- Venue: Various Venues Across America, February 2017
- Genre: Progressive rock
- Length: 136:44
- Label: Rhino
- Producer: Yes

Yes chronology
Like It Is: Yes at the Mesa Arts Center (2015)	Topographic Drama – Live Across America (2017)	Fly From Here – Return Trip (2018)

Topographic Drama – Live Across America is a double live album by English progressive rock band Yes, released on 24 November 2017 by Rhino Records.

It is the first Yes release following the death of founding bassist Chris Squire, and by extension, the first release with no original members. He was replaced by American multi-instrumentalist Billy Sherwood, making this album his first release with the band since 2000's House of Yes: Live from House of Blues.

It was recorded in February 2017 in several locations across the United States during their 2016–2017 world tour that featured Drama (1980) played in its entirety, plus half of their double album Tales from Topographic Oceans (1973).

== Background and album ==
In March 2013, the Yes line-up of bassist Chris Squire, guitarist Steve Howe, drummer Alan White, keyboardist Geoff Downes, and singer Jon Davison kicked off their first tour with a live set formed of select past studio albums performed in their entirety and in track order. The idea came about in the second half of 2012 when the group discussed their future touring plans; Howe felt playing a selection of songs from their history had run its course and suggested one with a specific concept, one that was discussed for several years prior, but was not materialised.

The album documents Yes on the final leg of their world tour that ran between July 2016 and February 2017 that saw the band continue with their album-themed tours. It was recorded in various locations across the United States in February 2017. White sat out for most of the tour to recover from back surgery and was replaced with Jay Schellen, before White returned on the drums on a part-time basis in time for the Japanese leg in November 2016. Schellen continued to play with the band on most shows for the remainder of the tour.

The tour's set included Drama (1980) played in its entirety and in track order with "The Revealing Science of God (Dance of the Dawn)" and "Ritual (Nous Sommes du Soleil)" which forms half of their double album Tales from Topographic Oceans (1973). In addition, it featured performances of "Leaves of Green", an excerpt of "The Ancient (Giants Under the Sun)" from Tales from Topographic Oceans, "And You and I" from Close to the Edge (1972), "Heart of the Sunrise" and "Roundabout" from Fragile (1971), and "Starship Trooper" from The Yes Album (1971).

Topographic Drama was first announced in early September 2017 in conjunction with the band's announcement of their 2018 European tour in celebration of their fiftieth anniversary. They revealed the album was "on its way", and officially announced the album on 28 September. Its artwork was designed and illustrated by Yes's longtime cover designer Roger Dean.

== Release ==
The album was released on 24 November 2017, available in 2-CD, 3-LP, and digital versions.

== Track listing ==
Disc one
No.	Title	Writer(s)	Length
1.	"Machine Messiah"	Geoff Downes, Trevor Horn, Steve Howe, Chris Squire, Alan White	11:17
2.	"White Car"	Downes, Horn, Howe, Squire, White	1:25
3.	"Does It Really Happen?"	Downes, Horn, Howe, Squire, White	7:22
4.	"Into the Lens"	Downes, Horn, Howe, Squire, White	9:11
5.	"Run Through the Light"	Downes, Horn, Howe, Squire, White	5:08
6.	"Tempus Fugit"	Downes, Horn, Howe, Squire, White	5:58
7.	"And You and I": I. "Cord of Life"; II. "Eclipse"; III. "The Preacher, the Teacher"; IV. "Apocalypse"	Jon Anderson; themes by Bill Bruford, Howe, Squire	11:24
8.	"Heart of the Sunrise"	Anderson, Squire, Bruford	12:14

Disc two
No.	Title	Writer(s)	Length
1.	"The Revealing Science of God (Dance of the Dawn)"	Anderson, Howe, Squire, Rick Wakeman, White	21:57
2.	"Leaves of Green"	Anderson, Howe, Squire, Wakeman, White	6:04
3.	"Ritual (Nous sommes du soleil)"	Anderson, Howe, Squire, Wakeman, White	24:39
4.	"Roundabout"	Anderson, Howe	8:35
5.	"Starship Trooper": a. "Life Seeker"; b. "Disillusion"; c. "Würm"	Anderson, Howe, Squire	11:45

== Personnel ==
Yes

- Jon Davison – lead vocals, acoustic guitar, percussion
- Steve Howe – guitars, backing vocals
- Billy Sherwood – bass guitar, backing vocals, harmonica, mixing
- Geoff Downes – keyboards
- Alan White – drums, percussion

with

- Jay Schellen – additional drums, percussion

Production

- Billy Sherwood – mixing
- Maor Appelbaum – Mastering Engineer
- Roger Dean – cover painting, cover design, logos
- Douglas Gottlieb & Glenn Gottlieb (Gottlieb Bros.) – photography, package design
- Jerry and Lois Photography – additional photography

== Charts ==
Chart (2017)	Peak position
Scottish Albums (OCC)	94
UK Rock & Metal Albums (OCC)	8

Chart (2019)	Peak position
Spanish Albums (PROMUSICAE)	91
