= Billy Sherwood =

American musician (born 1965)

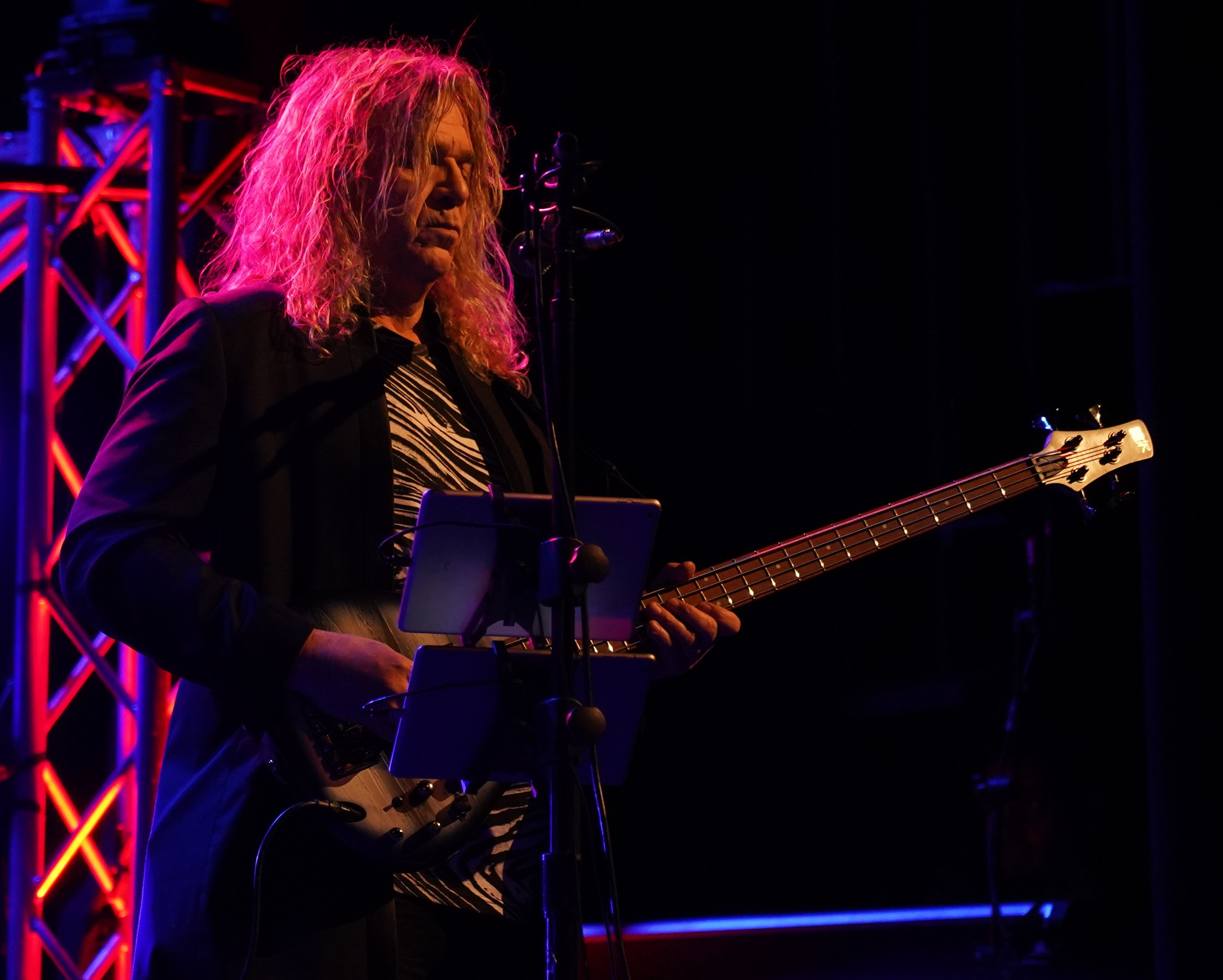
- Sherwood in 2024

Background information
- Born: William Wyman Sherwood; March 14, 1965 (age 61); Las Vegas, Nevada, U.S.
- Genres: Progressive rock; hard rock; pop rock
- Occupations: Musician; engineer; producer; singer-songwriter; multi-instrumentalist
- Instruments: Bass guitar; vocals; guitar; keyboards; drums
- Years active: 1980–present
- Labels: Frontiers; Cleopatra; Cherry Red
- Member of: Yes; Circa; The Prog Collective
- Formerly of: Lodgic; World Trade; Conspiracy; Air Supply; Yoso; Asia; Nektar; Mabel Greer's Toyshop; Arc of Life

William Wyman Sherwood (born March 14, 1965) is an American multi-instrumentalist, songwriter, singer, record producer and mixing engineer. He is best known as the current bassist and backing vocalist in English progressive rock band Yes (following the death of original bassist Chris Squire in 2015), and previously played guitar and keyboards with the band as a touring member in 1994 and as a full member from 1997 to 2000. He is also known for working with former and current Yes members on other projects such as Arc of Life, Circa and Yoso.

In addition to his involvement with Yes, Sherwood has been the frontman of progressive rock groups World Trade and Lodgic. In 2017, he toured as lead singer for Asia after the death of original singer and bassist John Wetton. Outside of these bands, Sherwood has worked as a producer since the 1990s, most notably on tribute albums dedicated to Pink Floyd, The Beatles, Queen and many others. He is also a solo artist, having released ten studio albums to date.

== Personal life ==
Sherwood was born on March 14, 1965, in Las Vegas, Nevada. He was born into a musical family; his father Bobby Sherwood was an actor, musician, and big band leader and his mother Phyllis is a former singer and drummer. His brother Michael was a singer and keyboardist. Sherwood's godfather was comedian Milton Berle. As a teenager, Sherwood moved to Los Angeles with his mother (following his parents' divorce) and by the age of sixteen had established himself as a drummer. He would subsequently move to bass guitar at the urging of future Lodgic collaborator Jimmy Haun, subsequently becoming skilled at guitar, keyboards and singing, as well as learning engineering and production.

Sherwood currently divides his time between homes in London and Las Vegas, with his recording studio being based in Las Vegas.

== Career ==
=== Lodgic and World Trade (1980–1989, 2017) ===
Sherwood's music career started when his brother Michael's band Lodgic moved from Las Vegas to Los Angeles in 1980. Initially helping out with administration, Billy would eventually become Lodgic's bass guitarist and singer, while Michael played keyboards and sang back up. Lodgic also included Guy Allison on keyboards, Jimmy Haun on guitar and Gary Starns on drums. After many years of trying to get things together, they recorded their debut album Nomadic Sands, released in 1985.

After Lodgic broke up, Sherwood put together a new band with Guy Allison. They recruited guitarist Bruce Gowdy and drummer Mark T. Williams to form World Trade. They recorded their self-titled debut in 1989, with Sherwood taking on the roles of engineer, mixer, and producer again, along with his band duties as bassist and lead singer. Sherwood subsequently got back together with his bandmates from World Trade and released Euphoria in 1995 (with Jay Schellen replacing Williams on drums) before a second hiatus. In 2017, Sherwood would reunite with World Trade for a third time to record a third album titled Unify, which was released on August 4, 2017.

=== Yes (1989, 1994, 1997–2000, 2015–present) ===
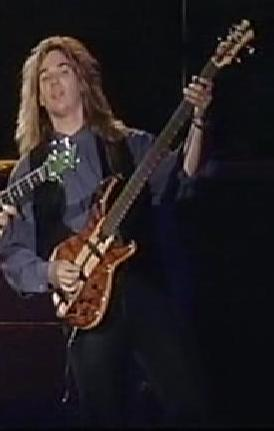
Sherwood in 1994

In 1989, Yes had suffered a setback when singer Jon Anderson had left to form Anderson Bruford Wakeman Howe (ABWH), with the band now looking for a replacement lead singer. Sherwood was invited to meet Yes bassist Chris Squire after singer and record executive Derek Shulman suggested him and played Squire some World Trade material. Sherwood was invited to jam with the remaining Yes members (Squire, guitarist Trevor Rabin, drummer Alan White, and keyboardist Tony Kaye). He eventually chose not to join Yes, initially due to prior loyalties towards World Trade and subsequently due to a (correct) suspicion that Yes and Anderson would reunite in the near future, leaving Sherwood himself potentially suffering "the end of my career, because I was the guy who failed at becoming the lead singer of Yes." However, he remained in the band circles as an associate, in particular via a new songwriter partnership with Squire, the result of a fast friendship that would lead to the two working together for the next twenty-five years.

Yes merged with the members of ABWH in 1990 to become an eight-man formation of Yes, which lasted until 1992. The two groups recorded songs for Union (1991), including the first song that Sherwood and Squire wrote together, "The More We Live – Let Go". Sherwood produced and played all instruments (apart from lead vocals and lead guitar) on the final version of the track appearing on Union. When Yes reverted to their five-man 90125-era line-up, Sherwood was recruited by the band in 1994 as a touring guest musician, playing addition guitar and keyboards (as well as singing back-up vocals) on their tour supporting Talk. These live dates would also see Sherwood playing a two-bass-guitar duet with Squire at the start of the song "Endless Dream".

Following another Yes line-up change (this time reverting to the mid/late 1970s line-up of Squire, Anderson, White, Rick Wakeman and Steve Howe), Sherwood remained close to the band, working as co-producer, engineer and mixer of the new studio tracks for their studio albums Keys to Ascension (1996) and Keys to Ascension 2 (1997). Following Wakeman's unexpected departure in 1997, the band became discouraged and dispersed: as Sherwood and Squire were continuing to write songs together and shared a desire for Yes to continue, the two developed material which quickly developed into the next Yes studio album, 1997's Open Your Eyes (gradually pulling in the other members of the band as recording and writing progressed). Sherwood played almost all of the keyboard and backing guitar tracks on the album as well as writing and producing, which meant that when tour dates were scheduled it was an easy choice for the band to finally hire him as a full-time member. With keyboard player Igor Khoroshev joining just before the tour commenced, Sherwood settled in as rhythm/backing guitarist and harmony singer. This line-up, including Sherwood, wrote and recorded a subsequent Yes album, The Ladder, in 1999.

In 2000, following the tour supporting The Ladder, Sherwood left Yes (with a live album and DVD recorded at the House of Blues in his hometown of Las Vegas, House of Yes: Live from House of Blues, serving as the final record of this particular Sherwood stint in the band). Sherwood would later state that his intent had been to move Yes into the twenty-first century with new material and approaches; and that he had amicably resigned once he realised that the band now intended to mostly tour and perform back catalogue material, an area in which he felt he was less interested and had little to offer.

On May 19, 2015, it was announced that Squire would be undergoing treatment for acute erythroid leukemia, and that Yes would continue their 2015 North American tour with Sherwood filling in for him as Yes bassist. Following Squire's death on June 27 2015, Sherwood (along with other former and current members of Yes) made a public statement expressing his grief. At the same time, it was confirmed that Sherwood had been Squire's hand-picked choice as his permanent successor in Yes. Regarding this, Sherwood commented "Chris said to me, 'play the music, be yourself and make me proud'. It's my true desire now [to] live up to his wishes." Sherwood has subsequently written and recorded for three further Yes studio albums – The Quest (2021), Mirror to the Sky (2023), and Aurora (2026).

=== Conspiracy (1990–2003) ===
After his departure from Yes, Sherwood worked with Squire to release the album Conspiracy, which includes some work they composed together some years before.

In 2003, Sherwood released The Unknown, another album with Squire as Conspiracy.

More recently, Sherwood has been working on further tribute albums, notably Back Against the Wall and Return to the Dark Side of the Moon, tributes to Pink Floyd's The Wall and The Dark Side of the Moon respectively. The latter includes a new track recorded with Tony Kaye.

=== Circa and Yoso (2007–2016) ===
In 2007, a new band with Sherwood, Alan White, Tony Kaye and Jimmy Haun was announced, called Circa. With the release of their debut album Circa 2007 and a live DVD concert, Circa has played various live dates. White left the band and was replaced by Jay Schellen.

On January 14, 2009, Circa self-released on the Internet its second studio album, Circa HQ. This time, White was not available due to his commitments with Yes (who had begun a new tour). Sherwood's long time friend, collaborator and drummer, Jay Schellen, replaced White on the album. After a short international tour, Sherwood and co. started another project with former Toto singer, Bobby Kimball. Kimball, Sherwood, Tony Kaye and Jimmy Haun formed new band, Yoso, with a debut studio album in April 2009. Haun later abandoned the line-up (in order to focus on his work for adverts). He was replaced by Yes tribute band guitarist, Johnny Bruhns. Schellen chose to focus on his work in Asia Featuring John Payne and, after a number of other drummers, the band toured with Scott Connor on drums. Yoso then disbanded.

In 2011, Circa returned with a new line-up of Sherwood, Kaye, Bruhns and Connor, while Sherwood released his fifth solo album, What was the Question?. In 2012, Sherwood wrote, produced, arranged and performed on The Prog Collective, an album featuring vocal or instrumental contributions from many of the progressive rock artists he had worked with over the years. He reprised the concept with a similar collection of artists for Epilogue, released in 2013.

On October 8, 2013, they released the official video to William Shatner's record Ponder The Mystery, followed by a sold-out tour with Circa. Ponder The Mystery also features appearances of Steve Vai, Robby Krieger, Al Di Meola, George Duke, Vince Gill, Dave Koz, Rick Wakeman and Edgar Winter.

On July 8, 2016, Sherwood re-grouped with Circa to release their fourth album titled Valley Of The Windmill.

=== Other projects ===
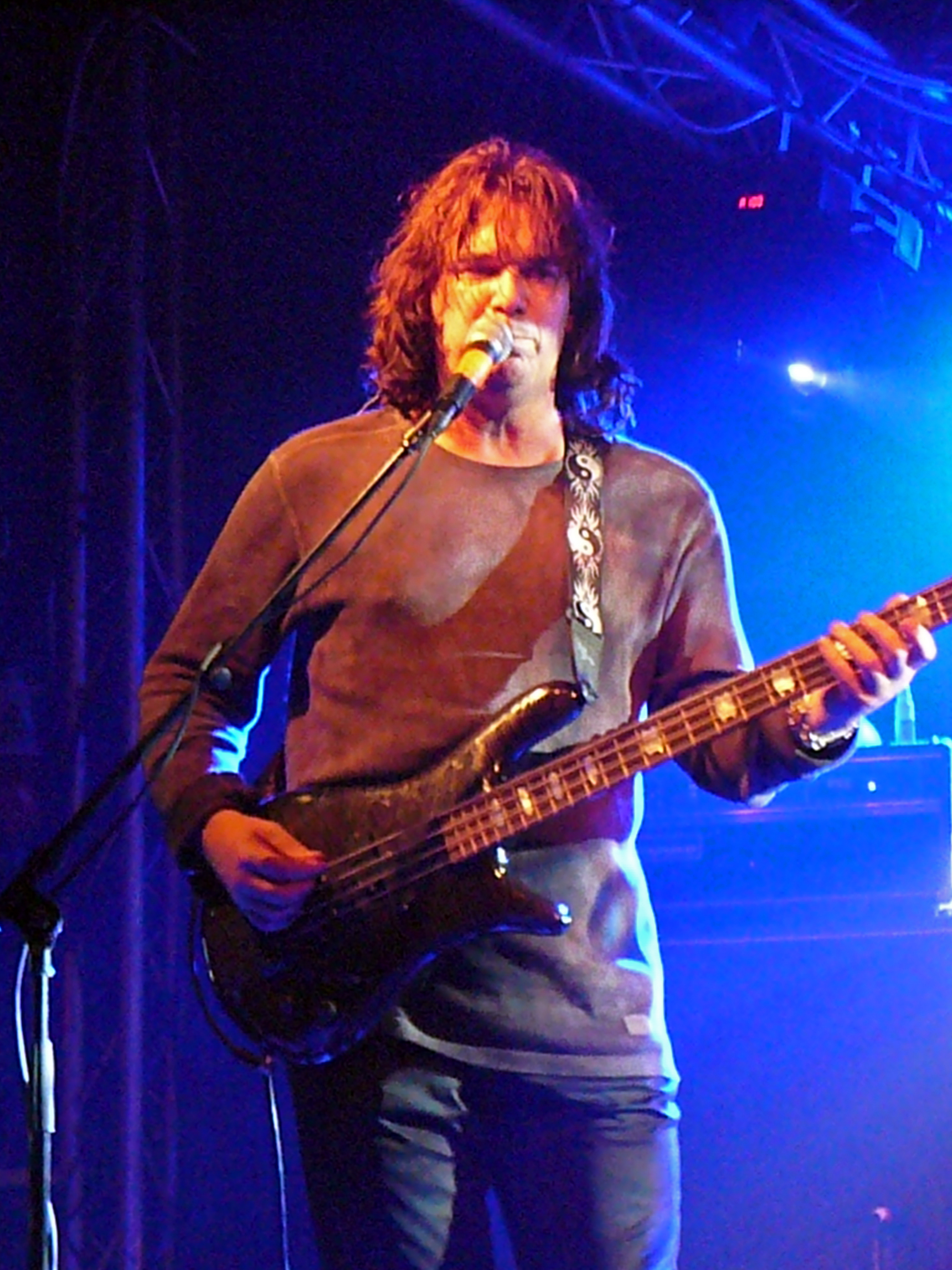
Sherwood performing in 2010

During the hiatus of Yes, Squire put together the Chris Squire Experiment, having Sherwood as co-lead singer while playing some guitar and keyboards. Sherwood then went on to record a project called The Key with guitarist Marty Walsh, though they would not release the album until 1997.

Behind the board, Sherwood worked with Motörhead, Dangerous Toys, and Paul Rodgers (formerly of Free and Bad Company) as producer and engineer. Sherwood also guested on Toto's Kingdom of Desire album, singing and playing bass. He also produced a couple of tribute albums, including Jeffology, a tribute to Jeff Beck. Sherwood then joined Yes on tour as an additional musician, playing guitar and keyboards for their tour in support of Talk.

Sherwood appeared along with William Shatner in the Season 14 premiere of Hell's Kitchen where they met blue team as part of their reward for winning the signature dish challenge.

Sherwood is also credited for writing the theme song for the online anime series, Kung Fu Jimmy Chow.

Sherwood worked as producer, mixer and engineer, including on more tribute albums: Dragon Attack, a tribute to Queen; Salute to AC/DC; and Crossfire, a tribute to Stevie Ray Vaughan.

On 11 January 2017, Asia announced that Sherwood would be filling in on bass and lead vocals for John Wetton for tour dates in the spring of 2017 while Wetton underwent chemotherapy, having been chosen by Wetton himself. Wetton died on 31 January 2017 and the tour went forward with Sherwood. In 2019, Asia's line-up changed with Ron "Bumblefoot" Thal joining on guitar and lead vocals and Sherwood remaining on just bass and backing vocals.

In May 2019, Sherwood and his partner Elisa Furr, along with Jay Schellen, Guy Allison and John Thomas (who has worked with Vixen) formed a new band together featuring Furr on vocals.

In July 2020, fellow Yes member Jon Davison announced a new side project with himself, Sherwood and Schellen called Arc of Life. He also said they had completed an album that would be released late 2020 or early 2021. In early 2021, Dave Kerzner revealed the rest of the band as himself and Jimmy Haun. The album was released on February 12, 2021.

=== Solo career ===
In 1999, Sherwood composed his first solo album called The Big Peace in which he played most of the instruments and also produced. The album was intended to be a back-to-basics of his progressive roots.

In August 2008, Sherwood released his third solo album, At the Speed of Life, for which he received an award as the best Progressive Rock Producer.

On May 20, 2019, it was announced that Sherwood was working on his tenth and latest solo album, titled Citizen: In The Next Life, which was released on July 12, 2019.

== Equipment ==
Sherwood mainly plays Carvin guitars, 6- and 12-string; his main guitar, which he's played since his first stint in Yes, is a red Carvin, Telecaster-shaped, with a Roland V-guitar pickup. His acoustic guitars are made by Babicz. He uses Line 6 amplifiers with 4x12" cabinets.

As a bassist, Sherwood was known for years for playing Spector basses through Tech-21 amps with 2-4X12" cabinets. In 2022, he was seen playing Ibanez basses in addition to his Spector instruments, and completely switched over by 2023. He has also played Kubicki, Tobias, Fender and Turner basses in the past.

Sherwood plays Rotosound Swing Bass 66 RS66LD bass strings, the same strings favored by Chris Squire and were an integral element of his bass tone.

== Discography ==
Solo albums

- The Big Peace (1999)
- No Comment (2003)
- At the Speed of Life (2008)
- Oneirology (2010)
- What Was the Question? (2011)
- The Art of Survival (2012)
- Divided by One (2014)
- Collection (2015), compilation with two exclusive tracks
- Archived (2015), album sold at Yes concerts during their 2015 tour, availability on Sherwood's website in 2016
- Citizen (2015)
- Citizen: In the Next Life (2019)

With World Trade

- World Trade (1989)
- Euphoria (1995)
- Unify (2017)

With Lodgic

- Nomadic Sands (1985)

With Yes

- Open Your Eyes (1997)
- The Ladder (1999)
- House of Yes: Live from House of Blues (2000)
- Topographic Drama – Live Across America (2017)
- Yes 50 Live (2019)
- The Royal Affair Tour: Live from Las Vegas (2020)
- The Quest (2021)
- Mirror to the Sky (2023)
- Aurora (2026)
- Various tasks (production, mixing, songwriting, various instruments) on Union (1991), Keys to Ascension (1996), Keys to Ascension 2 (1997), Heaven & Earth (2014), Like It Is: Yes at the Bristol Hippodrome (2014) and Like It Is: Yes at the Mesa Arts Center (2015)

With Conspiracy

- Conspiracy (2000)
- The Unknown (2003)
- Conspiracy Live (2006)

With Jim Ladd's Heatsets

- From Here To Infinity (2007) (also known as Rock Infinity)
- Chapter I: Alone Out There (2007)
- Chapter II: Sides (2009)

With Circa

- Circa 2007 (2007)
- Circa Live (2009, + DVD 2008)
- Circa HQ (2009)
- Overflow (2009)
- And So On (2011)
- Live From Here There & Everywhere (2013)
- Valley Of The Windmill (2016)

With the Prog Collective

- The Prog Collective (2012)
- Epilogue (2013)
- Worlds on Hold (2021)
- Songs We Were Taught (2022)
- Seeking Peace (2023)
- Dark Encounters (2024)

With Yoso

- Elements (2010)

With Mabel Greer's Toyshop

- New Way of Life (2014)
- The Secret (2017)

With Light Freedom Revival

- Eterniverse Deja Vu (2017)
- Truthonomy (2018)

With Arc of Life

- Arc of Life (2021)
- Don't Look Down (2022)

Solo production credits

- Back Against the Wall (2005)
- Return to the Dark Side of the Moon (2006)
- Songs of the Century: An All-Star Tribute to Supertramp (2012)

Other appearances

- Deep Purple – Slaves and Masters (1990)
- Yes – Yesyears (1991)
- Yes – Union (1991)
- Regulators – The Regulators (1991)
- Toto – Kingdom of Desire (1992)
- Motörhead – March ör Die (1992)
- Air Supply – The Vanishing Race (1993)
- Paul Rodgers – Muddy Water Blues: A Tribute to Muddy Waters (1993)
- Dangerous Toys – Pissed (1994)
- Various Artists – Supper's Ready (1995)
- Various Artists – The Moon Revisited (1995)
- Various Artists – Tales From Yesterday (1995)
- Pam Thum – Faithful (1995)
- Air Supply – News from Nowhere (1995)
- Yes – Keys to Ascension (1996)
- Def Leppard – All I Want Is Everything (1996)
- Various Artists – Crossfire: A Salute To Stevie Ray Vaughan (1996)
- Yes – Keys to Ascension (1997)
- Various Artists – Dragon Attack: A Tribute To Queen (1997)
- Paul Rodgers – Chronicle (1997)
- The Key – The World is Watching (1997)
- Treason – Treason (1997)
- Ratt – Collage (1997)
- Carmine Appice – Guitar Zeus (1997)
- Flambookey – Flambookey (1997)
- Various Artists – Thunderbolt-A Tribute To AC/DC (1998)
- Michael Sherwood – Tangletown (1998)
- Regulators – Bar & Grill (1998)
- Quiet Riot – Alive and Well (1999)
- Carmine Appice – Guitar Zeus: Japan (2000)
- Yes – Keystudio (2001)
- Fear Factory – Digimortal (2001)
- Carmine Appice – Guitar Zeus: Korea (2002)
- Jack Russell – For You (2002)
- Todd Rundgren – Todd Rundgren And His Friends (2002)
- Medwyn Goodall – Anam Cara
- Various Artists – Pigs & Pyramids-An All Star Lineup Performing The Songs of Pink Floyd (2002)
- Ignition – Ignition (2003)
- Various Artists – Bat Head Soup-A Tribute To Ozzy Osbourne (2003)
- Asia – Silent Nation (2004)
- John 5 – Vertigo (2004)
- Larry Klimas – Retro-Spec(t) (2004)
- Michael Schenker – Heavy Hitters (2005)
- Various Artists – Back Against The Wall (2005)
- Edgar Winter – The Better Deal (2006)
- Various Artists – Return to the Dark Side of the Moon (2006)
- Various Artists – An '80s Metal Tribute To Journey (2006)
- Various Artists – Lights Out: The Ultimate Tribute To UFO (2006)
- Various Artists – An All-Star Tribute To Lynyrd Skynyrd (2007)
- Graham Russell – The Future (2007)
- Hollywood Roses – Dopesnake (2007)
- Various Artists – 70's Box: The Sound Of A Decade (2007)
- Julie Francis – Lucky Penny (2008)
- Various Artists – Led Box: The Ultimate Tribute To Led Zeppelin (2008)
- Various Artists – Big Movies, Big Music Volume 1 (2008)
- Various Artists – Big Networks, Big Music Volume 2 (2008)
- Various Artists – Big Networks, Big Music Volume 9 (2008)
- Various Artists – Ultimate Holiday Party Volume 1 (2008)
- Various Artists – Ultimate Christmas Party Volume 2 (2008)
- Various Artists – Ultimate Christmas Party Volume 3 (2008)
- Various Artists – A Tribute To Thin Lizzy (2008)
- Various Artists – Abbey Road: A Tribute To The Beatles (2009)
- Eureka – Shackleton's Voyage (2009)
- Various Artists – An All-Star Salute to Christmas (2010)
- Nigel Briggs – Unwind (2010)
- Mars Hollow – World in Front of Me (2011)
- John Wetton – Raised in Captivity (2011)
- Flaming Row – Elinoire (2011)
- Michael Schenker Group – By Invitation Only
- Sonic Elements – XYZ—A Tribute to Rush (2012)
- Jay Tausig – Pisces (2012)
- Various Artists – Songs of the Century: An All-Star Tribute to Supertramp (2012)
- Various Artists – Black on Blues – A Tribute to The Black Keys (2012)
- The Fusion Syndicate – The Fusion Syndicate (2012)
- Edison's Lab – Edison's Lab EP (2012)
- Blackburner – Planet Earth Attack (2012)
- Nektar – A Spoonful of Time (2012)
- Nektar – Time Machine (2013)
- Days Between Stations – In Extremis (2013)
- Sons of Hippies – Griffones at the Gates of Heaven (2013)
- William Shatner – Ponder The Mystery (2013)
- Dale Bozzio/Missing Persons – Missing in Action (2014)
- Spirits Burning - Starhawk (2015)
- Leon Alvarado – The Future Left Behind (2016)
- Peter Banks - Be Well, Be Safe, Be Lucky... The Anthology (2018)
- John Holden - Capture Light (2018)
- David Cross and Peter Banks - Crossover (2020)
- John Holden - Rise and Fall (2020)
- Leon Alvarado – The Wicked Forest (2026)
