= Circa (band) =

Rock band

- Origin: California, U.S.
- Genres: Progressive rock
- Years active: 2006–present
- Labels: Cleopatra, Glassville
- Members: Tony Kaye; Billy Sherwood; Rick Tierney; Scott Connor
- Past members: Jimmy Haun; Alan White; Jay Schellen; Ronnie Ciago; Johnny Bruhns
- Website: www.facebook.com/circahq/

Circa (stylized as CIRCA:) is a progressive rock supergroup founded by four musicians associated with Yes: former Yes members Alan White (drums), and Tony Kaye (Hammond, keyboards), current Yes members Billy Sherwood (vocals, bass guitar) and Jay Schellen (drums), and guitarist Jimmy Haun, who played on the Yes album Union.

From 2012, the line-up consisted of Sherwood (vocals, guitar), Kaye (keyboards), Rick Tierney (bass guitar), and Scott Connor (drums).

== Biography ==
=== Origins ===
Jimmy Haun and Michael Sherwood (Billy's elder brother) were childhood friends and went on to form the band Lodgic, which Billy joined in 1981. A few years after Lodgic split up, Billy Sherwood was introduced to Yes bassist Chris Squire and other members of Yes, including Kaye and White. Sherwood worked with the band on material for their next album. Meanwhile, both Haun and Michael Sherwood came to do session work on the second album from the Yes spinoff band, Anderson Bruford Wakeman Howe. Material from both projects was combined for the 1991 album Union, which thus features Billy Sherwood on the track "The More We Live—Let Go" and Haun and Michael Sherwood on further tracks. Squire and Billy Sherwood had written a body of material not used on Union; subsequently, they briefly toured this under the name of The Chris Squire Experiment in 1992, with a line-up including White and Haun. (The Chris Squire Experiment later evolved into Conspiracy.)

Billy Sherwood continued an on/off association with Yes over the next few years, touring as a live musician for the Talk tour in 1994, with Jon Anderson, Trevor Rabin, Chris Squire, Alan White, and Tony Kaye. After this, in 1995, Sherwood and Rabin did some writing together, and two tracks on the Circa 2007 album are based on this material.

Billy Sherwood eventually joined Yes for a few years and two albums before leaving again. In the mid-2000s, he organised two Pink Floyd tribute albums, Back Against The Wall and Return To The Dark Side Of The Moon, and some further projects which featured an array of former and current Yes members as guests, including Kaye, White, Geoff Downes, Peter Banks, Bill Bruford, Steve Howe, and Rick Wakeman. Coming out of the second of these projects, Sherwood suggested to Kaye that they put together a project using former and current members of Yes. Going under a working title of Family or Family Project, various names were floated, and White and Banks were approached.

However, in 2006, as the project developed, Sherwood and Kaye decided to change tack and focus on creating a unitary band. They recruited Alan White on drums and Jimmy Haun on guitar and recorded their debut album. Circa was formally announced in March 2007.

=== Circa 2007 and touring ===
On 30 July 2007, the band self-released their nine-song debut album, Circa 2007, with guest appearances by Michael Sherwood and Cole Coleman. The album includes two tracks based on material Billy Sherwood co-wrote with Trevor Rabin in 1995. A two-track download-only EP was previously available for a short period in the United States.

The band's debut live show was on August 23, 2007 in San Juan Capistrano, with a set including an extended instrumental medley of Yes tunes. A DVD of this show was released as Circa Live in February 2008. A few North American dates followed in early 2008, with Jay Schellen, a past collaborator of Sherwood's and Kaye's, filling in for White on one date.

=== Circa HQ and Yoso ===
In July 2008, Jay Schellen permanently replaced Alan White, who chose to focus on his work in Yes. The new line-up recorded an album, Circa HQ, in the latter half of 2008. The album was released on 14 January 2009. A short Italian tour with former Toto singer Bobby Kimball was announced for February 2009, playing a set consisting of music by Circa, Yes, and Toto. Kimball and Circa then joined to create a new band, Yoso (originally to be called AKA), although the Yoso line-up changed further until only Sherwood and Kaye from Circa were still members, joined by Johnny Bruhns on guitar and Scott Connor on drums.

=== And So On ===
Yoso disbanded in early 2011, and guitarist Bruhns moved to replace Haun in Circa. Haun had withdrawn to focus on his work providing music for commercials. Jay Schellen also departed, wanting to focus on work with Asia Featuring John Payne and Unruly Child. Connor was originally to take over on drums, but withdrew and Ronnie Ciago joined the band. On March 7, 2011, Michi Sherwood (Billy's wife) revealed the band's next album will be called And So On.

However, with western North American tour dates, Ciago left the band and Connor joined.

By 2012, Bruhns had departed from the band, leaving the group without a guitarist. Sherwood took this opportunity to switch to guitar and hired Rick Tierney (previously a touring musician with Alice Cooper and The Monkees) to take over on bass after hearing Tierney flawlessly perform basslines from Sherwood's solo discography.

In 2013, all of Circa's studio material and first live album was re-issued through Cleopatra Records. Circa also released a new live album, Live From Here There & Everywhere, on Glassville Records.

=== Valley of the Windmill ===
Circa's fourth album Valley of the Windmill, was released July 8, 2016 on Frontiers records. It includes several extended-length songs, and Sherwood describes it as "super proggy".

=== Possible fifth album ===
On April 15, 2019, Sherwood announced on his Facebook page that he and Tony Kaye are currently "chipping away at various musical ideas" for a fifth album.

== Personnel ==
=== Members ===
Current members

- Billy Sherwood – lead vocals (2006–present), guitars (2012–present), bass guitar (2006–2012)
- Tony Kaye – keyboards (2006–present)
- Scott Connor – drums, backing vocals (2010–2011, 2011–present)
- Rick Tierney – bass guitar, backing vocals (2012–present)

Former members

- Alan White – drums, backing vocals (2006–2008; died 2022)
- Jimmy Haun – guitars, backing vocals (2006–2010)
- Jay Schellen – drums (2008–2010)
- Ronnie Ciago – drums (2011)
- Johnny Bruhns – guitars, backing vocals (2011–2012; died 2025)

=== Line-ups ===
2006–2008	2008–2010	2010	2010
Billy Sherwood – vocals, bass; Jimmy Haun – guitar, backing vocals; Tony Kaye – keyboards, organ; Alan White – drums, backing vocals	Billy Sherwood – vocals, bass; Jimmy Haun – guitar, backing vocals; Tony Kaye – keyboards, organ; Jay Schellen – drums	Billy Sherwood – vocals, bass; Jimmy Haun – guitar, backing vocals; Tony Kaye – keyboards, organ; Scott Connor – drums, backing vocals	Billy Sherwood – vocals, bass; Tony Kaye – keyboards, organ; Scott Connor – drums, backing vocals; Johnny Bruhns – guitar, backing vocals
2011	2011–2012	2012–present	
Billy Sherwood – vocals, bass; Tony Kaye – keyboards, organ; Johnny Bruhns – guitar, backing vocals; Ronnie Ciago – drums	Billy Sherwood – vocals, bass; Tony Kaye – keyboards, organ; Johnny Bruhns – guitar, backing vocals; Scott Connor – drums, backing vocals	Billy Sherwood – vocals, guitar; Tony Kaye – keyboards, organ; Scott Connor – drums, backing vocals; Rick Tierney – bass, backing vocals	

== Discography ==
Studio albums

1. Circa 2007 (2007)
2. Circa HQ (2009)
3. And So On (2011)
4. Valley Of The Windmill (2016)

Live albums

1. Circa: Live (2008)
2. Live From Here There & Everywhere (2013)

Compilation albums

1. Overflow (2009) (a collection of leftovers from the first two Circa CDs)
