= The Quest (Yes album) =

Studio album by Yes
- Released: 1 October 2021
- Recorded: November 2019–March 2021
- Studios: Uncle Rehearsal Studios (Van Nuys, California); Curtis Schwartz Studio (Ardingly, West Sussex); FAMES Project Studio (orchestra) (Skopje, North Macedonia)
- Genre: Progressive rock
- Length: 47:49 (Original Album); 61:33 (Disc 2 Bonus)
- Labels: InsideOut Music; Sony Music
- Producer: Steve Howe

Yes chronology
The Royal Affair Tour: Live from Las Vegas (2020)	The Quest (2021)	Mirror to the Sky (2023)

Singles from The Quest
- 1. "The Ice Bridge" Released: 23 July 2021; 2. "Dare to Know" Released: 1 September 2021; 3. "Future Memories" Released: 15 October 2021; 4. "A Living Island" Released: 10 February 2022

The Quest is the twenty-second studio album by English progressive rock band Yes, released on 1 October 2021 by InsideOut Music and Sony Music. It is their first studio album featuring Billy Sherwood since The Ladder (1999), replacing bassist Chris Squire following his death in 2015, the first studio album without any original members, and their last to feature drummer Alan White before his death in 2022.

After completing touring commitments in July 2019, Yes began to collaborate on new material by exchanging ideas for songs online. The COVID-19 pandemic caused all touring to be cancelled in March 2020, which presented the opportunity for them to focus on the album during lockdown. When the songs had been arranged, the album was recorded in California and England and orchestral arrangements by Paul K. Joyce were performed by the FAMES Orchestra in North Macedonia. Frontman Jon Davison was the main lyricist, who wrote about various themes including hope, optimism, and environmental issues.

The Quest was released in various formats, including CD, LP, Blu-ray Disc, and on streaming platforms, and reached number 20 on the UK Albums Chart. It received generally positive reviews for Steve Howe's production and being considered an overall improvement over Yes' previous studio album Heaven & Earth (2014), though it received criticism for lacking unique or distinct songs.

== Background ==
In July 2019, the Yes line-up of Steve Howe, Alan White, Geoff Downes, Jon Davison, and Billy Sherwood, with second guest drummer Jay Schellen, finished their 28-date Royal Affair Tour, which saw the group headline a package tour across the U.S. that included performances from Asia, John Lodge, and Carl Palmer's ELP Legacy with Arthur Brown. Around this time, InsideOut Music co-founder Thomas Waber asked the band if they were ready to make a new studio album. Yes had planned to resume touring from March 2020, continuing their Album Series Tour with Relayer (1974) performed in its entirety, but it was rescheduled for 2021, and later to 2022, due to the COVID-19 pandemic and lockdown. The situation presented the opportunity for the band to work on a new album, their first since Heaven & Earth (2014). This marks the first Yes album to involve Sherwood as a musician (he had mixed Heaven and Earth) since The Ladder (1999), who replaced original bassist Chris Squire following his death in 2015, and the first without any founding members. It would also be the last Yes album released before drummer Alan White's death seven months after the album's release.

== Writing and recording ==
Yes began writing for the album in November 2019, one month before the outbreak of COVID-19, with the rest put together in the following year. Howe had become increasingly dissatisfied in recording with external producers who at times "didn't fully know what this band was", and put himself forward to produce the album, which was agreed upon. As the band were unable to get together, they developed songs by exchanging ideas online which were managed and stored at Curtis Schwartz Studio in Ardingly, West Sussex, owned by Curtis Schwartz, the album's engineer and mixer. Howe said there was "a lot of creativity" in the ideas that the band had presented, and wanted the album to be different from what Yes had done before. Davison wanted to support Howe in particular while making the album and "really let him shine". A typical scenario involved one member contributing an instrumental section for a track, which Davison would then take and develop vocal lines and lyrical ideas. Davison preferred writing in this way as it allowed him to work in his own studio at his own pace, as opposed to the pressure of working "on the clock" in a professional facility. Howe then sifted through what had been put down, suggesting parts that were to be developed or scrapped. Davison had no predetermined agenda with his lyrics, but he was inspired to write about life, one's destiny, and environmentalism, and noticed Howe had presented lyrical ideas on similar topics. Howe approached the writing process with caution, which he had also done for Fly from Here (2011) and Heaven & Earth, to ensure the songs were fully arranged and to every members' satisfaction prior to recording. "Dare to Know" was recorded during the period between 2019 and 2020, where members of Yes exchanged ideas remotely during the COVID-19 pandemic. By the end of 2019, Yes had put together "Damaged World" and "Future Memories".

The album was recorded in two main locations in 2020 and 2021; White and Sherwood put down their respective drum and bass parts first at Uncle Rehearsal Studios in Van Nuys, California, and Schellen contributed percussion. After sharing the recording files to the group online, and once COVID-19 restrictions began to ease, Davison travelled to England to join Downes and Howe at Curtis Schwartz Studio, where the album was completed. The Quest features orchestral arrangements that Howe said were to "augment and enhance the overall sound", after the idea of using one appealed to him. Downes felt the orchestra complemented his keyboard parts as opposed to being a "me versus them" situation. Yes had previously used an orchestra on two other studio albums, Time and a Word (1970) and Magnification (2001). The parts were written by English composer and arranger Paul Joyce, a longtime fan of the band who had produced orchestrations for Howe's solo album, Time (2012). Joyce arranged a full score for a 47-piece orchestra which was performed by the FAMES Studio Orchestra in Skopje, North Macedonia, with conductor Oleg Kondratenko. Schwartz and Howe mixed the album in March 2021.

InsideOut Music suggested that the album should not go over 45, 50 minutes, and the band selected eight tracks in the final running order. The label went on to suggest that a second disc of additional tracks recorded during the sessions be added, so Yes chose three songs that Howe said were "high-quality reserve tracks" and were not necessarily ones that they would have scrapped. He added that the two-disc configuration of The Quest "is not so much a double album", as the three tracks are "more like [...] a second part of the story."

== Songs ==
"The Ice Bridge" was first announced to have been written by Downes and Davison, and is formed of three sections. It originated from an idea Downes had, from which Davison developed lyrical and melody lines. The track begins in the key of C minor, which Howe said brings a "dark and moody" feel, and features sounds of ice breaking. Downes said the opening keyboard fanfare is one of his "signature bits" and was played as a homage to the band. The lyrics address the issue of climate change. On the following day of its release as a digital single, Downes addressed rumours that the song's riff was similar to "The Dawn of an Era" by English composer Francis Monkman. Downes originally clarified that "The Ice Bridge" originated from a 1977 showreel of his while composing jingles and library music for a West End music production company, and that he thought the song was worthy for further development by Yes. However, Downes mistakenly believed the composition was his own, as Monkman's track was put on the same tape. After the two got in contact, Monkman received a writing credit. The opening keyboard riff has been compared to "Fanfare for the Common Man" by Aaron Copland and adapted and played by Emerson, Lake & Palmer.

"Dare to Know" was recorded during the period between 2019 and 2020, where members of Yes exchanged ideas remotely during the COVID-19 pandemic. It features co-lead and harmonised vocals between Howe and Jon Davison. The song features an orchestral arrangement featuring an ascending brass refrain performed by Fame's Studio Orchestra, conducted by Oleg Kondratenko. At the time of the song's release, Howe said: "The centrepiece leaves the orchestra alone to elaborate and develop the way the theme is heard, then augments the closing minutes of the song as it rests, with an acoustic guitar cadenza."

"Minus the Man" concerns the search "for eternal consciousness through technology". "Leave Well Alone" features Howe playing a Japanese koto. "The Western Edge" features Davison sharing lead vocals with Sherwood, after he suggested they each devise a vocal part and combine the two tracks in the studio. Davison said this "accidental collaboration" produced a more unique result. Sherwood produced a demo of the track, after which Davison developed the melodies and lyrics.

"A Living Island" was inspired while Davison spent time during lockdown in Barbados, where he "really did some soul searching" on its lyrical message: "I felt the need to express in words all those intense thoughts and feelings and my personal perception of it all." Howe said the track is the only one about COVID-19 on the album, and said it concerns "two people grappling with the restrictions and the fears and dangers of the time." As the song progresses, the lyrics change from a personal standpoint to a wish for global wellbeing. Davison's vocals were recorded at his home set-up in Barbados, as the group felt the original takes were too strong and emotional to be re-recorded. The closing theme was something that Downes had worked on for some time before, and used a snippet of it on Halcyon Hymns (2021), an album by his side project, Downes Braide Association. He called it a "grandiose theme" that has "big major chords" in a similar style to Yes tracks "And You and I" and "Awaken", and thought it was a good way to close the album.

"Mystery Tour" pays homage to The Beatles and their influence on music and culture. "Damaged World" was the first song Yes collaborated on for the album in November 2019.

== Release ==
The Quest was announced on the band's official website, YesWorld, on 7 July 2021, revealing the track listing, artwork, and scheduled release date. The Quest was released in five different versions: a 2CD digipak, a limited edition deluxe box set containing 2LPs, 2CDs, and a Blu-ray Disc, a limited edition 2CD and Blu-ray Disc artbook, a gatefold sleeve LP and 2-CD set with a booklet, and on various digital platforms. "The Ice Bridge" was released as a digital single on 23 July 2021, including a YouTube video with lyrics and Dean's artwork. A similar-styled video accompanied the release of "Dare to Know" on 1 September 2021.

The album peaked at number 20 on its debut week on the UK Albums Chart.

== Reception ==
Professional ratings
Review scores
Source	Rating
Classic Rock	3/5 stars
Prog Radio	4.5/5 stars
The Spill Magazine	8/10
Uncut	7/10

Daniel Willis of RIFF magazine rated the album 6-out-of-10. He thought that while the album is a "master class in prog rock, it maintains the same sound across not just within itself but since the band's best-known hits" from the 1970s. He picked "The Ice Bridge", "Dare to Know", and "Mystery Tour" as distinct songs that stand out from the rest, which is "synth-heavy and cinematic, light on hooks and riffs, without choruses that will linger in your head". Geoff Bailie of The Prog Report said that the album "sounds like the work of a new lineup, with a new approach" and praised Howe's "beautifully rich guitar textures" throughout. He thought the three bonus tracks were songs that "don't really fit", but noted the sequencing made the album flow. Sonic Perspectives gave The Quest a rating of 8.4-out-of-10 which classified it as "Great". In his mixed review, Scott Medina ranked its production and musicianship as the strongest metrics, but lower scores for the songwriting and originality. He praised the decision to assign Howe as producer, though he said "more fire" in the writing would "catapult this from a decent effort to a great one". Despite this, Medina considered the album an improvement to Heaven & Earth.

Ultimate Classic Rock reviewer Michael Gallucci wrote that with The Quest, the band "dips into the nostalgia pool once again" and "goes through some familiar motions." Though he said the album "starts in the right place" with "The Ice Bridge" and "Dare to Know" sounding like "classic Yes", it begins to get "even more self-serious and metaphysical in its musings" with "Minus the Man" and "Future Memories". Gallucci summarised that the album is "backward-looking" and follows "a well-worn path", but praised the solos and in particular, "A Living Island". In a review for Classic Rock, Geoff Barton gave The Quest three stars out of five. He wrote that despite opening strong, the album "goes awry" as several tracks are suddenly punctuated by the orchestra before "just as soon fizzle out." The rest of the album "becomes ever more twee and unchallenging", with a lack of drama in the songs. Barton summarised the album as "a mixed bag". Glide magazine posted a mixed review by Andrew Kenney. He argued that Sherwood had proven to be a proficient replacement for Squire on stage, and his "running basslines and trebly undertones" provide a good basis for Howe and Downes to riff off each other. He praised White's "crisp, sharp" drumming and the vocal harmonies on "Minus the Man" despite the track being "a bit of a momentum killer". Kenney hailed "Leave Well Alone" as "a true Yes classic in the making" and "The Western Edge" a high point on the album, though despite "A Living Island" the least "Yes sounding" track it is also a strong moment. He thought the second disc lacked the "punch and quality" of the main set, but half of the album "deserve regular live rotation".

== Track listing ==
The Quest – CD 1
No.	Title	Writer(s)	Length
1.	"The Ice Bridge": I. "Eyes East"; II. "Race Against Time"; III. "Interaction"	Jon Davison, Francis Monkman, Geoff Downes	7:01
2.	"Dare to Know"	Steve Howe	6:00
3.	"Minus the Man"	Davison, Billy Sherwood	5:35
4.	"Leave Well Alone": I. "Across the Border"; II. "Not for Nothing"; III. "Wheels"	Howe	8:06
5.	"The Western Edge"	Davison, Sherwood	4:26
6.	"Future Memories"	Davison	5:08
7.	"Music to My Ears"	Howe	4:41
8.	"A Living Island": I. "Brave the Storm"; II. "Wake Up"; III. "We Will Remember"	Davison, Downes	6:52
Total length:			47:49

The Quest – CD 2 (Bonus disc)
No.	Title	Writer(s)	Length
9.	"Sister Sleeping Soul"	Davison, Howe	4:51
10.	"Mystery Tour"	Howe	3:33
11.	"Damaged World"	Howe	5:20
Total length:			13:44

== Personnel ==
Credits adapted from the albums' liner notes.

=== Yes ===
- Jon Davison – lead vocals (tracks 1, 3, 5, 6, 8–10), vocal duet (tracks 2, 4, 7, 11), Fender F-310-12 guitar (track 6)
- Steve Howe – guitars [Gibson 15 acoustic (track 1), Gibson Les Paul Roland (tracks 1, 8), Gibson Les Paul Junior and Gibson ES-157D (tracks 2) Gibson ES-175D (tracks 3, 11), Gibson ES-345 (track 3), Variax Sitar Guitar (track 1), Martin MC-28 acoustic (tracks 2, 5, 8, 10), Twelve-string acoustic (tracks 2, 7), Martin MC-38 SH acoustic (tracks 4, 7, 11), Martin 0018 'Nashville tuning' acoustic (track 11), Fender Stratocaster (tracks 2, 4), Fender Telecaster (tracks 3, 10), Telecaster volume and tone pedal rhythm guitar (track 7), Stringmaster steel (tracks 4–6), Portuguese 12 string guitar (track 9), Martin D-28 rhythm guitar (tracks 11), Steinberger GM4T (track 11), Sho Bud Pedal Steel guitars (track 11)], mandolin [Fender Electric mandolin (track 1), F4 mandolin (track 4)], koto and autoharp (track 4), vocal duet (tracks 2, 4, 7, 11), vocals (tracks 9, 10)
- Geoff Downes – piano (tracks 1, 4, 7, 8), Hammond organ (tracks 1, 2, 8, 10, 11), synthesizers (tracks 1, 3–5, 7, 9, 11), organ (tracks 4, 6), Mellotron (track 10), Fender Rhodes piano (track 10)
- Billy Sherwood – bass guitar [Spector (all tracks but 3, 6, 9), Spector fretless (tracks 6, 9), Rickenbacker 4001 (track 3)], vocals (tracks 5, 6, 10), Fender Rhodes piano (track 3), keyboards and acoustic guitar (track 5)
- Alan White – drums (tracks 1–5, 7–11)

=== Additional musicians ===
- Jay Schellen – percussion
- FAMES Studio Orchestra (tracks 2–4)
- Paul K. Joyce – orchestra arrangements
- Oleg Kondratenko – conductor (tracks 2–4)

=== Production ===
- Steve Howe – producer, preparatory engineering, guitar recording
- Curtis Schwartz – engineering, mixing, recording sessions photographies
- Simon Heyworth – mastering
- Geoff Downes – preparatory engineering, keyboards recording
- Jon Davison – preparatory engineering, vocals recording
- Billy Sherwood – preparatory engineering, basses recording, drums and percussion recording
- Alen Hadzi Stefanov – orchestra sound recordist
- Teodora Arsovska – orchestra Pro Tools operator
- Roger Dean – cover art, logo
- Doug Gottlieb, Glenn Gottlieb (The Gottlieb Brothers) – package design, Yes portraits
- Gigi White – recording sessions photographies

== Charts ==
Chart performance for The Quest
Chart (2021)	Peak position
Austrian Albums (Ö3 Austria)	14
Belgian Albums (Ultratop Flanders)	72
Belgian Albums (Ultratop Wallonia)	30
Dutch Albums (Album Top 100)	54
Finnish Albums (Suomen virallinen lista)	40
French Albums (SNEP)	85
German Albums (Offizielle Top 100)	7
Italian Albums (FIMI)	60
Japan Hot Albums (Billboard Japan)	51
Japanese Albums (Oricon)	46
Norwegian Albums (VG-lista)	38
Portuguese Albums (AFP)	44
Scottish Albums (Official Charts)	7
Spanish Albums (Promusicae)	62
Swiss Albums (Schweizer Hitparade)	5
UK Albums (Official Charts)	20
UK Progressive Albums (Official Charts)	1
UK Rock & Metal Albums (Official Charts)	1
US Top Album Sales (Billboard)	22
US Indie Store Album Sales (Billboard)	7
