= Unruly Child =

American band

- Origin: Los Angeles, California, U.S.
- Genre: AOR
- Years active: 1991–1992, 1998–2003, 2010–present
- Labels: Frontiers, Interscope
- Members: Bruce Gowdy; Guy Allison; Jay Schellen; Larry Antonino

Unruly Child is an American hard rock and AOR-band, founded in 1991, with Marcie Free on vocals.

Bruce Gowdy and Guy Allison previously worked together in the progressive rock band World Trade, while Jay Schellen would later join the group as well.

Free died on October 24, 2025, at the age of 71.

== Band members ==
=== Principal members ===
- Bruce Gowdy – guitar, bass, drums, keyboards, vocals (1991–1992, 1998–2003, 2010-present)
- Guy Allison – keyboards, bass, drums, percussion, vocals (1991–1992, 1998–2003, 2010-present)
- Jay Schellen – drums (1991–1992, 1998–2002, 2010-present)
- Larry Antonino – bass (1991–1992, 2010–present)

=== Former members ===
- Marcie Free – lead vocals (1991–1992, 2010–2025; her death)
- Kelly Hansen – lead vocals, guitar (1998–2002)
- Ricky Phillips – bass (1998–2002)
- Phillip Bardowell – lead vocals (2002–2003)

== Discography ==
=== Studio albums ===
- Unruly Child (1992)
- Tormented (1995) as Marcie Free
- Waiting for the Sun (1998)
- UCIII (2003)
- Worlds Collide (2010)
- Down the Rabbit Hole (2014)
- Can't Go Home (2017)
- Big Blue World (2019)
- Our Glass House (2020)

=== Live albums ===
- Unhinged Live from Milan (2018)

=== Compilation albums ===
- The Basement Demos (2002)

=== Singles ===
- "On the Rise" (1992)

=== Box sets ===
- Reigning Frogs – The Box Set Collection (2017)
