= Yoso =

American rock supergroup (2009–2011)

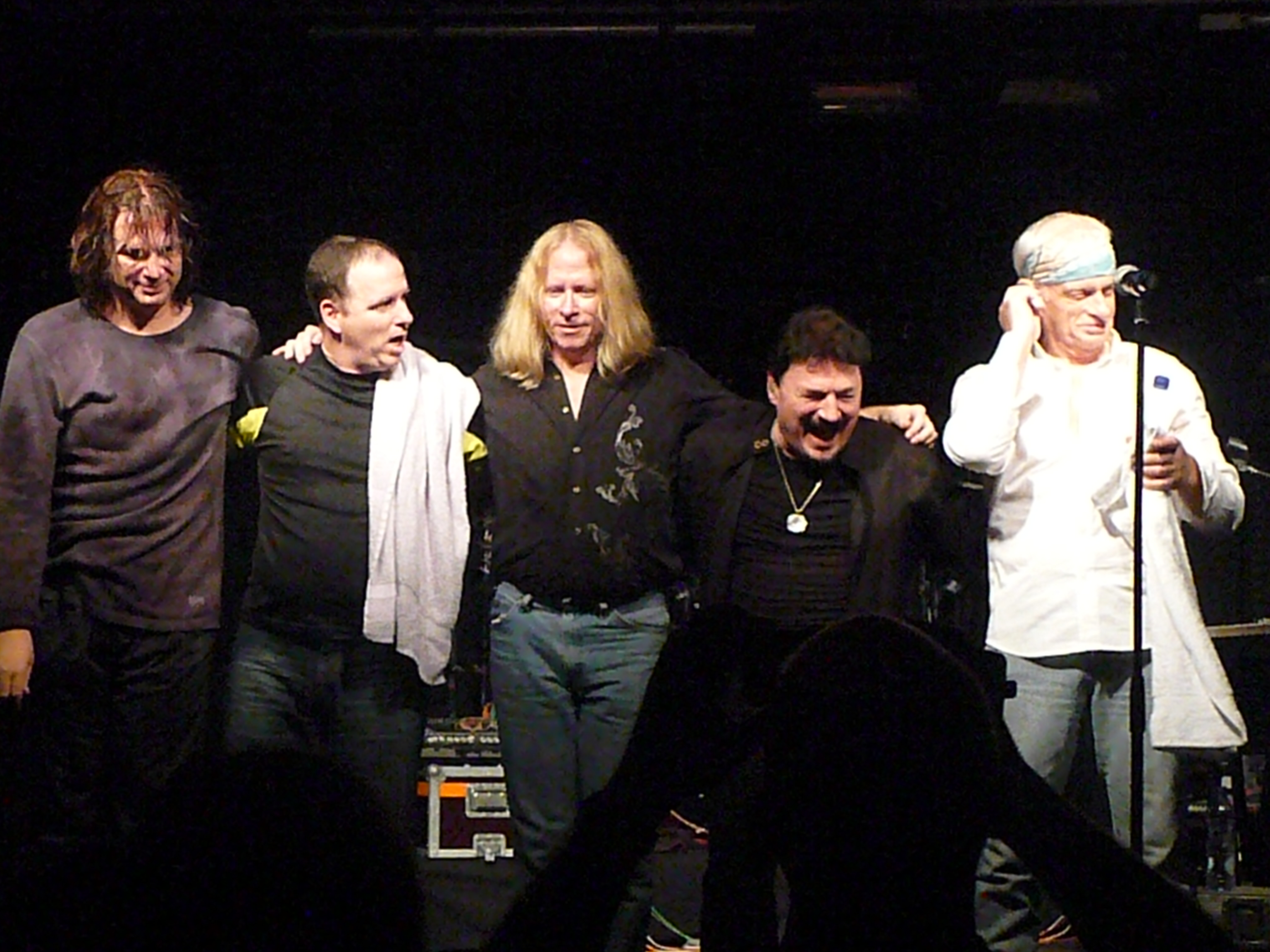
- Yoso in 2010. From left to right: Billy Sherwood, Scott Connor, Johnny Bruhns, Bobby Kimball, Tony Kaye

Background information
- Origin: California, U.S.
- Genres: Progressive rock
- Years active: 2009–2011
- Label: Frontiers
- Spinoff of: Circa
- Past members: Tony Kaye; Bobby Kimball; Billy Sherwood; Jimmy Haun; Jay Schellen; Lou Molino III; Jody Cortez; Johnny Bruhns; Scott Connor

Yoso was an American rock supergroup combining former members of Yes (Tony Kaye and Billy Sherwood) and Toto (Bobby Kimball). It was a spin-off from the group Circa.

== History ==
The band grew out of a plan for Kimball and Circa (consisting of Sherwood, Kaye, guitarist Jimmy Haun and drummer Jay Schellen) to play together on an Italian tour in early 2009. This was cancelled, but it was decided to form a new band with all five, announced under the name AKA; this was later changed to Yoso (a combination of Yes and Toto). With Schellen busy with other projects, he was replaced by Lou Molino III, who has worked previously with Sherwood and former Yes guitarist Trevor Rabin. An album was recorded in 2009.

The band played three Mexican dates in October 2009. In December, Sherwood announced the band would be moving forward with Jody Cortez on drums, and also that they had acquired Derek Shulman as their manager. Some live shows in early 2010 followed.

For touring in support of their only release, Elements, on Frontiers Records, released in July 2010, the band announced a new line-up. Joining Kimball, Sherwood and Kaye were drummer Scott Connor (of Genesis tribute band Gabble Ratchet) and guitarist Johnny Bruhns (of Yes tribute band Roundabout). In their live shows, the band played a mixture of classic Toto songs (mainly from the band's six times Grammy Award winning album Toto IV), classic Yes songs (mainly from 90125, on which Kaye performed) and material from their new album.

The band dissolved in 2011 and Bruhns joined Kaye and Sherwood in their other band Circa, once again replacing Jimmy Haun.

== Band members ==
- Tony Kaye – keyboards (2009–2011)
- Bobby Kimball – vocals (2009–2011)
- Billy Sherwood – bass, vocals (2009–2011)
- Jimmy Haun – guitars (2009–2010)
- Jay Schellen – drums (2009)
- Lou Molino III – drums (2009)
- Jody Cortez – drums (2009–2010)
- Johnny Bruhns – guitar (2010–2011; died 2025)
- Scott Connor – drums (2010–2011)

== Discography ==
- Elements (2010)
