= World Trade (band) =

American band

- Origin: United States
- Genres: Progressive rock
- Years active: 1989–1995, 2016–2017
- Labels: Polydor, Magna Carta, Frontiers
- Past members: Billy Sherwood; Bruce Gowdy; Guy Allison; Mark T. Williams; Jay Schellen
- Website: myspace.com/worldtradehq

World Trade was a U.S. progressive rock band that featured Billy Sherwood on bass and vocals, Bruce Gowdy on guitar, Guy Allison on keyboards, and Mark T. Williams and later Jay Schellen on drums. Yes's Chris Squire performed as a guest on their second album, Euphoria.

== History ==
The band was formed with Sherwood on lead vocals and bass, Gowdy on guitars, Guy Allison on keyboards and Mark T. Williams on drums. Sherwood and Allison had played together previously in Lodgic.

Their 1989 eponymous debut was co-produced by Keith Olsen. A second album followed in 1995 on Magna Carta Records, with Williams being replaced by Jay Schellen. The album was produced by Sherwood. The band's sound had similarities to 1980s Yes and the album included two Chris Squire Experiment tracks with Squire making uncredited contributions on backing vocals. Because of the similarity between the two bands, Sherwood and Gowdy briefly worked together with Yes after vocalist Jon Anderson and guitarist/vocalist Trevor Rabin left the band. However, both returned for the album Union before any material could be recorded with Sherwood and Gowdy.

Sherwood and Schellen also recorded tracks for a series of tribute albums by Magna Carta.

Sherwood has frequently collaborated with Schellen since, with both becoming members of Yes in 2015 and 2023 respectively. In the mid-2000s, Sherwood and Gowdy began work on a new World Trade album, but this was abandoned and material was planned on a release called Psy-Op.

After the group reunited in 2016, a third album was released in 2017 from Frontiers Records, titled Unify and featuring the original line-up of Sherwood, Gowdy, Allison, and Williams.

== Discography ==
=== Studio albums ===
- World Trade (1989)
- Euphoria (1995)
- Unify (2017)

=== Guest appearances ===
- Tales from Yesterday (1995), Yes tribute album
- Supper's Ready (1995), Genesis tribute album
- The Moon Revisited (1995), Pink Floyd tribute album

== Sources ==
- Billy Sherwood discography at Yescography
