= Michael Sherwood =

American musician (1959–2019)

- Born: October 27, 1959
- Died: November 5, 2019 (aged 60)
- Occupations: Musician; songwriter; composer; producer
- Instruments: Vocals; keyboards
- Years active: 1977–2019
- Formerly of: Lodgic; Conspiracy

Michael Sherwood (27 October 1959 – 5 November 2019) was an American keyboardist and singer.

== Biography ==
Michael Sherwood was an American keyboardist and singer who came from a musical family which included his father Bobby Sherwood, who was an actor, musician, and big band leader; his mother Phyllis, a drummer and singer; and younger brother Billy (Yes, ASIA). His father gave him his first keyboard when he was four years old.

Sherwood (keys, vocals) formed the band Lodgic with Jimmy Haun on guitar in 1977, while growing up in Las Vegas. Also in the band were Mark and Tom Fletcher, and Gary Starns on drums. The band would later include Guy Allison on keyboards (from 1979) and brother Billy (bass, later also vocals). Billy was originally recruited to play less "busy" bass parts than their previous bass player. The band covered Return to Forever, Peter Frampton, Frank Zappa and Yes. They eventually moved to Los Angeles in 1980, managed by Barry Morgan, and around the same time began writing their own material. The band met Jeff Porcaro, who along with other members of Toto, mentored them.

After many years of trying to get things together, they recorded their debut album Nomadic Sands, released in 1986. The album was to be produced by David Paich and David Foster, then by Paich and James Newton Howard, before eventually being produced by Paich and Steve Porcaro. Sherwood worked with Toto keyboardist Steve Porcaro during this period; one of their co-writes titled "For All Time" was considered for Michael Jackson's Dangerous album, as a follow up for "Human Nature". It was not used because Jackson chose the song "Gone Too Soon" instead, but was then finished for inclusion on Thriller 25.

Michael Sherwood and Jimmy Haun then worked with Air Supply. Sherwood worked on The Earth Is ... (1991), The Vanishing Race (1993) and News from Nowhere (1995).

Sherwood did session work, including backing vocals on the Anderson/Bruford/Wakeman/Howe songs on Yes's Union album (on which brother Billy also performed, but on a different track).

A solo album, Tangletown, was released in 1998, largely written with Julius Robinson, produced by Steve McCormick. Players included Steve McCormick (guitars and vocals), the late Jamie Chez (drums and vocals), Tom Felicetta (long-haired bass), and Dorian Crozier (drums on "Angry as I Am" and "The Censor"), and singers C.C. White, Danny Peck and Michiko Freemond. Guests included Christian Nesmith, who co-produced along with Chez and Felicetta. Mixed by Tom Fletcher.

Sherwood also appeared on Ted Jacobs' 2000 album The Days Gone By, while he and Robinson worked on music for the 2001 film Angel Eyes. In 2004, he joined Conspiracy, Billy's band with Yes bassist Chris Squire, to record a live-in-the-studio DVD, released in 2006. Sherwood has also worked with the Gluey Brothers, Jack Russell, Lisa Loeb, Steve Porcaro, Air Supply, Jonathan Elias, Circa, Julius Robinson, Christian Nesmith. He also made music for TV shows and adverts, including work for Elias Associates.

Sherwood co-wrote, co-produced and sang on Steve Porcaro's debut solo album Someday/Somehow, released 2016; he also wrote material for Toto XIV.

Sherwood unexpectedly died on 5 November 2019, at the age of 60 years old.
