= Jay Schellen =

American drummer (born 1960)

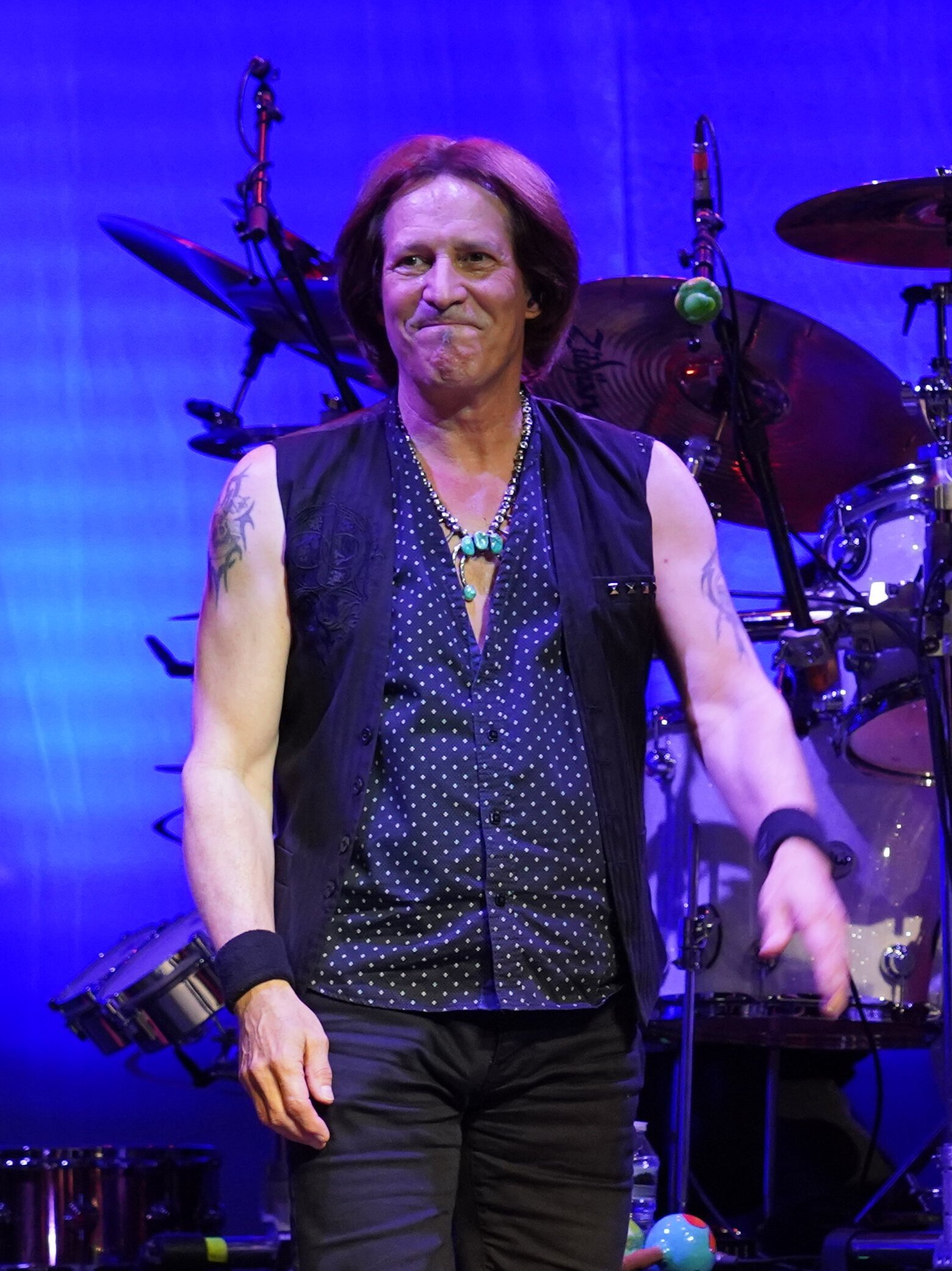
- Schellen in 2024

Background information
- Born: May 20, 1960 (age 66); Albuquerque, New Mexico, U.S.
- Genres: Heavy metal; progressive rock; hard rock
- Occupations: Drummer; songwriter; author
- Instruments: Drums; vocals
- Years active: 1979–present
- Member of: Unruly Child; Arc of Life; Yes
- Formerly of: Hurricane; Asia; Circa; World Trade; Asia Featuring John Payne; Sircle of Silence; Stone Fury; GPS; Conspiracy
- Website: jayschellen.com

Jay Schellen (Note: Some sources provide Schellen's full name as Jay Schellenbaum, though his official website biography indicates Jay David Schellen.) (born May 20, 1960) is an American drummer who is the current drummer of the English progressive rock band Yes, having toured with the band as an additional drummer since 2016 before becoming an official member in 2023, following the death of longtime drummer Alan White. Schellen has also worked with a number of other heavy rock and progressive rock bands, including with Hurricane, Asia, World Trade, Circa, and Unruly Child.

== Early life ==
Schellen's father was a musician. Schellen initially took lessons in classical piano, but he was drawn to the drums and started learning to play with Nick Lucchetti.

As a teenager, Schellen was in a group called Kick. He later formed a group called Ritual, named after a piece on Yes's Tales from Topographic Oceans album. Ritual started touring the southwest, middle and north of the US.

== Career ==
In 1979 as a teen, Schellen was introduced to the big stage, touring with R&B legend Al Wilson ("Show and Tell") supporting The Ohio Players. After moving to Los Angeles in 1981, Schellen broke into the LA session scene and played local stages with former Yes guitarist Peter Banks' band and National arenas with Danny Johnson and The Bandits supporting ZZ Top. In 1982, Schellen was invited to join English pop band Badfinger joining Tommy Evans, Joey Molland, Glen Sherba and Yes keyboardist Tony Kaye.

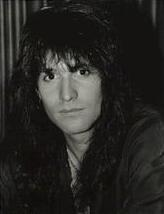
Schellen in the 1990s

In 1984, Schellen joined Stone Fury, working with singer Lenny Wolf and guitarist Bruce Gowdy. From 1985 to 1991, he joined the melodic rock group Hurricane. Hurricane went on to record three records, Take What You Want, Over the Edge and Slave to the Thrill, 3 worldwide tours and posted two top ten MTV videos. In 1993, Schellen joined Gowdy in a new melodic rock project, Unruly Child, releasing a self-titled CD. Schellen again worked with Gowdy in 1995, joining World Trade for their second album Euphoria, alongside Billy Sherwood (later in Yes). Schellen and Sherwood were the only members of World Trade for appearances on two tribute albums released on the Magna Carta record label in 1995.

In 1995–1997, Schellen formed Sircle of Silence with singer David Reece (ex-Accept, ex-Bangalore Choir), guitarist Larry Farkas (ex-Vengeance Rising, ex-Die Happy) and bass guitarist Greg Chaisson (ex-Badlands). In 1997, Schellen published his well regarded drum method book Rocking Independence. In 1998, he played in Heaven and Earth with former Hurricane bandmate Kelly Hansen and guitarist Stuart Saunders Smith. 1998–1999 saw a second Unruly Child album with Gowdy and Hansen. In 1999, Schellen played on Sherwood's debut solo album The Big Peace, while the next year he recorded for Sherwood's project with Yes bassist Chris Squire, Conspiracy. In 2003, Schellen re-joined Conspiracy, recording The Unknown, followed by a live-in-the-studio DVD recorded in 2004 and released in 2006. Schellen has continued to work with Sherwood on a number of other projects including joining progressive group Circa in 2008 (replacing Alan White), thus re-joining Tony Kaye again on keyboards and Jimmy Haun on guitars. They released Circa HQ in January 2009. He also worked with Yoso in the band's initial stages, again working with Sherwood and Kaye. In 2010 Jay joined Sherwood, Jimmy Haun and Kaye again to perform "Headsets" in collaboration with legendary Rock and Roll DJ Jim Ladd staged at the Laserium in Los Angeles, California.

In 2004, Schellen with Sherwood worked on pre-production for Asia's album Silent Nation with Geoff Downes (another former Yes keyboardist). In August 2005, Schellen replaced Chris Slade as the drummer in Asia. The group toured Europe extensively and released a live recording, however, in 2006, Downes left the line up for a reunion of the original founding members Asia quartet: Schellen and the other two Asia band members, singer John Payne and guitarist Guthrie Govan, formed a new band, GPS. GPS released their debut CD Window to the Soul. In 2008, Asia Featuring John Payne was formed with Payne, Govan, keyboardist Erik Norlander, and Schellen on drums. An album was released under the new name of Dukes of the Orient. Unruly Child has also reunited.

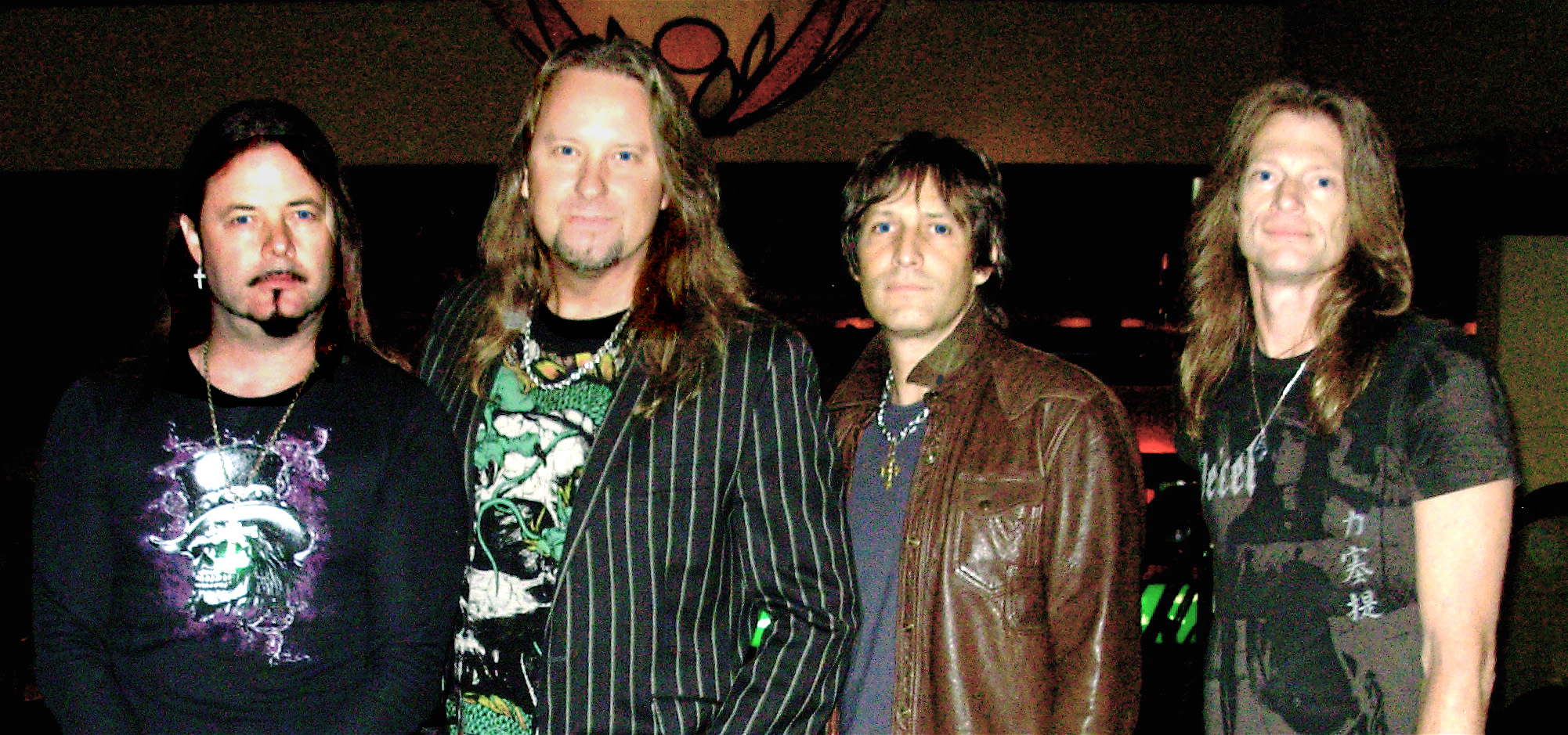
Schellen (second from right) with Asia featuring John Payne in 2009

From September 2013, he was performing in the Las Vegas production of Raiding the Rock Vault, initially alongside his Asia bandmate John Payne.

In 2016, Schellen temporarily replaced Yes drummer Alan White on their 2016 North American tour while White recovered from back surgery and continued to play with them alongside White through White's recovery until February 2017. For the February 2018 Cruise to the Edge shows, Schellen once again performed as second guest drummer to support White, who had been battling a bacterial infection in his joints since November 2017. Schellen took over for White on 2022 UK and Ireland dates of the Close to the Edge tour shortly prior to White's death in May 2022. He was announced as a permanent member of Yes in February 2023.

Schellen plays DW drums, Remo drumheads, and Zildjian cymbals and sticks.

== Discography ==
- Hurricane – Take What You Want (1985)
- Jef Scott – Ten Stories (1986)
- Hurricane – Over the Edge (1988)
- Hurricane – Slave to the Thrill (1990)
- Unruly Child – Unruly Child (1992)
- Lynx – Lynx (1993)
- Sircle of Silence – Sircle of Silence (1993)
- Sircle of Silence – Suicide Candyman (1994)
- Air Pavilion – Sarrph Cogh (1994)
- Marcie Free – Tormented (1995)
- various artists – Jeffology – A Guitar Chronicle (1995)
- Stream – Take It Or Leave It (1995)
- World Trade – Euphoria (1995)
- Murderer's Row – Murderer's Row (1996)
- various artists – Crossfire – A Salute to Stevie Ray (1996)
- Billy Sherwood – The Big Peace (1999)
- Chris Squire & Billy Sherwood – Conspiracy
- Conspiracy – The Unknown
- GPS – Window To The Soul (2006)
- Overland – Epic (2014)
- Yes – Topographic Drama – Live Across America (2017)
- Peter Banks – Be Well, Be Safe, Be Lucky... The Anthology (2018)
- Dukes of the Orient – Dukes of the Orient (2018)
- Yes – Yes 50 Live (2019)
- David Cross and Peter Banks – Crossover (2020)
- Yes – The Royal Affair Tour: Live from Las Vegas (2020)
- Yes – The Quest (2021)
- Tony Kaye – The End of Innocence (2021)
- Yes – Mirror to the Sky (2023)
- Yes - Aurora (2026)
