= Conspiracy (band) =

Progressive rock band (1992–2004)

- Also known as: The Chris Squire Experiment
- Origin: United States
- Genre: Progressive rock
- Years active: 1992–2004
- Labels: Eagle (UK); InsideOut; Cleopatra (U.S.)
- Past members: Chris Squire; Billy Sherwood; Jay Schellen; Michael Sherwood; Steve Porcaro; Jimmy Haun; Alan White; Mark T. Williams
- Website: ConspiracyMusic.net

Conspiracy (formerly known as The Chris Squire Experiment) was a progressive rock band founded by Chris Squire (then bassist in Yes) and Billy Sherwood (formerly and subsequently of Yes). The band released two albums: Conspiracy (2000) and The Unknown (2003), and a live DVD (2006).

== History ==
=== Squire & Sherwood in Yes ===
In the late 1980s, Yes' original lead singer Jon Anderson had left the group to form Anderson Bruford Wakeman Howe with three other former Yes members. Chris Squire brought Billy Sherwood, a young musician he had met, to work with the group as a possible new lead singer. With Trevor Rabin also absent for a time (concentrating on his solo work), a line-up of the three remaining Yesmen—Squire, Alan White and Tony Kaye—plus Sherwood and guitarist Bruce Gowdy, Sherwood's bandmate in World Trade, began rehearsing together. Rabin subsequently returned to the band and demos were recorded with a line-up of Squire, White, Kaye, Rabin and Sherwood.

Squire and Sherwood had formed a strong writing partnership, but Sherwood was not officially admitted to Yes and was uneasy about the idea of replacing Anderson as frontman. A reunion with Anderson Bruford Wakeman Howe left no official role for Sherwood, although one Squire/Sherwood composition, "The More We Live—Let Go", was released on the Yes album Union (1991).

=== The Chris Squire Experiment ===
Having written a body of work, Squire and Sherwood went on a brief US tour in 1992 under the name The Chris Squire Experiment. The other musicians in the band were White on drums, Jimmy Haun on guitar (who had played much of the guitar on Union), Steve Porcaro on keyboards and Mark T. Williams on percussion. (Note: The set for the 22 August 1992 show in San Juan Capistrano, California was: "Wish I knew (later became Yes's Open your eyes)", "The Lonesome Trail", "You're the reason I live", "One World Going Round", "Days of Wonder", "Porcaro Keyboards Solo", "Follow Our Dreams", "Say Goodbye", "Whitefish", and "Wish I knew (Open your eyes) (reprise)". The set for the 25 August 1992 show in San Jose, California was: "Wish I knew (Open your eyes)", "The Lonesome Trail", "You're the Reason I live", "One World Going Round", "Days of Wonder", "Follow Our Dreams". Another show once included "Long Distance Runaround".)

Further collaborative work by Squire and Sherwood cropped up: "The Evolution Song" and "Say Goodbye" appeared on Euphoria, the second World Trade album while "Love Conquers All", a Yes song they had written, was released on the YesYears collection.

The years passed—work continued on and off on the material while Sherwood continued to work with Yes in different capacities—when finally, in the late 1990s, a release under the Chris Squire Experiment name was announced, an album to be called Chemistry.

However, once again, events in the Yes camp took over when Sherwood officially joined the band in 1996. Two tracks from Chemistry ("Open Your Eyes" and "Man in the Moon") were re-worked by Yes for Open Your Eyes (1997).

=== Conspiracy ===
==== Conspiracy ====
The use of these two tracks from Chemistry stalled the release while Squire pondered what to do. Eventually in 2000, the Chemistry name was dropped, and Conspiracy by Chris Squire & Billy Sherwood was released. Everything that was to be on Chemistry made it to Conspiracy (presuming a song title on Chemistry of "You are the Light of My Life" became the song "Light in My Life" on Conspiracy). Not wishing for the album to be seen as a re-release of existing material, the two original mixes of the Open Your Eyes tracks and an alternate version of World Trade's "Say Goodbye" were included on Conspiracy, but as hidden bonus tracks. Versions of Yes's "The More We Live—Let Go" and "Love Conquers All" and World Trade's "The Evolution Song" re-titled "Watching The World" were also included on Conspiracy, plus the material played on the Chris Squire Experiment tour.

Squire and Sherwood share lead vocals on the album, with Squire playing most of the bass parts and Sherwood playing most of the guitar and keyboard parts, plus contributing some drumming. The name Conspiracy represented Squire and Sherwood's desire to collaborate with different musicians. The album included appearances from White, Haun and World Trade drummers Jay Schellen and Mark T Williams. Conspiracy also included one track based on a set of jam sessions involving Squire, Steve Stevens and Michael Bland called "Violet Purple Rose", consisting of a recording from the sessions with overdubs from Sherwood.

==== The Unknown and a live DVD ====
The album name became a band name and Conspiracy became a fully fledged group based around Squire (bass, vocals), Sherwood (guitar, keys, vocals) and Schellen (drums). The album The Unknown was released in 2003. Guests include Haun, Michael Sherwood (Billy's older brother) and Jordan Berliant (better known as Yes' then manager). The initial pressing of the album includes a bonus track entitled "I Could", an alternate form of the first half of the Yes track "Finally" released on The Ladder (1999). Many of the album lyrics refer to the events of the 9/11 terrorist attacks. Cover art was by Bob Cesca, who had also worked with Yes.

Shortly after leaving Yes in 2000, Sherwood had planned a project called The Unknown including brother Michael, Haun, Schellen and Jonathan Elias. Nothing more came of this, but the title track of the Conspiracy album was co-written with M. Sherwood and Haun and derives from those plans.

Conspiracy's live lineup was assembled in 2004 with Squire (bass, vocals, guitars), B. Sherwood (guitars, keys, vocals), Schellen (drums), M. Sherwood (keys, vocals) and Scott Walton (keys). They rehearsed, but touring plans were abandoned. However, a private live show was recorded and released on DVD by 2006. Their set included Conspiracy tracks, material from Open Your Eyes and from Squire's 1975 Fish Out of Water solo album.

=== After Conspiracy: band break-up and side projects ===
The band was looking towards a third album, but was curtailed when Squire moved from the US back to London, UK. By 2006, Sherwood was leading the project without Squire's involvement. A new album was announced and expected to include two songs written by Sherwood and Gowdy, left over from a cancelled World Trade album. Others appearing were to include former Yes members Tony Kaye, Geoff Downes, and former Gentle Giant guitarist Gary Green. (Kaye and Green have worked with Sherwood on a number of other projects.) However, in 2007, Sherwood announced that this project, called Psy-Op, would be released under a different name and, while finished, will be put back so as not to compete with Sherwood, Kaye and White's then-new band, Circa. He later announced that the album was cancelled, with the material subsequently being used for other projects.

In a late 2007 interview, Sherwood said, "I don’t foresee another Conspiracy record, simply because Chris lives in London and I live here in the States. I’m doing Circa now and he is doing his own thing. We have drifted apart in terms of working together simply by location/geographically more than anything. I’m enjoying playing bass a lot right now, my focus is on Circa and obviously Conspiracy is dear to my heart, but it took a turn and went into a dormant mode here so really see anything in the future right here at the moment."

Squire then moved to Phoenix, Arizona. In a June 2012 interview, he said: "There are offers for us to do a third Conspiracy album. At the moment, my hands are a little full because of [Yes touring and Squackett]". In a late 2012 interview, Sherwood said: "I have been in contact with Chris recently, he played on the Prog Collective project as well as The Supertramp Tribute I did recently. We have spoken about Conspiracy doing more in the future, we shall see..." And in a November 2012 interview, "Chris and I have spoken about it, but it comes down to schedules and at present geography. I live in LA and Chris no longer does. That alone makes the process tricky. That said you never know… we shall see."

In an April 2013 Q&A for Yes's official website, YesWorld, Squire said: "There is a possibility down the road, I could do another Conspiracy album with Billy but presently I'm very tied up with my work with YES, and possibly another album with Steve Hackett".

Sherwood began working more with Yes again and Squire guested on other projects by Sherwood, but no further Conspiracy work followed. With Squire's death in 2015, the future of the project remains uncertain.

== Discography ==
=== Albums ===
- 2000: Conspiracy
- 2003: The Unknown

=== Videos ===
- 2006: Conspiracy Live
