= Jimmy Haun =

American musician

Jimmy Cary Haun is an American guitarist and composer, known for his work with the bands Yes, Air Supply, and Circa.

== Career ==
Haun got his start in the music business through his childhood friend Michael and toured with Michael's father's Bobby Sherwood jazz band at 15 years old playing jazz standards and hits of the day. Too young to go into the lounges they toured, the boys were forced to sit backstage between shows and work up their own brand of music. Out of this came their first band Lodgic and later Michael's younger brother Billy would take over the role as bass player. They released an album in 1985 on A&M Records produced by David Paich and Steve Porcaro of the group Toto. Some touring followed by opening for Supertramp in the mid-'80s.

Thanks to Steve Lukather, Haun got some gigs working as a session musician playing on numerous recordings. As for session work, Haun has recorded with Yes, David Bowie, B.B. King, Jon and Vangelis, Buddy Miles, Cher and Celine Dion (with Diane Warren and Guy Roche), Air Supply, Adrian "Tricky" Thaws, Ian Lloyd, Ray Manzarek, Ronnie Laws, Lindsey Haun, Sheryl Crow, Danny Peck, Michael Ruff, Bobby Kimball, Steve Porcaro, Lodgic, Circa, Jonathan Elias, Lodgic, Arc of Life, Billy Sherwood and Chris Squire. Around this time, Haun met Michael Ruff and did some west coast touring where he then met Sheryl Crow who was singing backup for Ruff and joined one of her first bands along with Greg Phillinganes, Armand Grimaldi and Jerry Watts on bass. Haun went on to play much of the guitar on Yes's 1991 album Union, before work in The Key with Billy Sherwood and in The Chris Squire Experiment with Billy Sherwood and Chris Squire. He also did session work for Air Supply, Kitaro and Jon & Vangelis during this period.

Haun got involved with Yes producer Jonathan Elias and started composing music for TV and film. In 1996, Haun composed the Mandalay Pictures logo's fanfare. Haun worked extensively with Jonathan Elias, including his American River album (2004) but also on music for commercials. Haun created the original yodel logo for Yahoo in 1996 as well as the voice for Expedia.com. Recent work includes singing the "Oh oh oh It's Magic" cover for the Ozempic campaign

Haun re-joined Billy Sherwood in the Yes spin-off supergroup Circa, formed in 2006, also with Tony Kaye (ex-Yes) and initially Alan White. Sherwood, Kaye and Haun were also in Yoso with singer Bobby Kimball. Yoso subsequently disbanded and Haun left Circa to focus on commercial work.

In September 2012, Haun announced that he was working on a Jon Anderson solo album with Elias and M. Sherwood, but the project subsequently stalled before completion. Haun continued working with Anderson and two songs co-written by Haun are on Anderson’s album with the Band Geeks, True.

Haun composed the music for the film Boulevard starring Robin Williams. He also is credited with producing and singing the end song "Goodbye Joy”.

In 2016, Haun played the majority of the guitars on Steve Porcaro's solo album Someday/Somehow.

In 2020, Haun joined Arc of Life, a new band spun off from Yes by Sherwood and Yes' lead singer Jon Davison.

In 2023, he composed the music for the comedy horror film Hanky Panky.

== Family ==
Haun's father was singer Jim Haun, better known as Rouvaun. Jimmy Haun's daughter is the actress and singer Lindsey Haun (born 1984) and he has worked with her on her music career.
