= Steve Howe discography =

Artist discography

Steve Howe is an English guitarist, active since 1964. He is best known for his tenures with the rock groups Yes and Asia, including his solo albums.

== Discography ==
=== Solo ===
Studio albums

- Beginnings (1975)
- The Steve Howe Album (1979)
- Turbulence (1991)
- The Grand Scheme of Things (1993)
- Quantum Guitar (1998)
- Portraits of Bob Dylan (1999)
- Natural Timbre (2001)
- Masterpiece Guitars with Martin Taylor (2002; recorded 1996)
- Elements (2003)
- Spectrum (2005)
- Motif volume 1 (2008)
- Time (2011)
- Love Is (2020)
- Motif volume 2 (2023)
- Guitarscape (2024)

Live albums

- Not Necessarily Acoustic (1994)
- Pulling Strings (1999)
- Remedy Live (2005)

=== Homebrew series ===
The Homebrew series consists on compilations of demos and other mostly solo recordings. Some of these recordings were eventually reworked into songs appearing in other solo or group albums, while others are new versions of previous songs.

- Homebrew (1996)
- Homebrew 2 (2000)
- Homebrew 3 (2005)
- Homebrew 4 (2010)
- Homebrew 5 (2013)
- Homebrew 6 (2016)
- Homebrew 7 (2021)

=== The Steve Howe Trio ===
- The Haunted Melody (2008)
- Travelling (2010)
- New Frontier (2019)

=== Compilations ===
- Mothballs (1994 - compilation with pieces from The Syndicats, The In Crowd, Tomorrow, Keith West, Canto, Bodast and solo tracks)
- Light Walls (2003 - 2CD's compilation from Seraphim, Voyagers, Quantum Guitar, Portraits of Bob Dylan and Natural Timbre)
- Guitar World (2003 - compilation from: Portraits of Bob Dylan and Natural Timbre)
- Anthology - A solo career retrospective (2015 - 2CD totalling 33 songs)
- Anthology 2: Groups and Collaborations (2016 - 3CD totalling 56 songs)

=== Videography ===
- Classic Rock Legends (2002)
- Careful With That Axe (2004)
- Steve Howe's Remedy Live (2005)

=== With other bands ===
==== With The Syndicats ====
- Maybellene / True To Me (1964) Produced by Joe Meek (EMI)
- Howlin For My Baby/(Tell Me) What To Do (1965), Produced by Joe Meek (EMI)
- The Horizon, (reached number 17 on the charts) / Crawdaddy Simone (1965) (Steve played on The horizon), Produced by Joe Meek (EMI)
- The hit song Maybellene, on a 1964 compilation LP On the scene (With The Animals, Georgie Fame, Yardbirds, Mickie Most, Downliners sect. - Columbia/EMI)

==== With The In Crowd (became Tomorrow) ====
- "Why Must They Criticise" / "You're On Your Own" Produced by Roy Pitt. (single, Parlophone R5364, November 1965)
- "Stop, Wait A Minute" / "I Don't Mind" (single, Parlophone R5328, September 1965)

==== With Tomorrow ====
- My White Bicycle/Claramount Lake (single)
- Revolution/Three Jolly Little Dwarfs (single)
- Tomorrow (Parlophone, February 1968) (rééd. Tomorrow featuring Keith West, 1999)
- 50 Minute Technicolor Dream (RPM 184, 1998)

==== With Bodast ====
- The Early Years - Steve Howe with Bodast (CD 1988 & 1990 - first LP edit in 1969 (CS))

==== With Yes ====
Studio albums

- The Yes Album (1971)
- Fragile (1971)
- Close to the Edge (1972)
- Tales from Topographic Oceans (1973)
- Relayer (1974)
- Going for the One (1977)
- Tormato (1978)
- Drama (1980)
- Union (1991)
- Keys to Ascension (1996) (live and studio tracks)
- Keys to Ascension 2 (1997) (live and studio tracks)
- Open Your Eyes (1997)
- The Ladder (1999)
- Magnification (2001)
- Fly from Here (2011)
- Heaven & Earth (2014)
- From a Page (2019)
- The Quest (2021)
- Mirror to the Sky (2023)
- Aurora (2026)

Live albums

- Yessongs (1973)
- Yesshows (1980)
- Keys to Ascension (1996) (live and studio tracks)
- Keys to Ascension 2 (1997) (live and studio tracks)
- House of Yes: Live from House of Blues (2000)
- Symphonic Live (1 CD) (2003) (Would be Re-edited in 2009 in a two CD package)
- The Word Is Live (3 CD) (2005)
- Live at Montreux 2003 (2007)
- Symphonic Live (2 CD) (2009)
- In the Present – Live from Lyon (2011)
- Songs from Tsongas (2014)
- Like It Is: Yes at the Bristol Hippodrome (2 CD + DVD) (2014)
- Progeny: Seven Shows from Seventy-Two (14 CD) (2015)
- Progeny: Highlights from Seventy-Two (2 CD) (2015)
- Like It Is: Yes at the Mesa Arts Center (2 CD + DVD) (2015)
- Topographic Drama – Live Across America (2 CD) (2017)
- Yes 50 Live (2 CD) (2019)
- The Royal Affair Tour: Live from Las Vegas (2020)
- Union 30 Live (2021) - 26 CD Boxset

Compilations

- The New Age of Atlantic (1972)
- Yesterdays (1975) - Steve plays on America
- Classic Yes (1981)
- Yesyears (1991) - 4 CD Boxset
- Yesstory (1992)
- Affirmative: The Yes Solo Family Album (1993)
- Highlights: The Very Best of Yes (1993)
- Yes, Friends and Relatives (1998)
- The Best of Yes (1999)
- Yes, Friends and Relatives Vol. 2 (2000)
- In a Word: Yes (1969–)(2002)
- Yes, Friends and Relatives: The Ultimate Collection (2002)
- The Ultimate Yes: 35th Anniversary Collection (2003) - 3 CD Boxset
- Essentially Yes (2006) - 5 CD Boxset

==== With Anderson Bruford Wakeman Howe ====
- Anderson Bruford Wakeman Howe (1989)
- An Evening of Yes Music Plus (1993) (live album)

==== With Asia ====
- Asia (1982)
- Alpha (1983)
- Aqua (1992)
- Aura (2001)
- Then & Now (1990 compilation, + four unreleased songs)
- Fantasia: Live in Tokyo (2007) (also on DVD)
- Phoenix (2008)
- Omega (2010)
- Asia (2010 remastered, like Super Audio CD)
- XXX (2012)

==== With GTR ====
- GTR (1986)
- King Biscuit Flower Hour (1997)

==== With Paul Sutin ====
- Seraphim (1989)
- Voyagers (1995)
- Skyline (2002)

==== With Explorers Club ====
- Age of Impact (1998)

==== With Oliver Wakeman ====
- The 3 Ages of Magick (2001)

==== With Dylan Howe ====
- Subterranean - New Designs on Bowie's Berlin (2014) - Steve plays koto on Moss Garden

==== With Virgil Howe ====
- Nexus (Inside Out; November 2017) Steve plays guitars throughout the album
- Lunar Mist (Inside Out; September 2022)

=== Guest appearances ===
- Lou Reed - Lou Reed (session playing on most of the album) (1972) With Rick Wakeman.
- Curtiss Maldoon - Curtiss Maldoon (1972)
- Johnny Harris - All to bring you morning (1973) With Jon Anderson & Alan White.
- Rick Wakeman - "Catherine of Aragon", album The Six Wives of Henry VIII (1973)
- Alan White - "Song Of Innocence", album Ramshackled (1975) With Jon Anderson
- Dixie Dregs - "Up in the Air", album Industry Standard (1982)
- Frankie Goes to Hollywood - "Welcome to the Pleasuredome", album Welcome to the Pleasuredome (1984)
- Propaganda - "The Murder of Love", album A Secret Wish (1985)
- Frankie Goes to Hollywood - "Maximum Joy", album Liverpool (1986)
- Billy Currie - Transportation, appears on 6 of 8 tracks (1988)
- Guitar Speak - Various artists (1988)
- Andy Leek - Say Something album (1988)
- Animal Logic - Animal Logic album (1989)
- Various artists - Night of the Guitar Live (1989), appears on 4 tracks
- Queen - "Innuendo", album Innuendo (1991)
- Martin Taylor - Artistry (1992)
- Rick Wakeman - Classical Connection II album (1992) With Chris Squire and Alan White
- London Philharmonic Orchestra - Symphonic Music of Yes (1993) - With Jon Anderson and Bill Bruford
- Bee Gees - Size Isn't Everything (1993)
- Fish - "Time and a Word", album Yin (1995)
- Dream Theater - "Starship Trooper", DVD 5 Years in a Livetime (1998)
- Matthew Sweet and Susanna Hoffs - Under the Covers, Vol. 2 (2009)
- William Shatner - Seeking Major Tom (2011) With Patrick Moraz
- Nektar - A Spoonful of Time (2012) With Geoff Downes, Rick Wakeman, Patrick Moraz
- Dylan Howe - Steve plays koto on "Moss Garden", album Subterranean: New Designs on Bowie's Berlin (2014)
- Various artists - "Light My Fire", album Light My Fire—A Classic Rock Salute to The Doors (2014)
- Rick Wakeman - Starship Trooper album (2016, compilation), appears on The great gig in the sky and Light my fire
- Paul K Joyce - Celestial (2019)
