= Pulling Strings =

Pulling Strings may refer to:

- Pulling Strings (film), a 2013 film
- Pulling Strings (album), a Steve Howe album
- "Pulling Strings" (White Collar), an episode of White Collar
