= See Me Through =

See Me Through may refer to:

- "See Me Through", a song by Edison Glass from Time Is Fiction
- "See Me Through", a song by Ida Maria from Fortress Round My Heart
- "See Me Through", a song by Kenny Rogers from Across My Heart
- "See Me Through", a song by Rascal Flatts from Rascal Flatts
- "See Me Through", a song by Steve Howe from Love Is
- "See Me Through", a song by Van Morrison from Enlightenment
  - "See Me Through, Pt. 2 (Just a Closer Walk with Thee)", a song by Van Morrison from Hymns to the Silence
- "See Me Through", a song by El-B
- "See Me Through", a song by the Hybirds
- "See Me Through", a song by Urchin
