= Yes Remixes =

Remix album by Yes
- Released: 8 July 2003
- Recorded: 1969–1980; 2003
- Genre: Techno
- Length: 62:10
- Label: Rhino
- Producer: Virgil Howe; vinyl tracks produced by Yes, Tony Colton and Eddy Offord

Yes chronology
The Ultimate Yes: 35th Anniversary Collection (2003)	Yes Remixes (2003)	Songs from Tsongas (2005)

Professional ratings
Review scores
Source	Rating
AllMusic	2/5 stars

Yes Remixes is a remix album featuring the songs of progressive rock band Yes and was released in 2003. Taking material harking back from 1970's Time and a Word to 1980s Drama, Virgil Howe a.k.a. "The Verge" (and son of Steve Howe) re-imagined Yes's music into a techno context, dramatically altering the band's sound. Although it briefly dented the remix sales charts, the album failed to chart at all in the regular listings.

== Track listing ==
No.	Title	Writer(s)	Length
1.	"Tempus Fugit"	Geoff Downes, Trevor Horn, Steve Howe, Chris Squire, Alan White	5:07
2.	"Arriving UFO"	Jon Anderson, Howe, Rick Wakeman	5:54
3.	"Heart of the Sunrise"	Anderson, Squire, Bill Bruford	5:59
4.	"Starship Trooper"	Anderson, Squire, Howe	7:33
5.	"Awaken"	Anderson, Howe	7:48
6.	"Sound Chaser"	Anderson, Squire, Howe, White, Patrick Moraz	5:24
7.	"Ritual"	Anderson, Squire, Howe, Wakeman, White	6:20
8.	"Siberian Khatru"	Anderson; themes by Anderson, Howe, and Wakeman	5:26
9.	"Five Per Cent for Nothing"	Bruford	4:40
10.	"No Opportunity Necessary, No Experience Needed"	Richie Havens	4:44
11.	"No Clowns"	Anderson, Bruford, Downes, Horn, Howe, Moraz, Squire, Wakeman, White	3:15

== Charts ==
Yes Remixes (Rhino 78186) failed to chart in the UK or US.
