= Love Is (Steve Howe album) =

Studio album by Steve Howe
- Released: 31 July 2020
- Studios: Langley Studios, UK; Schwartz Sound Ardingly, UK
- Genre: Progressive rock
- Length: 43:24
- Label: BMG
- Producer: Steve Howe

Steve Howe chronology
Homebrew 6 (2016)	Love Is (2020)	Homebrew 7 (2021)

Love Is is the fourteenth studio album by English guitarist Steve Howe, best known as a member of Yes. It was first released on 31 July 2020, nine years after his previous album Time.

== Background and recording ==
The album features Yes frontman Jon Davison on bass and backing vocals, along with Howe's son Dylan Howe on drums. The album features 10 tracks, alternating between instrumentals and songs.

According to Howe, the theme of the record is "the importance of love", more specifically in nature and the universe. Moreover, about the world he'd like to see his granddaughter grow up in. Elaborating on this statement, Howe stated that:

“Alexander Humboldt went around the world and recognised we are destroying the planet but that was 200 years ago! We are still destroying the planet and, I suppose, my songs show the yearning I have for the love of nature and how beauty, art and music all stem from nature. There is a theme about those things, love, beauty, ecology, nature and wonderful people."

According to the credits, the record was recorded at Langley Studios, Devon and Curtis Schwartz Studios, both in the UK.

== Reception ==
In a review published by Spectrum News, the album, despite being "occasionally overly mellow and held back by his limited vocal range, the album still has enough flashes of Howe’s stringed wizardry to attract a crowd." Elaborating on this, tracks such as "See Me Through" are "catchy and well-paced", though a stronger lead vocalist would've put it "over the top", and "Love Is a River", being described as a "sort of quintessential track", being called one of the most Yes-like efforts on the album. Overall, the review stated that while you can occasionally find Howe's "classic Yes-era arpeggios, strums, and solos on practically all the tracks", as the minutes pass, they fade into less distinctive ideas.

A more positive review by Grace Hayhurst of Proghurst believed that the album was a wonderful breath of fresh air, hoping for more in the future. Specifically highlighting the vocals as showing he had put some "serious work" into them. Another positive review by Loudersound's Chris Roberts stated that outside of yes, Howe was "no less peripatetic". Furthermore, comparing the record to the Yes album Fly from Here if it was " homegrown and barefoot, relaxing in the sun with a welcoming smile on its face.", furthermore, describing the record as having "a gentle, warm feel overall".

Geoff Bailie of The Prog Report praised the record, stating that it is the best record Howe has ever released. Specifically stating that the reasons why it is so good include the pacing, stating that the alternation between songs and instrumentals fits well with the theme of the record, the soundscapes, stating that on the first track "Fulcrum", upon there first listening, they felt like they were "was taking a walk at sunset and the soundscape in my earphones was perfect for the moment.", and the band, praising Davison's vocals, and Dylan Howe's drumming.

== Track listing ==
All tracks are written by Steve Howe.

Love Is track listing
No.	Title	Length
1.	"Fulcrum"	4:26
2.	"See Me Through"	4:26
3.	"Beyond the Call"	4:50
4.	"Love Is a River"	5:54
5.	"Sound Picture"	3:36
6.	"It Ain't Easy"	4:24
7.	"Pause for Thought"	3:39
8.	"Imagination"	3:54
9.	"The Headlands"	3:12
10.	"On the Balcony"	4:59
Total length:		43:24

== Personnel ==
- Steve Howe – vocals, electric guitar, acoustic guitar, steel guitar, keyboards, percussion, bass guitar (1, 3, 5, 7, 9)
- Dylan Howe – drums
- Jon Davison – bass guitar and backing vocals (2, 4, 6, 8, 10)

== Charts ==
Chart (2020)	Peak position
Swiss Albums (Schweizer Hitparade)	74
Scottish Albums (Official Charts)	56
UK Independent Albums (Official Charts)	16
UK Rock & Metal Albums (Official Charts)	4
