= Quantum Guitar =

Studio album by Steve Howe
- Released: 21 April 1998
- Recorded: 1998
- Genre: Progressive rock
- Length: 61:09
- Label: Voiceprint
- Producer: Steve Howe

Steve Howe chronology
Homebrew (1996)	Quantum Guitar (1998)	Pulling Strings (1999)

Professional ratings
Review scores
Source	Rating
AllMusic	3/5 stars

Quantum Guitar is an instrumental progressive rock album released by Steve Howe in 1998. Howe uses several different guitars in this album.

== Track listing ==
All tracks composed by Steve Howe, except where indicated.

No.	Title	Writer(s)	Length
1.	"Walk Don't Run"	Johnny Smith	3:00
2.	"The Collector"		3:01
3.	"Light Walls"	Keith West, Steve Howe
4.	"Mosaic"		2:00
5.	"Suddenly"		10:10
6.	"Country Viper"		1:35
7.	"Mainland"		3:28
8.	"Knights Of Carmelite"		3:02
9.	"Paradox"		4:55
10.	"Momenta"		2:54
11.	"Sleep Walk"	Farina, Farina and Farina	3:12
12.	"Sovereigns"		2:12
13.	"Totality"		2:24
14.	"Solid Ground"		5:25
15.	"The Great Siege"		2:13
16.	"Cacti Garden"		2:24
17.	"Southern Accent"		4:09

== Musicians ==
- Steve Howe - acoustic, electric, six & twelve string guitars, steel guitar & pedal steel, mandolins, bass, keyboards, percussion
- Dylan Howe - drums
