= Steve Howe Trio =

- Origin: UK
- Genres: Jazz, jazz fusion
- Years active: 2007–2019
- Label: HoweSound
- Members: Steve Howe; Ross Stanley; Dylan Howe

The Steve Howe Trio was an English jazz trio led by Yes guitarist Steve Howe. Howe formed the band in 2007 with his son Dylan Howe on drums and Ross Stanley on Hammond organ.

== History ==
The Steve Howe Trio toured the United Kingdom in 2007. The set list included songs by jazz guitarist Kenny Burrell, whom Howe has credited as an inspiration. In June 2008, the trio toured again and released the album The Haunted Melody.

Further touring followed in March 2010, along with the release of a live album, Travelling. The album contains material recorded from shows in 2008 in the UK and Canada.

== Discography ==
- The Haunted Melody (2008)
- Travelling (2010)
- New Frontier (2019), includes three compositions by Bill Bruford
