= The Syndicats =

English freakbeat band (1963–1966)

- Origin: London, England
- Genre: Freakbeat
- Years active: 1963–1966
- Past members: Steve Howe; John Lamb; Kevin Driscoll; Jeff Williams; John "Truelove" Melton; Thomas Ladd; Ray Fenwick; Peter Banks; Paul Holm

The Syndicats were an English freakbeat band formed in September 1963 in North London.

The group initially consisted of John Lamb on vocals, Steve Howe on guitar and backing vocals, Kevin Driscoll on bass and backing vocals, Jeff Williams on organ and piano, and John "Truelove" Melton on drums. John Lamb was later replaced by Thomas Ladd. John "Truelove" Melton was replaced by Paul Holm on their last single in 1965.

When Steve Howe left The Syndicats to join the In Crowd in November 1965 (which would later become Tomorrow), he was replaced by guitarist Ray Fenwick, who was subsequently replaced by Peter Banks. Banks went on to be the first guitarist in Yes, later replaced by Howe in 1970.

The Syndicats' first single was released on 8 April 1964, a cover of Chuck Berry's "Maybellene" on the A side, and on the B side, a joint composition of Howe and Ladd, "True to Me". Their second single was another cover, a song by Willie Dixon, "Howlin' for My Baby", with the B side being a song credited to the entire band, "(Tell Me) What to Do". Their third and final single, "On the Horizon", was a composition by Jerry Leiber & Mike Stoller on the A side and, on side B, "Crawdaddy Simone", a song by Fenwick and Williams produced by Joe Meek. Fenwick plays the guitar solo in this song.

Many years later, Fenwick joined Steve Howe's Remedy live band for a 2004 tour (released on DVD in 2005). "Crawdaddy Simone" was covered by a British band called The Horrors on their eponymous EP released in 2006.

== Compilations ==
Steve Howe's 1994 Mothballs compilation of his early work contains seven tracks by The Syndicats, including the first two singles (A and B sides), "Leave My Kitten Alone" (a cover of the song by Little Willie John, Titus Turner and James McDougal), "Don't Know What to Do" by Howe himself, and "On the Horizon".

On Howe's 2016 compilation Anthology 2: Groups & Collaborations, there is "Maybellene" and "On the Horizon". Ray Fenwick also plays with Steve Howe on a previously unpublished song called "Slim Pickings", recorded in 2002, with the late Virgil Howe on drums.

== Singles ==
- "Maybellene" (Chuck Berry) / "True to Me" (Ladd/Howe) (8 April 1964, Columbia DB 7238)
- "Howling for My Baby" (Willie Dixon) / "What To Do" (Howe/Truelove/K. Driscoll/T. Driscoll) (January 1965, Columbia DB 7441)
- "On the Horizon" (Leiber/Stoller) / "Crawdaddy Simone" (Fenwick/Williams) (10 September 1965, Columbia DB 7686)
