= Motif (album) =

Studio album by Steve Howe
- Released: 19 August 2008
- Recorded: 2005–2007
- Genre: Acoustic
- Length: 59:58
- Label: HoweSound
- Producer: Steve Howe

Steve Howe chronology
Homebrew 3 (2005)	Motif (2008)	The Haunted Melody (2008)

Professional ratings
Review scores
Source	Rating
Record Collector	3/5 stars
CD Universe	4/5 stars

Motif (also known as Motif Volume 1) is a 2008 album by guitarist Steve Howe. The album features re-recordings of songs from Howe's career, including pieces from his solo albums as well as "Sketches in the Sun" from GTR and "Clap" from The Yes Album.

== Track listing ==
No.	Title	Length
1.	"The Golden Mean"	02:50
2.	"Intersection Blues"	02:41
3.	"Corkscrew"	03:44
4.	"Trambone"	01:47
5.	"Devon Blue"	02:57
6.	"Clap"	03:18
7.	"Australia"	04:07
8.	"Part and Parcel"	03:02
9.	"Sketches in the Sun"	03:16
10.	"Second Initial"	02:59
11.	"Concerto in D (Second Movement)"	03:08
12.	"Diary of a Man Who Vanished"	02:41
13.	"Cat Napping"	03:59
14.	"Ram"	02:29
15.	"Provence"	03:17
16.	"Winter (Second Movement)"	02:22
17.	"Meadow Rag"	02:31
18.	"Heritage"	02:39
19.	"Bareback"	03:21
20.	"Dorothy"	02:50
Total length:		59:58
