= Portraits of Bob Dylan =

Studio album by Steve Howe
- Released: 13 July 1999
- Recorded: Langley, Devon, England; Dinemec Studios, Geneva, Switzerland; Mountain Studios, Montreux, Switzerland
- Genre: Progressive rock
- Length: 57:47
- Label: Eagle
- Producer: Steve Howe

Steve Howe chronology
Pulling Strings (1999)	Portraits of Bob Dylan (1999)	Homebrew 2 (2000)

Portraits of Bob Dylan is the title of Yes guitarist Steve Howe's ninth solo album, released in 1999. The album features his son Dylan Howe on drums and several other guest artists, including current and past Yes band members Jon Anderson and Geoff Downes, performing cover versions of Bob Dylan songs. Keith West, lead singer of the 1960s band Tomorrow (in which Howe was the guitarist), sings lead on "Lay Lady Lay".

== Reception ==
AllMusic reviewer Stewart Mason gave the album 2 stars out of 5, stating "Portraits of Bob Dylan is pleasant enough, and it's a nice gesture toward an obvious hero of Howe's, but it's not even close to essential for either Dylan or Howe fans".

== Track listing ==
All tracks are written by Bob Dylan, except "Well, Well, Well" by Bob Dylan and Danny O'Keefe.

No.	Title	Lead vocals	Length
1.	"Sad Eyed Lady of the Lowlands"	Jon Anderson	12:00
2.	"Mama, You've Been on My Mind"	Steve Howe	2:33
3.	"It's All Over Now, Baby Blue"	Annie Haslam	4:32
4.	"Going, Going, Gone"	Max Bacon	3:52
5.	"Just Like a Woman"	Steve Howe	4:35
6.	"Well, Well, Well"	P. P. Arnold	4:05
7.	"The Lonesome Death of Hattie Carroll"	Dean Dyson	6:08
8.	"Lay Lady Lay"	Keith West	3:43
9.	"One Too Many Mornings"	Phoebe Snow	3:30
10.	"I Don't Believe You"	Steve Howe	4:16
11.	"Don't Think Twice, It's All Right"	Allan Clark	4:01
12.	"Buckets of Rain"	Steve Howe	3:54

== Personnel ==
=== Musicians ===
- Steve Howe – guitar, pedal steel guitar, bass, mandolin, banjo, piano, organ, keyboards, lead and backing vocals
- Dylan Howe – drums
- Geoff Downes – keyboards
- Anna Palm – violin
- Nathalie Manser – cello
- Jon Anderson – lead vocals on 1
- Annie Haslam – lead vocals on 3
- Max Bacon – lead vocals on 4
- P. P. Arnold – lead vocals on 6
- Dean Dyson – lead vocals on 7
- Keith West – lead vocals on 8
- Phoebe Snow – lead vocals on 9
- Allan Clark – lead vocals on 11

=== Production ===
- Steve Howe – producer
- Paul Sutin – engineer
- Christophe Suchet – engineer
- Dave Richards – engineer
- Kris Fredriksson – assistant engineer

== See also ==
- List of songs written by Bob Dylan
- List of artists who have covered Bob Dylan songs
