= Elements (Steve Howe album) =

Steve Howe album

Studio album by Steve Howe
- Released: 7 September 2003
- Studios: Langley Studio and Snake Ranch Studios
- Genre: Progressive rock
- Length: 60:59
- Label: Inside Out Music
- Producer: Steve Howe

Steve Howe chronology
| Skyline (2002) | Elements (2003) | Spectrum (2005) |

Professional ratings
Review scores
| Source | Rating |
|---|---|
| AllMusic | 3/5 stars |
| Scream Magazine | 4/6 stars |

Elements is the thirteenth solo studio album by guitarist Steve Howe.

== Track listing ==
| No. | Title | Length |
|---|---|---|
| 1. | "Across the Cobblestone" | 4:16 |
| 2. | "Bee Strings" | 3:21 |
| 3. | "Westwinds" | 4:29 |
| 4. | "Where I Belong" | 4:15 |
| 5. | "Whiskey Hill" | 2:00 |
| 6. | "The Chariot of Gold" | 3:23 |
| 7. | "Tremolando" | 2:09 |
| 8. | "Pacific Haze" | 7:21 |
| 9. | "Load Off My Mind" | 3:29 |
| 10. | "Hecla Lava" | 3:06 |
| 11. | "Smoke Silver" | 3:10 |
| 12. | "Inside Out Muse" | 6:53 |
| 13. | "Rising Sun" | 3:04 |
| 14. | "Sand Devil" | 4:34 |
| 15. | "The Longing" | 2:24 |
| 16. | "A Drop in the Ocean" | 3:05 |
| Total length: | | 60:59 |

== Tour ==
In March 2004, Howe toured in promotion of the record. Under the moniker "Remedy", his live band was:

- Steve Howe – vocals, electric guitar, acoustic guitar, pedal steel
- Ray Fenwick – electric guitar
- Derrick Taylor – bass guitar
- Virgil Howe – keyboards, vocals
- Dylan Howe – drums

== Credits ==
The following people appeared either in performance or production of the studio album.

- Steve Howe – vocals, electric guitar, acoustic guitar, pedal steel, dobro, mandolin, dulcimer
- Virgil Howe – keyboards, vocals
- Gilad Atzmon – alto saxophone, tenor saxophone, baritone saxophone, clarinet, flute
- Derrick Taylor – bass guitar
- Dylan Howe – drums
- Jamie Talbot – alto saxophone
- Stan Sulzmann – tenor saxophone
- Philip Todd – baritone saxophone
- Derek Watkins – trumpet
- Simon Gardner – trumpet, flugelhorn
- Mark Nightingale – trombone
- Neil Sidwell – trombone
- Cameron McBride – engineering
- Curtis Schwartz – mixing
- Andrew Jackman – arranging
