= Homebrew (Steve Howe album) =

Studio album by Steve Howe
- Released: 1996
- Genre: Progressive rock
- Length: 60:07
- Labels: Inside Out Music; Herald/Caroline Records (US)
- Producer: Steve Howe

Steve Howe chronology
Not Necessarily Acoustic (1994)	Homebrew (1996)	Quantum Guitar (1998)

Homebrew is an album released by Steve Howe in 1996. It is part of the Homebrew series. The album features new songs as well as re-arranged old songs from Howe's career. He is the only musician, as the tracks are mainly demos.

== Track listings ==
Track listing
No.	Title	Length
1.	"Sketches in the Sun"	3:10
2.	"Sharp on Attack"	3:56
3.	"The Valley of Rock"	2:39
4.	"Georgia's Theme"	3:38
5.	"Dorothy"	4:34
6.	"Meadow Rag"	1:28
7.	"At the Full Moon"	4:06
8.	"Never Stop Learning"	2:50
9.	"Red and White"	3:36
10.	"More About You"	2:53
11.	"Rare Birds"	3:10
12.	"Big Love"	4:43
13.	"Running in the Human Race"	3:55
14.	"Barren Land"	2:38
15.	"Against the Tide"	3:00
16.	"Break Away from It All"	4:32
17.	"For This Moment"	5:19
Total length:		60:07
