= Travelling (Steve Howe album) =

Live album by Steve Howe Trio
- Released: 2010
- Recorded: 2008 at Brighton, England, Montreal, Canada, and Toronto, Canada
- Genre: Jazz
- Length: 71:25
- Label: HoweSound
- Producer: Steve Howe

Steve Howe Trio chronology
The Haunted Melody (2008)	Travelling (2010)

Travelling is the first live album by English jazz group Steve Howe Trio, released in 2010 on HoweSound. It is formed of recordings from the band's 2008 tour.

== Track listing ==
1. "Blue Bash" - 6:58
2. "Dream River" - 6:09 (Steve Howe)
3. "Travelin'" - 4:50 (Kenny Burrell)
4. "The Haunted Melody" - 4:26 (Rahsaan Roland Kirk)
5. "Tune Up" - 5:49 (Miles Davis)
6. "Siberian Khatru" - 5:59 (Steve Howe / Rick Wakeman)
7. "Mood For a Day" - 7:24 (Steve Howe)
8. "He Ain't Heavy, He's My Brother" - 3:51
9. "Momenta" - 9:40 (Steve Howe)
10. "Kenny's Sound" - 5:16 (Kenny Burrell)
11. "Laughing With Larry" - 3:23 (Steve Howe)
12. "Close to the Edge" - 7:40 (Steve Howe)

== Personnel ==
- Steve Howe – guitar
- Dylan Howe – drums
- Ross Stanley – Hammond organ
