= Steve Howe =

English guitarist (born 1947)

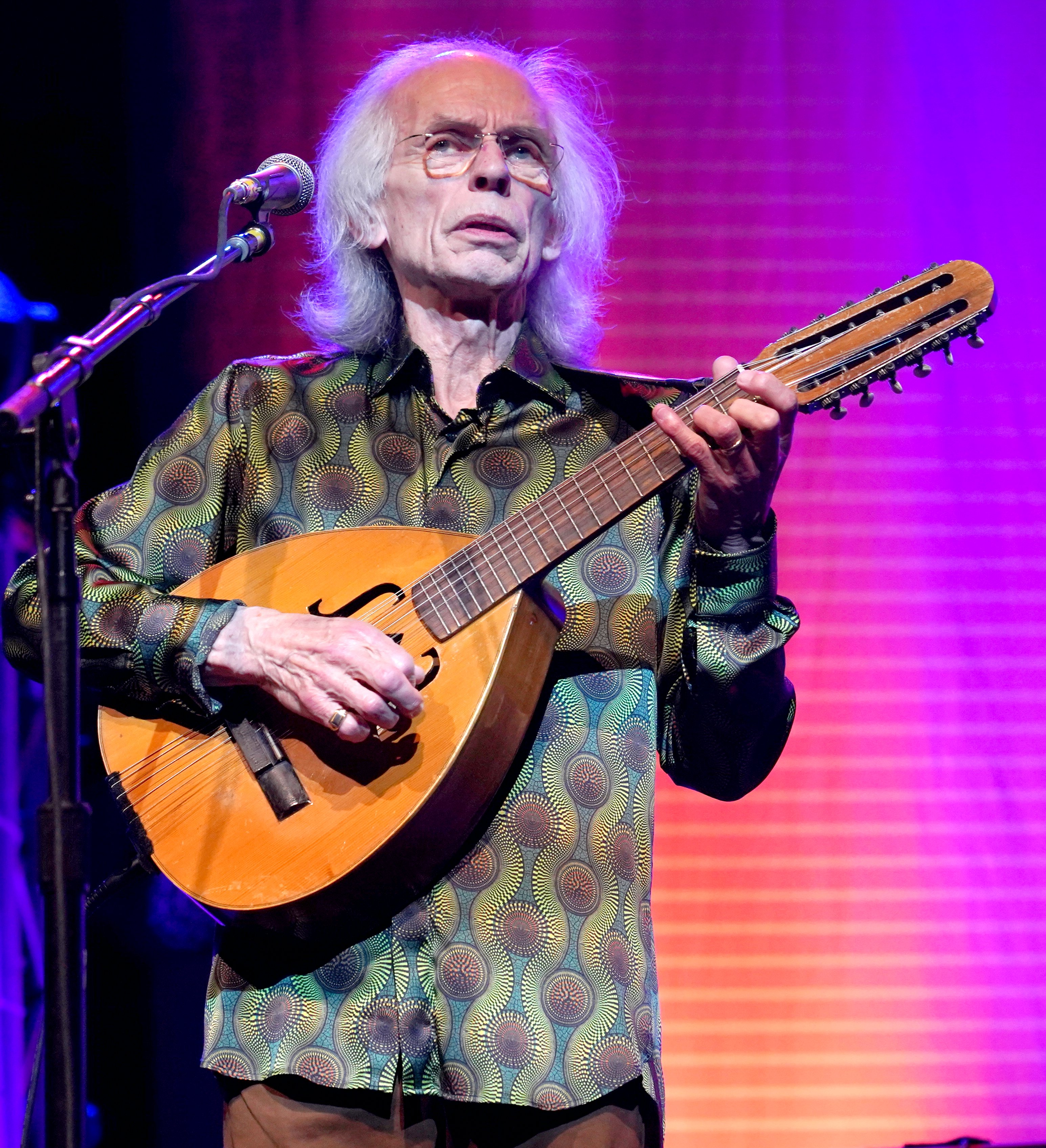
- Howe playing a Spanish laúd with Yes in 2024

Background information
- Born: Stephen James Howe; 8 April 1947 (age 79); Holloway, London, England
- Genres: Progressive rock; art rock; instrumental rock; hard rock; psychedelic rock; jazz fusion
- Occupations: Musician; songwriter; producer
- Instruments: Guitar; vocals
- Works: Steve Howe discography
- Years active: 1964–present
- Labels: Atlantic; Relativity; Eagle; InsideOut; Voiceprint; Caroline; HoweSound
- Member of: Yes
- Formerly of: The Syndicats; Tomorrow; Bodast; Asia; GTR; Anderson Bruford Wakeman Howe; Explorer's Club; Steve Howe Trio
- Website: stevehowe.com

Stephen James Howe (born 8 April 1947) is an English musician, best known as the guitarist and backing vocalist in the progressive rock band Yes across three stints since 1970. Born in Holloway, North London, Howe developed an interest in the guitar and began to learn the instrument himself at age 12. He embarked on a music career in 1964, first playing in several London-based blues, covers, and psychedelic rock bands for six years, including the Syndicats, Tomorrow, and Bodast.

Upon joining Yes in 1970, Howe's blend of acoustic and electric guitar helped shape the sound and direction of the band, leading to more commercial and critical success. Howe co-wrote many of their best-known songs, and he remained with the band until its initial dissolution in 1981. Howe returned to the group from 1990 to 1992 before returning permanently in 1995. He is the longest-serving member of the band.

Howe achieved further success in the 1980s and beyond as a member of the rock bands Asia, GTR, and Anderson Bruford Wakeman Howe. He has also had a prolific solo career, releasing 20 solo albums that achieved varied levels of success, and collaborating with artists such as Frankie Goes to Hollywood, Martin Taylor, and Queen. He continues to perform with Yes and as a solo act. He has also had a jazz group known as the Steve Howe Trio. In April 2017, Howe was inducted into the Rock and Roll Hall of Fame as a member of Yes.

== Early life ==
Howe was born on 8 April 1947 in north London, in Holloway. He grew up in a middle-class family apartment with three older siblings, brothers Phillip and John, and sister Stella, the son of Cyril Howe, head chef at The Palmerston, a Bishopsgate restaurant, and his wife Ada. Among Howe's earliest memories is marching around the home to brass band music that he played on the home stereo. He cites several influences from his parents' record collection, including Les Paul and Tennessee Ernie Ford, and also listened to classical guitar and jazz, citing Barney Kessel as a primary influence. Howe also credited Wes Montgomery and Chet Atkins, whom he first heard in 1959, as a major inspiration. Howe said he took from Atkins, "the idea that one guitarist could play any kind of guitar style." Howe was also influenced by Bob Dylan, remarking: "I think he brought out the rebel in me, and that rebel wasn't somebody who wanted to break things, but the rebel in me wanted to do my thing ... a rebellion against anything other than being me ... he became like a cult hero". Howe attended Holloway School, and later Barnsbury Boys' School in Islington, which he left in 1962, aged 15, after failing all his O-levels.

Howe wished to own a guitar at age 10, but his parents did not buy him one until they selected one with him in 1959 at a shop in Kings Cross, London at age 12 for a Christmas present. The model was an F-hole acoustic. Howe would stand by a window at home and mime his playing to passersby while music was playing indoors, until he began to teach himself without formal lessons or learning to read musical notation. The only book he read, he claimed, was Dance Band Chords for the Guitar (1946) by Eric Kershaw. After a period of practice which involved listening to records by Bill Haley & the Comets, Howe teamed with school friends and played his first gig at The Swan, a pub in Tottenham, playing a cover of "Frightened City" by the Shadows. He recalled the event as a disaster; the band did not rehearse or tune up, and Howe avoided stage performances for a while as a result. He added: "We were underage. I was painfully shy. I stood on the side of the stage, played my songs, never looked up". After he left primary school, he wished to become a guitarist and took up several part-time jobs until he wished to become a full-time musician around 18. At age 14, Howe and his friend from Tottenham started a group that played in youth clubs, eventually landing gigs in pubs and ballrooms. At one point, the band secured a short residency at HM Prison Pentonville for two nights a week.

Around 1961, Howe bought a solid body Guyatone, his first electric guitar, which was followed with a Gibson ES-175D in 1964, one of the guitars that he later became most identified with. He spoke about playing the guitar on stage: "No one was playing archtop, hollowbody guitars in a rock band. People laughed at me and thought I was really snooty. To me, it was an object of art, it wasn't just a guitar." During Yes's first visit to New York City in 1971, he slept with the guitar as his hotel was situated in a dodgy area and took it to bed "just for safety, I needed to know it was there". Before he became a full-time musician Howe took up work at a piano factory, followed by a job in a music shop. He left the shop when he began to pick up regular gigs.

== Career ==
=== 1964–1970: Early bands ===
In 1964, the 17-year-old Howe became a member of his first professional band, the North London-based rhythm and blues group the Syndicats that formed the year prior and were produced by Joe Meek. His first of three studio recordings with the band was a rendition of "Maybellene" by Chuck Berry that was released as a single with "True to Me" on its B-side, a song Howe co-wrote with their singer, Tom Ladd. The Syndicats occasionally opened for Chris Farlowe and the Thunderbirds; one night Farlowe asked Howe to step in for Albert Lee at a Wolverhampton gig when Lee was taken ill.

In 1965, Howe left the band and accepted an invitation to join the In Crowd, a soul and covers band who often played in Tottenham and released a rendition of "That's How Strong My Love Is" by Otis Redding which went to No. 48 on the UK singles chart in May 1965. The band soon renamed themselves Tomorrow and adopted a psychedelic rock sound, writing more original songs and changing their stage clothes. In 1967, they released two singles: "My White Bicycle" and "Revolution", the latter co-written by Howe. (Note: Howe recalls that Frank Zappa told him that his solo on "Claremount Lake", the B-side of "My White Bicycle" was "one of the best he'd heard".)

During the recording of a new single with producer Mark Wirtz, Howe was asked by Wirtz to record some guitar as a session musician, which pleased Howe and he felt "thrilled to bits" to take part. The session led to Howe recording a selection of singles for EMI, which included his first song "Mothballs", also known as "So Bad", and playing guitar on Keith West's single "Excerpt from A Teenage Opera" which went to No. 2 in the UK. Howe and his Tomorrow bandmates also took part in a pie fight scene in the satirical comedy film Smashing Time (1967) (where he had one line, "Let's do it!"), toured the London club circuit, sharing bills with Pink Floyd, jamming with Jimi Hendrix and playing at the Christmas on Earth concert at Earl's Court.

After Tomorrow split in 1967, Howe went on to play on several songs with their singer Keith West, including playing the bass guitar on West's "The Kid Was a Killer", and tracks with guitarist Ronnie Wood and drummer Aynsley Dunbar but neither recording got finished. In 1968, with Howe's reputation as a guitarist on the rise, he joined Bodast, a trio which also used the name of Canto for a short period. They signed a recording deal with Tetragrammaton Records and put down a selection of songs in 1969 at Trident Studios for an album with West as producer, but the label went out of business shortly before its release. The label had also promised the group film roles and visits to the US but they never materialised and they disbanded. Howe released the tracks for the proposed album after he obtained the recordings and remixed them himself as The Bodast Tapes (1981).

After Bodast split, Howe auditioned with the progressive rock band the Nice as a potential new member, but decided it was not for him, and left the next day. An audition with Jethro Tull followed, but Howe failed to turn up when he learned the guitarist they wanted would not contribute to the songwriting. Howe also had a try out with Atomic Rooster while Carl Palmer was a member but said, "it didn't quite gel." In 1970, Howe toured as a member of American soul singer P. P. Arnold's backing band, with future members of Ashton, Gardner and Dyke, which also involved American duo Delaney & Bonnie. The tour made him believe he was set "to really go somewhere in music."

=== 1970–1981: Joining Yes and start of solo career ===
In April 1970, the rock band Yes sought a new guitarist following the departure of Peter Banks. Howe was invited to a try out session with the group in Fulham, which consisted of Jon Anderson, Chris Squire, Bill Bruford, and Tony Kaye; he was successful and became a member in June. By this time, Yes had recorded their second album Time and a Word (1970) but it was not yet released. A photograph of Howe with the band was used on its cover for the American release despite his not playing on it. After several gigs, Yes retreated to Devon to rehearse and develop new material for The Yes Album (1971). Howe went on to buy Langley Farm, where the group had stayed. Howe's proficiency with a wide range of guitars, and his strong contributions to the songwriting, made him a prolific member who was an essential part of the band's change in musical direction towards progressive rock. The Yes Album and Fragile (1971) include his solo acoustic pieces "Clap" and "Mood for a Day", and writing credits for the popular tracks "Yours Is No Disgrace", "Starship Trooper", and "Roundabout". The latter earned Howe and Anderson a BMI Award for writing the song.

In 1971, Wakeman and Howe had contributed to the recording of Lou Reed's self-titled debut album as session musicians, working together for the first time on this occasion. In the summer of 1972, Howe performed one gig with Stone the Crows at the Great Western Festival in Lincoln while they sought a replacement following the death of Leslie Harvey.

To his already-formidable assortment of electric and acoustic guitar sounds, Howe added a unique approach to lap steel guitar in the next album, Close to the Edge, released in 1972. His penchant for ongoing experimentation helped produce a playing style unique among rock musicians, while the group as a whole took a position as a leading progressive rock band. Following Close to the Edge, Howe played on Tales from Topographic Oceans, Relayer, Going for the One and Tormato, with Yes becoming one of the most successful bands of the decade. Two of these five albums achieved platinum certification in the US, and the other three were certified gold.

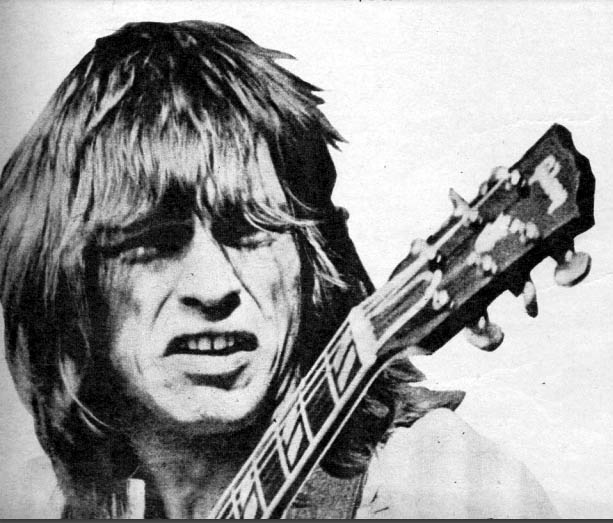
Howe in 1975

In 1975, Yes took an extended break for each member to release a solo album. Howe recorded a mixture of solo and group performed tracks for Beginnings at Morgan and Advision Studios with producer Eddy Offord and performances from Bruford, Alan White and Patrick Moraz. The album was released in October 1975 by Atlantic Records and reached No. 22 in the UK and No. 63 in the US. His second solo album, The Steve Howe Album, was released in November 1979 and included a performance by singer Claire Hamill.

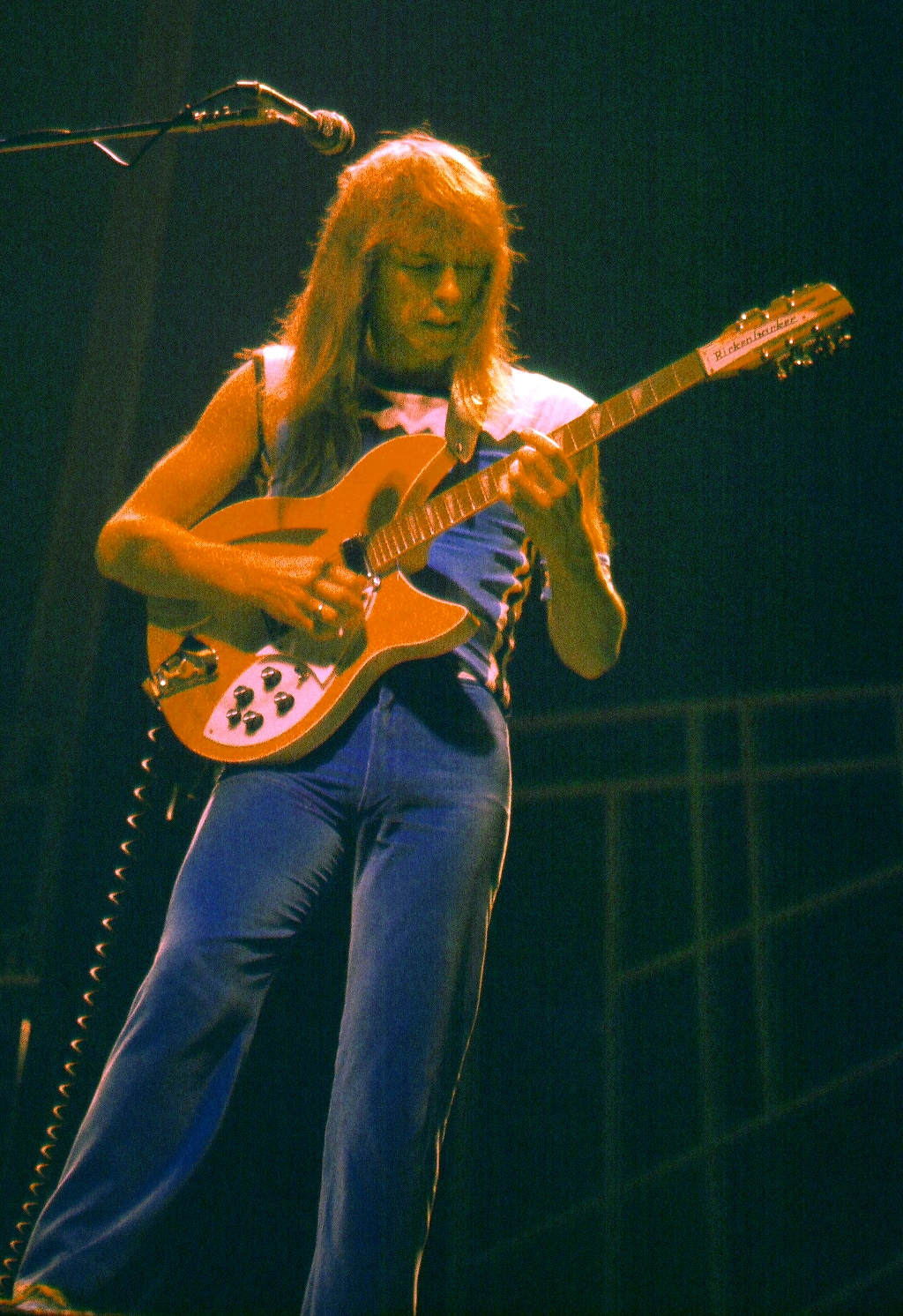
Howe playing with Yes in 1977

In early 1980, Anderson and Wakeman left the group and were replaced a few weeks later by Trevor Horn and Geoff Downes. 1980's Drama saw a stylistic change for Yes, incorporating elements of new wave into their progressive rock blend. Howe continued with the band until Yes officially split up in early 1981. (Note: According to Howe, Horn believed he had to fulfill Buggles' remaining contractual obligations, of which Downes was less certain. Squire and White decided to devote their attentions to a project with former Led Zeppelin guitarist Jimmy Page that never came to fruition. That left Howe and Downes, neither of whom wanted to take on the challenge of replacing three band members, so they decided it was time to dissolve Yes.) Although the group was back together less than a year later, Howe was not included in the new line-up.

=== 1981–1995: Asia, GTR, ABWH, and second Yes run ===
In 1981, Howe teamed with Downes, singer and bassist John Wetton, and drummer Carl Palmer to form the supergroup Asia. Their debut album, Asia (1982), was the highest selling album of 1982 in the US, with 4 million copies sold there. Howe is credited as composer on five of its nine tracks. When it came to writing their second album Alpha (1982), Howe noticed a sense of staleness and that the songs were too direct and concise which disrupted the group's creativity and musical direction. In 1983, after the album's release, Howe left the group, citing irreconcilable differences with Wetton; he said later that Wetton, upon his return to the band after leaving it during the tour when the other members confronted him about his increasing mistakes on stage (to be briefly replaced by Greg Lake), told him he was uncomfortable continuing if Howe remained in the band, and Downes and Palmer took Wetton's side. Subsequently, Howe performed an acoustic guitar solo on "Welcome to the Pleasuredome" on the 1984 same titled album by the pop group Frankie Goes to Hollywood that Horn produced. He also played on Industry Standard (1982) by the Dregs.

In 1985, Howe formed another supergroup, GTR — named after an abbreviation of the word guitar — with guitarist Steve Hackett. The idea came from Howe's manager and former Yes and Asia manager Brian Lane, who brought the two together as both wished to perform in a band after a period of solo work. They were joined by singer Max Bacon, drummer Jonathan Mover, and bassist Phil Spalding. They recorded one studio album, GTR, produced by Downes. Howe noted Hackett and himself made the conscious effort to produce a pop album without "flashy guitar solos" as it was something listeners may not wish to hear and may be classified as self-indulgent. He added: "Musically, we stayed out of each other's way and gave each other space. If egos get in the way, nobody wins." GTR was released in July 1986 on Arista Records. It reached No. 11 in the US and was certified gold, and it peaked at No. 41 in the UK. The lead single, "When the Heart Rules the Mind", went to No. 14 on the Billboard Hot 100 chart. GTR supported the album with a concert tour in 1986. At its conclusion, Hackett's interest in pursuing solo projects led to his departure. In 1987, Howe commissioned Robert Berry as Hackett's replacement, and ideas of a new band name included Steve Howe and Friends and Nero and the Trend. After several demos were recorded, the group disbanded after Berry accepted an offer to join Carl Palmer and Keith Emerson in 3; without him, Arista Records dropped GTR.

In 1988, the guitar compilation album Guitar Speak on I.R.S. Records was released which features Howe's track "Sharp on Attack". The label organised a UK tour named Night of the Guitars with Howe in the line-up, performing "Clap", "Wurm", and the all-cast encore. Howe also contributed to Transportation (1988), the first solo album by Billy Currie.

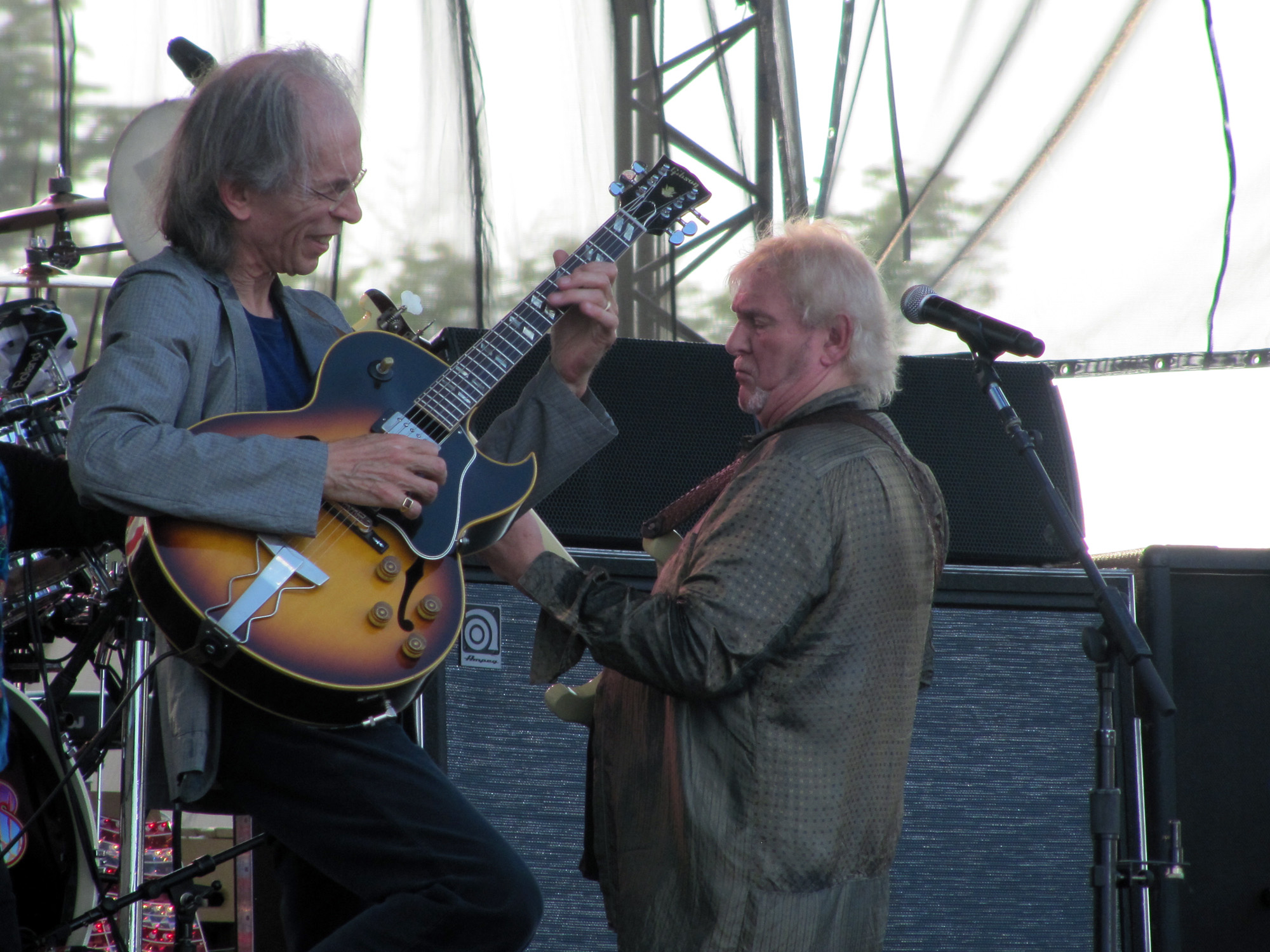
Howe playing with Yes in 2010

Later that year, Jon Anderson invited Howe to take part in a new album he wished to perform with Rick Wakeman and Bill Bruford as a new group, Anderson Bruford Wakeman Howe. In 1990, the four joined forces with the 1983–88 line-up of Yes (Chris Squire, Alan White, Trevor Rabin, and Tony Kaye) to contribute songs for the Yes album Union (1991). In 1991, he is featured on Polar Shift: A Benefit for Antarctica, a benefit jazz and ambient album to the Cousteau Society. At the end of Yes's supporting tour for Union in 1992, Howe played the guitar and co-produced Symphonic Music of Yes (1993), an album of orchestral arrangements of Yes tracks. Howe, Bruford, and Wakeman were not invited to participate in the next Yes album, Talk (1994).

During the Union tour Howe released his third solo album, Turbulence, in 1991 on Relativity Records. In a departure from his earlier two albums, Howe focused on rock instrumentals that feature Currie, Bruford, and drummer Nigel Glockler. The tracks were recorded some time before, but Howe had some difficulty in finding a record label who would release the album as the majority wanted it to include a hit single. Howe recorded a cover of "Classical Gas" with Bruford, but the track was dropped as Howe thought it did not attain the same standard as the rest of the album, which he described as "very real and original, as opposed to commercial". Howe also contributed a flamenco guitar solo to the 1991 UK number one single "Innuendo" by Queen, something he felt proud to have played on. In 1992, Downes reformed Asia which marked the return of Howe on their album Aqua (1992) playing on six of the album's 13 tracks, as well as playing on the subsequent tour as a special guest.

Howe's fourth solo album, The Grand Scheme of Things, was released in August 1993 on Relativity. Howe described the album as "quite colourful but quite personal ... There's a lot of floaty sort of ideas—spiritual". It is his first album to feature his sons Dylan and Virgil on drums and keyboards and piano, respectively. Dylan was planned to only play on a few tracks, but Howe decided to play on the entire album. Upon release, it reached No. 15 on the Billboard Top New Age Albums chart. Following the album's release, Howe began his first solo tour in 1993 which included dates in the UK and the US, and spawned his first live album, Not Necessarily Acoustic (1994). A second tour took place in late 1994 which was documented on his second live release, Pulling Strings (1998).

=== 1995–present: Third Yes run, Steve Howe Trio, and final Asia run ===
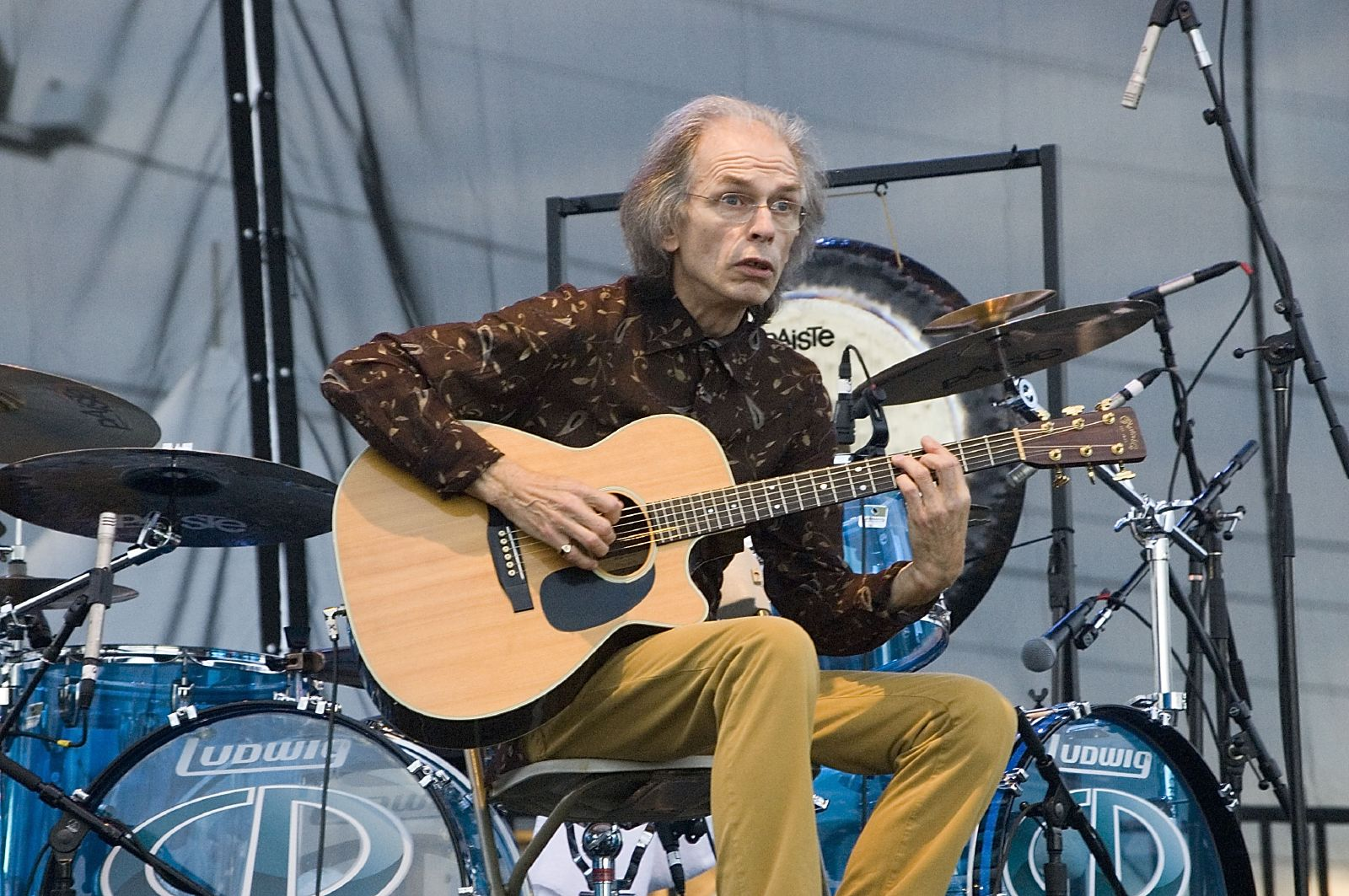
Howe playing with Asia in 2006

Howe rejoined Yes for a third time in 1995 for the recording of Keys to Ascension and Keys to Ascension 2, the two double albums containing both live and studio tracks. Since Keys to Ascension, Howe has appeared on all the albums recorded by Yes. Thereafter, over the following five years, the group released Open Your Eyes in 1997, The Ladder in 1999 and Magnification in 2001, before going on a five-year hiatus from 2004. Following their hiatus, Yes released Fly from Here in 2011, Heaven & Earth in 2014, From a Page in 2019, The Quest in 2021, Mirror to the Sky in 2023, and Aurora in 2026.

On 24 May 1996, Howe received an honorary doctorate in Musical Arts (DMA) from Five Towns College in Dix Hills, New York. Also in 1996 he played with Asia on a song called "Ginger" meant for Arena, but left off the album and released on Archiva Vol. 1 later that year. He also added his guitar to two of the songs from Aura, released in 2001.

Howe's solo album Quantum Guitar features his son Dylan on drums. In July 1999, Howe released his Bob Dylan covers album Portraits of Bob Dylan that features a variety of lead vocalists. This was followed by Homebrew 2 (2000) as a sequel to his first. When Eagle Records suggested that Howe produce an acoustic guitar album, Howe accepted and recorded Natural Timbre (2001) which contains arrangements of three Yes tracks. He considered it a breakthrough in regard to his solo output due to the time required to write and arrange strong solos.

In 2003 Howe released Elements, featuring his sons Dylan and Virgil as part of Howe's album Remedy.

In 2006, Howe rejoined Asia when the original line-up reunited for a 25th anniversary tour. They released Phoenix (2008), Omega (2010), and XXX (2012). In January 2013, Howe announced his decision to leave the band and concentrate on Yes and solo endeavours. He was replaced by Sam Coulson.

In 2007, Howe founded the Steve Howe Trio, a jazz band completed by his son Dylan on drums and Ross Stanley on Hammond organ. The Steve Howe Trio has released two albums: a studio album, The Haunted Melody in 2008 and a live album, Travelling in 2010.

In March 2015, a two-disc, 33-track collection of Howe's solo material was released as Anthology. Howe supported its release with a solo tour of the UK in April 2015.

Howe teamed up with his son Virgil for new album Nexus, released on 17 November 2017. The album was released by Steve Howe after the death of Virgil Howe in early September 2017; Virgil's death resulted in Yes suspending their ongoing Yestival tour i.e. cancelling the seven remaining dates.

Howe released his new studio album Love Is in July 2020, his first in nine years.

== Instruments and musicianship ==
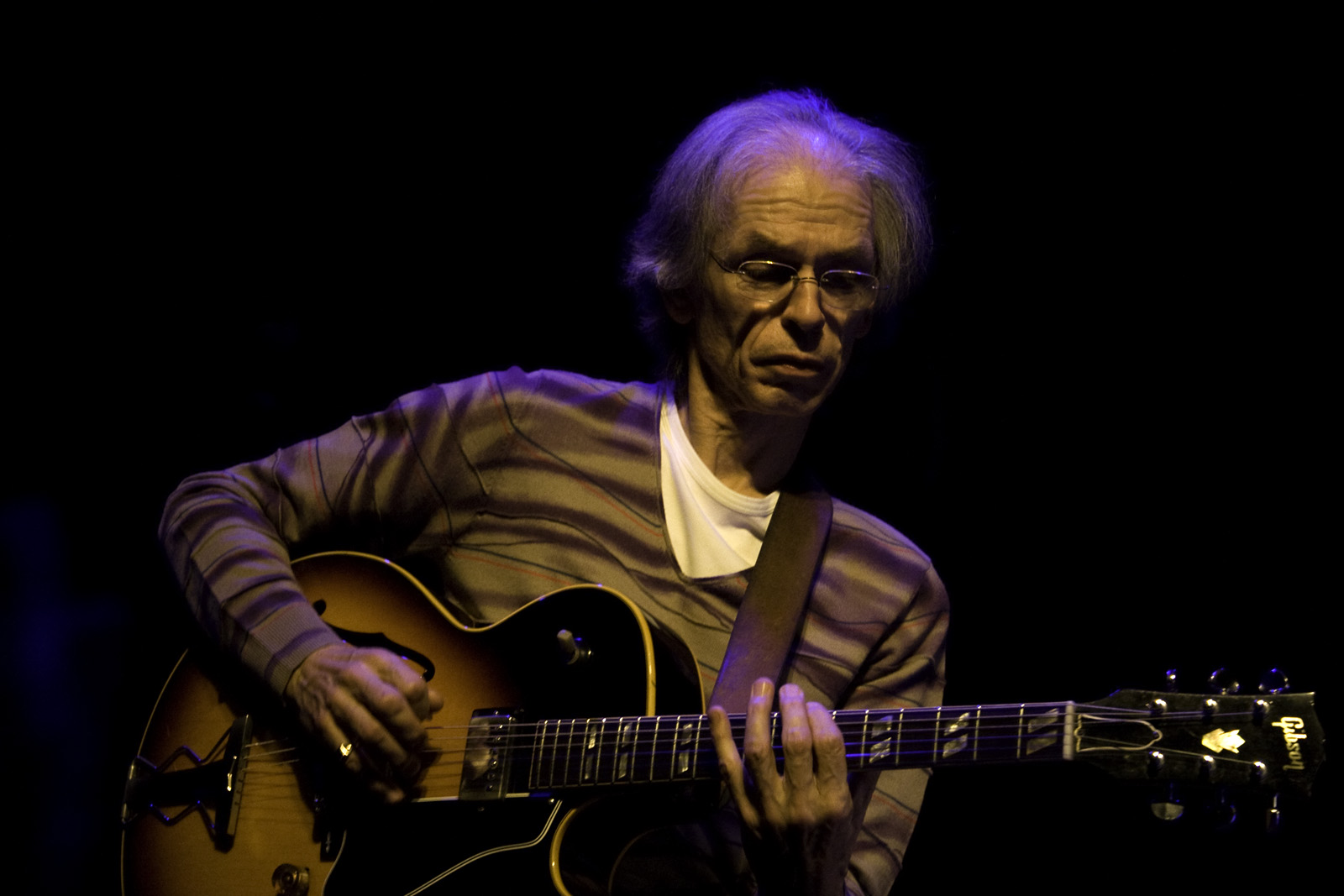
Howe playing his ES-175 at a 2008 concert

Howe became associated with the ES-175 and Gibson from the early days of his career. The In Crowd was originally to be seen performing in Michelangelo Antonioni's influential 1966 film Blow-Up, and a prop version of Howe's guitar was built for him to smash during that scene. After the band was replaced, following a single day's shooting, by the better-known Yardbirds, the guitar was kept for Jeff Beck to smash on camera.

When on tour, Howe has insisted on carrying the ES-175 with him however he travels. He has travelled on private jets and by land between shows to avoid having to check it, although he denies a rumour he bought the instrument its own seat on Concorde, noting that the cabin crew were accommodating enough to let him put it in the wardrobe in the passenger compartment. In 2010 a Virgin Atlantic gate clerk insisted Howe check the guitar over his protests; that was the last time it had to go in the hold.

On The Yes Album, his first album with the band, Howe used the ES-175 for all his electric parts save the end of "Perpetual Change", on which he plays an Antoria LG50, to get more of a Fender sound. On the next Yes album, Fragile, Howe became interested in experimenting with other Gibson guitars, and ended up playing an ES-5 Switchmaster, one of only three commercially released Gibson guitars with three pickups, on every track except "Heart of the Sunrise", where he used the ES-175. By the time the band was on tour supporting the album, Gibson offered him an endorsement deal to use their strings in exchange for a free lifetime supply (Note: Yes's manager Brian Lane later negotiated a similar deal with Martin, Howe's preferred acoustic guitar maker.) (which Howe appreciated as he restrung his guitars before every show) and a new guitar of his choice, which was the new Gibson ES-345 stereo guitar. He used it for most of the tracks on Close to the Edge, with a Gibson BR-9 steel guitar and a Danelectro Coral Sitar guitar on some sections.

For Relayer, Howe used exclusively Fender guitars, primarily a 1955 Telecaster with a Gibson humbucking pickup. On his first solo album, Beginnings, he used a banjo guitar for the first time, on "Ram". Howe played a diverse array of guitars on the next Yes album, Going for the One, including a Rickenbacker electric 12-string, pedal steel and the Telecaster on "Awaken". He switched to a Stratocaster for "Parallels" and a Gibson L-5 on the fadeout of "Wonderous Stories", as an homage to Wes Montgomery. By Drama, the last album of Yes's first iteration, Howe was using whatever type of guitar he thought worked best; he plays all the parts on that album save for the acoustic guitar on "Machine Messiah", played by Trevor Horn.

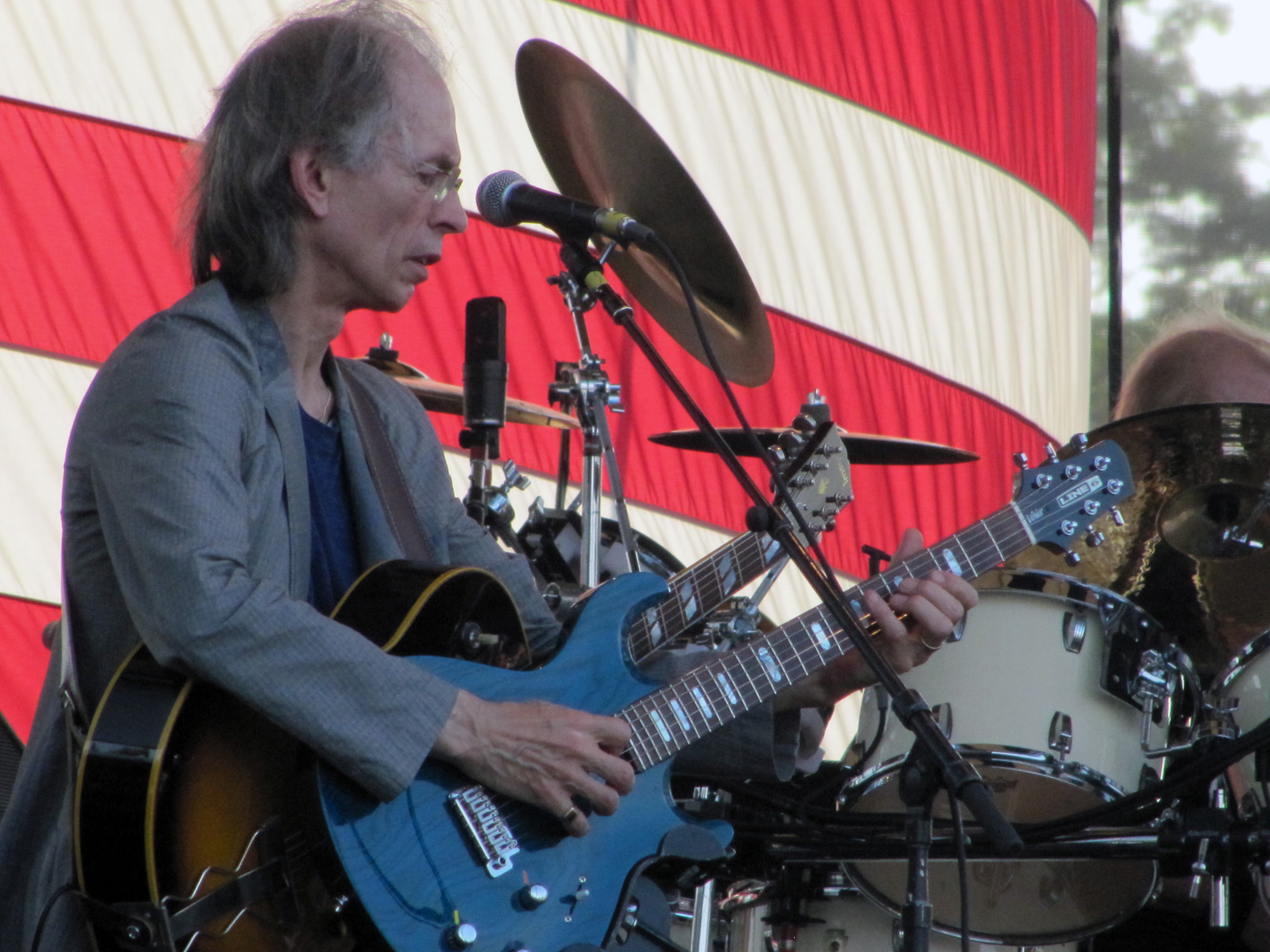
Howe playing a Line 6 Variax at a 2010 concert

Howe would bring multiple guitars on tour with him to re-create the same sound in concert that was on the original recording. In the 2000s, he began using a Line 6 digital guitar in concert which could be programmed to sound like his other guitars.

"I often say that it is only when I actually walk on stage that I fully realise I am a guitarist", Howe wrote in 2021, recalling how he had, like players he saw during his youth in the late 1960s, come to understand that he could feel free to use different guitars for different songs both on stage and in the studio. When writing songs, he has always recorded something, since in his early days he did not write music conventionally, and still has many of the original tapes.

Howe has long been interested in the details of the recording process. "The way a guitar sounds is determined by so many different factors: how you play, what you play, what you play on, what microphone is used and in what position, where and how loud the guitar is in the mix and what frequencies are added or cut during the mastering or pressing." For that reason he has insisted on producing all his own solo work. "I know what I like and what I don't like. My ears can't be deceived." Today, like Yes and other recording artists, he has come to rely on the Pro Tools software package during both production and post-production. He was the band's sole producer of The Quest (2021) and Mirror to the Sky (2023).

== Accolades ==
Howe was voted "Best Overall Guitarist" in Guitar Player magazine five years in a row (1977–1981) and in 1981 was the first rock guitar player inducted into the Guitar Player Hall of Fame. The only other two guitarists to win the "Best Overall Guitarist" category for the "Gallery of Greats" are Steve Morse and Eric Johnson.

Gibson Guitar Corporation, the maker of Howe's second electric guitar (which he was still playing forty years later), said that Howe "elevated rock guitar into an art form" and "helped define a new style of music known as art rock." In a tribute to Howe and his personal favourite ES-175 guitar, Gibson produced a Steve Howe Signature ES-175 in 2002.

Howe received a Prog God award at the 2018 Progressive Music Awards in September.

Keith Levene, one of the founder members of the Flowers of Romance, The Clash and Public Image Ltd cited Howe as one of his main influences and "the greatest fucking guitarist in the world", and progressive rock as a genre he particularly liked.

== Personal life ==
Howe started a relationship with Pat Stebbings in 1968. They married in a register office in Burnt Oak. She gave birth to his son Dylan in 1969, while living in London. They divorced within two years and Howe received custody. Dylan was a member of the Blockheads, is part of the Steve Howe Trio with his father, and toured alongside him as Yes's second drummer in 2017.

Howe married his wife Janet Osborne in 1975. They had three children: Virgil, Georgia and Stephanie. Virgil was a member of the rock/R&B band Little Barrie, and died on 11 September 2017.

In 1972, Howe became a vegetarian; since then, he and his wife have embraced the macrobiotic diet. He also avoids taking unnecessary pharmaceutical drugs, preferring alternative medicine and homeopathy. (Note: In his memoirs, Howe recalls deciding after a particularly enjoyable LSD trip he took along with then-Yes keyboardist Tony Kaye while recording The Yes Album that he would not spoil the memory by taking the drug again.) He ate his last meat meal during a North American tour with Yes in 1971.

Howe has practiced Transcendental Meditation daily since adopting it in 1983.

As a result of some accidents and near-accidents, particularly the one that injured then-keyboardist Tony Kaye badly enough to require the cast he is wearing on the cover of The Yes Album, in his early days with Yes, when the band travelled to dates around England in a small Rover, Howe has always preferred to travel by personal automobile, either driving himself or, more recently, with an "attentive" personal driver. In 1977 he bought a Bristol 411 Series 5, which he describes as "extremely high-quality ... a truly thrilling car to drive", although it had to be started with careful attention to the choke. Bristol stored it for him when he was out of the country on tour, and in 1992 he sold it back to them, with 55,000 miles (89,000 km) on it, at a profit. Since then Howe and his wife have driven, or been driven in, exclusively Mercedes-Benz products.

== Discography ==
Studio albums

- Beginnings (1975)
- The Steve Howe Album (1979)
- Turbulence (1991)
- The Grand Scheme of Things (1993)
- Mothballs (1994)
- Masterpiece Guitars with Martin Taylor (1996)
- Quantum Guitar (1998)
- Portraits of Bob Dylan (1999)
- Natural Timbre (2001)
- Skyline (2002)
- Elements (2003)
- Spectrum (2005)
- Motif (2008) – Compilation
- Time (2011)
- Love Is (2020)
- Motif Volume 2 (2023) – Compilation
- Guitarscape (2024)

Homebrew album series

- Homebrew (1996)
- Homebrew 2 (2000)
- Homebrew 3 (2005)
- Homebrew 4 (2010)
- Homebrew 5 (2013)
- Homebrew 6 (2016)
- Homebrew 7 (2021)

== Bibliography ==
- The Steve Howe Guitar Collection, Steve Howe with Tony Bacon (Photography: Miki Slingsby). First British Edition published by Balafon 1994 (ISBN 978-1-871547-64-1). A book detailing with photographs Steve Howe's collection of guitars, lutes, lyres, mandolins and pedal steel guitars.
- Steve Howe Guitar Pieces, Steve Howe tablatures, 1980, Wise Publications; rééd. éd. International Music Publications, avril 2000.

== See also ==
- List of Gibson players
