= Natural Timbre =

Studio album by Steve Howe
- Released: 14 May 2001
- Genre: Instrumental
- Length: 64:59
- Label: Eagle Records
- Producer: Steve Howe

Steve Howe chronology
Homebrew 2 (2000)	Natural Timbre (2001)	Skyline (2002)

Natural Timbre is an instrumental studio album by the rock artist Steve Howe. It was released in 2001 on Eagle Records. Steve uses only acoustic string instruments, such as guitar, mandolin and banjo. While some tracks contain only guitars, others have his son Dylan Howe on drums, Andrew Pryce Jackman on piano and glockenspiel - he used to play keyboards with a band called The Syn starring bassist Chris Squire and guitarist Peter Banks - and Anna Palm on violin. The last three tracks are instrumental interpretations of songs from the band Yes.

== Track listings ==
All tracks composed by Steve Howe; except where indicated.

No.	Title	Writer(s)	Length
1.	"Distant Seas"		6:13
2.	"Provence"		3:59
3.	"Intersection Blues"		2:27
4.	"Family Tree"		4:28
5.	"J's Theme"		3:50
6.	"In The Course Of The Day"		3:32
7.	"Dream River"		3:57
8.	"Golden Years"		4:34
9.	"The Little Galliard"	John Dowland, arranged by Howe	1:21
10.	"Up Above Somewhere"		3:54
11.	"Curls And Swirls"		2:32
12.	"Pyramidology"		3:05
13.	"Lost For Words"		3:54
14.	"Winter"	Antonio Vivaldi, arranged by Howe	2:16
15.	"Solar Winds"		3:53
16.	"Your Move"	Jon Anderson	3:26
17.	"Disillusion"	Chris Squire	1:39
18.	"To Be Over"	Jon Anderson, Steve Howe, Chris Squire, Alan White, Patrick Moraz	6:09

== Musicians ==
- Steve Howe - acoustic guitar, banjo, acoustic bass, dobro, mandolin, percussion, autoharp, koto, mandola, mandocello, lap steel guitar
- Andrew Pryce Jackman - piano, Glockenspiel
- Anna Palm - violin
- Dylan Howe - drums
