= Skyline (Steve Howe album) =

Studio album by Steve Howe
- Released: October 2002
- Genre: Instrumental
- Length: 59:58
- Label: Inside Out Music
- Producer: Steve Howe

Steve Howe chronology
Natural Timbre (2001)	Skyline (2002)	Elements (2003)

Professional ratings
Review scores
Source	Rating
Sea of Tranquility	3.5/5 stars

Skyline is an album credited solely to Steve Howe; however, the album is performed by the duo of Howe and Paul Sutin. This is the third album to feature this duo after both Seraphim (1989) and Voyagers (1995) were credited as 'Paul Sutin with Steve Howe'. The music is usually very calm and simple, which is not conventional for Howe. As Howe said in an interview, "You go through the music; there's something, there's some little thread that carries through them, and that's certainly true with this album, but the only thing is because of the mood of the music and sort of relaxness of the music, it's been harder for me to actually create the spiral that I'm trying to create."

== Track listings ==
All tracks composed by Steve Howe except where otherwise noted.

No.	Title	Writer(s)	Length
1.	"Small Acts Of Human Kindness"		4:20
2.	"Meridian Strings"	Steve Howe, Paul Sutin	5:24
3.	"Secret Arrow"	Howe, Sutin	4:22
4.	"Moon Song"	Howe, Sutin	4:26
5.	"Shifting Sands"	Howe, Sutin	5:49
6.	"Avenue De Bel Air"	Howe, Sutin	6:36
7.	"Resonance"		5:24
8.	"The Anchor"		2:48
9.	"Moment In Time"	Howe, Sutin	6:47
10.	"Simplification"		3:16
11.	"Camera Obscura"	Howe, Sutin	6:28
12.	"Small Acts"		3:49

== Personnel ==
- Steve Howe - guitars, bass, keyboards
- Paul Sutin - keyboards, percussion
