= Turbulence (Steve Howe album) =

Studio album by Steve Howe
- Released: 22 July 1991
- Recorded: 1989
- Studios: Hot Food Studios; Advision; Sarm East; Sarm West; Langley Studio
- Genres: Instrumental rock, progressive rock
- Length: 38:41
- Label: Relativity
- Producer: Steve Howe

Steve Howe chronology
The Steve Howe Album (1979)	Turbulence (1991)	The Grand Scheme of Things (1993)

Professional ratings
Review scores
Source	Rating
AllMusic	4/5 stars

Turbulence is the third studio album by Yes guitarist Steve Howe, released in 1991 through Relativity Records. It is Howe's first solo release since 1979, with his band including former Yes drummer Bill Bruford and former Ultravox keyboardist Billy Currie. The album is composed of guitar-based instrumentals, showcasing different genres that have influenced Howe. "Sensitive Chaos" contains a melody that would also be used in "I Would Have Waited Forever", the opening track to Yes' 1991 album Union. "The Inner Battle" contains a melody that would also be used in "Silent Talking" off the same Yes album. "Running the Human Race" was a track that had been developed for the band GTR's aborted second album, a version of which was later released by Max Bacon.

== Track listings ==
All music is composed by Steve Howe.

No.	Title	Length
1.	"Turbulence"	4:59
2.	"Hint Hint"	3:28
3.	"Running the Human Race"	4:23
4.	"The Inner Battle"	3:31
5.	"Novalis"	2:26
6.	"Fine Line"	3:25
7.	"Sensitive Chaos"	4:24
8.	"Corkscrew"	3:58
9.	"While Rome's Burning"	4:25
10.	"From a Place Where Time Runs Slow"	3:42
Total length:		38:41

== Personnel ==
- Steve Howe – guitar, dobro, mandolin, koto, keyboard (track 9), percussion (tracks 5, 8), bass, hurdy-gurdy, sequencing, arrangement, sound effects, engineering (tracks 5, 6, 8), production
- Billy Currie – keyboard, viola
- Andrew Lucas – organ
- Bill Bruford – drums (except tracks 3, 6 and 8)
- Nigel Glockler – drums (tracks 3, 6)
- Roger Howorth – engineering
- Tim Weidner – engineering
- Croyden Cooke – engineering
- Renny Hill – mixing
