= The Grand Scheme of Things =

Studio album by Steve Howe
- Released: 6 September 1993
- Studios: Langley, Sarm East and West, Advision, Konk and Dinemec
- Genre: Progressive rock
- Length: 58:05
- Label: Relativity
- Producer: Steve Howe

Steve Howe chronology
Turbulence (1991)	The Grand Scheme of Things (1993)	Not Necessarily Acoustic (1994)

Professional ratings
Review scores
Source	Rating
AllMusic	4/5 stars

The Grand Scheme of Things is a 1993 solo album by Yes guitarist Steve Howe. The album features seven vocal tracks and nine instrumental tracks using instruments including dobro, steel guitar, bass guitar, mandolin, keyboards, organ, Spanish guitar and anvil. The album reached No.15 in the Billboard Top New Age Albums charts.

== Track listing ==
All songs written by Steve Howe except where noted

No.	Title	Writer(s)	Length
1.	"The Grand Scheme Of Things"		5:09
2.	"Desire Comes First"		3:36
3.	"Blinded By Science"		3:28
4.	"Beautiful Ideas"		3:58
5.	"The Valley Of Rocks"		3:07
6.	"At The Gates Of The New World"		3:57
7.	"Wayward Course"		4:13
8.	"Reaching The Point"	S. Howe, Keith West	3:52
9.	"Common Ground"	Virgil Howe, S. Howe	2:15
10.	"Luck Of The Draw"		1:40
11.	"The Fall Of Civilization"	Janet Howe, S. Howe, West	4:06
12.	"Passing Phase"		3:28
13.	"Georgia's Theme"		2:44
14.	"Too Much Is Taken And Not Enough Given"		5:32
15.	"Maiden Voyage"		4:20
16.	"Road To One's Self"		2:38

== Personnel ==
Musicians:

- Steve Howe – vocals, guitars (acoustic, electric, steel, pedal steel, bass), mandolin, koto, flute, keyboards, percussion
- Keith West – harmony vocals, harmonica
- Virgil Howe – keyboards, piano
- Anna Palm – violin, vocals
- Nick Beggs – bass, stick
- Dylan Howe – drums, percussion

Production personnel:

- Martyn Dean – photography, logo, cover art
- Roger Dean – artwork, design
- Richard Edwards – mixing
- Renny Hill – engineer, mixing
- Michael Jeffries – engineer, cabassa
- Steve Rush – engineer
- Paul Wright III – engineer
