= Homebrew 2 =

Studio album by Steve Howe
- Released: 2000
- Genre: Progressive rock
- Label: Inside Out Music
- Producer: Steve Howe

Steve Howe chronology
| Portraits of Bob Dylan (1999) | Homebrew 2 (2000) | Natural Timbre (2001) |

Professional ratings
Review scores
| Source | Rating |
|---|---|
| AllMusic | 3.5/5 stars |

Homebrew 2 is Steve Howe's tenth solo album released in 2000 as part of the Homebrew series. The album features new songs as well as re-arranged old songs from Howe's career. Steve Howe is the only performer, with the exception of Beginnings, which features keyboardist Patrick Moraz on harpsichord. Five more volumes followed in 2005, 2010, 2013, 2016 and 2021.

== Track listing ==
1. "Masquerade"
2. "Success Story"
3. "Together"
4. "Rhythm of the Road"
5. "Separate Ways"
6. "Sun Carnival"
7. "Riviera"
8. "Sleepless in the City"
9. "The Spiral"
10. "The Serpentine"
11. "The Go Between"
12. "Follow Your Heart"
13. "Beginnings"
14. "Surface Tension"
15. "Every Time You Look Over Your Shoulder"
16. "Cactus Boogie"
17. "Resistance Day"
18. "Wayward Course"
19. "Spanish Heritage"
20. "Outlawed"
21. "Mules' Head Stomp"

== Personnel ==
- Steve Howe – guitar, arranger, producer, engineer, photography
- Patrick Moraz – harpsichord on Beginnings
- Greg Jackman – engineer
- Curtis Schwartz – drum programming
