= Beginnings (Steve Howe album) =

Studio album by Steve Howe
- Released: 31 October 1975
- Recorded: 1975
- Studios: Morgan and Advision Studios, London
- Genre: Rock
- Length: 39:51
- Label: Atlantic
- Producers: Steve Howe; Eddy Offord

Steve Howe chronology
Beginnings (1975)	The Steve Howe Album (1979)

Beginnings is the debut studio album by English guitarist and songwriter Steve Howe, released in October 1975 by Atlantic Records. It was recorded and released during a break in activity from the progressive rock band Yes, after they agreed for each member to produce a solo album. Howe employed various guest musicians, including past and present Yes bandmates Bill Bruford, Alan White and Patrick Moraz, plus members of Gryphon.

The album reached No. 22 on the UK Albums Chart and No. 63 on the US Billboard 200. It was supported with promotional videos of "Ram" and "Beginnings".

== Background and recording ==
In August 1975, Howe had been the guitarist in the progressive rock band Yes for five years. After the band finished touring their seventh album Relayer (1974) that month, the group agreed to take an extended break and have each member record a solo album. Howe began by selecting demos that he had collected over the years and aimed, before inviting guest musicians, to play by himself as many parts as were practicable.

== Reception ==
Professional ratings
Review scores
Source	Rating
AllMusic	2/5 stars

AllMusic's retrospective review deemed Beginnings an artistic failure, summarizing that "The playing is strong throughout, but towards what end is the mystery -- none of the songs are particularly memorable, nor is the production[...] and Howe is such a weak singer that he'd have been better off[...] sticking to instrumentals."

== Track listing ==
All lyrics and music are by Steve Howe except where noted.

Side one
No.	Title	Writer(s)	Length
1.	"Doors Of Sleep"	Steve Howe, Alice Meynell	4:05
2.	"Australia"		4:08
3.	"The Nature Of The Sea"		3:58
4.	"Lost Symphony"		4:40

Side two
No.	Title	Writer(s)	Length
5.	"Beginnings"	Steve Howe, orchestrated by Patrick Moraz	7:30
6.	"Will 'O' The Wisp"		6:00
7.	"Ram"		1:56
8.	"Pleasure Stole The Night"		2:55
9.	"Break Away From It All"		3:20

== Personnel ==
- Steve Howe – electric and acoustic guitars, bass, lap steel, mandolin, banjo, Moog, organ, washboard, vocals
- Graeme Taylor – guitar (3)
- Malcolm Bennett – bass (3), flute (8)
- Colin Gibson – bass (4)
- Chris Laurence – bass (5), double strings guitar (8)
- Patrick Moraz – piano (4), grand piano (4–6), harpsichord on (5), Mellotron on (6)
- Bud Beadle – alto & baritone saxophones (4)
- Mick Eve – tenor saxophone (4)
- Patrick Halling, William Reid – violin (5)
- John Meek – viola (5)
- Peter Halling – cello (5)
- James Gregory – piccolo flute (5)
- Sidney Sutcliffe – oboe (5)
- Gwyn Brooke – bassoon (5)
- Alan White – drums (1, 2, 4–6)
- Dave Oberlé – drums (3)
- Bill Bruford – drums (8, 9), percussion (9)

== Charts ==
Chart (1976)	Peak position
Dutch Albums (Album Top 100)	14
Swedish Albums (Sverigetopplistan)	49
UK Albums (Official Charts)	22
US Billboard 200	63

== Certifications ==
Region	Certification	Certified units/sales
United Kingdom (BPI)	Silver	60,000^{^}
^{^} Shipments figures based on certification alone.
