= Not Necessarily Acoustic =

Live album by Steve Howe
- Released: 29 November 1994
- Genre: Progressive rock
- Label: Thunderbird
- Producer: Steve Howe

Steve Howe chronology
The Grand Scheme of Things (1993)	Not Necessarily Acoustic (1994)	Homebrew (1996)

Professional ratings
Review scores
Source	Rating
AllMusic	4.5/5 stars

Not Necessarily Acoustic is a live album recorded on Steve Howe's first solo tour and released in 1994.

== Track listing ==
All songs written by Steve Howe except where noted.

1. "The Valley of Rocks" – 3:03
2. "Heritage" – 2:32
3. "Arada" (Federico Moreno Tórroba; arr. Howe) – 1:08
4. "Country Mix - a. White Silver Sands b. Green Bay Polka c. Steel Guitar Rag d. Darling, Je Vous Aime Beaucoup e. Blue Steel Blues" (a. Charles "Red" Mathews, b. Traditional, c. Leon McAuliffe, Cliff Stone, Merle Travis, d. Anna Sosenko, e. Ted Daffan) – 2:57
5. "Excerpts from Tales from Topographic Oceans" (Jon Anderson, Howe, Chris Squire, Rick Wakeman, Alan White) – 9:18
6. "Bareback" – 2:42
7. "Sketches in the Sun" – 2:58
8. "Cactus Boogie" – 2:09
9. "Second Initial" – 2:47
10. "Corkscrew" – 3:45
11. "The Glory of Love" (Billy Hill) – 1:14
12. "Dorothy" – 2:10
13. "Meadow Rag" – 2:26
14. "Concerto In D. 2nd Movement" (Vivaldi; arr. Howe) – 2:34
15. "Surface Tension" - 3:22
16. "Masquerade" – 2:03
17. "Mood for a Day" – 2:59
18. "Swedish Rhapsody No. 1" (Hugo Alfvén) – 0:53
19. "Whispering" (Vincent Rose, John Schoenberger, Richard Coburn) – 1:00
20. "Roundabout" (Anderson, Howe) – 2:33
21. "Ram" – 1:51
22. "Clap" – 3:43

== Personnel ==
- Steve Howe – Scharpach 6-string acoustic (tracks 1, 4, 8, 9, 11, 20, 21, 22); Martin 12-string acoustic (tracks 7, 16); Kohno Model 10 classical guitar (tracks 2, 3, 5, 10, 14, 15, 17); Steinberger 6-string electric (tracks 6, 12, 13, 18, 19)
- Toby Alington – editing, mixing
- Roger Dean – graphic design, design, paintings, logo, logo design
- Doug Gottlieb – liner notes
- Tim Handley – post production
- Simon Pressey – engineer
- Miki Slingsby – photography
- Mark Stratford – production coordination
- Dave Wilkerson – engineer, liner notes
- Produced by Steve Howe
