= The Steve Howe Album =

Studio album by Steve Howe
- Released: November 1979 (UK); January 1980 (US)
- Recorded: 1979
- Genre: Progressive rock
- Length: 39:02
- Label: Atlantic
- Producer: Steve Howe

Steve Howe chronology
Beginnings (1975)	The Steve Howe Album (1979)	Turbulence (1991)

CD reissue cover

The Steve Howe Album is Yes guitarist Steve Howe's second solo album. It was released in 1979. The album features Yes band members Alan White, Bill Bruford and Patrick Moraz. Also featured is Jethro Tull's former drummer Clive Bunker on percussion on "Cactus Boogie." Ronnie Leahy is also featured on keyboards for two songs; he would later play with Jon Anderson on his second solo album, Song of Seven in 1980.

== Critical reception ==
Professional ratings
Review scores
Source	Rating
AllMusic	4.5/5 stars

The Globe and Mail wrote that the album "is a nightmare in over-dubs, and despite the fact that Howe's playing ... is technically precise, it has all the passion of a chess match between two computers." AllMusic, on the other hand, said that this "is his most essential recording" and "a culmination of everything Howe represents, every genre of music he loves so dearly, exquisitely played and arranged."

== Track listing ==
All songs written by Steve Howe except where noted

Side one
No.	Title	Writer(s)	Length
1.	"Pennants"		4:32
2.	"Cactus Boogie"		2:00
3.	"All's A Chord"		4:56
4.	"Diary Of A Man Who Disappeared"	Leoš Janáček; arranged by Steve Howe	2:35
5.	"Look Over Your Shoulder"		5:00

Side two
No.	Title	Writer(s)	Length
6.	"Meadow Rag"		2:40
7.	"The Continental"	Con Conrad, Herb Magidson	2:50
8.	"Surface Tension"		3:25
9.	"Double Rondo"	music by Steve Howe; orchestrated by Andrew Jackman	8:12
10.	"Concerto In D (2nd Movement)"	Vivaldi; arranged by Steve Howe	4:50

== Personnel ==
- Steve Howe – guitars (acoustic, electric, bass, Spanish, Danelectro electric sitar, pedal steel), mandolin, six-string banjo, Moog synthesizer, vocals (3)
- Claire Hamill – vocals (5)
- Ronnie Leahy – Korg & ARP synthesizers, Hammond organ (1, 5)
- Patrick Moraz – piano (3)
- Alan White – drums (1, 5)
- Bill Bruford – drums (3)
- Clive Bunker – percussion (2)
- Graham Preskett – violin (7)
- 59 piece classical orchestra arranged and conducted by Andrew Jackman (9)
- String ensemble (10)

== Guitars used on the recording ==
The inner part of the gatefold album artwork features pictures of the guitars that were used during the recording and a legend to indicate the tracks on which they were played. The photographs of the guitars are credited to Miki Slingsby.

Guitar	1	2	3	4	5	6	7	8	9	10
Kohno Spanish Guitar			x					x		x
Martin 0018			x		x	x				
Gibson EB6 Bass	x	x	x		x					
Gibson The Les Paul									x	x
Fender Stratocaster				x	x					
Gibson Florentine Electric Mandolin	x									
Martin Mandolin			x							
Danelectro Electric sitar			x		x					
Bacon & Day Banjo guitar		x	x							
Gibson Les Paul Recording		x								
Gibson ES 175 D			x				x			
Fender Telecaster	x									
Sho-Bud Pedal Steel		x	x		x					
Fender Twin Neck Steel	x									

== Charts ==
Chart (1979)	Peak position
UK Albums (Official Charts)	68
US Billboard 200	164
