= The Haunted Melody =

Studio album by Steve Howe Trio
- Released: 2008
- Recorded: 7–8 October 2007 at Langley Studios, Devon, England
- Genre: Jazz
- Length: 57 min
- Label: HoweSound
- Producer: Steve Howe

Steve Howe Trio chronology
| The Haunted Melody (2008) | Travelling (2010) |

The Haunted Melody is the first studio album by the English jazz group Steve Howe Trio, released in November 2008 on HoweSound.

== Track listing ==
1. "Kenny's Sound" (4:38) (Kenny Burrell)
2. "Mood for a Day" (5:46) (Steve Howe)
3. "The Haunted Melody" (4:33) (Roland Kirk)
4. "Siberian Khatru" (5:02) (Jon Anderson, Steve Howe, Rick Wakeman)
5. "Blue Bash" (6:08) (Jimmy Smith)
6. "Momenta" (7:32) (Steve Howe)
7. "Laughing With Larry" (3:36) (Steve Howe)
8. "Travelin'" (5:02) (Kenny Burrell)
9. "Dream River" (5:36) (Steve Howe)
10. "Close to the Edge" (4:49) (Jon Anderson, Steve Howe)
11. "Sweet Thunder" (4:53) (Steve Howe)

== Personnel ==
- Steve Howe – guitar
- Dylan Howe – drums
- Ross Stanley – Hammond organ
