= Spectrum (Steve Howe album) =

Studio album by Steve Howe
- Released: 2005
- Genre: Progressive rock
- Length: 60:06
- Label: InsideOut Music
- Producer: Steve Howe

Steve Howe chronology
| Elements (2003) | Spectrum (2005) | Motif, Vol.1 (2008) |

Spectrum is an instrumental album released by guitarist Steve Howe in 2005.

Howe's band includes his sons Dylan on drums and Virgil on Moog synthesizer; as well as Tony Levin on bass guitar and Oliver Wakeman on organ, synthesizer and piano. The album features guitar-based instrumentals, showing many different genres that influenced Howe.

== Track listings ==
All tracks composed by Steve Howe.

| No. | Title | Length |
|---|---|---|
| 1. | "Tigers Den" | 3:46 |
| 2. | "Labyrinth" | 3:57 |
| 3. | "Band Of Light" | 3:34 |
| 4. | "Ultra Definition" | 3:39 |
| 5. | "Raga Of Our Times" | 4:12 |
| 6. | "Ebb And Flow" | 4:03 |
| 7. | "Realm Thirteen" | 4:27 |
| 8. | "Without Doubt" | 3:45 |
| 9. | "Highly Strung" | 4:30 |
| 10. | "Hour Of Need" | 5:13 |
| 11. | "Fools Gold" | 4:05 |
| 12. | "Where Words Fail" | 4:16 |
| 13. | "In The Skyway" | 3:13 |
| 14. | "Livelihood" | 3:34 |
| 15. | "Free Rein" | 3:52 |

== Personnel ==
- Steve Howe - guitars, bass on (2, 4, 5, 6, 8, 9, 11, 14), keyboards on (8), percussions
- Oliver Wakeman - organ on (1, 2, 4) synthesizer on (2), piano on (1, 2, 4, 14)
- Virgil Howe - Moog synthesizer on (6, 9)
- Tony Levin - bass on (1, 3, 7, 10, 12, 13, 15)
- Dylan Howe - drums
