= Dylan Howe =

English drummer, bandleader and composer

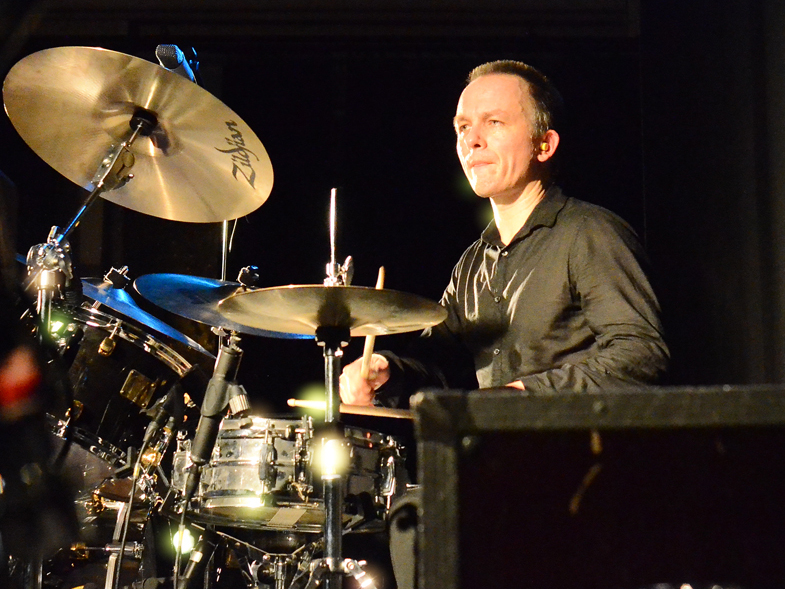
- Howe live in 2014

Background information
- Birth name: Dylan Lee Howe
- Born: 4 August 1969 (age 55); Finchley, London, England
- Origin: London, England
- Genres: Jazz; rock; contemporary; pop
- Occupations: Bandleader; composer; session musician
- Instrument: Drums
- Website: dylanhowe.com

Dylan Lee Howe (born 4 August 1969) is an English drummer, bandleader, session musician and composer. The son of guitarist Steve Howe with whom he has sometimes collaborated, Dylan is also noted for his work with rock band the Blockheads (both before and after the death of singer Ian Dury), in addition to his own work as a jazz bandleader and prolific session work with a variety of musicians. He was also the brother of musician Virgil Howe.

== Early life ==
Howe grew up in Hampstead, London, and is the eldest son of Yes guitarist Steve Howe and his first wife, Patricia Stebbings. His half brother was Virgil Howe.

Named after Dylan Thomas and Bob Dylan, Steve Howe's guitar instrumental "Clap" was written for him.

Howe attended King Alfred School from 1975 to 1986. He began drumming at the age of 10, and although he briefly studied with Bob Armstrong, Bill Bruford, and Jonathan Mover; he is primarily self-taught. During this time, Howe spent a year living with his family in Montreux, Switzerland, for the recording of Yes's Going for the One album. It was during this time he first attended the Montreux Jazz Festival.

When Howe was 13, his parents took him to see Buddy Rich and his big band at Ronnie Scott's Jazz Club – he cites this as the moment when he knew that he wanted to become a jazz drummer.

Throughout his teens, Howe played in various groups in North London. His first gigs were at King Alfred School (1981) and University College School (1982). The groups' repertoires mainly consisted of covers of The Clash, David Bowie, Bauhaus and U2 songs, supplemented with original material. Dylan left King Alfred School with three O-level passes in 1986. He worked as a window cleaner and sales assistant in various shops (for Katharine Hamnett and others) until 1988 when he started working as a professional musician.

Howe married music writer Zoë Howe in November 2006.

== Career ==
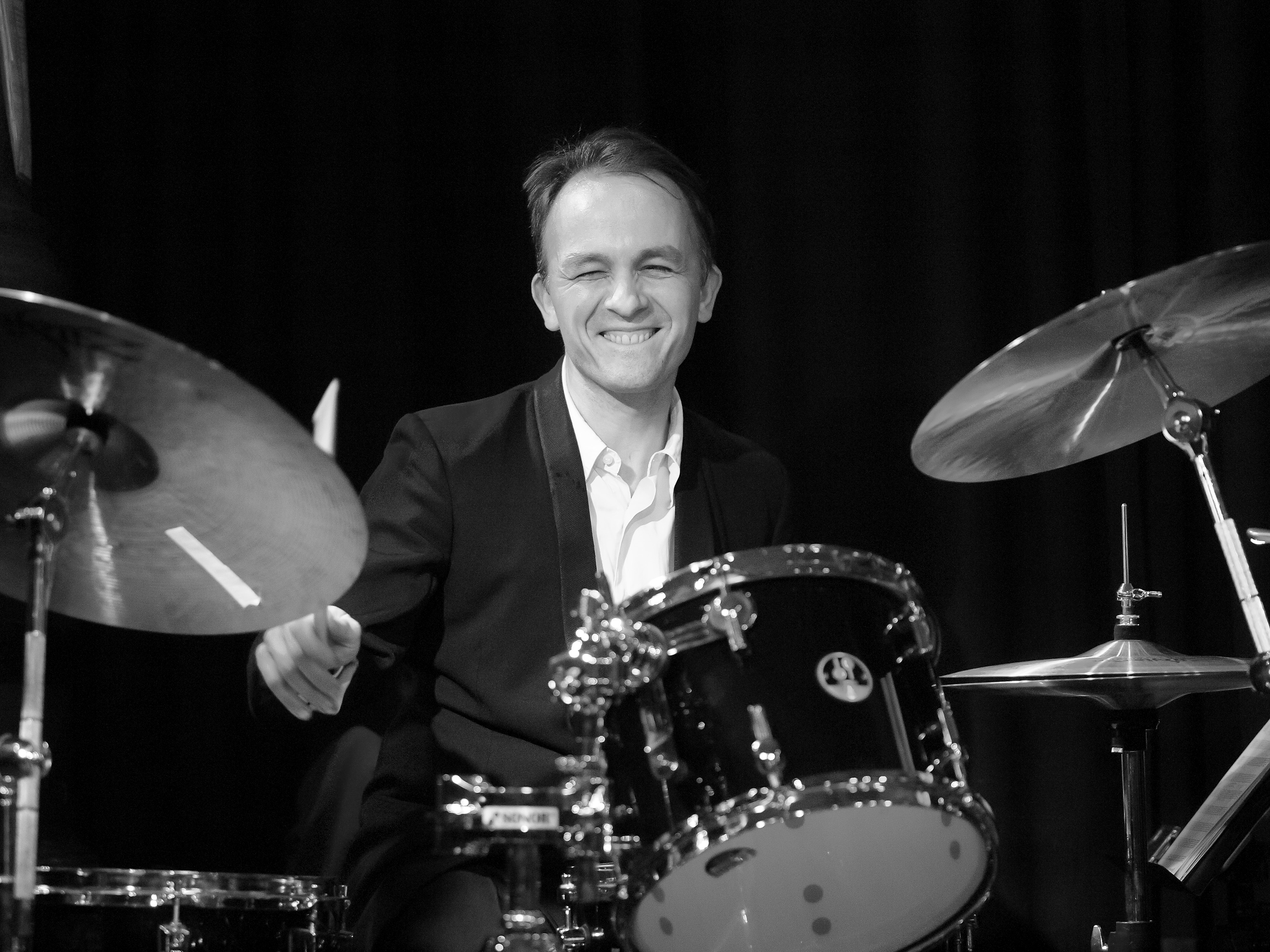
Howe playing jazz in 2012

In 1989, Howe ran nights at (now-defunct) jazz club The Shack on Tisbury Court, Soho and started playing regularly at West End jam session/house band club nights at venues including The Limelight. It was around this time that he joined flautist Philip Bent's group.

Howe was the in-house drummer for weekly club nights in London including 'Songwriters' at The Orange in West Kensington, London, backing many artists including Chaka Khan and Howard Jones. He was also house drummer for Channel Four series "Packing Them In" hosted by Frank Skinner in 1992.

In 1996, Howe joined the house band for the Channel 4 light entertainment series Light Lunch and its subsequent spin-off Late Lunch, presented by comedians Mel and Sue.

Howe joined Yes as drummer, along with Alan White, on their 2017 Yestival tour.

=== The Blockheads ===
Howe joined Ian Dury and the Blockheads in 1997 and – following Dury's death in 2000 – continued playing in The Blockheads, appearing on the albums Ten More Turnips from the Tip, Brand New Boots and Panties (2001) and Where's the Party (2004).

=== Steve Howe ===
Howe has worked on several projects with his father Steve, drumming on a number of his solo albums:

- The Grand Scheme of Things, (1993)
- Quantum Guitar, (1998)
- Portraits of Bob Dylan, (1999)
- Natural Timbre, (2001)
- Elements, (2003)
- Spectrum, (2005)
- Remedy Live DVD, (2005)
- The Haunted Melody (The Steve Howe Trio), 2008
- Travelling (The Steve Howe Trio), 2010
- New Frontier (The Steve Howe Trio), 2019
- Love Is, 2020
- Homebrew 7, 2021

Steve, Dylan and his late brother Virgil Howe were in Steve Howe's Remedy band in a 2004 European tour. The Steve Howe Trio was formed in 2007 with Steve, Dylan and Ross Stanley on Hammond organ. They toured the UK in May 2007 and June 2008 to promote their debut album The Haunted Melody.

=== Wilko Johnson ===
Howe replaced Steve Monti as drummer in the Wilko Johnson Band, with Johnson on guitar and vocals, and Norman Watt-Roy on bass. He features on Johnson's albums The Best of Wilko Johnson Volume 1, The Best of Wilko Johnson Volume 2 and Blow Your Mind, as well as Going Back Home with Roger Daltrey.

=== As bandleader ===
==== Dylan Howe Quintet ====
Howe formed his jazz quintet in 2003 and has released four solo albums:

- The Way I Hear It (2003)
- This Is It (2004)
- Translation – Recorded Live In Soho – Volume 1 (2006)
- Translation – Volume 2 – Standards (2007)

The quintet has had a changing membership, but has primarily consisted of Howe, Quentin Collins (trumpet), Brandon Allen (tenor sax), Ross Stanley (piano) and Chris Hill (double bass). Jazz fusion musician Robert Wyatt has previously provided vocals to live performances. This Is It featured as The Guardian's album of the week in November 2004, and The Observer commented on Howe's "needle-sharp" drum fills on the live Translation album.

In November 2007, Howe disbanded the quintet to focus on alternative projects, including Dylan Howe's Unity 4 with Tony Kofi, Mike Outram and Ross Stanley, culminating in a 15 date UK tour in June 2008.

In 2009, Howe and piano player Will Butterworth formed a duo and started work on their arrangements of Igor Stravinsky's Rite of Spring and Firebird Suite. The duo released their first album in 2010; Dylan Howe / Will Butterworth Duo Stravinsky – The Rite Of Spring – Part 1 to good reviews. They are currently working on a followup with a larger lineup.

In February 2010, Howe put together a successful 25 date UK tour with a quartet featuring Brandon Allen, Ross Stanley and Tim Thornton and is currently working on a new studio album featuring his arrangements of David Bowie's music from his album Low to be released in 2013.

==== The Subterraneans ====
Howe began Dylan Howe and the Subterraneans in 2007, playing the music of David Bowie's Low and Heroes. Dubbed a "future jazz sextet with strings and electronics", they launched with a live show at London's Cargo for The 2007 London Jazz Festival and a preview release of one piece on Translation – Volume 2. The group featured guest singer Hugh Cornwell, Portishead guitarist Adrian Utley and saxophonist Gilad Atzmon.

An album, Subterranean - New Designs on Bowie's Berlin, was released in 2014 on Motorik Recordings label. Musicians are Mark Hodgson and Nick Pini on double bass, Ross Stanley on piano and synths, Julian Siegel and Brandon Allen on saxophone and Adrian Utley on guitar intro on Warszawa. As for Dylan Howe, he plays drums throughout the album, as well as synths on two pieces, "Neuköln Day" and "Moss Garden". And Dylan's father, Steve Howe plays koto on "Moss Garden".

=== Session work ===
Howe has played on over 60 albums, including work with producers Trevor Horn, Nigel Godrich, John Leckie and Guy Chambers.

Howe has contributed to movie soundtracks, including The BAFTA nominated Ian Dury biopic: Sex & Drugs & Rock & Roll, Bridget Jones's Diary, Bridget Jones: The Edge of Reason, I Am Sam and Confetti.

Howe's pop and rock session work has included Paul McCartney, Ray Davies, Tom Jones, Gabrielle, Nick Cave, Hugh Cornwell, David Gilmour, Mick Jones, Damon Albarn, Lewis Taylor, Beth Gibbons, Alison Moyet, Sarah Brightman, Beth Rowley, Leon Ware, Sam Moore, Ben E King, Slits guitarist Viv Albertine and Miles Kane among others.

In 2012 Howe toured the US, Canada and Europe with Bristol-based band Get the Blessing, deputising for drummer Clive Deamer.
