= Time (Steve Howe album) =

Studio album by Steve Howe
- Released: 2011
- Genres: Progressive rock, classical music
- Length: 53:11
- Producer: Paul K. Joyce/Steve Howe

Steve Howe chronology
Homebrew 4 (2010)	Time (2011)	Homebrew 5 (2013)

Professional ratings
Review scores
Source	Rating
PopMatters	(6/10)
Record Collector	4/5 stars

Time is an instrumental album released by Steve Howe in 2011.

== Track listings ==
No.	Title	Length
1.	"Bachianas Brasileiras No. 5 (Aria)"	3:58
2.	"King's Ransom"	4:31
3.	"Cantata No. 140 (Wachet Auf)"	3:57
4.	"Orange"	2:43
5.	"Purification"	3:52
6.	"Rose"	3:41
7.	"The Explorer"	5:09
8.	"Kindred Spirits"	5:10
9.	"Concerto Grosso in D Minor Op. 3, No. 11"	5:24
10.	"The 3rd of March"	5:51
11.	"Steam Age"	3:12
12.	"Apollo"	4:43

== Personnel ==
- Steve Howe - guitars
- Paul K. Joyce - keyboards and arrangements
- Virgil Howe - keyboards on Kindred Spirits
- Classical Ensemble (uncredited musicians)
