= Virgil Howe =

British musician

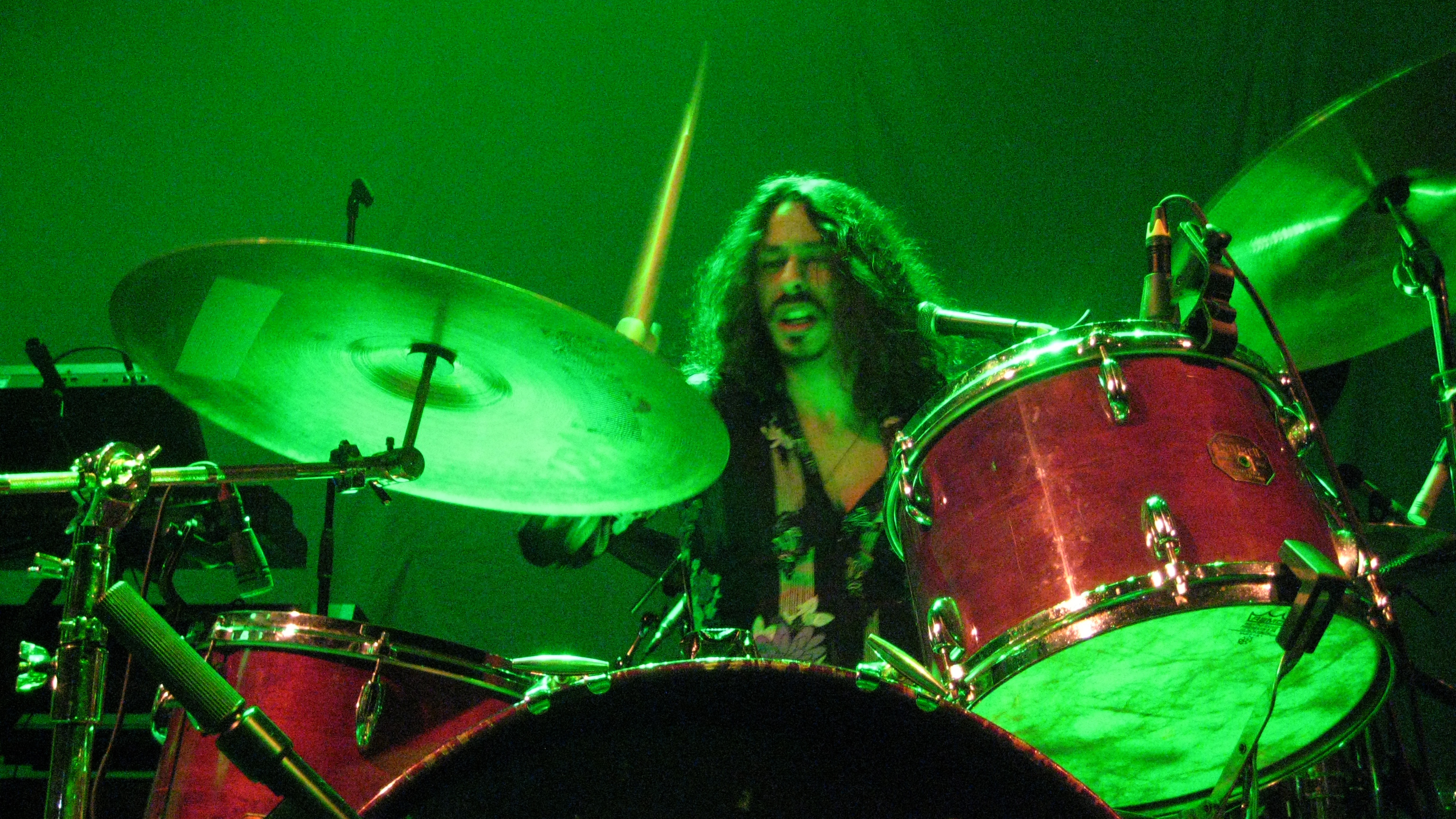
- Howe in September 2011

Background information
- Born: 23 September 1975; London, England
- Died: 11 September 2017 (aged 41)
- Occupations: Musician
- Instruments: Drums; keyboards; vocals
- Formerly of: Little Barrie; Steve Howe Band

Virgil Howe (23 September 1975 – 11 September 2017) was a British musician best known for his work as a member of Little Barrie. He was the son of Steve Howe, guitarist and long-time member of Yes.

== Career ==
Born in London, Virgil Howe was the second son of guitarist Steve Howe. He played on several of his father's projects: he performed on keys, alongside his half-brother Dylan Howe on drums, for the Steve Howe solo albums The Grand Scheme of Things (1993) and Spectrum (2005). He was in Steve Howe's Remedy band, who released an album Elements (2003), toured the UK and then released a live DVD. He wrote and performed on a piece on his father's 2011 release Time. He also plays drums on 11 tracks of Steve Howe's Anthology 2: Groups and Collaborations that were largely recorded in the 1980s. Under the name The Verge, Virgil Howe produced the Yes Remixes album, released 2003.

Howe was in The Dirty Feel, with Kerim 'Kez' Gunes (bass, vocals) and Nick Hirsch (guitar, vocals; died 2012). A debut single, "Get Down and Love In", had a limited UK release in 2004. They were signed to DirtE. In 2005, the band took part in MTV's A-Cut amateur band competition. In 2005, Howe formed a related band The Killer Meters with again Gunes on bass and Hirsch on guitar, with Karime Kendra (vocals), Henry Broadbent (keyboards) and Stephen Wilcock (saxophone). They released a tribute album to The Meters and then signed to Breaking Bread records in 2008, releasing an original album.

Howe also worked for a period with psychedelic group Amorphous Androgynous, fronted by Garry Cobain of The Future Sound of London.

Howe produced under his own name, having previously produced under the name "Sparo", under which he released the album Sparo Worlds. He also played DJ sets in London, and a regular radio show for Soho Radio.

In 2008, Howe joined band Little Barrie as a drummer. Between 2009 and October 2010 the band wrote and recorded their third album King of the Waves, working again with Edwyn Collins, Seb Lewsley at the controls and Shawn Lee mixing. Chris Potter mastered the album. The first single off King of the Waves was "Surf Hell". This track was featured as the theme tune to the 2011 Channel 4 series Sirens and an advert for Rimmel "scandal eyes" mascara; it was also playable on the multi-platform video game "Rocksmith". The album was released in the UK on 27 June 2011 and in the US on 28 February 2012. After touring with Charles Bradley in Spain, Little Barrie was invited onto his North American Tour in early 2012. The band went on to do the theme music for the TV series Better Call Saul.

Howe worked as a session musician on the Pet Shop Boys album Fundamental and for Demis Roussos.

Nexus, released 17 November 2017 on InsideOut, is a joint album by Virgil & Steve Howe. Steve described the album: "Most of the credit goes to Virgil on this; it's Virgil's bed and melodies but I've come in to add a little bit more."

== Personal life ==
Howe married fashion model Jen Dawson in 2007 and they had a daughter in September 2012. They separated in 2015. Howe died unexpectedly of a heart attack in September 2017 at the age of 41, shortly before Little Barrie were scheduled to embark on a tour for their fourth album, Death Express.

== Discography ==
=== Main projects ===
- The Verge/Yes: Yes Remixes, 2003
- Virgil Howe: "Someday", 2009 (single)
- Virgil Howe & Malcolm Catto: "B-Boy Bounce", 2010 (single)
- Virgil Howe & Mark Claydon: "The Claydon Break", 2011 (single)
- Virgil Howe & Shawn Lee: "Electronic Brain Break", 2011 (single)
- Virgil & Steve Howe: Nexus, 2017
- Virgil & Steve Howe: Lunar Mist, 2022

=== The Dirty Feel ===
- "Get Down and Love In", 2004 (single)
- Talk in the City (EP)

=== As Sparo ===
- Geniac
- Sparo Worlds (mix CD)
  - "Astroscience" (single)
  - "The Falling" (single)

=== The Killer Meters ===
- A Tribute to the Meters, 2005
  - "Dance Move Shake!", 2008 (single)
  - "Freak" (single)
- Breakin' Out!
  - "Rainbow of Love", 2017 (single)

=== Little Barrie ===
- King of the Waves, 2010
  - "Surf Hell", 2011 (single)
  - "How Come", 2011 (single)
- Shadow, 2013
  - "Fuzz Bomb", 2014 (single)
  - "I.5.C.A.", 2016 (single)
- Death Express, 2017
  - "Produkt", 2017 (single)

Also appear on:

- Better Call Saul—Original Television Soundtrack: Season 1, 2015

=== Steve Howe ===
- The Grand Scheme of Things, 1993
- Spectrum, 2005
- Elements, 2003
- Remedy Live, 2002 (DVD)
- Time, 2011
- Anthology, 2015 (compiling previously released material)
- Anthology 2: Groups & Collaborations, 2017 (plays on 11 previously unreleased tracks)
- Homebrew 7, 2021

=== Production ===
- Kitsuné Maison Compilation 15, 2013

=== Remixes ===
- Marc Hype & Jim Dunloop: "Al Naafiysh: The Remixes", 2010 (single)
- Syd Arthur: A Monstrous Psychedelic Bubble, 2014

=== Sessions ===
- Pet Shop Boys: Fundamental, 2006
- Mareva Galenter: Happy Fiu, 2008
- Demis Roussos: Demis, 2009
