= An Evening of Yes Music and More =

2016–17 concert tour by Yes Featuring Jon Anderson, Trevor Rabin, Rick Wakeman

- World tour by Yes Featuring Jon Anderson, Trevor Rabin, Rick Wakeman
- Logo for the tour
- Location: North America, Europe, Asia
- Start date: 4 October 2016
- End date: 14 October 2017
- Legs: 5
- No. of shows: 91 total

Yes Featuring Jon Anderson, Trevor Rabin, Rick Wakeman concert chronology
- An Evening of Yes Music and More (2016–2017); Quintessential Yes: The 50th Anniversary Tour (2018)

An Evening of Yes Music and More was a worldwide concert tour by the rock band Yes Featuring Jon Anderson, Trevor Rabin, Rick Wakeman, formed by lead vocalist Jon Anderson, guitarist Trevor Rabin and keyboardist Rick Wakeman, all former members of the English rock band Yes. Launched ten months after the group officially announced their formation, the tour visited theatres, halls, and arenas across North America, Europe and Asia.

The name of the tour is a reference to An Evening of Yes Music Plus, a 1989-90 concert tour by ABWH, an older band which also consisted of former Yes members, and of which Anderson and Wakeman were members.

The tour is documented on a live album and DVD.

== Overview ==
The tour began on 4 October 2016 under the name Anderson, Rabin and Wakeman and ran until the end of summer 2017. The band started using the new name of Yes Featuring Jon Anderson, Trevor Rabin and Rick Wakeman on the early 2017 tour leg, and then launched the new name in April to promote the North American summer tour.

Additional touring musicians were bassist Lee Pomeroy and drummer Lou Molino III. The tour marked the first time the three former Yes members performed together since Yes' Union Tour of 1991–1992. The tour saw two songs dropped from the set after only one show: "Leaves of Green" and "Starship Trooper". Other songs were steadily added to the set as Rabin's confidence in his voice improved; the song "Lift Me Up" was added for the second show on 7 October 2016, and a fan favourite, "Changes", was added to the show on 22 October 2016.

== Personnel ==
Yes featuring Jon Anderson, Trevor Rabin and Rick Wakeman

- Jon Anderson – lead and backing vocals, acoustic rhythm guitar, Celtic harp, percussion
- Trevor Rabin – lead guitars (acoustic and electric), timpani on "Awaken," backing and lead vocals
- Rick Wakeman – keyboards, synthesisers

Additional musicians

- Lee Pomeroy – bass, backing vocals (except Japan)
- Lou Molino III – drums, percussion, backing vocals
- Iain Hornal – bass, backing vocals (Japan only)

Special guests

- Ryan Rabin - drums on "Owner of a Lonely Heart" (22 November 2016)

== Setlists ==
=== Pre-tour speculation ===
In an interview with Rolling Stone magazine, Anderson stated that the band would perform classic Yes songs like "Awaken" and "And You and I" as well as some songs from Talk (1994), 90125 (1983) and Big Generator (1987). Anderson also hinted at the songs "Perpetual Change" and "Starship Trooper" to be played. He also assured that the setlist shouldn't fluctuate from night to night, stating: "It's like a movie to me, a play. Once you've got [the setlist] right, you stick to it since it'll only get better. If you start changing it you finish up a little bit confused."

In a separate interview with The Prog Report Rabin stated that "Shoot High, Aim Low" was due to be performed on the tour as well as "a lot from 90125".

=== Setlists ===
Setlist 1 (4 October 2016 – 22 July 2017)
The currently known setlist (all songs are by Yes unless otherwise noted):

0. Intro: Classical arrangement of the "Perpetual Change" theme
1. "Cinema"
2. "Perpetual Change"
3. "Hold On"
4. "I've Seen All Good People"
5. Drum solo / "Lift Me Up"
  (added on 7 October 2016; not played on 27 November 2016 due to Rabin being too unwell to sing.)
6. "And You and I"
7. "Rhythm of Love"
8. "Heart of the Sunrise"
  (originally played between "The Meeting" and "Awaken"; moved to this position from 22 October 2016 onwards)
9. "Changes"
  (added on 22 October 2016; not played on 27 November 2016 due to Rabin being too unwell to sing.)
10. "Long Distance Runaround"
11. "The Fish (Schindleria Praematurus)" (tribute to Chris Squire)
  (From 30 November 2016 this was extended to include excerpts from "On the Silent Wings of Freedom" and "The Revealing Science of God".)
12. "The Meeting" (ABWH song)
  (Dropped from 27 November 2016 – 25 March 2017.)
13. "Awaken"
  (originally played before "Long Distance Runaround"; moved to this position from 7 October 2016 onwards.)
14. "Make It Easy" / "Owner of a Lonely Heart"

Encore:

1. "Roundabout"
  (originally played after "The Fish"; moved to this position from 7 October 2016 onwards, replacing "Starship Trooper" as the encore.)

Other songs

- "Leaves of Green" (excerpt from "The Ancient")
  (originally played after "Rhythm of Love")
  (only played at the first show on 4 October 2016 i.e. dropped from 7 October 2016 onwards)
- "Starship Trooper"
  (originally played as the unique encore)
  (only played at the first show on 4 October 2016 i.e. dropped from 7 October 2016 onwards)
- "Hatikvah"
  (National anthem of Israel. Performed by Rabin on guitar on 7 March 2017. Played between "Heart of the Sunrise" and "Changes")

Setlist 2 (26 August 2017 onwards)
On 26 August 2017 the band changed their set list. The new set list was as follows:

1. "Cinema"
2. "Perpetual Change"
3. "Hold On"
4. "South Side of the Sky"
5. "Lift Me Up"
  (Until 9 September 2017)
6. "And You and I"
7. "Changes"
  (From 9 September 2017 onwards)
8. "Rhythm of Love"
9. "I am Waiting"
10. "Heart of the Sunrise"
11. "Awaken"
12. "Make It Easy" / "Owner of a Lonely Heart"

Encore:

1. "Roundabout"

== Tour dates ==
On 5 October 2016, the band announced, via their official Facebook page, that the original shows scheduled for 6 October and 12 October were to be cancelled. The show on 6 October at the Seminole Hard Rock Hotel & Casino was cancelled due to a hurricane warning and has been rescheduled for the same venue on 12 October. The original 12 October show at the Heinz Hall in Pittsburg has been cancelled due to an orchestra strike in the city and has been rescheduled for 30 October 2016 at the Byham Theatre. On 12 October 2016, ARW announced a second London show.

On 19 October 2016 Wakeman announced, via his personal blog, that an Israel show has been booked for 7 March 2017 and Japan dates for April 2017 before returning to North America in the summer of 2017.

List of concerts, showing date, city, country and venue.
Date	City	Country	Venue
North America
4 October 2016	Orlando	United States	Hard Rock Live
~~6 October 2016~~	~~Hollywood~~	United States	~~Seminole Hard Rock Casino~~ – Postponed due to Hurricane Matthew then rescheduled for 12 October 2016
7 October 2016	Clearwater	United States	Ruth Eckerd Hall
9 October 2016	Durham	United States	Durham Performing Arts Center
10 October 2016	Atlanta	United States	Fox Theatre
12 October 2016	Hollywood	United States	Seminole Hard Rock Casino – rescheduled show
~~12 October 2016~~	~~Pittsburgh~~	United States	~~Heinz Hall~~ – Postponed due to an orchestra strike then rescheduled (at Byham Theatre) for 30 October 2016
14 October 2016	Bethlehem	United States	Sands Bethlehem Event Center
15 October 2016	Glenside	United States	Keswick Theatre
16 October 2016	Glenside	United States	Keswick Theatre
19 October 2016	Boston	United States	Wang Theatre
21 October 2016	Wallingford	United States	Oakdale Theatre
22 October 2016	Huntington	United States	The Paramount
24 October 2016	Montclair	United States	Wellmont Theatre
26 October 2016	Red Bank	United States	Count Basie Theatre
28 October 2016	Atlantic City	United States	Borgata Event Center
29 October 2016	Akron	United States	Goodyear Theater at East End
30 October 2016	Pittsburgh	United States	Byham Theatre – rescheduled show
1 November 2016	New York City	United States	Beacon Theatre
2 November 2016	Buffalo	United States	UB Center for the Arts
4 November 2016	New Buffalo	United States	Four Winds Casino
5 November 2016	Chicago	United States	Chicago Theatre
7 November 2016	Nashville	United States	Schermerhorn Symphony Center
9 November 2016	St. Louis	United States	Fox Theatre
11 November 2016	New Orleans	United States	Saenger Theatre
12 November 2016	San Antonio	United States	Majestic Theatre
14 November 2016	Austin	United States	ACL at the Moody Theater
16 November 2016	Denver	United States	Paramount Theatre
17 November 2016	Salt Lake City	United States	Capitol Theater
19 November 2016	Las Vegas	United States	The Pearl Theater at Palms Casino Resort
20 November 2016	Phoenix	United States	Celebrity Theatre
22 November 2016	Los Angeles	United States	Orpheum Theatre
~~25 November 2016~~	~~San Francisco~~	United States	~~Masonic Auditorium~~ Rescheduled due to Rabin illness
27 November 2016	San Jose	United States	City National Civic Auditorium
29 November 2016	Portland	United States	Arlene Schnitzer Concert Hall
30 November 2016	Seattle	United States	Moore Theatre
2 December 2016	Anaheim	United States	City National Grove of Anaheim
3 December 2016	Indio	United States	Fantasy Springs Resort Casino
4 December 2016	San Francisco	United States	Masonic Auditorium - rescheduled show
Eurasia
7 March 2017	Tel Aviv	Israel	Menora Mivtachim Arena
12 March 2017	Cardiff	Wales	Motorpoint Arena Cardiff
13 March 2017	Birmingham	England	Symphony Hall
15 March 2017	Brighton	England	Brighton Dome
16 March 2017	Bournemouth	England	Bournemouth International Centre
18 March 2017	London	England	Eventim Apollo
19 March 2017	London	England	Eventim Apollo
21 March 2017	Nottingham	England	Nottingham Royal Concert Hall
22 March 2017	Edinburgh	Scotland	Usher Hall
24 March 2017	Glasgow	Scotland	Glasgow Royal Concert Hall
25 March 2017	Manchester	England	O2 Apollo Manchester
27 March 2017	Brussels	Belgium	Koninklijk Circus
28 March 2017	Utrecht	Netherlands	Tivolivredenburg
Japan
17 April 2017	Tokyo	Japan	Tokyo Orchard Hall
18 April 2017	Tokyo	Japan	Tokyo Orchard Hall
19 April 2017	Tokyo	Japan	Tokyo Orchard Hall
21 April 2017	Osaka	Japan	Osaka Archaic Hall
22 April 2017	Hiroshima	Japan	Hiroshima Club Quattro
24 April 2017	Nagoya	Japan	Shimin Kaikan Chu Hall
Europe
13 July 2017	Charlotta	Poland	Open Theatre
15 July 2017	Sankt Goarshausen	Germany	Night of the Prog Festival at Freilichtbühne Loreley
17 July 2017	Rome	Italy	Cavea dell'Auditorium Parco della Musica
19 July 2017	Schio	Italy	Arena Campagnola
20 July 2017	Saint-Julien-en-Genevois	France	Stade des Burgondes
22 July 2017	Àrbatax	Italy	Piazzale degli Scogli Rossi
North America
26 August 2017	Stockton	United States	Bob Hope Theatre
28 August 2017	Saratoga	United States	Mountain Winery
29 August 2017	Friant	United States	Table Mountain Casino
31 August 2017	Las Vegas	United States	Smith Center
2 September 2017	Layton	United States	The Kenley Amphitheater
3 September 2017	Littleton	United States	Hudson Gardens
5 September 2017	Kansas City	United States	Kauffman Center
~~7 September 2017~~	~~Milwaukee~~	United States	~~Riverside Theater~~ (cancelled show – rescheduled on 9 September 2017)
8 September 2017	Welch	United States	Treasure Island Resort & Casino
~~9 September 2017~~	~~Hammond~~	United States	~~The Venue at Horseshoe Casino~~ (cancelled show)
9 September 2017	Milwaukee	United States	Riverside Theater (rescheduled show)
12 September 2017	Kettering	United States	Fraze Pavilion
13 September 2017	Vienna	United States	Wolf Trap
15 September 2017	Akron	United States	Goodyear Theater at East End
16 September 2017	Toronto	Canada	Massey Hall
18 September 2017	Quebec City	Canada	Grand Theatre du Quebec City
19 September 2017	Montreal	Canada	Théâtre St-Denis
21 September 2017	Port Chester	United States	Capitol Theatre
23 September 2017	Wallingford	United States	Toyota Oakdale Theatre
24 September 2017	Brookville	United States	Tilles Center
27 September 2017	Newark	United States	New Jersey Performing Arts Center
29 September 2017	Reading	United States	Santander Performing Arts Center
30 September 2017	Trenton	United States	Patriots Theater at the War Memorial
1 October 2017	Philadelphia	United States	Verizon Hall at the Kimmel Center
4 October 2017	Boston	United States	Orpheum Theater
5 October 2017	Albany	United States	Palace Theatre
7 October 2017	Niagara Falls	United States	Seneca Niagara Resort & Casino
8 October 2017	Red Bank	United States	Count Basie Theatre
10 October 2017	Mebourne	United States	King Center for the Performing Arts
11 October 2017	Clearwater	United States	Ruth Eckerd Hall
13 October 2017	West Palm Beach	United States	Kravis Center for the Performing Arts
14 October 2017	Miami	United States	Adrienne Arsht Center for the Performing Arts
