= A Croak and a Grunt in the Night =

Studio album by Rabbitt
- Released: September 1977
- Studio: Satbel Recording Studios
- Genre: Pop rock
- Length: 47:12
- Labels: Jo'Burg (South Africa); Capricorn (internationally)
- Producers: Patrick van Blerk; Trevor Rabin

Rabbitt chronology
Boys Will Be Boys! (1975)	A Croak and a Grunt in the Night (1977)	Rock Rabbitt (1977)

A Croak and a Grunt in the Night is the second studio album by South African rock band Rabbitt, released in August 1977 by Jo'Burg Records in South Africa and Capricorn Records internationally. It was the band's last album with vocalist Trevor Rabin who left to start a solo career and later joined the English band Yes. The album features a guest appearance by Margaret Singana on "Tribal Fence". The album includes the song "Dingleys Bookshop", which the band recorded as the theme song to The Dingleys, a popular television show at the time.

== Background ==
Rabbitt rose to fame after their debut album Boys Will Be Boys! was released with the single "Charlie" being released in 1976 and charting on the Springbok Radio Charts. The album was certified gold and won a SARIE Award for Best Contemporary Pop Music and Rabin won for Best Arranger.

== Writing and recording ==
As with their debut, Rabin wrote and sung most of the songs on A Croak and a Grunt in the Night with writing contributions by producer Patrick van Blerk on the title track and "Lonely Loner Two" (the latter of which was co-written by Ronnie Robot). Duncan sung on several tracks such as "Searching", "Dingleys Bookshop", and "Tribal Fence" along with guest vocalist Margaret Singana. "Tribal Fence" was a cover and originally written by Freedom's Children songwriter Ramsay MacKay. It is a protest song against the government policies of Apartheid.

"Dingleys Bookshop" was written by Rabin as the theme song for the television show The Dingleys, which Duncan's brother William Faure directed and who later went on to direct the 1980s television series Shaka Zulu.

The songs were published by two separate publishers. Silversongs (who published all the songs on Boys Will be Boys!) published "Dingleys Bookshop", "Tribal Fence", "Lonely Loner Two", and "A Love You Song", with the rest of the album's songs being published by Gwongsongs.

== Cover art ==
The cover was designed by Charles Coetzee with the photographs of the band members taken by Richard Cutler. The cover has the band members surrounded by illustrative artworks showing the band's glam rock style. Rabin appears on the front, while Cloud and Faure appear on the gatefold and Robot on the back. Each member is semi-nude only being hidden by objects such as Rabin's guitar and a newspaper.

== Release and reception ==
The album was released in 1977 and was certified Gold. The album's release was a major event in the media. Despite its success, the band disbanded shortly afterwards with the widely announced tour of the US and UK never materializing. Rabin eventually left the band to pursue a solo career, and the three remaining members recorded and released the less successful Rock Rabbitt. The band disbanded entirely not long after its release.

== Covers ==
After the band disbanded, Duncan Faure joined the Bay City Rollers (then renamed The Rollers) and re-recorded "Working for the People" on their 1980 album Voxx. Rabin covered "Hold On to Love" (re-titled "Hold On to Me") for his 1989 solo album Can't Look Away, which featured Faure on backing vocals.

Margaret Singana included her own version of "Tribal Fence" as the title track to her sixth album, in which the entire band appeared, with Rabin and Julian Laxton producing.

== Track listing ==
All tracks are written by and sung by Trevor Rabin except where noted. All songs published by Gwongsongs except where noted.

Side one
No.	Title	Writer(s)	Notes	Length
1.	"T.C. Rabin in D-Minor"			0:24
2.	"I Sleep Alone"			2:52
3.	"A Croak and a Grunt in the Night"	Van Blerk; Rabin		2:37
4.	"Everybody's Cheating"			4:10
5.	"Sugar Pie"		Vocals by Trevor and Duncan	3:22
6.	"Searching"		Vocals by Trevor and Duncan	4:13
7.	"Working for the People"		Vocals by Trevor and Duncan	4:21
8.	"Pollyman"			2:32
Total length:				24:22

Side two
No.	Title	Writer(s)	Notes	Length
1.	"Schumann"			0:21
2.	"Hold On to Love"			4:06
3.	"Dingleys Bookshop"		Vocals by Trevor and Duncan, published by Silversongs	2:37
4.	"Never Gonna Ruin My Life"			0:56
5.	"Tribal Fence"	Ramsey McKay	Vocals by Trevor and Margaret Singana, published by Silversongs	3:51
6.	"Gift of Love"			3:44
7.	"Lonely Loner Two"	Van Blerk; Rabin; Robot	Vocals by Duncan and Trevor, published by Silversongs	3:35
8.	"Take It Easy"			3:40
9.	"A Love You Song"	Faure	Vocals by Duncan, published by Silversongs	1:45
Total length:				24:35 48:57

== Personnel ==
=== Rabbitt ===
- Trevor Rabin – vocals, guitars, piano, electric piano, harmonica, tubular bells and string arrangements
- Neil Cloud – drums and percussion
- Ronnie Robot – bass
- Duncan Faure – vocals, rhythm guitar, organ and piano

=== Special guest ===
- Margaret Singana – vocals on "Tribal Fence"

=== Production ===
- Trevor Rabin – production and arrangement
- Patrick van Blerk – production
- Peter Thwaites – engineering and remixing
- Greg Cutler – engineering and remixing
- Julian Laxton – associate producer and remixing

== Certification ==
Certification for A Croak and a Grunt in the Night
Region	Certification	Certified Units/Sales
South Africa (South African Recording Industry)	Gold	25,000
