= Rio (Trevor Rabin album) =

2023 studio album by Trevor Rabin

Studio album by Trevor Rabin
- Released: 6 October 2023
- Genre: Progressive rock; art rock; hard rock; bluegrass
- Length: 55:00
- Label: Inside Out Music
- Producer: Trevor Rabin

Trevor Rabin chronology
Changes (2020)	Rio (2023)

Singles from Rio
- 1. "Big Mistakes" Released: 4 August 2023; 2. "Push" Released: 5 September 2023; 3. "Oklahoma" Released: 29 September 2023

Rio is the sixth studio album by South African musician, songwriter, and producer Trevor Rabin, released on 6 October 2023 on Inside Out Music. It is his first solo album of new material since 2012's Jacaranda (2012), and his first with vocals since 1989's Can't Look Away. The album is named for Rabin's granddaughter. Rabin also painted the album's cover.

== Background ==
Trevor Rabin recorded Rio over the span of many years. In 2017, Rabin said he was roughly halfway through recording. At this point, Rabin was touring with his former Yes bandmates Jon Anderson and Rick Wakeman in a spinoff band named Yes Featuring Jon Anderson, Trevor Rabin, Rick Wakeman. In 2020, Yes Featuring Jon Anderson, Trevor Rabin, Rick Wakeman officially disbanded and Rabin said he was working hard on a new solo album. Recording of Rio was complete in 2022.

== Release ==
Leading up to the release of Rio, three singles from the album were released from Rio. "Big Mistakes" was released as a digital single on 4 August, followed by “Push” on 5 September, and “Oklahoma” on 29 September. The album was released on 6 October 2023 by Inside Out Music and Sony.

== Track listing ==
All tracks are written by and arranged by Trevor Rabin except where noted.

Rio track listing
No.	Title	Writer(s)	Length
1.	"Big Mistakes"	Rabin, Dante Marchi	5:32
2.	"Push"		6:48
3.	"Oklahoma"		6:52
4.	"Paradise"		7:03
5.	"Thandi"		4:22
6.	"Goodbye"		5:10
7.	"Tumbleweed"		4:08
8.	"These Tears"		5:18
9.	"Egoli"		4:03
10.	"Toxic"		5:44
Total length:			55:00

== Personnel ==
- Trevor Rabin – lead vocals, guitars, bass, keyboards, banjo, dobro, mandolin
- Charlie Bisharat – violin on "Push"
- Vinnie Colaiuta – drums on "Push"
- Liz Constantine – backing vocals on "Big Mistakes" and "Paradise"
- Lou Molino III – drums, percussion, backing vocals on "Paradise"
- Dante Marchi – backing vocals on "Big Mistakes" and "Paradise"

== Charts ==
Chart (2023)	Peak position
German Albums (Offizielle Top 100)	90
Scottish Albums (OCC)	18
Swiss Albums (Schweizer Hitparade)	52
UK Rock & Metal Albums (OCC)	5
US Top Album Sales (Billboard)	73
