= Jacaranda (Trevor Rabin album) =

Studio album by Trevor Rabin
- Released: 8 May 2012
- Recorded: 2007–2012
- Studio: The Jacaranda Room (Hollywood, California, U.S.)
- Genre: Jazz; rock; bluegrass; instrumental
- Length: 43:32
- Label: Varèse Sarabande
- Producer: Trevor Rabin

Trevor Rabin chronology
90124 (2003)	Jacaranda (2012)	Changes (2020)

Jacaranda is the fifth studio album by South African musician, songwriter, and producer Trevor Rabin, released on 8 May 2012 on Varèse Sarabande. His first solo album of new material since Can't Look Away (1989), Rabin started work on the album in 2007 by writing music in various styles that was challenging for him to play, including jazz fusion, rock, blues, classical, and bluegrass. Most of the album's song titles refer to Rabin's experiences while growing up in South Africa. Recording took place over a six-year period at his studio in Los Angeles. Five guest musicians perform on the album, including drummers Lou Molino III, Vinnie Colaiuta, Rabin's son Ryan, bassist Tal Wilkenfeld, and singer Liz Constantine.

After the release of Jacaranda was pushed back several times, the album had a limited release which entered the U.S. Billboard Contemporary Jazz Albums charts at number 6 and number 19 under Jazz Albums. Several reviewers rated the album highly, giving praise to Rabin's musical abilities and the variety of genres he covers. Rabin cites Jacaranda as the best album of his career, and announced that a follow-up album with lead vocals was in progress.

== Background ==
Jacaranda was Rabin's first studio album of all new material since Can't Look Away (1989), a gap of 23 years. Since his departure from the rock band Yes in 1995, Rabin had worked as a film composer in Los Angeles, California. The idea of producing a solo album came about in 2007 when Rabin began, without any direction or influence from a record company or concerned about demographics or genre, to write music that interested him and challenging to play, feeling "totally free" to develop material with an emphasis on performance and not be concerned whether others would like it or not. The orchestral and tightly structured nature of film scoring prevented Rabin to "really stretch out and really play" in his compositions, and found he had not played anything he considered challenging or technical on the guitar for a considerable amount of time. He opted to make an instrumental album as one with lead vocals and lyrics did not interest him, and pointed out the benefit of changing track titles easily should he wish to change them. As Rabin was out of practice, the quick and technical guitar passages on the album led to him suffering from blisters on his hands when recording. He practised the piano and guitar in half-hour sections while working on film scores until he was able to perform the material he had written for the album.

== Recording ==
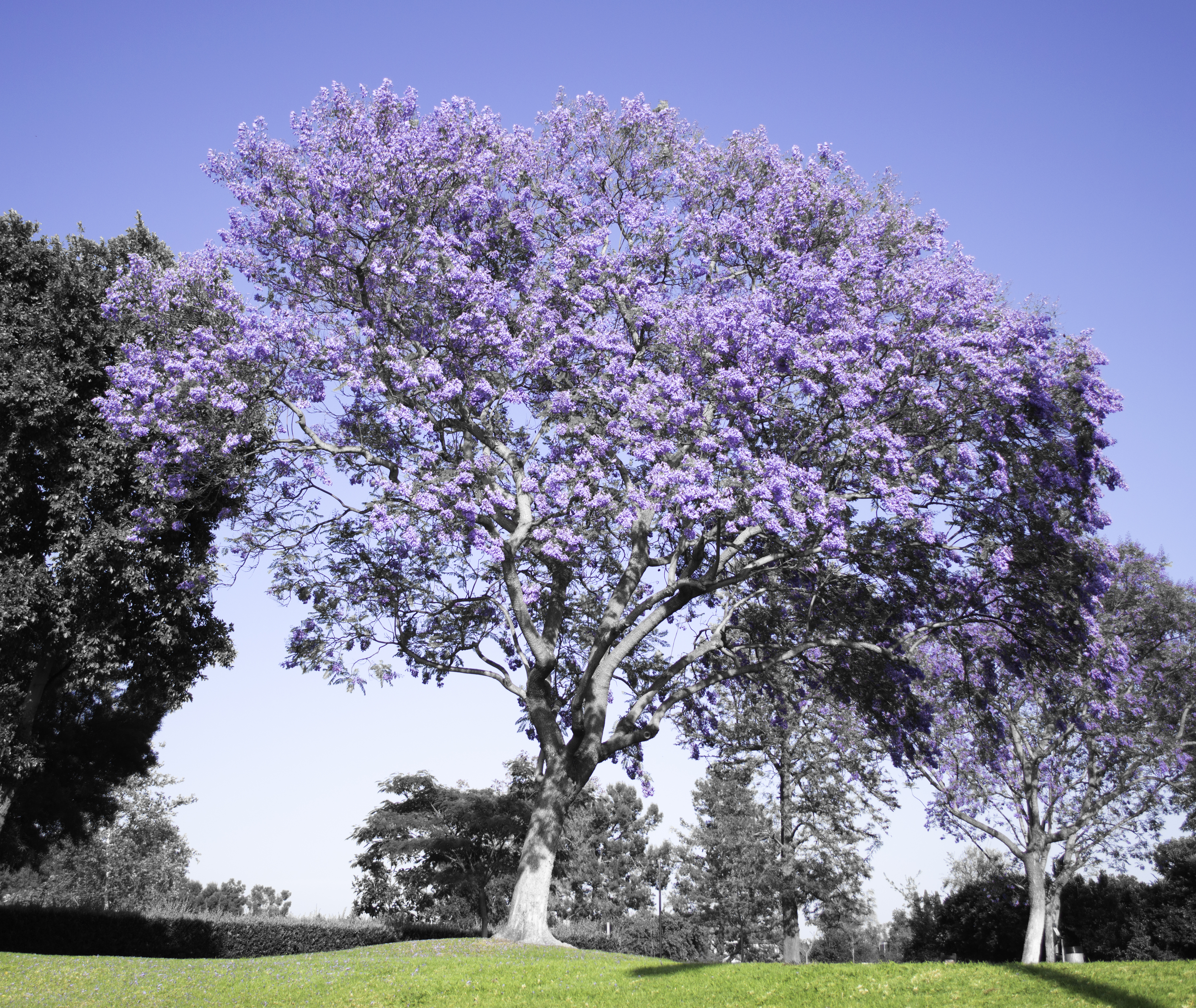
Rabin named the album, and his home recording studio, after the Jacaranda tree found in his native South Africa.

Jacaranda was recorded over a five to six-year period at The Jacaranda Room, the name of Rabin's home recording studio in Hollywood, California which he named, in addition to the album's title, after the Jacaranda tree found in his native South Africa. It was recorded digitally throughout using the audio workstation software Digital Performer with electronic instrumentation used as little as possible to emphasise the playing of genuine instruments. Rabin wanted to make the album "a journey back to where I grew up"; most of the album's tracks reference something from his experiences while living in Johannesburg during the first 20 years of his life, a period when he underwent an introspective phase and came up with the album's song titles. "Anerley Road" refers to the road where he grew up, "and each side of the road is lined with Jacaranda trees ... the road becomes like this purple carpet and it is pretty spectacular". "The Branch Office" refers to a jazz music venue in the city. Recording an album with such memories made Rabin feel "a little" homesick. The album took a considerable amount of time to complete as Rabin worked on it during breaks from film scoring and family holidays. In 2011, he felt he needed to become more disciplined to finish the album and rejected several scoring projects that year to allow more free time.

The album's liner notes lists 16 acoustic and electric guitars that Rabin plays on Jacaranda, as well as other instruments including bass guitar, a Young Chang grand piano, Hammond organ, and autoharp. He used a Marshall 100, Ampeg VT-120, and Fernandez guitar amplifiers and a Korg A3 as his effects unit with pieces of it built by Bob Bradshaw. His rack included a MXR compressor, a Roland fuzz box, an MXR delay 1500, a TC6000 reverb unit, various software based compressors and delays, and a Neumann microphone to record his dobro. "Killarney 1 & 2" was recorded with two Neumann 87 model microphones. He saw the album as an opportunity to use instruments that he liked the most, "forget[ing] the orchestra that I have been just swimming in for forty films, pick them up and play". Among them was his dobro that he had used for colouring and textural purposes in his film scores, and features him using a chrome metal slide to play the instrument as if it was a slide guitar.

Five musicians performed additional instruments, including drummers Lou Molino III ("Anerley Road", "Freethought", and "Zoo Lake"), Vinnie Colaiuta ("Market Street" and "Through the Tunnel"), and Rabins' son Ryan ("The Branch Office" and "Me and My Boy"), who impressed Rabin when it came to recording the latter as it features an odd time signature of 7/8, making Rabin think he would have to sit him down to explain what he wanted, but Ryan sat down and played it "perfectly". Rabin had recorded a digital drum track as a demo for what he wanted. Though Rabin did not plan on how the drums turned out on the final record, he was satisfied with the result and spent time thinking about which drummer would be the most suitable for each track. Rabin had never met Colaiuta before, but the drummer was happy to play for him and enjoyed playing on "Market Street" so much, he asked Rabin if there were other tracks he could feature on. At that point, Rabin was still sketching out what "Through the Tunnel" was going to be but later recalled: "Before I had got through explaining it to him he sat down and played exactly what it was. It was phenomenal".

Jacaranda featured Rabin using elements from a variety of genres, including jazz, rock, blues, classical and baroque music, and bluegrass (the last of which he had been a fan of from a while and had integrated its sound into many of his film scores, but not into any previous solo music). This was not a particularly conscious approach, since Rabin had simply decided to proceed in each case with material that worked, but the mixture made the album exciting for him. On each track, Rabin wanted to "explore something new", and . For much of the album he adopted a writing style he called "orchestrally, but with guitars". Following the album's release, Rabin became unsure as to what genre the album fits under; following its release he called it "an instrumental album with a whole load of different things". Despite the variety of music explored within Jacaranda and the consequent difficulty in marketing it, Rabin considered the album to be the most focused of his career, and considered the music he expressed on it a turning point in his career, deciding to become as creatively free on his future solo projects.

== Songs ==
Jacaranda opens with "Spider Boogie", a short track that Rabin recorded while he was testing out a new amplifier. He proceeded to "mess around" on his Westone guitar which led to an improvised riff that he decided to cut into a track for the album.

"Market Street", the first of two tracks with Colaiuta on the drums, had not been fully written or arranged when it came to recording the drum tracks. Rabin asked him to perform six to seven minutes of drums with a 20/8 time signature with varied fills which Colaiuta did in one take, leaving Rabin to develop the song further with the different rhythms that were played.

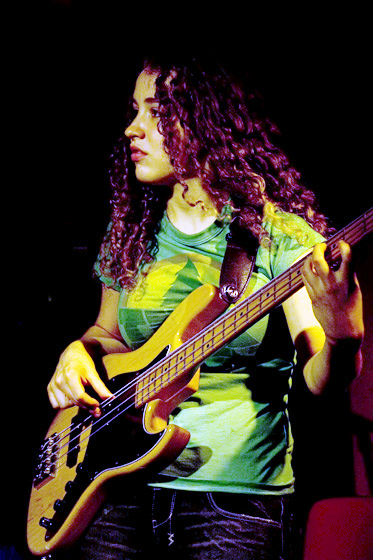
"Anerley Road" features bassist Tal Wilkenfeld.

"Anerley Road" features a Tobias bass that founder Mike Tobias had custom made for Rabin which the guitarist found easy to play fast passages on. At Colaiuta's suggestion, Rabin had Australian bassist Tal Wilkenfeld play on it and thought her style was suitable for the track. Rabin named "Anerley Road" as the track that made him realise he was out of practise on the guitar which led to daily practise sessions that lasted for at least two hours.

For "Through the Tunnel", Rabin was inspired to do a shuffle in a similar 20/8 time signature, "which means basically six triplets and then two-thirds of a triplet at the end, chopping off the last triplet". It features Rabin playing an Alembic bass.

"Rescue" is a rearrangement of a song Rabin originally wrote for his score to the 2006 film The Guardian titled "Rescuing Fischer" which features Liz Constantine singing wordless vocals. Rabin felt it would be suitable for Jacaranda, but he co-owns the rights to the original arrangement with The Walt Disney Company, leaving him the choice of re-recording it with added guitar parts.

"Killarney 1 & 2" is a suite of two piano instrumentals performed on a Young Chang concert grand piano, the second of which includes an acoustic guitar. Rabin found it difficult to play the piece after he had written it, so he revisited a book of piano exercises and practised scales for as long as two hours a day over a period of around five weeks. The track is a tribute to the influence that classical music had on Rabin in his youth, and working on film scores for a number of years provided him with a natural influence for the piece. Though "Killarney 1 & 2" was not its original title, Rabin felt it was appropriate to rename it after the Johannesburg neighbourhood of Killarney where he grew up. The idea for the piece came to him during a meal at a restaurant, to which he sketched most of the composition on a napkin.

"Me and My Boy" is the second track to feature Ryan Rabin on the drums. It opens with a heavy rock sound that Rabin achieved on an Ampeg guitar that Chris Squire's technician gave to him with a pickup that could move up and down the body. Having never used the guitar before, Rabin later called it "the biggest piece of crap". The song then developed from the opening riff.

"Gazania" concludes with a bark from Rabin's dog Rompie. Rabin provides the vocals on the second half of the track which he did for added texture.

== Release ==
Rabin did not consider options on how to the album was to be released, and with what label, until 2011, as the album neared completion. Despite being told that releasing an instrumental album would result in a decline in sales, Rabin chose to sign with Varèse Sarabande, a label that specialises in film scores and cast recordings, as he liked the staff and knew of past soundtracks released through them. He added: "Varese just seemed to get it. They really got what I was trying to do and understood what it was." The album's front cover portrait was done by Hannah Hooper, Ryan Rabin's bandmate in Grouplove. The release date of Jacaranda was pushed back several times. Billboard first reported an initial release of September 2011, before Rabin said early January 2012 then April 2012. The album was finally released on 8 May 2012. A release party was held at the Gibson Showroom in Beverly Hills, California the following month.

The album entered the Billboard charts at No. 6 under Contemporary Jazz Albums and No. 19 under Jazz Albums.

On 1 August 2012, a music video for "Anerley Road" was released on YouTube. Rabin had made initial consultations to make one with a video producer, but soon wished to oversee the project himself. He filmed, edited, and produced the video which features himself and Molino miming to the song.

== Reception ==
The Seattle Post-Intelligencer published a positive review that considered the album an "artistic and challenging achievement" and a "richly varied and multi-dimensional musical soundscape", with Rabin's guitar work as the album's main tour de force. Ian Patterson of All About Jazz gave the album a positive review, writing "an innovative, surprising recording, which merges contrasting musical styles quite seamlessly. Rabin's nuanced writing and enveloping arrangements are as notable as his sparkling playing which, whilst technically impressive, is primarily concerned with telling a story." Shawn Perry also wrote a positive review for Vintage Rock, describing the album as "a tapestry of textures, layers, disciplines and pure virtuosity". GuitarHoo praised Rabin highly, saying the album "solidifies his place as a musical legend" that highlights his ability to "go back and forth between styles, while making it all his own, in an easy to listen to way. "Anerley Road" was picked as a highlight of the record, "interweaving intricate melodies with piano and syncopated beats". Classic Rock Revisited wrote that with Jacaranda, Rabin "amazes listeners with his technique, versatility, virtuosity, and physical dexterity" with guitar picking styles comparable to Chet Atkins. Grant Moon gave the album three-and-a-half stars out of five in an article for Louder. He concluded: "Jacaranda leaves you feeling that the artist has really given of himself, and that perhaps you now know him a bit better – and how rare is that?"

Speaking on the album, Rabin expected to receive criticism from it as it lacked a strong focus to a particular demographic, but felt it was a good thing as he likes and performs a variety of music styles. He also expressed a concern that much of his fan base were still attached to his past role as rock guitarist and singer, thus making Jacaranda a more unpopular album, though felt helpful they would follow him on his "creative journey". He went on to describe the project overall as "almost like a guilty pleasure" as there was no need to make a new album for money but for the love of doing it.

Following its release, Rabin named Jacaranda as the best album of his career, and began work on a follow up featuring lead vocals. Jon Anderson had listened to the album upon release and sent parts of it with his vocals added to the music. Rabin was surprised but flattered, and noted Anderson's interest in taking sections from Jacaranda and adapting it for the first album by Yes Featuring Jon Anderson, Trevor Rabin, Rick Wakeman.

== Track listing ==
All tracks written and arranged by Trevor Rabin.

Jacaranda track listing
No.	Title	Length
1.	"Spider Boogie"	0:52
2.	"Market Street"	5:35
3.	"Anerley Road"	7:14
4.	"Through the Tunnel"	5:55
5.	"The Branch Office"	2:06
6.	"Rescue"	3:57
7.	"Killarney 1 & 2"	3:55
8.	"Storks Bill Geranium Waltz"	1:02
9.	"Me and My Boy"	3:14
10.	"Freethought"	2:15
11.	"Zoo Lake"	4:09
12.	"Gazania"	3:12

== Personnel ==
Credits are adapted from the album's liner notes.

- Trevor Rabin
  - acoustic and electric guitars (dobro, Westone Rainbow guitar, Gibson Super 400 CES, Moon acoustic guitar, gut string guitar, Alvarez signature guitar, Gibson Les Paul, Fender Stratocaster, Gretsch guitar, Barney Kessel guitar, Ludwig banjo, Alvarez acoustic guitar)
  - bass guitars (Alembic bass, upright bass, Tobias guitar, Westone fretless bass, Bugbass upright bass)
  - keyboards (Young Chang grand piano, Hammond B-3 organ)
  - autoharp
  - "a little vocal"

Additional musicians

- Vinnie Colaiuta – drums on "Market Street" and "Through the Tunnel"
- Lou Molino III – drums on "Anerley Road", "Freethought", and "Zoo Lake"
- Ryan Rabin – drums on "The Branch Office" and "Me and My Boy"
- Tal Wilkenfeld – electric bass guitar on "Anerley Road"
- Liz Constantine – vocals on "Rescue"

Production

- Trevor Rabin – production, engineering
- Paul Linford – mastering
- Ron DeVivo – back cover photo
- Bill Pitzonka – art direction and design
- Hannah Hooper – cover portrait

== Charts ==
Chart (2012)	Peak position
US Top Contemporary Jazz Albums (Billboard)	6
US Top Jazz Albums (Billboard)	19
