= Quintessential Yes: The 50th Anniversary Tour =

2018 concert tour by Yes Featuring Jon Anderson, Trevor Rabin, Rick Wakeman

- World tour by Yes Featuring Jon Anderson, Trevor Rabin, Rick Wakeman
- Location: Europe, North America
- Start date: 3 June 2018
- End date: 9 September 2018
- Legs: 2
- No. of shows: 18

Yes Featuring Jon Anderson, Trevor Rabin, Rick Wakeman concert chronology
- An Evening of Yes Music and More (2016–2017); Quintessential Yes: The 50th Anniversary Tour (2018)

Quintessential Yes: The 50th Anniversary Tour was a Spring/Summer 2018 concert tour by the rock band Yes Featuring Jon Anderson, Trevor Rabin, Rick Wakeman and their second and final tour. It followed their 2016-17 An Evening of Yes Music and More tour. During the tour, the band performed at the Stone Free Festival at The O_{2} Arena in London.

The tour overlapped with a simultaneous 50th anniversary tour by Howe and White's ongoing line-up of Yes. This was the final time, to date, that Anderson, Rabin or Wakeman toured under the "Yes" name, though Anderson continues to tour under his own name, heavily promoting the inclusion of Yes material.

== Personnel ==
Yes featuring Jon Anderson, Trevor Rabin and Rick Wakeman

- Jon Anderson – lead vocals, acoustic guitar
- Trevor Rabin – lead guitar, backing and lead vocals
- Rick Wakeman – keyboards

Additional musicians

- Iain Hornal – bass, backing vocals (European dates)
- Lee Pomeroy – bass, backing vocals (US Dates)
- Lou Molino III – drums, percussion, backing vocals

== Set list ==
1. "Cinema"
2. "Hold On"
3. "South Side of the Sky" (dropped after 17 June 2018)
4. "And You and I"
5. "Changes"
6. "Perpetual Change"
7. "I've Seen All Good People"
8. "Rhythm of Love"
9. "Lift Me Up" (added starting 26 August 2018)
10. "I Am Waiting"
11. "Heart of the Sunrise"
12. "Awaken"
13. "Owner of a Lonely Heart"
14. "Roundabout"

== Tour dates ==
The following tour dates are taken from the band's official website.

List of concerts, showing date, city, country and venue.
Date	City	Country	Venue
Europe
3 June 2018	Warsaw	Poland	Park Sowińskiego
5 June 2018	Mannheim	Germany	Zelt Festival
7 June 2018	Oslo	Norway	Sentrum Scene
9 June 2018	Norje	Sweden	Sweden Rock Festival
10 June 2018	Copenhagen	Denmark	Vega
12 June 2018	Newcastle	England	Newcastle City Hall
13 June 2018	York	England	Barbican Centre
17 June 2018	London	England	The O_{2} Arena; Stone Free Festival
North America
26 August 2018	Los Angeles	United States	Whisky a Go Go
27 August 2018	San Diego	United States	Humphrey's Concerts by the Bay
29 August 2018	Los Angeles	United States	Greek Theatre
31 August 2018	Phoenix	United States	Celebrity Theatre
1 September 2018	Las Vegas	United States	Westgate Resort & Casino
3 September 2018	Denver	United States	Levitt Pavilion
5 September 2018	Milwaukee	United States	Riverside Theater
7 September 2018	Chicago	United States	Ravinia Festival
8 September 2018	Northfield	United States	Hard Rock Live
9 September 2018	Huber Heights	United States	Rose Music Center
