= The Dingleys =

South African television family drama

- Directed by: William C. Faure
- Starring: John Hussey; Vera Blacke; Sybel Coetzee; Eckard Rabe
- Theme music composer: Rabbitt
- Opening theme: "Dingley's Bookshop"
- No. of episodes: 24

Original release
- Network: SABC TV
- Release: 4 January 1977

The Dingleys is an early South African television family drama from 1977, following the South African Broadcasting Corporation's introduction of television. Set in Pietermaritzburg in Natal (now KwaZulu-Natal), it centred on a fictional middle-class, white South African, English-speaking family, the Dingleys, who own a bookshop.

The series starred John Hussey, Vera Blacker, Sybel Coetzee and Eckard Rabe. It was directed by Bill Faure. Although some outdoor scenes were shot on location in Pietermaritzburg, most of the show was recorded on a set in the SABC's Johannesburg studios. Celia Motsie, who played the only black character in the series, was removed after she shared a table with white cast members in the SABC's whites-only canteen.

It received mixed reviews from South African viewers, with the Rand Daily Mail publishing complaints from readers under the heading "The Dingleys are dreadful", although others described it as "good clean fun", praising the sight of "a family sticking together - be it rather conservative and dull."

The theme song, "Dingley's Bookshop", was performed by Rabbitt, and featured on their album A Croak And A Grunt In The Night. One of its members, Duncan Faure, was the brother of the programme's producer.
