= Live in L.A. =

Live in L.A. may refer to:

- Live in L.A. (Death & Raw), 2001 album from American metal band Death
- Live in L.A. (Joe Cocker album), 1976 album from English blues and rock musician Joe Cocker
- Live in LA (Trevor Rabin album), 2003 album from South African musician Trevor Rabin
- Live in L.A. (The Rippingtons album), 1992 album from American contemporary jazz group The Rippingtons

== See also ==
- L.A. Live
