= Marc Liebeskind =

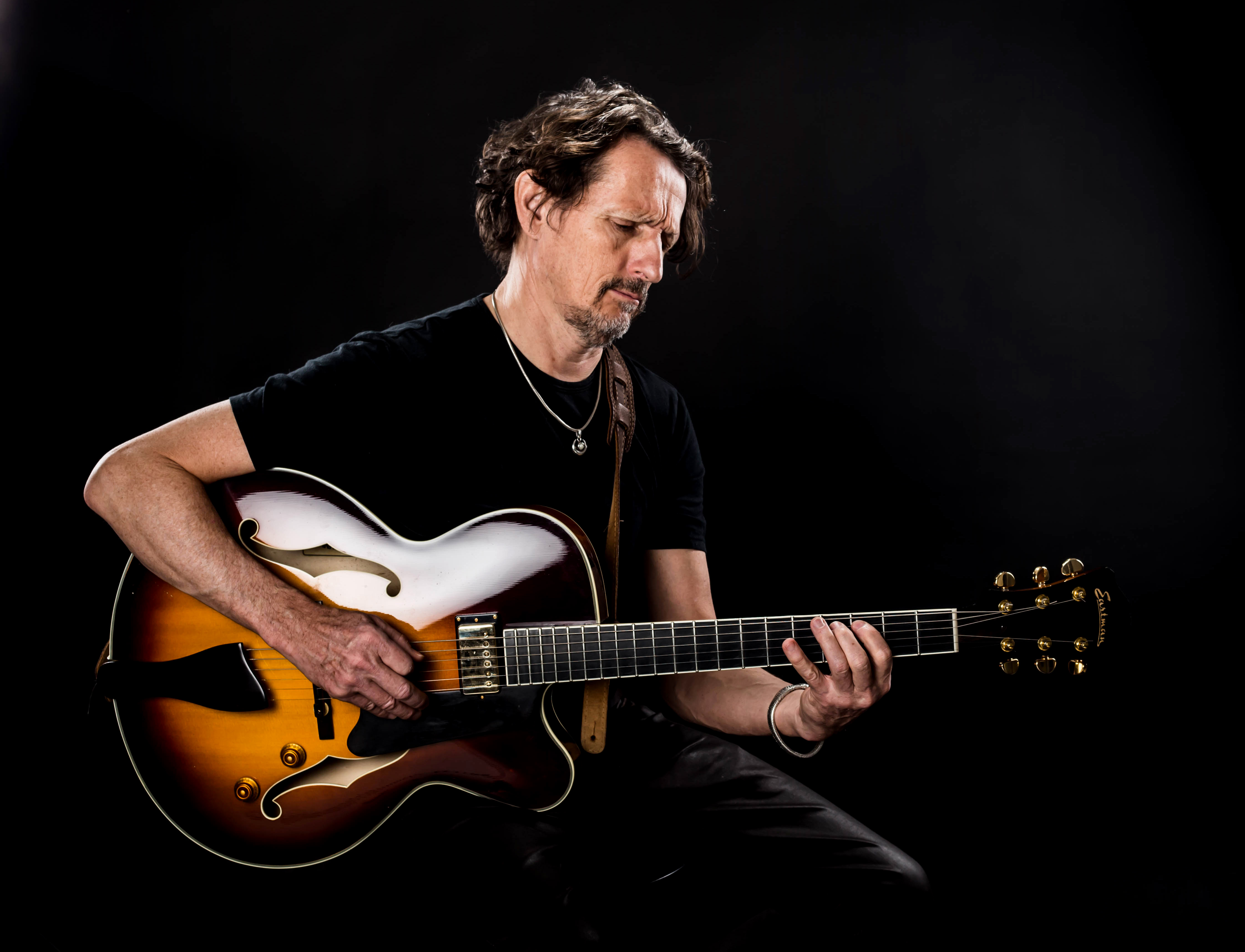

Background information
- Born: 1956 (age 69–70); Geneva, Switzerland
- Genres: Classical music Jazz; Hindustani music
- Occupations: Musician, producer, sound engineer, guitarist
- Instrument: Guitar
- Label: New Healing Sounds
- Website: marcliebeskind.com

Marc Liebeskind (born 1956 in Geneva, Switzerland) is a Swiss composer, guitarist, musician, sound engineer and producer. His musical influences vary from Jazz, Hindustani music (North Indian classical) to music of West Africa and of Brazilian music.

== Early life and education ==
Marc Liebeskind started playing the guitar at the age of 18. He then formed a rock band called "Carte Blance" that existed for about 2 years. Later, he became a jazz player.

Liebeskind attended workshops at the AMR (Association pour l'encouragement de la Musique improvisée). After completing his studies at the Conservatoire de Musique de Genève, he studied at the Swiss Jazz School in the neighbouring city of Bern.

== Career ==
In 1984 Liebeskind went to New York to meet with such influential jazz musicians like John Scofield, John Abercrombie, Bill Frisell and with Barry Harris.

=== Quartet ===
Having returned to Geneva in 1985, Marc formed his first quartet. During the years 1990–1997 he released 4 CDs, which he mostly wrote himself. He traveled to Brasil and performed there at a number of concerts.

=== Africa ===
The musician's interest in Africa and its influences began at the age of 23 when he started taking regular dance classes with Paco Yé during a period of 5 years. He was inspired by the continent's rhythms and in particular, those of the Mandingues societies. During the years 1987–1989 Liebeskind formed and developed a group with African members under the name of Djambadon. The group included a singer and political refugee Koté Carvalho as well as Erik Truffaz, Philippe Ehinger, and Serge Zaugg.

In 1997 he went on a tour around West Africa with his recently formed quartet. There he discovered new sounds – from Ouagadougou (Wassa club), Ghana, Niger to Mali and Burkina Faso. He settled in Bamako for a year where he recorded music with some local musicians.

In 2002 Liebeskind met Kora-virtuoso Ibra Galissa from Guinea-Bissau and Christophe Erard who plays double bass; they formed the group Taffetas. Marc Libeskind often traveled to West Africa to immerse himself in the music. The group signed with record label Most in London what followed were numerous tours around Europe, Africa and also in South Korea.

=== Sit-guitar ===
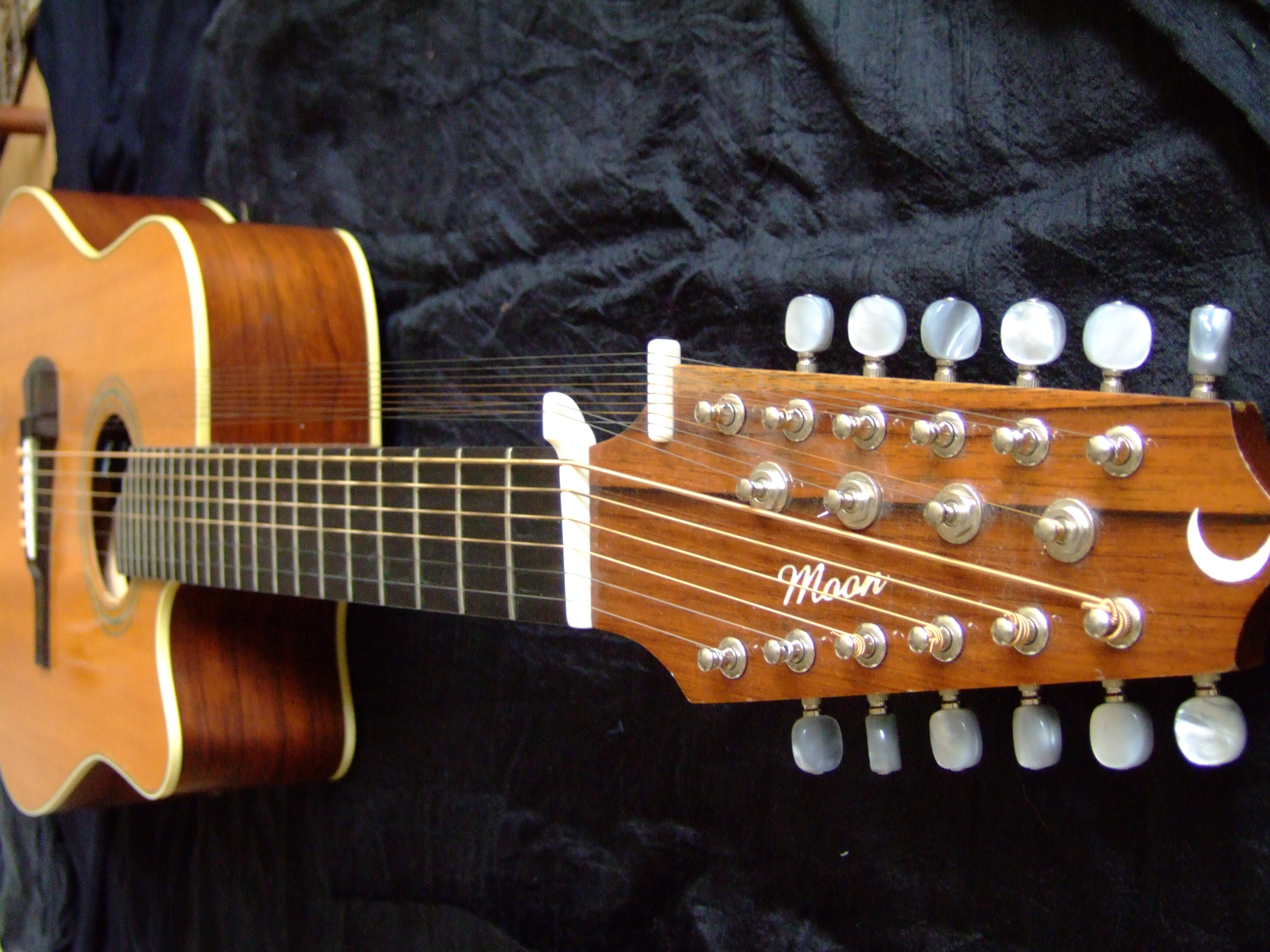
Sit-guitar

After playing Jazz for more than 25 years, Liebeskind discovered the Indian classical music in 1997. As a guitar player he began to contemplate how with his personal experience he could express this new sound.

The design of a new instrument began in 1999. After plenty of adjustments and tests, the prototype was finally created in 2004, nearly 5 years after he got the original idea. The instrument allows for the sixteen strings to vibrate properly recreating the sensations associated with Hindustani musical style.

Liebeskind contacted the professional guitar maker, Moon Guitars from Glasgow (Scotland) to whom he communicated all the details and instructions of what the new instrument should incorporate. Combining the rosewood from Mozambique and Siberian pine, ebony, in about a year the Sit-Guitar Moon was created.

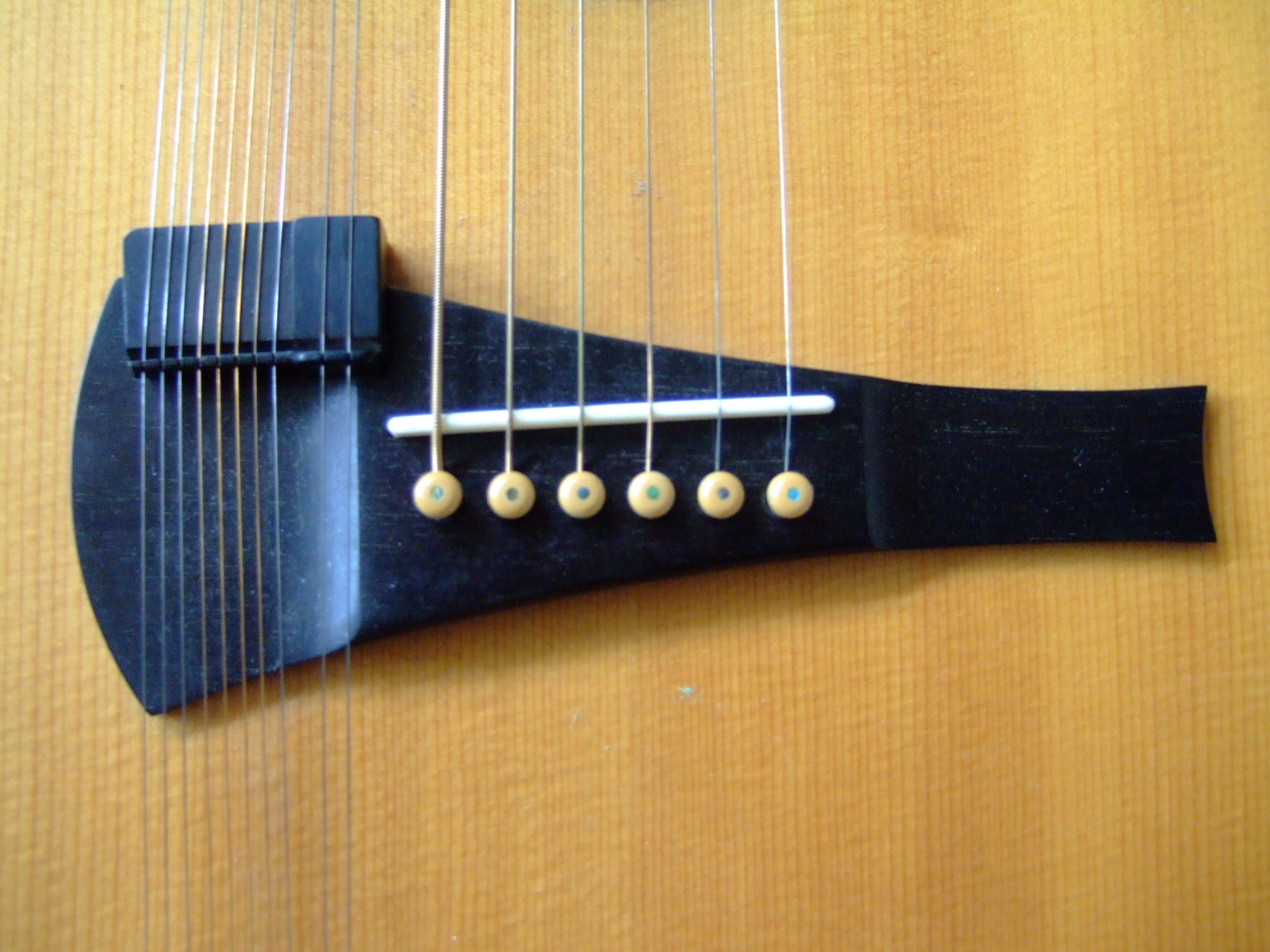

=== Present life ===
Liebeskind lives in Geneva where he takes part in the organisation of many concerts including Les Aubes Musicales. These performances are held on the shore of Lac Léman at dawn in the summer in the months of July–August.

He recently created his own music label "New Healing Sounds" on which he continues to release previously recorded music of his own as well as of many other musicians from diverse cultures and ethnicities.

== Discography ==
As a musician and composer *

- Marc Liebeskind Quartet "Uma Chamada Brasileira" (1991)
- Duvida (1993)
- Marc Liebeskind Quartet "Snowmoe" (1996)
- Little big beats (1997)
- Ganga Ma (2001)
- Taffetas "Taffetas" (2004)
- Ganga Gheet (2006)
- Taffetas "Cameleon" (2006)
- Fatoumata Dembélé "N'naniba" (2007)
- Marc Liebeskind – Sit Guitar "GendeRevolution" (2008)
- Madou Zerbo "Layidou" (2009)
- Marc Liebeskind "Atman Project" (2011)
- Gemeos (2017)
- Indian Times (2020)
