= National Treasure: Book of Secrets (soundtrack) =

Soundtrack album by Trevor Rabin
- Released: December 18, 2007
- Recorded: 2007
- Genre: Soundtrack
- Length: 22:37
- Label: Walt Disney
- Producer: Trevor Rabin

The score to National Treasure: Book of Secrets was composed by Trevor Rabin and recorded with the Hollywood Studio Symphony at the Todd AO Scoring Stage in October and November 2007. It was the last feature film score to be recorded at the stage before it was closed down.

The soundtrack album was released by Walt Disney Records as a digital download release through iTunes, and no physical discs were manufactured.

== Track listing ==
All music is composed by Trevor Rabin.

No.	Title	Length
1.	"Page 47"	2:39
2.	"Cibola"	5:16
3.	"Spirit of Paris"	2:20
4.	"City of Gold"	2:13
5.	"So!"	1:46
6.	"Bunnies"	2:03
7.	"Gabby Shuffle"	1:52
8.	"Franklin's Tunnel"	4:28
Total length:		22:37
