= Something to Hold on To (disambiguation) =

"Something to Hold on To" is a song by Trevor Rabin.

It may also refer to:

- Something to Hold Onto, album by Saving Jane
- "Something to Hold on To" (Emily Warren song)
- "Something to Hold On To" (Turnpike Troubadours song)
- "Something to Hold on To" (Bilal song)
