= Boys Will Be Boys! =

Boys Will Be Boys

Studio album by Rabbitt
- Released: 1975
- Recorded: 1974–1975
- Studio: RPM Studios (Johannesburg)
- Genre: Rock
- Label: Jo'Burg
- Producer: Trevor Rabin; Julian Laxton; Patrick van Blerk

Rabbitt chronology
Boys Will Be Boys (1975)	A Croak and a Grunt in the Night (1977)

Professional ratings
Review scores
Source	Rating
AllMusic	4/5 stars

Boys Will Be Boys! is the debut studio album by South African rock band Rabbitt, released in 1975 on Jo'Burg Records. The album earned a gold certification in the country faster than any other previously released album in South Africa at the time. The group won a Sarie Award in the Best Contemporary Pop category. In 1989, Boys Will Be Boys! was reissued in Germany and the United States.

== Track listing ==
1. "Something's Going Wrong with My Baby" (Trevor Rabin) — 4:45
2. "Savage" (Rabin) — 4:43
3. "Lifeline" (Patrick van Blerk, Rabin) — 6:00
4. "Locomotive Breath" (Ian Anderson) — 3:35
5. "Hard Ride" (Rabin) — 4:05
6. "Baby's Leaving" (Rabin) — 2:20
7. "Eventides" (Rabin) — 2:34
8. "Looking for the Man" (Van Blerk, Rabin) — 4:00
9. "Death of Tulio" (Rabin) — 0:22
10. "Charlie" (Van Blerk, Rabin) — 2:35
11. "Brand New Love"* (Rabin) — 3:38
12. "Auld Lang Syne"* (Traditional) — 1:18
- *Bonus tracks on 2006 CD re-issue (Fresh Music)

== Personnel ==
Rabbitt

- Trevor Rabin – lead vocals (except "Hard Ride"), electric and acoustic guitars, keyboards, synthesizers
- Duncan Faure – keyboards, synthesizers, lead vocals on "Hard Ride"
- Ronnie Robot – bass guitar
- Neil Cloud – drums, percussion

Additional personnel

- Godfrey Rabin (Trevor's father) – violin solo on "Hard Ride"
- Pro Arte – strings arrangement
- Bram Verhoef – conductor

Production

- Trevor Rabin – arrangement, production
- Julian Laxton – production, engineering, mixing
- Patrick van Blerk – production
