= Wolf (Trevor Rabin album) =

Studio album by Trevor Rabin
- Released: 16 January 1981
- Recorded: Konk Studios, London
- Genre: Hard rock; pop rock
- Length: 41:32
- Label: Chrysalis
- Producer: Trevor Rabin

Trevor Rabin chronology
Face to Face (1979)	Wolf (1981)	Can't Look Away (1989)

Professional ratings
Review scores
Source	Rating
AllMusic	(No review)

Wolf is the third studio album by musician Trevor Rabin, released in 1981 through Chrysalis Records.

== Track listing ==
All tracks are written by Trevor Rabin, except where indicated.

No.	Title	Writer(s)	Length
1.	"Open Ended"		3:23
2.	"Heard You Cry Wolf"		5:44
3.	"Do Ya Do Ya Want Me"		3:29
4.	"Stop Turn"		4:06
5.	"Lost in Love"		3:47
6.	"Looking for a Lady (Wolfman)"		4:42
7.	"Pain"		4:33
8.	"Take Me to a Party"		3:41
9.	"She's Easy"		4:24
10.	"Long Island"	Rabin, Ray Davies	3:40
Total length:			41:32

== Personnel ==
- Trevor Rabin - vocals, guitar, bass, keyboards
- Jack Bruce - bass
- Mo Foster - bass
- Manfred Mann - keyboards
- John "Rabbit" Bundrick - keyboards
- Chris Thompson - vocals
- Stevie Lange - vocals
- Noel McCalla - vocals
- Simon Phillips - drums

Technical

- Ray Davies - associate producer
- Ben Fenner - engineer
- Peter Wagg - art direction
- Brian Cooke - photography
