= Beginnings (Trevor Rabin album) =

Trevor Rabin
- 1978 reissue front cover

Studio album by Trevor Rabin
- Released: 1977
- Studio: RPM Studios, Johannesburg, South Africa
- Genre: Rock, hard rock, progressive rock
- Length: 36:01
- Label: RPM (RPM 1122)
- Producer: Trevor Rabin

Trevor Rabin chronology
| Trevor Rabin (1977) | Face to Face (1979) |

Beginnings is the debut studio album by South African musician and singer-songwriter Trevor Rabin, released in 1977 on RPM Records. The original version has never been re-released. In 1978, the album was reissued as Trevor Rabin by Chrysalis Records. The Chrysalis version lost the songs Could There Be and Love Alive while adding the track Love Life. It was reissued in 2003 by Voiceprint Records.

== Track listing ==
All tracks composed by Trevor Rabin.

Side one
| No. | Title | Length |
|---|---|---|
| 1. | "Getting to Know You Better" | 4:00 |
| 2. | "Finding Me a Way Back Home" | 4:49 |
| 3. | "All I Want Is Your Love" | 3:40 |
| 4. | "Live a Bit" | 4:57 |

Side two
| No. | Title | Length |
|---|---|---|
| 5. | "Fantasy" | 3:19 |
| 6. | "Stay With Me" | 3:49 |
| 7. | "Red Desert" | 3:52 |
| 8. | "Painted Picture" | 3:33 |
| 9. | "Love Life" | 4:03 |

== Personnel ==
- Trevor Rabin – lead vocals, guitars, bass, keyboards
- Kevin Kruger – drums, percussion
- Godfrey Rabin (Trevor's father) – violin
- Gary Edwards – recording, mixing

== Charts ==
| Chart (1978) | Peak position |
|---|---|
| US Billboard 200 | 192 |
