= Face to Face (Trevor Rabin album) =

Studio album by Trevor Rabin
- Released: 1979
- Studio: RPM Studios, Johannesburg, South Africa and AIR Studios, London
- Genre: Rock, Pop
- Length: 36:35
- Label: Chrysalis
- Producer: Trevor Rabin

Trevor Rabin chronology
Trevor Rabin (1978)	Face to Face (1979)	Wolf (1981)

Professional ratings
Review scores
Source	Rating
AllMusic	3/5 stars

Face to Face is the second studio album by Trevor Rabin released in 1979. Rabin composed the songs except for two written by his manager, Pete Smith.

== Track listing ==
All tracks composed and arranged by Trevor Rabin; except where indicated

Side one
No.	Title	Writer(s)	Length
1.	"I'll Take the Weight"		3:57
2.	"Don't You Ever Lose"		4:02
3.	"I'm Old Enough (To Make You a Woman)"		4:14
4.	"The Wanderer"	Pete Smith	3:47
5.	"You"		2:39

Side two
No.	Title	Writer(s)	Length
6.	"Now"		4:50
7.	"The Ripper"	Smith	3:48
8.	"Candy's Bar"		4:02
9.	"Always The Last One"		5:06

== Personnel ==
- Trevor Rabin - vocals, guitar, bass, keyboards, backing vocals
- Kevin Kruger - drums
- Dave Mattacks - drums
- Rene Arnell - backing vocals

Technical

- Jon Kelly, Jon Walls - engineers
- Geoff Emerick, Hennie Hartmann - recording
