= Changes (Yes song) =

Song by Yes

from the album 90125
- Released: 7 November 1983
- Recorded: 1983
- Genre: Progressive rock
- Length: 6:20
- Label: Atco Records
- Songwriters: Trevor Rabin, Jon Anderson, Alan White
- Producer: Trevor Horn

"Changes" is a song by English band Yes, from their 1983 album, 90125. It reached number 6 on the U.S. Mainstream Rock chart in 1984.

== History ==
The basic musical and lyrical structure of "Changes" was written by Yes guitarist Trevor Rabin, prior to his joining the band. Once Rabin joined the band, additional music and lyrics were contributed by singer Jon Anderson and drummer Alan White for the version that would appear on 90125. White contributed the shifting minimalistic rhythmic figures and melodies used for the introduction, while Anderson adapted lyrics and parts of the melody (including the chorus and the addition of the "one word from you, one word from me" section of the bridge).

== Live performances ==
"Changes" was first played live on the tour supporting 90125 and also played on the Big Generator, Union and Talk tours. After Rabin's departure from the band, the song was permanently dropped from their setlist.

It would not be played live again until 2016 when Rabin joined vocalist Jon Anderson and keyboardist Rick Wakeman in forming Yes Featuring Jon Anderson, Trevor Rabin, Rick Wakeman.

== Alternate versions ==
Several live version of "Changes" have been released by the band: the 9012Live concert video, its companion album 9012Live: The Solos, and the 1991 box set Yesyears each include a live version of the song.

In 2003, Trevor Rabin released a pair of albums, each of which featured a different version of "Changes": Live in LA features a 1989 live performance of the song, and 90124 features an early demo of the song before Anderson and White's contributions were added.

== Charts ==
Chart (1983)	Peak position
US Mainstream Rock (Billboard)	6
