= Eckard Rabe =

South African actor

- Born: 1948; St Winifreds, Natal, South Africa
- Occupation(s): Actor, Teacher
- Spouse: Jo da Silva (1996-2007)
- Children: Caitlin Bianca
- Awards: Fleur du Cap Award Best Supporting Actor For The Norman Conquests; 1979

Eckard Rabe is a former South African film, television and theatre actor. He is now a teacher at Parktown Boys' High School. He was born in 1948 in St Winifreds, Natal and grew up in Port Shepstone. He acted as the business tycoon and patriarch of the Edwards family on the local soap opera, Egoli - Place of Gold from 1995 to 2009. He has one daughter, Caitlin Bianca, by actress Jo Da Silva.

== Filmography ==
- Ballade vir 'n Enkeling (2015)
- Getroud met Rugby: Die Onvertelde Storie (2011)
- Catch a Fire (2006)
- Act of Piracy (1990)
- American Ninja 3: Blood Hunt (1989)
- Paradise Road (1988)
- Kampus: 'n Varsity-Storie (1986)
- Plekkie in die son (1979)
- Springbok (1976)
- Daar Kom Tant Alie (1976)
- Dog Squad (1973)

== Television ==
- 7de Laan (2010)
- Wild at Heart (2010)
- Egoli: Place of Gold (1995–2009)
- Westgate (1981)
- The Dingleys (1977)

== Teacher ==
Eckard Rabe is now an English teacher at Parktown Boys' High School
