= 90124 =

Compilation album by Trevor Rabin
- Released: 2003
- Genre: Rock, hard rock, progressive rock
- Length: 53:08
- Label: Voiceprint
- Producer: Trevor Rabin

Trevor Rabin chronology
Live in LA (2003)	90124 (2003)	Jacaranda (2012)

90124 is a compilation album by South African musician Trevor Rabin, released in 2003 on Voiceprint Records. It contains previously unreleased demos and songs that he wrote as a solo artist, some of which were recorded by Yes when he joined the band in 1983. The album's title and artwork both directly reference 90125 (1983), the first Yes album to feature Rabin that was produced mainly from his demos included on 90124.

"Walls" features Supertramp singer Roger Hodgson on vocals, recorded when he was invited to sing with Yes, though Jon Anderson's return ended this idea. Nonetheless, Rabin and Hodgson became close friends and Rabin played guitar, keyboards and backing vocals on Hodgson's song "The More I Look", featured on Open the Door. "Where Will You Be?" is an instrumental of the same titled song recorded on the Yes album Talk (1994) on which Rabin plays every instrument.

== Track listing ==
All tracks are written by Trevor Rabin, except as noted.

No.	Title	Writer(s)	Length
1.	"Hold On (Demo 1981)"		6:19
2.	"Changes (Demo 1981)"		3:11
3.	"Moving In"		5:32
4.	"Would You Feel My Love"		5:01
5.	"Where Will You Be (Demo 1991)"		5:06
6.	"Owner of a Lonely Heart (Demo 1981)"		7:02
7.	"Walls (Demo 1990)"	Rabin, Roger Hodgson	4:20
8.	"Promenade"	Mussorgsky, arr. Rabin	1:44
9.	"Love Will Find a Way"		3:30
10.	"Miracle of Life"	Rabin, Mark Mancina	6:57
11.	"Don't Give In" (Demo of "Make It Easy")		4:32

== Personnel ==
- Trevor Rabin – vocals, electric and acoustic guitars, bass guitar, keyboards, drums, percussion.
- Roger Hodgson – vocals on "Walls"
