= Live in LA (Trevor Rabin album) =

Live album by Trevor Rabin
- Released: 4 February 2003
- Recorded: 13 December 1989 at the Roxy Theatre, Los Angeles, California, U.S.
- Genre: Hard rock, progressive rock, pop rock
- Length: 64:34
- Label: Voiceprint
- Producer: Trevor Rabin

Trevor Rabin chronology
| Can't Look Away (1989) | Live in LA (2003) | 90124 (2003) |

Live in LA a live album by South African musician Trevor Rabin, released on 4 February 2003 on Voiceprint Records. It was recorded on 13 December 1989 at the Roxy Theatre, Los Angeles during Rabin's tour of the United States to promote his fourth solo album, Can't Look Away (1989).

== Track listing ==
| No. | Title | Writer(s) | Length |
|---|---|---|---|
| 1. | "Cover Up" | Trevor Rabin, Godfrey Rabin, Anthony Moore | 8:14 |
| 2. | "Sorrow (Your Heart)" | T. Rabin | 4:45 |
| 3. | "Heard You Cry Wolf" | T. Rabin | 5:33 |
| 4. | "Changes" | Jon Anderson, T. Rabin, Alan White | 6:14 |
| 5. | "Eyes of Love" | T. Rabin, Bob Ezrin | 8:14 |
| 6. | "Love Will Find a Way" | T. Rabin | 4:28 |
| 7. | "Sludge" | T. Rabin | 5:11 |
| 8. | "Can't Look Away" | T. Rabin, Ezrin, Moore | 11:53 |
| 9. | "Owner of a Lonely Heart" | Anderson, Trevor Horn, T. Rabin, Chris Squire | 4:57 |
| 10. | "Something to Hold on To" | T. Rabin | 5:05 |
| Total length: | | | 64:34 |

== Personnel ==
- Trevor Rabin – lead vocals, guitar
- Lou Molino III – drums, percussion
- Mark Mancina – keyboard, backing vocals
- Jim Simmons – bass, backing vocals
