= Shoot High Aim Low =

Song by Yes

from the album Big Generator
- Released: 28 September 1987
- Length: 7:03
- Label: Atco Records
- Composer(s): Jon Anderson, Tony Kaye, Trevor Rabin, Chris Squire, Alan White
- Lyricist(s): Jon Anderson, Trevor Rabin
- Producer(s): Yes, Trevor Horn, Trevor Rabin, Paul De Villiers

"Shoot High Aim Low" is a song by Yes. It appears on the band's 1987 album, Big Generator. The song reached position #11 on the Mainstream Rock Tracks chart in the 1980s. It appeared on every show on the Big Generator tour, but nowhere else to date.

== Meaning ==
The song, according to Jon Anderson's announcements on many shows of the tour, is about war; specifically, a future in which mankind will live beyond war. In most of these announcements, Anderson explains that the "Bluefields" mentioned in the first line are in Nicaragua. At the time the album was being worked on, a legal battle between the U.S. and Nicaragua had occurred over U.S. aid to anti-government guerrillas.

Anderson also explains on some occasions that Trevor Rabin, who performs lead vocals on the song (alternating with Anderson) is singing in "dreamtime", while Anderson is singing in real time.

== Live performances ==
In live performances, the song usually appeared just prior to "Big Generator". It would typically last, discounting announcements, for about 8 minutes 30 seconds. Rabin's electric guitar solo was somewhat extended live, but typically only by a short amount of time. By November 22, 1987, this song was performed after "Big Generator."

A live version can be found on the live box set The Word is Live.

== Personnel ==
- Jon Anderson – vocals
- Chris Squire – bass guitar, backing vocals
- Trevor Rabin – guitar, lead and backing vocals, keyboards, mixing, production, string arrangements
- Tony Kaye – keyboards
- Alan White – drums, percussion
- Trevor Horn – production

== Charts ==
Chart (1987)	Peak position
US Mainstream Rock (Billboard)	11
