= Rabbitt =

South African pop rock band

- Rabbitt, 1976 (back to front: Neil Cloud, Ronnie Robot. Duncan Faure, Trevor Rabin)

Background information
- Origin: Johannesburg, South Africa
- Genres: Pop rock; dance-rock
- Years active: 1972–1978; 2024–present
- Labels: Capricorn; Voiceprint; Map; Jo'Burg; Jet; Line; Victor (Japan)
- Spinoff of: The Conglomoration
- Members: Duncan Faure; Neil Cloud; Ronnie Robot
- Past members: Trevor Rabin; Errol Friedman; Fransula Roos; Lou Forer; Cedric Samson; Selwyn Schneider

Rabbitt is a South African pop rock band formed in Johannesburg in 1972, originally consisting of Trevor Rabin, Duncan Faure, Ronnie Robot (Ronald Friedman), and Neil Cloud. Known for their blend of rock, pop, and progressive elements, Rabbitt was of the South Africa's most popular bands in the 1970s, sometimes referred to as that country's version of The Beatles or Bay City Rollers due to their enthusiastic fan base. Their 1976 single "Charlie" reached the top of the South African charts.

== History ==
The members of Rabbitt were first in the teen rock band The Conglomeration, which formed in the late 1960s, but moved toward more mature and polished music by transitioning to the name Rabbitt in 1972. Rabin and Faure both provided lead vocals, guitar, and keyboards, with Robot on bass and Cloud on drums. They sought to combine progressive rock influences from groups like Yes and Genesis with accessible pop melodies. The band worked closely with producer Patrick van Blerk.

Starting in 1975 they released three albums on the Jo’Burg label: Boys Will Be Boys!, A Croak and a Grunt in the Night, and Rock Rabbitt; with two of those also released in the United States by Capricorn Records. Their 1976 single "Charlie" became a nationwide hit in South Africa and gained them a fervent fab following that was dubbed "Rabbittmania" by the media."

The band disbanded in 1978 when Rabin left to pursue a solo career; he would later join Yes. Faure also embarked on a solo career and later recorded three albums with Bay City Rollers. Faure, Robot, and Cloud reunited for nostalgic performances in 2024.

== Members ==
- Trevor Rabin – vocals, lead guitar, keyboards (1972–1978)
- Ronnie Robot (Ronald Friedman) – bass guitar (1972–1978, 2024–present)
- Neil Cloud – drums (1972–1978, 2024–present)
- Duncan Faure – vocals, keyboards, guitar (1972–1978, 2024–present)
- Errol Friedman – guitar (1972)
- Fransula Roos – keyboards (1972)
- Lou Forer – bass (1972)
- Cedric Samson – drums (1972)
- Selwyn Schneider – guitar (1973)

== Discography ==
=== Studio albums ===
- Boys Will Be Boys! (1975)
- A Croak and a Grunt in the Night (1977)
- Rock Rabbitt (1977)

=== Compilations ===
- Revival (1987)
- The Collection (compilation, 1992)
- The Hits (compilation, 1996)

=== EPs ===
- Rock 'n' Roll, Volume 2 (1977)
- Morning Light (1977)
- 1972-1978 (1978)

=== Singles ===
- "Locomotive Breath" / "And the Planets Danced" (1972)
- "Backdoor of My Heart" / "Share the Loving Things" (1973)
- "Hallelujah Sunrise" / "Hidden Feelings" (1973)
- "Yesterday's Papers" (1974)
- "Charlie" / "Looking for the Man" (1976)
- "Hard Ride" / "Baby's Leaving" (1976)
- "Hold on to Love" / "Working for the People" (1976)
- "Sugar Pie" / "Dingleys Bookshop" (1976)
- "Eventides" / "Charlie"(1977)
- "Everybody's Cheating" / "Gift of Love" (1977)
- "Hold on to Love" / "Working for the People" (1977)
- "Morning Light" / "Auld Lang Syne Rock" (1977)
- "Gettin' Thru to You (Teenage Love)" / "Hello and Welcome Home" (1977)
