= Moon Guitars =

Scottish guitar manufacturer

Moon Guitars is a guitar shop, making customised instruments, located in Scotland. It was established in 1969 by Jimmy Moon in a small workshop on the Island of Arran in Scotland. The company has produced custom instruments for Big Country, Altered Images, Simple Minds, Wet Wet Wet, Scissor Sisters, Coldplay and Del Amitri. They mainly produce acoustic guitars and mandolins. Some of the woods used in manufacturing include Indian rosewood, maple, mahogany, ebony and Alaskan spruce. They produce around 200 guitars a year, with a regular acoustic taking between six and twelve weeks to make, and up to nine months for a customised model. Other notable clients include; Bryan Adams, Keith Scott, Dougie MacLean, Paolo Nutini, Trevor Rabin, Adele and Steve Earle.
