= Center for the Arts, University at Buffalo =

Coordinates: 43°0′3.5″N 78°46′59″W

Center for the Arts
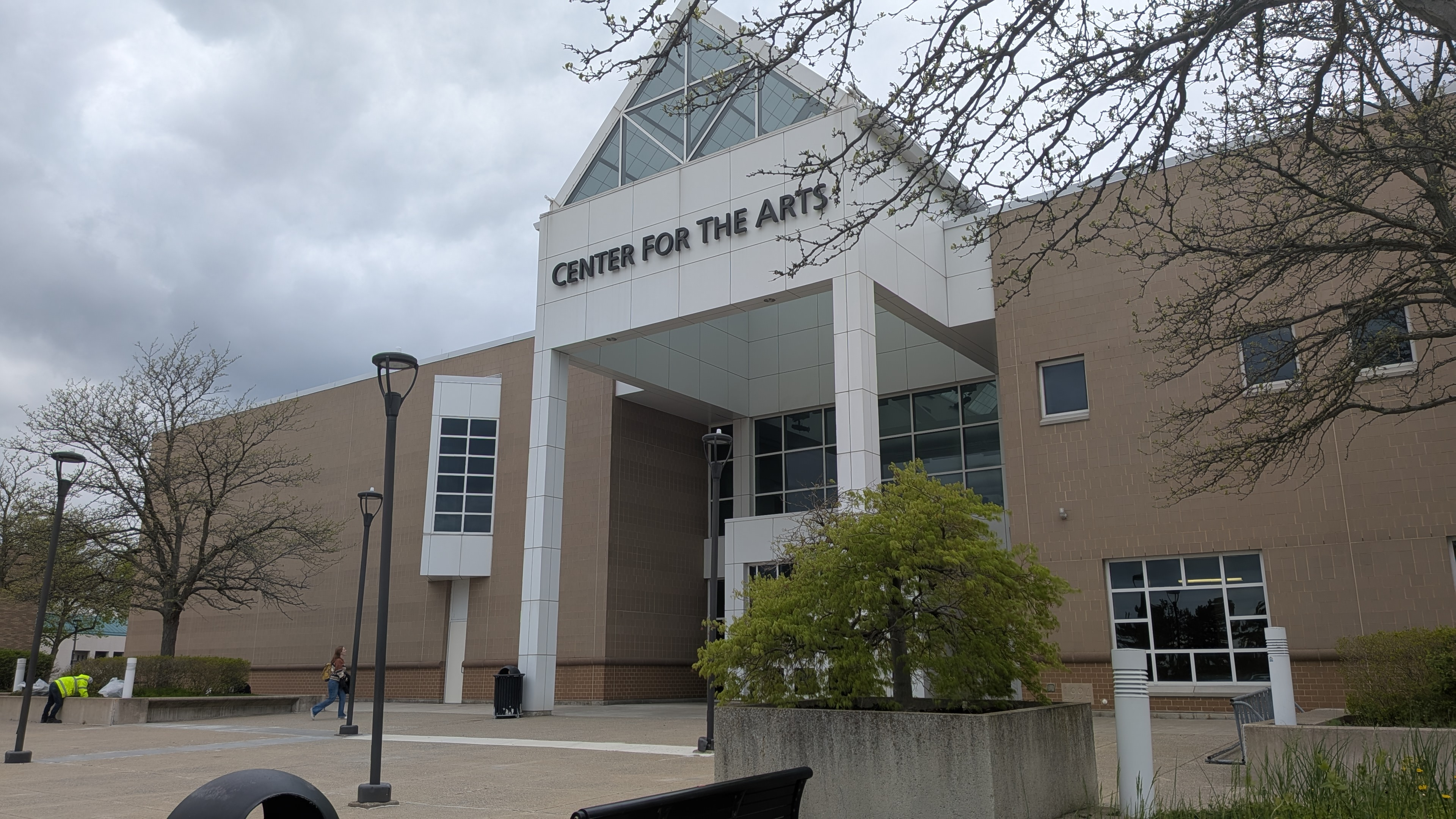
- Interactive map of Center for the Arts
- Address: Amherst, New York; United States
- Owner: University at Buffalo, The State University of New York
- Capacity: Mainstage: 1,748; Drama: 378; Black Box: 150
- Type: Performing arts center

Construction
- Opened: 1994
- Architects: Gwathmey Siegel & Architects Associates

Website
- www.ubcfa.org

The Center for the Arts at the University at Buffalo is a cultural institution established in 1994 on the University at Buffalo North Campus in Amherst. This multidisciplinary arts center is a public venue for theatrical and artistic performances, exhibitions and events, and also is a teaching facility for students in arts disciplines such as media studies, art, theatre, and dance.

The Center for the Arts presents a wide range of high quality performing arts and visual arts for the University, the State and the region, and enhances and augment the academic activities of the fine and performing arts departments at the University at Buffalo.

Through its facilities and programs, the Center for the Arts plays a significant role in accomplishing the mission of the University, presenting enriched educational and cultural opportunities through University performances, state and regional events, and national and international touring productions and exhibits.

== History ==
Designed by Gwathmey Siegel & Architects Associates LLC, the building was erected for $50 million. The 236,500-square-foot (21,970 m^{2}) facility was opened by the fall semester of 1994 as the Fine Arts Center, and was renamed the Center for the Arts, its current name, later that year.

== Academic use ==
The Center for the Arts also serves as an academic facility for arts programs at the University at Buffalo. A University at Buffalo News Center article published when the building opened described it as containing teaching and administrative areas as well as performance and exhibition spaces. University at Buffalo Libraries identifies the building as housing the academic departments and programs of Visual Studies, Art Management, Media Study, and Theatre and Dance, as well as the UB Art Gallery.

The building includes performance, exhibition, and media-production spaces. A university building profile lists facilities including the Mainstage Theatre, Drama Theatre, Black Box Theatre, a media screening room, video production and sound studios, galleries, and dance/performance studios. The Department of Media Study describes its facilities in the Center for the Arts as supporting analog film production, digital media production, animation, virtual reality, physical computing, and sound recording.

== Theatres ==
=== Mainstage Theatre ===
Seating 1750, the Mainstage is the largest theatre in the Center. Featuring entirely professional productions, this theatre features a computer-tunable wall system for acoustics, a movable proscenium, a custom built orchestra shell, and a large 106 ft (32 m) wide by 48 ft (15 m) deep stage.

=== Drama Theatre ===
The Center's other proscenium theatre, the Drama Theatre is a smaller theatre (seating 400). Like its larger companion, it too features a movable proscenium. It is fully trapped. It is 69 ft (21 m) wide by 34 ft (10 m) deep.

=== Black Box Theatre ===
The smallest of the theatres in the facility, the Black Box Theatre, is designed with the standard flexibility of a Black box theater, supporting 175 seats in various configurations.
