= Something to Hold on To =

Single by Trevor Rabin

from the album Can't Look Away
- B-side: "I Miss You Now"
- Released: 25 August 1989 (Japan); 16 October 1989 (UK)
- Genre: Hard rock, pop rock, arena rock
- Length: 4:22
- Label: Elektra
- Songwriter: Trevor Rabin
- Producers: Trevor Rabin, Bob Ezrin

Trevor Rabin singles chronology
"Take Me to a Party" (1981)	"Something to Hold on To" (1989)	"Sorrow (Your Heart)" (1989)

"Something to Hold on To" is a single by the musician Trevor Rabin, released in 1989 through Elektra Records. The single and its b-side, "I Miss You Now", both appear on Rabin's fourth studio album, Can't Look Away. "Something to Hold on To" reaching No. 3 on the U.S. Billboard Mainstream Rock chart and its accompanying music video being nominated for Best Video, Short Form at the 1990 Grammy Awards.

== Track listing ==
All music is composed by Trevor Rabin.

No.	Title	Length
1.	"Something to Hold on To"	4:22
2.	"I Miss You Now"	5:33
Total length:		9:55

== Charts ==
Chart (1989)	Peak position
Canada Top Singles (RPM)	66
US Mainstream Rock (Billboard)	3
