= Freedom's Children =

South African progressive / psychedelic rock band

Freedom's Children was a rock band from Durban, KwaZulu-Natal, South Africa. It was founded in 1966 and lasted until 1971. Its style was progressive rock, psychedelic rock, and acid rock. At the center of the band was songwriter and bass player Ramsay MacKay, guitarist Ken E Henson, keyboardist Nic Maartens, drummer Colin Pratley and vocalist Brian Davidson.

== Discography ==
Albums

- 1969: Battle Hymn of the Broken-Hearted Horde (Parlophone)
- 1970: Astra (Parlophone)
- 1971: Galactic Vibes (Parlophone)
