= William C. Faure =

- Born: 17 July 1949; South Africa
- Died: 18 October 1994 (aged 45); Johannesburg, South Africa
- Occupation: Film director
- Years active: 1974–1994

William C. Faure (17 July 1949 – 18 October 1994) was a South African film director and writer, best known for directing Shaka Zulu, a 1986 television mini-series.

== Death ==
He died at the age of 45 in Johannesburg of kidney failure.
