= Can't Look Away =

Studio album by Trevor Rabin
- Released: 31 July 1989
- Studio: Various: Westlake, Hollywood; Rumbo, Canoga Park; A&M, Hollywood; Shed, Zimbabwe; Audio Lab, Tampa; Southcombe, Burbank
- Genre: Hard rock; Progressive rock; Pop rock; Arena rock; Album-oriented rock
- Length: 55:31
- Label: Elektra
- Producer: Trevor Rabin, Bob Ezrin

Trevor Rabin chronology
| Wolf (1981) | Can't Look Away (1989) | Live in LA (2003) |

Singles from Can't Look Away
- 1. "Something to Hold on To" Released: 25 August 1989

Can't Look Away is the fourth studio album by the singer-songwriter and musician Trevor Rabin, released on 31 July 1989 by Elektra Records. The album reached No. 111 on the U.S. Billboard 200 during a stay of ten weeks. "Something to Hold on To" was released as a single and reached No. 3 on Billboard's Mainstream Rock chart, with its accompanying music video receiving a nomination for Best Video, Short Form at the 1990 Grammy Awards. In a 2004 interview, Rabin described Can't Look Away as "by far my best solo album and the one I'm happiest with". The album was reissued in 2011 by Voiceprint Records.

== Critical reception ==
Professional ratings
Review scores
| Source | Rating |
|---|---|
| AllMusic | 3/5 stars |

Vik Iyengar of AllMusic gave Can't Look Away three stars out of five. He praised it for having "a great sense of melody and layered guitars to create an arena rock sound", while also remarking that "Although the album loses a bit of steam in the second half, the first half includes great pop/rock tunes. ... Fans of latter-day Yes should definitely check out this album".

== Track listing ==
All tracks written by Trevor Rabin, with additional writers noted.

| No. | Title | Writer(s) | Length |
|---|---|---|---|
| 1. | "I Can't Look Away" | Bob Ezrin, Anthony Moore | 7:22 |
| 2. | "Something to Hold on To" | | 5:07 |
| 3. | "Sorrow (Your Heart)" | | 4:29 |
| 4. | "Cover Up" | Godfrey Rabin, Moore | 5:17 |
| 5. | "Promises" | | 5:57 |
| 6. | "Etoile Noir (Note: Some editions combine "Etoile Noir" and "Eyes of Love" into one track.)" (instrumental) | | 1:03 |
| 7. | "Eyes of Love" | Ezrin | 6:24 |
| 8. | "I Didn't Think It Would Last" | Ezrin | 4:08 |
| 9. | "Hold on to Me" | Patric van Blerk | 4:44 |
| 10. | "Sludge" (instrumental) | | 2:26 |
| 11. | "I Miss You Now" | | 5:38 |
| 12. | "The Cape" (instrumental) | | 2:56 |
| Total length: | | | 55:31 |

== Personnel ==
- Trevor Rabin – lead vocals, guitar, guitar synthesizer, keyboard, bass, backing vocals (tracks 2, 3, 5, 7–9), engineering, production
- Lou Molino III – drums (tracks 1–3, 8, 10)
- Alan White – drums (tracks 4, 11)
- Denny Fongheiser – drums (track 7)
- "Basil" – drum machine (tracks 4, 5, 9, 11)
- Duncan Faure – backing vocals (tracks 2, 3, 5, 7–9)
- Tsidii Le Loka – backing vocals (tracks 3–5, 7)
- Beulah Hashe – backing vocals (tracks 3–5, 7)
- Faith Kekana – backing vocals (tracks 3–5, 7)
- Marilyn Nokwe – backing vocals (tracks 3–5, 7)

Technical

- Bob Ezrin – backing vocals (tracks 3, 7), engineering, production
- Stan Katayama – engineering
- Rick Butz – engineering
- Julian Stoll – engineering
- Dave Subkleve – engineering
- Julie Last – engineering
- Tom Banghart – engineering
- Ringo Hrycyna – engineering

== Charts ==
| Chart (1989) | Peak position |
|---|---|
| US Billboard 200 | 111 |

== Awards ==
| Event | Title | Award | Result |
|---|---|---|---|
| 1990 Grammys | "Something to Hold on To" | Best Video, Short Form | Nominated |
