= Yes Featuring Jon Anderson, Trevor Rabin, Rick Wakeman =

Progressive rock band (2010–2018)

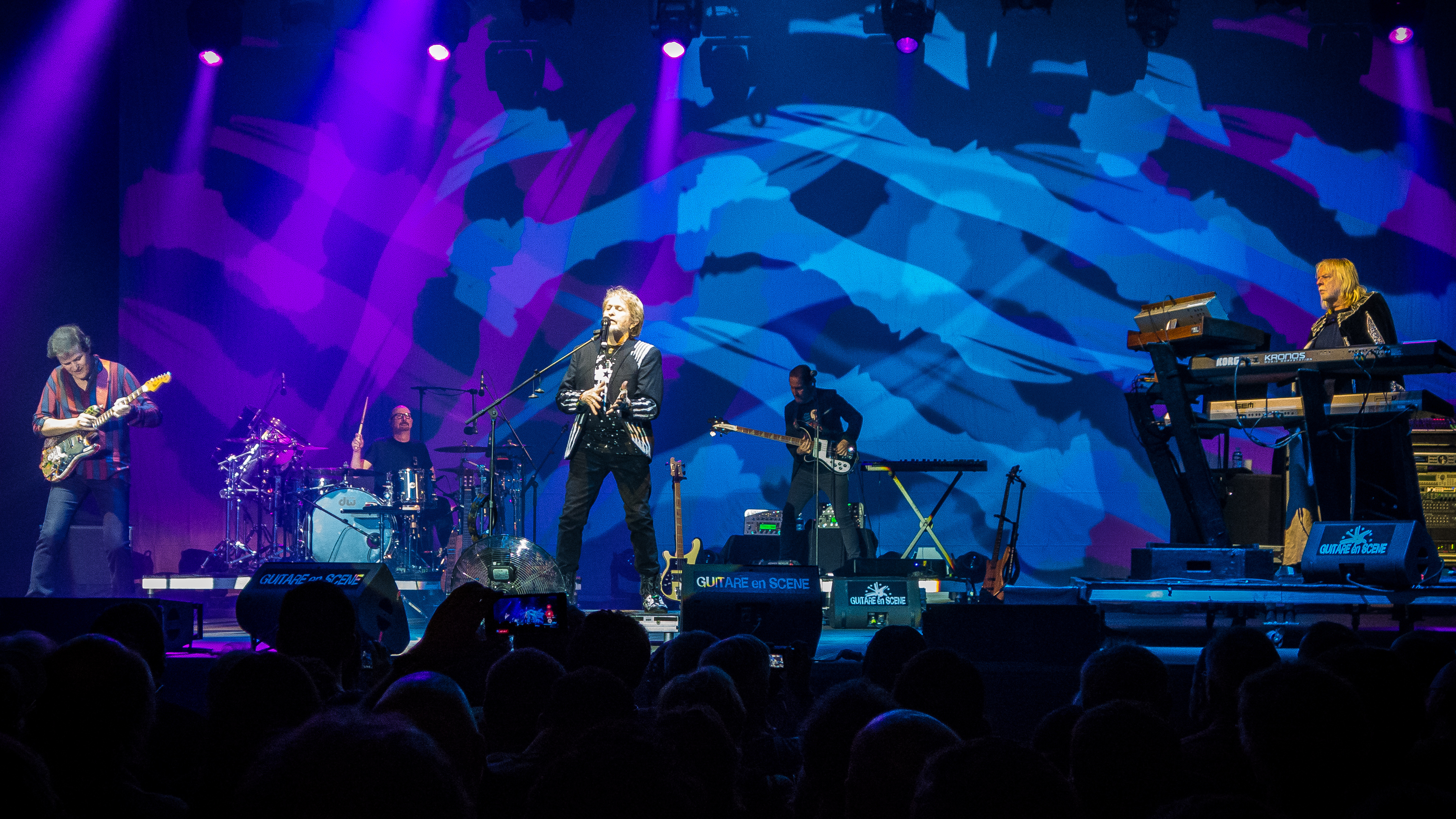
- ARW at Festival Guitare en Scène 2017, from left to right: Trevor Rabin, Lou Molino III, Jon Anderson, Lee Pomeroy, Rick Wakeman

Background information
- Also known as: Anderson, Rabin and Wakeman (2010–2017)
- Genres: Progressive rock; pop rock
- Years active: 2010–2018
- Label: Eagle
- Past members: Jon Anderson; Trevor Rabin; Rick Wakeman; Lee Pomeroy; Lou Molino III

Yes Featuring Jon Anderson, Trevor Rabin, Rick Wakeman, also known as Anderson, Rabin and Wakeman (ARW), were a progressive rock band founded by former Yes members Jon Anderson (vocals, acoustic guitar), Trevor Rabin (guitar, vocals), and Rick Wakeman (keyboards) in an offshoot of the band. The three had previously worked together in Yes for the 1991–1992 Union Tour. The trio were first announced as working together in 2010.

After working together on new music since 2011, the band announced activity in January 2016 as Anderson, Rabin and Wakeman. Plans for a possible studio album were put on hold to concentrate on touring; their debut worldwide tour, An Evening of Yes Music and More, began in October 2016 and continued through to 2017, with bassist Lee Pomeroy and drummer Lou Molino III. In April 2017, following the three members being inducted into the Rock and Roll Hall of Fame as part of Yes, the band announced their new name, which they had already been using in European touring.

After the conclusion of a 50th anniversary tour in 2018, there was no further public activity and the group confirmed by 2020 that the split was permanent.

== History ==
=== Formation ===
Singer Jon Anderson, singer and guitarist Trevor Rabin, and keyboardist Rick Wakeman were former members of the progressive rock band Yes. Anderson had co-founded Yes with bassist Chris Squire in 1968, and had been a member in three stints until 2008; Wakeman had been a member in five stints between 1971 and 2004; Rabin had been a member from 1983 to 1995. The only time the three had performed together in Yes was the 1991–1992 Union Tour during the band's short time as an eight-member formation. Plans to have Wakeman play with Anderson and Rabin on Talk (1994) never materialised. For Wakeman, not playing on a Yes studio album with Rabin became one of his regrets. Away from Yes, each pair had worked together in various capacities.

The first announcement of activity between the three came on the 6 February 2010 episode of Wakeman's radio show on Planet Rock, when he mentioned a recent discussion among himself, Rabin, "and a couple of other ex-members of Yes who will remain nameless" about the idea of recording a new album. This was later revealed to include Anderson. Rumours that former Yes drummer Bill Bruford was to be a participant caught some momentum after they were reported in rock music magazines. After several weeks of speculation about the rumour, Bruford wrote a blog entry on his website in May 2010 stressing his retirement from performance in 2009, and denied any involvement in such plans with the claim that he was not invited by either member. Developments on the project then progressed slowly, mainly because of the remaining three members' commitments to their solo projects and conflicting schedules. In October 2010, Rabin said that the group had yet to formally begin work on the project, but noted Anderson and himself were "really itching" to proceed. There was writing and development work from 2011.

Squire's death in June 2015 became a catalyst for the three to, as Wakeman said, progress with plans, record new music, and play Yes music on stage "as we feel it should be performed". In December 2015, Brian Lane, manager of Wakeman for the past three years and the manager of Yes in the 1970s, encouraged the three to formally launch the band. Rabin felt it was the right time as he wished to take a break from scoring films, and Wakeman was prepared to devote time to take part. On 9 January 2016, Rabin announced via his Facebook page that the three plan to tour later in the year. Two days later, Anderson posted an update revealing the group's name as Anderson, Rabin and Wakeman (ARW for short). Later that month, Wakeman confirmed Lane as the band's manager. Rabin stressed the group do not intend to be a rival of Yes and maintains there are no negative feelings towards them. News of the band's formation was welcomed by current Yes keyboardist Geoff Downes, and guitarist Steve Howe wished them good luck, but immediately followed this with approval of "cover bands."

=== Touring and name change ===
In June 2016, the band agreed to put their album "on the back burner" and make their debut tour a priority. Anderson reasoned the decision down to the little amount of time available for the group to tour and exchange music, in addition to the fact that the group were unsure how or what to record. He also said that the "important thing is to establish ourselves." Preparations for the tour began in mid-2016 in Los Angeles, which involved Anderson, Rabin, and two supporting musicians: English bassist Lee Pomeroy and American drummer Lou Molino III, both longtime bandmates of Wakeman and Rabin, respectively. Wakeman joined them in early August for a week's rehearsals. The five were to be joined by American multi-instrumentalist Gary Cambra, but his involvement was soon withdrawn. Larry Magid was appointed as the tour's director after Lane contacted him with the offer; Magid, who first worked with Yes in 1971 and kept good relations with the members, agreed as the project seemed interesting and fun. Jonathan Smeeton became involved to manage the stage production and lighting.

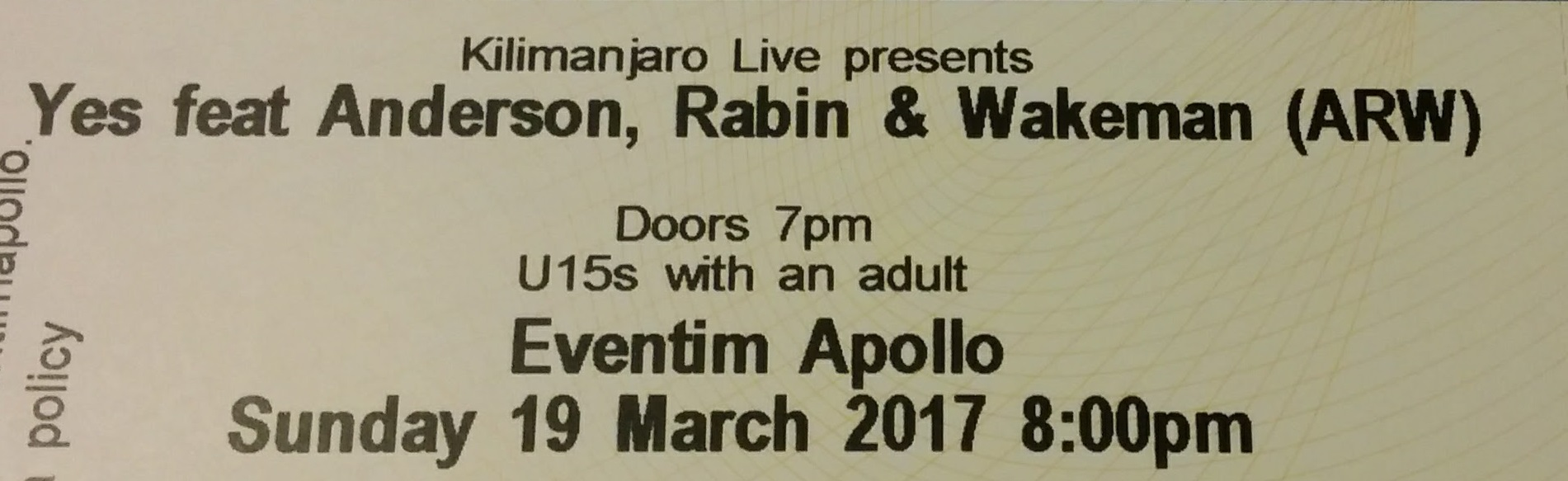
In early 2017, the band started calling itself "Yes featuring Anderson, Rabin and Wakeman". (Ticket for the London performance shown.)

The An Evening of Yes Music and More tour began in October 2016 and finished one year later, covering North America, Europe, Asia, and the Middle East. The group performed a setlist of Yes songs that cover various eras of Yes's career, from The Yes Album (1971) to Union (1991), as well as Anderson Bruford Wakeman Howe's only studio album.

On 9 April 2017, the band issued a press release which announced their name change to Yes Featuring Jon Anderson, Trevor Rabin, Rick Wakeman, a name that had been used on the prior European leg of touring.

The band's Quintessential Yes: The 50th Anniversary Tour was held to commemorate the fiftieth anniversary of Yes from June to September 2018. The initial plan was for the group to perform 100 dates worldwide, but Rabin resisted the idea and has implied otherwise. At around this time, the wives of both Jon Anderson and Rick Wakeman were diagnosed with breast cancer, with a resultant impact on touring (the latter causing the last tour leg to be cut short).

On 7 September 2018, the band released a recording of their March 25, 2017, show at the Manchester Apollo on a live album and DVD/Blu-ray titled Live at the Apollo from Eagle Records.

=== Cancelled studio album and disbandment ===
A studio album was in progress from April 2011, which began when Anderson and Rabin exchanged musical ideas online by sharing music files recorded at their home studios, to which Wakeman then incorporated his own later. Anderson described their new songs as "unique"; Wakeman said they sound "Very fresh, full of life, energy and melody". Development on the material halted in March 2012 when Rabin needed time with his family and his career in film scoring, and Wakeman had become too busy with other commitments. Activity resumed six months later with Wakeman submitting additional ideas to Anderson. Music was worked on progressively thereafter. In June 2016, Rabin said that the group had assembled just "bits and pieces of song ideas", and that offers had been made by record labels, but all were declined so the trio could maintain control over the album's musical direction. Three months later, they decided not to play their new music on their debut tour because of the likelihood that audience recordings of the new songs would surface online while they were still being worked on. The album was expected for release in late 2018 or early 2019, but was never given a specific release date or even a title. Anderson revealed one idea which involved releasing the music in three phases as some of it may contain pieces of extended length.

In July 2018, the first original song by the band, "Fragile", had its debut broadcast on Steve Jones' radio show Jonesy's Jukebox on KLOS-FM in Los Angeles. It is based on a piece by Rabin that initially appeared in 2015 over the end credits of an episode of the American television drama series Agent X, for which Rabin contributed to its score.

In March 2019, lead singer Jon Anderson announced that the band had no plans for further touring or recording, citing "mismanagement" of the band and a failure to agree on whether to release new music or perform existing Yes material exclusively. In July 2019, Wakeman said that the band would regroup for a tour in 2020, after which they planned to "close the lid on it". However, he did not rule out releasing new music, stating that it depended on the quality: "I would like to think we can leave one final burst of music that we can be proud of and, perhaps, we'd like to think that Yes fans have been waiting for."

However, the reunion would not come to pass, as Rabin stated in 2020 that the group had split. Wakeman said one reason was him living in the UK and the other two in different parts of California, having to share ideas online. Earlier in 2020, Brian Lane was dismissed as manager but will still manage Wakeman's solo career.

In a 2023 interview with Innerviews, Rabin cast new light on the band's relatively short lifespan and why it had never released any recorded material, affectionately describing Yes as "a whale. When it’s in the water, it swims fantastically great, but as a producer, getting it in the ocean is a bloody pain in the ass. [laughs] I just couldn’t see myself doing that... The shows were very natural and enjoyable. It seemed like the audience was having fun. Once it came to an end, it wasn’t like a classic breakup or anything. It was more like, "Well, we did it, and it was fun."... In the end, I felt no band has the right to impose its problems and nonsense on the people who just want to hear the music... there have been a number of times where I thought the politics of Yes were too much. And to be honest, it's why I wouldn't consider doing Anderson, Rabin, Wakeman again."

== Legal rights to the name "Yes" ==
At the time of Squire's death, the band name "Yes" was co-owned by Anderson, Squire, Howe, and Yes drummer Alan White. During Squire's lifetime, he and Anderson had informally agreed that only Squire's group would use the name "Yes". In 2018, Anderson said that Squire's wife, Scotland, had suggested, in the wake of his death, that both groups could use the name.

== Band members ==
- Jon Anderson – lead and backing vocals, acoustic guitar, harp, percussion
- Trevor Rabin – guitars, backing and lead vocals
- Rick Wakeman – keyboards

Live musicians

- Lee Pomeroy – bass, pedals, backing vocals
- Lou Molino III – drums, percussion, backing vocals
- Iain Hornal – bass, backing vocals (2017 Japanese tour, 2018 European tour)

== Discography ==
Live albums

- Live at the Apollo (2018)

== Tours ==
- An Evening of Yes Music and More Tour (October 2016 – October 2017)
- Quintessential Yes: The 50th Anniversary Tour (June–September 2018)
