= Lou Molino III =

American drummer

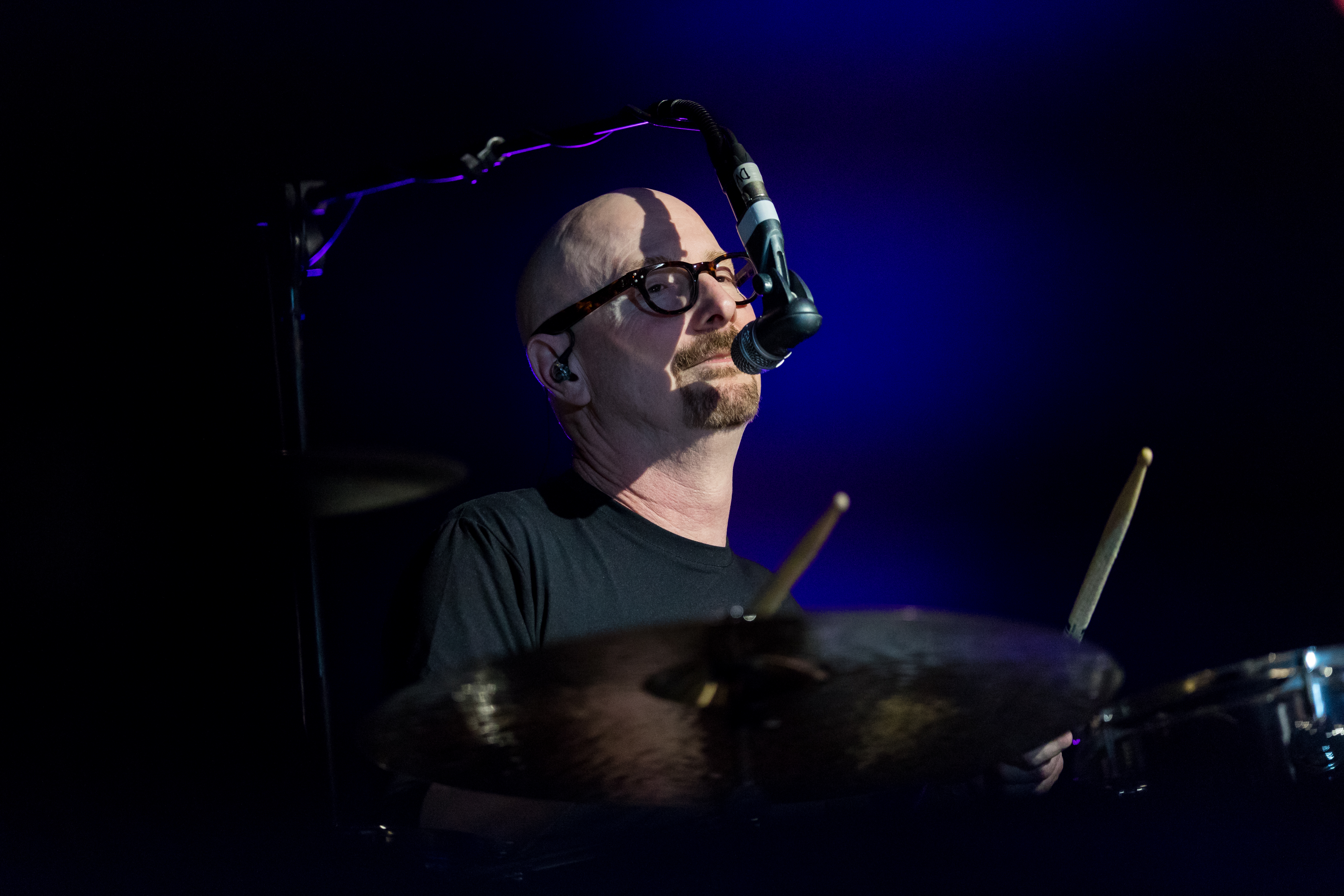
- Molino performing with ARW in 2018

Background information
- Born: Louis Molino III; Philadelphia, Pennsylvania, United States
- Genres: Rock
- Occupations: Musician
- Instruments: Drums; percussion; backing vocals
- Formerly of: Trevor Rabin Band; Cock Robin; Yoso; ARW

Louis Molino III is an American drummer, best known for many years working with Trevor Rabin. He was also a member of Cock Robin and Yoso with Bobby Kimball, Billy Sherwood, Tony Kaye and Jimmy Haun.

Born in Philadelphia, Lou Malino's first major band was Cock Robin, who released their debut album in 1985. He met and began working with Paul De Villiers and, through him, met and began working with Rabin, appearing with him live, on his solo albums Can't Look Away and Live in LA, and on his more recent soundtrack work.

Molino has also played with Julian Lennon (Help Yourself), Kenny Loggins and Kim Mitchell.

From 2016 to 2018, Molino toured with Yes Featuring Jon Anderson, Trevor Rabin, Rick Wakeman.
