= Trevor Rabin =

South African musician (born 1954)

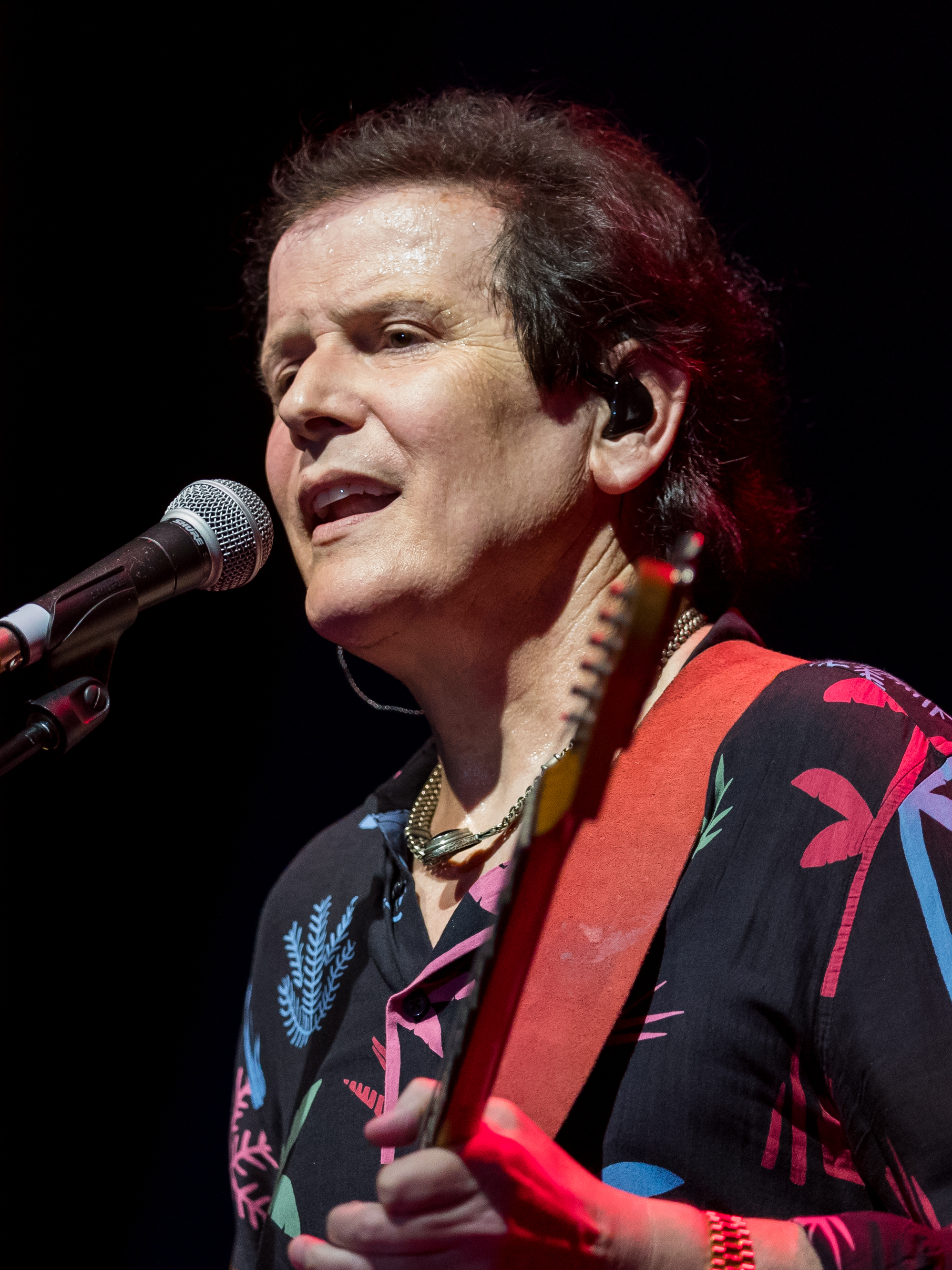
- Rabin performing with Yes featuring ARW in 2018

Background information
- Born: Trevor Charles Rabin; 13 January 1954 (age 72); Johannesburg, South Africa
- Genres: Progressive rock; hard rock; pop; jazz fusion; classical; film score
- Occupations: Musician; composer; producer
- Instruments: Guitar; vocals; piano; keyboards; bass guitar; percussion; banjo; autoharp
- Years active: 1972–present
- Labels: RPM; Chrysalis; Elektra; Voiceprint; Hollywood; Varèse Sarabande; Inside Out
- Formerly of: Rabbitt; Yes; Yes Featuring Jon Anderson, Trevor Rabin, Rick Wakeman
- Website: trevorrabin.net

Trevor Charles Rabin (/ˈreɪbɪn/ RAY-bin; born 13 January 1954) is a South African musician, songwriter and composer, known as a guitarist and singer in the pop rock band Rabbitt from 1972 to 1978, and the English progressive rock band Yes from 1983 to 1995, as well as for releasing solo albums and composing numerous film scores including Con Air, Armageddon, Deep Blue Sea, Remember the Titans and National Treasure. Rabin is also a multi-instrumentalist who plays piano, assorted keyboards, bass guitar, banjo and other instruments as well as being a seasoned producer, programmer and orchestral arranger, performing most of the instrumental parts on his own releases and recordings.

Born into a musical family and raised in Johannesburg, Rabin took up the piano and guitar at an early age and became a session musician, playing and producing with a variety of artists. In 1972, he formed and fronted Rabbitt, which became one of the most popular and influential bands in South Africa. In 1978, Rabin left Rabbitt and moved to London to further his career, working both as a solo artist and as a producer for various other artists including Manfred Mann's Earth Band. From 1977 to 1981, he released the solo albums Beginnings (1977), Face to Face (1979) and Wolf (1981).

After moving to Los Angeles in 1981, Rabin gained prominence in the reformed Yes with the album 90125 (1983). Developed mostly from his own demos, it remains their best-selling album, helped by the US number one single "Owner of a Lonely Heart"; it was followed by 1987's Big Generator. In 1989, during a lull in Yes activity, Rabin released his fourth solo album Can't Look Away. He was part of the expanded Yes band for its multi-line-up Union album of 1991 and played on the accompanying eight-man tour, until the band reverted to the 90125 line-up for 1994's Talk, which Rabin produced and predominantly wrote and performed.

Rabin left Yes in 1995 after the Talk tour and changed career to become a prolific film composer. He has since scored over forty feature films, most notably his frequent collaborations with producer Jerry Bruckheimer. He has won numerous awards, including eleven BMI Awards. Rabin is also behind the theme song for the NBA on TNT and MLB on TBS. He released another solo album, the almost all-instrumental Jacaranda, in 2012, and reunited with a version of Yes to tour as Yes Featuring Jon Anderson, Trevor Rabin, Rick Wakeman during 2016. In 2017, Rabin was inducted into the Rock and Roll Hall of Fame as a member of Yes. His sixth and latest solo album Rio was released in 2023.

== Early life ==
Rabin was born on 13 January 1954 in Johannesburg, South Africa, into a family of musicians. His mother, Joy, was a painter, ballet dancer, actress, and classical pianist, and his father, Godfrey, was a lawyer, musician, conductor, and the lead violinist in the Johannesburg Philharmonic Orchestra. The two met during their service in the South African army entertainment division. His paternal great-grandfather was a Lithuanian Jew who was a cantor, and his grandfather, Gershon Rabinowitz, was a kosher butcher who arrived in South Africa in the late nineteenth century. His uncle Morrie Rabin was a piano teacher. Rabin's brother Derek is three years his elder. Rabin described his family as "extremely anti-apartheid". Rabin's mother converted to Judaism, and the family observed Jewish holidays and celebrations. Lawyer and judge Sydney Kentridge, and journalist and activist Donald Woods are his uncles.

Rabin attended Parktown Boys' High School in Johannesburg and took up the piano at age six. He recalled, "Pushed by my parents, I had two lessons a week and practised an hour a day for twelve years, whether I liked it or not, as did my brother and sister." At twelve, he started to teach himself the guitar using piano exercise books and never had a formal lesson in the instrument. A year later he played in The Other before forming Conglomeration, and later joining Freedom's Children for a one-year stint until 1973. He wrote their song "State of Fear" and toured the country extensively with a same-titled tour. For several months Rabin studied arrangement, orchestration, and conducting from Walter Mony, a professor at the University of Johannesburg in preparation to be a conductor, but he decided to pursue a career in rock music.

At sixteen, Rabin was discovered by a local record producer and became a session musician, playing a variety of styles including jazz, fusion, country, classical, conga, and kwela. He cites Arnold Schoenberg, Tchaikovsky, Hank Marvin, Cliff Richard and the Shadows, The Beatles and Jimi Hendrix as early influences. At nineteen, Rabin took a mandatory year of military conscription in the South African Army by serving in its entertainment division, arranging its big band, performing in a rock group, and did outside session work at Gallo Record Company. He said, "I used to go into what was called the garrison. I would just go there, find a little corner and literally sit for hours practising the guitar ... although I would always play the piano." In 1972, Rabin bought a Fender Stratocaster.

== Career ==
=== 1972–1978: Rabbitt and solo projects ===
In 1972, Rabin reunited with his bandmates in Conglomeration to form the rock band Rabbitt with drummer Neil Cloud, bassist Ronnie Robot, and singer, keyboardist, and guitarist Duncan Faure. Their first single, released in 1972, was a cover of "Locomotive Breath" by Jethro Tull. A re-recorded version of the track appeared on their debut album, Boys Will Be Boys, released in 1975 on Jo'Burg Records. Rabin won an award for his orchestral arrangements on the album in 1975. The band won a SARI (South African Recording Industry) Award for Best Contemporary Music Artist in 1976.

Rabbitt's second album, A Croak and a Grunt in the Night, was released in 1977. Later that year Rabin received a SARI Award for his production work on the album and Rabbitt received their second award for Best Contemporary Music Artist. Rabin also produced and arranged Margaret Singana's album Where is the Love (1976). His career as a session musician included his two albums released under the pseudonym Trevor Terblanche, organised by producer Rob Schroder and released on a budget record label. Rabin also produced various disco-oriented projects including The Tee Cee's, Slang, and Disco Rock Machine.

In 1977, Rabin recorded and released his first solo album, Beginnings, for RPM Records. It was recorded in approximately six and a half weeks in Johannesburg. He recalled: "I don't think I ever left the studio at that time. I virtually lived and worked there around the clock". Rabin played all instruments except the drums, for which he used session player Kevin Kruger. Also in 1977 Rabbitt agreed to a distribution deal with the US label Capricorn Records, but they were unable to tour abroad due to the international disapproval of South Africa's apartheid policies and restrictions on South Africans obtaining visas. The situation became a catalyst for Rabin to leave both the country and the band. He had scored his first feature film by this time, the 1976 blaxploitation film Death of a Snowman (later rereleased as Soul Patrol). Rabin recalled: "We stuck a sheet up on the wall and I wrote the score ... I still haven't watched it".

=== 1978–1982: London and Los Angeles ===
In January 1978, Rabin arrived in London to continue his solo career. He was encouraged to move by music entrepreneur Ivor Schlosberg, who hired Rabin to kick start the English branch of his production company, Blue Chip Music, and become its first producer. By July, Rabin had struck a recording deal with Chrysalis Records which, in September 1978, reissued his debut solo album under the name Trevor Rabin. The album was remixed at Wessex Sound Studios in London and released with some new tracks and in a different track order. Billboard magazine gave a positive review: "An impressive outing marked by a rock style that invites comparisons to Boston at times or a Tom Petty" with "explosive" keyboards and guitars. Later in 1978, Rabin produced, performed on, and arranged Noel McCalla's debut album, Night Time Emotion (1979).

In 1979, Rabin released his second solo album, Face to Face. He promoted the album with a UK tour as an opening act for guitarist Steve Hillage. Rolling Stone criticised the record for its hook-ridden ballads but still gave his first two albums good ratings for their technical qualities. In the same year, he co-produced Wild Horses, the debut album by Wild Horses. In 1980, Rabin played the guitar and co-produced Chance by Manfred Mann's Earth Band with Manfred Mann.

Wolf, Rabin's third solo album for Chrysalis, released in 1980, was co-produced with Ray Davies. Recorded at Konk Studios in London, Rabin provided lead vocals, guitars, and keyboards while using various musicians to contribute, including drummer Simon Phillips, bassists Jack Bruce and Mo Foster, keyboardists Mann and John Bundrick, and Chris Thompson and Noel McCalla on additional vocals. Following its release, Rabin severed ties with Chrysalis as he felt the label did little to promote the album. During this time, Rabin played guitars on "Runner" and a rendition of "Redemption Song" by Bob Marley for Manfred Mann's Earth Band's album Somewhere in Afrika (1982).

In 1981, Rabin moved to Los Angeles upon the encouragement from Geffen Records A&R man John Kalodner, and began to develop material for a fourth solo album for the label with drummer Frankie Banali and bassist Mark Andes. During this time, David Geffen also put him in contact with musicians that went on to form the supergroup Asia. Rabin attended an early rehearsal, but felt his songs were not suitable for the group which led to the label dropping him. Another proposed rock supergroup with Rabin, singer and bassist John Wetton, drummer Carl Palmer, and keyboardist Rick Wakeman never came to fruition.

Rabin then sent a tape of his new songs to various labels, including Clive Davis at Arista Records who praised his vocals but deemed his songs unsuitable for the Top 40 format. RCA Records executive Ron Fair was, according to Rabin, "the first one to really hear that I had something interesting", and talks began regarding a new group of Rabin, Bruce, and keyboardist Keith Emerson. The group fell through, yet Fair offered Rabin a solo deal which was declined after Rabin decided to work with bassist Chris Squire and drummer Alan White, formerly of the progressive rock band Yes after his demos were discovered by producer Mutt Lange and Phil Carson of Atlantic Records.

=== 1982–1995: Yes and Can't Look Away ===
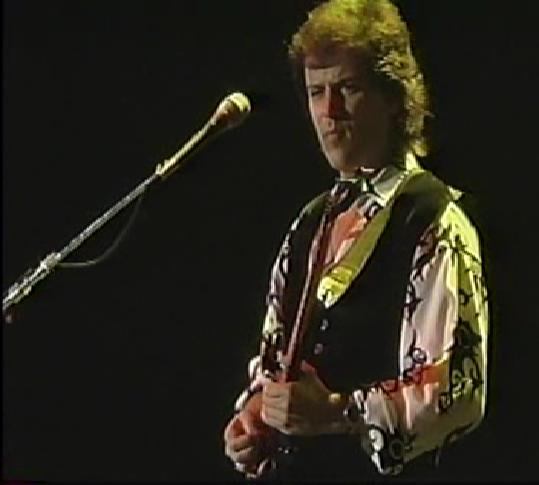
Rabin in 1994

In late 1982, Rabin, Squire and White formed Cinema which included original Yes keyboardist Tony Kaye, and recorded 90125 with former Yes singer Trevor Horn as producer. Based mostly on Rabin's demos, the album displayed a more commercial direction, much different than their progressive rock-themed albums in the 1970s. During the mixing stages in mid-1983, former Yes singer Jon Anderson returned to sing on the album which led to the group becoming a reformed line-up of Yes. Rabin was uncomfortable with the decision, feeling the new music did not represent what the band became popular for and wished for the album to be judged as its own.

Released in 1983, 90125 remains the band's highest selling album with three million copies sold in the US alone, helped by its lead single "Owner of a Lonely Heart", one of Rabin's songs, which reached No. 1 on the Billboard Hot 100 singles and Hot Mainstream Rock Tracks charts. When it reached number one, Rabin sent a letter to Davis and wrote, "I guess you were wrong". Yes toured the album in 1984 and 1985, performing over 100 concerts worldwide which included two headline spots at the inaugural Rock in Rio festival. The tour was delayed to start after a woman hit Rabin's midsection when she jumped into a swimming pool. This collision ruptured the Yes guitarist's spleen and required emergency surgery. Rabin is featured on the concert film 9012Live, released in cinemas to coincide with the live LP 9012Live: The Solos. The latter features Rabin's acoustic guitar solo, "Solly's Beard".

Big Generator was a laborious album to make. It was released in September 1987, with singles "Love Will Find a Way" and "Rhythm of Love". Both were modest chart hits compared to the singles from 90125, though the album was certified Platinum. The song "Shoot High Aim Low" featured a dual lead vocal between Rabin and Anderson. The 1987–88 Big Generator tour featured the hits, but other album tracks, such as "Final Eyes" and "I'm Running," were dropped because as Rabin later said, they never quite happened live. Several tour dates were cancelled after Rabin suffered from the flu. The tour ended on 14 May 1988 with a performance at Madison Square Garden as part of the Atlantic Records 40th Anniversary concert. During the album's production Rabin was asked by Bob Dylan to play the guitar on two songs.

Later in 1988, Anderson left Yes to form Anderson Bruford Wakeman Howe (ABWH) and the band entered a period of inactivity. Rabin used the time to make his fourth solo album, Can't Look Away. Released in July 1989 by Elektra Records, the album peaked at No. 111 on the Billboard 200. Its lead single, "Something to Hold on To", peaked at No. 3 on the Billboard Mainstream Rock chart and received a Grammy Award nomination for Best Short Form Music Video. In 1989 and 1990, Rabin completed a solo tour of the US with drummer Lou Molino III, bassist Jim Simmons, and keyboardist Mark Mancina. Recordings from the tour were used on the live album Live in LA released in 2003, featuring songs from Wolf, 90125, and Big Generator. In addition to his solo work, Rabin worked on new music with Supertramp singer Roger Hodgson who was asked to replace Anderson as Yes's singer.

From 1990 to 1992, Rabin was a part of an eight-member formation of Yes. Anderson had asked him to submit a song that he would allow ABWH to record on their second album; Rabin said "What I read into that was they needed a single", and sent three demos. Despite requesting only one be used, Anderson wished to use all three which prompted discussions among the two group's management over the idea of Yes and ABWH working on a single album, Union. Rabin thought a merge "was useful and convenient to everyone" as it was a quick way to get the band back on the road touring, and completed "Lift Me Up", "Miracle of Life", and "Saving My Heart". The tour featured the eight members playing on stage; though it did little to improve relations between Howe and himself, Rabin began a good relationship with Rick Wakeman.

Rabin's final album with Yes was Talk, released in 1994. Carson had approached him to make an album with the 90125 line-up for his independent label, Victory Music. Knowing the importance of having a close collaboration with Anderson, the two wrote the album at a motel in San Clemente, California. The group chose Rabin to oversee its production, the recording for which occurred at Rabin's home studio and A&M Recording Studios using digital non-linear recording and editing with Digital Performer over traditional tape. "The Calling" and "Walls" were released as singles that charted at No. 3 and No. 24 on the Hot Mainstream Rock chart, respectively. After touring the US, South America, and Japan through 1995, Rabin left the band in the following year to work in film.

=== 1995–2012: Film composer ===
In 1995, Rabin scored additional music to the film Fair Game. He then produced a complete score for The Glimmer Man (1996), directed by John Gray for Warner Bros. starring Steven Seagal. Rabin landed the job after Seagal asked him for guitar lessons. Rabin said: "I went to his house and afterwards he said 'Thank you so much, I really appreciate it. If there's anything I can do for you...' and I said to him 'You know, I really want to get into film scoring'." Rabin then accepted Seagal's offer to score the film. Rabin went on to form a longtime partnership with Jerry Bruckheimer after he worked on the soundtrack to Con Air with Mancina. Rabin has scored 13 films by Bruckheimer. Rabin has twice scored for silent films as a way of practising his composition and orchestration skills, first on the piano and transcribing the music for orchestra.

In 1997, Rabin performed "I Can't Look Away" at a Prince's Trust concert for Nelson Mandela in Johannesburg. Rabin called his meeting with Mandela and his family as "an immensely proud moment" of his life. In June 1999, he was one of several guest rock musicians performing with the Hollywood Bowl Orchestra conducted by George Martin at a charity fund-raising concert. In the early 2000s, Rabin declined an offer to join Foreigner as keyboardist due to contractual obligations with film scoring. In 2003, Rabin released several of his demo tracks, of which some were recorded by Yes on 90125, as 90124. Later that year, he released Live in LA, a live album recorded in 1989 on his Can't Look Away tour. In 2004, Rabin joined former and current members of Yes to perform "Cinema" and "Owner of a Lonely Heart" at a tribute concert for producer Trevor Horn at Wembley Arena in London, in aid of the Prince's Trust. On 9 July 2010, Rabin performed with Yes at their show in Los Angeles for "Owner of a Lonely Heart", the show's encore.

Rabin's score for Glory Road features vocals from Alicia Keys. His composition "Titans Spirit" from Remember the Titans (2000) has been used for NBC's coverage of the summer and winter Olympic Games and Barack Obama's speech and celebration upon winning the 2008 US presidential election. Rabin composed the theme for Turner Broadcasting System's NBA on TNT in 2002, MLB on TBS in 2007, and March Madness in 2011, and Disney's Mission: Space attraction at Epcot. In 1995, Rabin produced a set of system software alert sounds for the Apple Power Macintosh computer.

=== 2012–present: Return to solo and band work ===
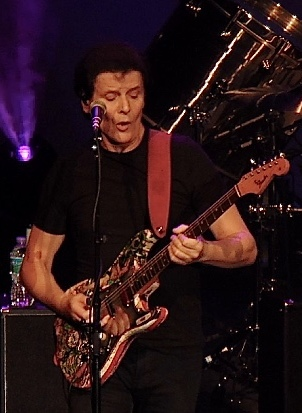
Rabin performing in 2017

Rabin's fifth solo album and his first in 23 years, Jacaranda, was released on 8 May 2012 on Varèse Sarabande. The album came about in 2007 when Rabin began, without any direction from a record company, write "music that I enjoy ... that will be challenging for me to play". He opted for an instrumental album as one with vocals did not interest him at the time. Recording the album took time as it was completed during breaks from working on film scores. In 2011, Rabin turned down various scoring projects to complete the album. Rabin plays all of the instruments himself with the exception of drums, for which he used Vinnie Colaiuta, Lou Molino III, and his son Ryan. Tal Wilkenfeld plays bass on "Anerley Road" and Liz Constantine provides vocals on "Rescue", a track Rabin originally recorded for The Guardian (2006).

In 2016, Rabin took a break from film scoring to co-form a self-described new version of Yes with Jon Anderson and Rick Wakeman. He had toured worldwide with the group from October 2016 to 2018. A studio album was in development, but it was scrapped partly due to the inconvenience of the three having to share ideas online as Wakeman lived in England and Anderson and Rabin in different parts of California.

In 2020, a 10-CD career-spanning box set of Rabin's solo material, Yes outtakes, and soundtracks was released entitled Changes. Rabin performed at the Alan White tribute concert on 2 October 2022.

In December 2022, Rabin announced that his sixth studio album Rio was complete. The album took several years to make; in 2017 Rabin said he was roughly halfway through recording and in 2020, said he was working hard on the album. The album is Rabin's first album featuring lead vocals since Can't Look Away. "Big Mistakes" was released as a digital single on 4 August, followed by "Push" on 5 September, and "Oklahoma" on 29 September. The album was released on 6 October 2023 by Inside Out Music and Sony.

== Personal life ==
Rabin has been married to his wife Shelley May since 1978. The pair first met when they were at school. They have resided in Hollywood, Los Angeles since 1984 and have one son, Ryan. Ryan is a drummer and record producer, and a former member of The Anthem, The Outline, and from 2009 to 2017, the alternative rock band Grouplove.

In 1987, Rabin said of his time in South Africa: "I can't remember the feeling of living there anymore. It's like it was in another life. That's sad in a way. It is my country ... I don't live there but carry South Africa with me." He said that Yes were offered to perform in Sun City, but Rabin refused as it was indirectly sanctioning the country's apartheid system. In 1991, Rabin became a naturalised US citizen. He is a godfather to former Yes drummer Alan White's son Jesse.

== Awards ==
Rabin has received eleven Broadcast Music Incorporated film score awards and a Lifetime Achievement Award from the Temecula Valley International Film Festival.

In June 2011, Rabin received an award at the 26th ASCAP Film and Television Music Awards in the Top Box Office Films category for The Sorcerer's Apprentice (2010). On 28 June 2012, Rabin received a Henry Mancini Award at the 27th ASCAP Film & Television Music Awards. Rabin also performed "Owner of a Lonely Heart" with his son's band Grouplove.

In 2017, while still a member of ARW, Trevor Rabin was inducted into the Rock and Roll Hall of Fame along with fellow members of Yes. He performed on "Owner of a Lonely Heart" and 'Roundabout," the latter which featured Geddy Lee of Rush on bass guitar.

== Influences ==
Rabin named Bernard Herrmann as his favourite score composer. He has named Arnold Schoenberg as one of his favourite classical composers, and him and other classical composers – Beethoven, Ravel, Elgar and Tchaikovsky – as influences. Rabin has also cited "Building the Barn" by Maurice Jarre from his score to Witness (1985) as a piece of particular influence on him.

== Discography ==
=== As solo artist ===
- Beginnings (1977) (reissued in 1978 as Trevor Rabin)
- Face to Face (1979)
- Wolf (1981)
- Can't Look Away (1989)
- Live in LA (2003, live)
- 90124 (2003, archival compilation)
- Jacaranda (2012)
- Rio (2023)

=== As band member ===
Rabbitt

- Boys Will Be Boys! (1975)
- A Croak and a Grunt in the Night (1977)
- Morning Light (1977, maxi single)
- 1972–1978: Limited Souvenir Edition (1978, EP)

Yes

- 90125 (1983)
- Big Generator (1987)
- Union (1991)
- Talk (1994)
- 9012Live: The Solos (1985, live)
- Union Live (2011, live)

Yes Featuring Jon Anderson, Trevor Rabin, Rick Wakeman

- Live at the Apollo (2018, live)

=== Film scores ===
- Death of a Snowman (1976)
- Fair Game (1995, additional music only)
- The Glimmer Man (1996)
- Con Air (1997, with Mark Mancina)
- Homegrown (1998)
- Armageddon (1998)
- Enemy of the State (1998, with Harry Gregson-Williams)
- Jack Frost (1998)
- Deep Blue Sea (1999)
- Whispers: An Elephant's Tale (2000)
- Gone in 60 Seconds (2000)
- Remember the Titans (2000)
- The 6th Day (2000)
- American Outlaws (2001)
- Rock Star (2001)
- The One (2001)
- Texas Rangers (2001)
- Bad Company (2002)
- The Banger Sisters (2003)
- Kangaroo Jack (2003)
- Bad Boys II (2003)
- Torque (2004)
- Exorcist: The Beginning (2004)
- National Treasure (2004)
- Coach Carter (2005)
- Dominion: Prequel to the Exorcist (2005)
- The Great Raid (2005)
- Glory Road (2006)
- Snakes on a Plane (2006)
- Gridiron Gang (2006)
- Flyboys (2006)
- The Guardian (2006)
- Hot Rod (2007)
- National Treasure: Book of Secrets (2007)
- Get Smart (2008)
- 12 Rounds (2009)
- Race to Witch Mountain (2009)
- G-Force (2009)
- The Sorcerer's Apprentice (2010)
- I Am Number Four (2011)
- 5 Days of War (2011)
- The Movement: One Man Joins an Uprising (2011)
- Grudge Match (2013)
- Max (2015)
- The Misfits (2021, with Lasse Enersen)

=== Television scores ===
- Zero Hour (2013, with Paul Linford)
- 12 Monkeys (2015–2016, with Paul Linford)
- Agent X (2015, with Paul Linford)
- Cine Chalom (2020, with Paul Linford)
- Digman! (2023)
- National Treasure: Edge of History (2022–2023, with Paul Linford)

=== Guest appearances and collaborations ===
- Margaret Singana – Where Is the Love (1976) – Producer, arranger
- Manfred Mann's Earth Band – Chance (1980) – Producer
- Wild Horses – Wild Horses (1980) – Co-Producer
- Manfred Mann's Earth Band – Somewhere in Afrika (1982) – Lead guitar on "Redemption Song", guitar solo on "Runner"
- Frankie Goes To Hollywood – Welcome to the Pleasuredome (1984) – backing vocals and bass guitar
- Jon Anderson – 3 Ships (1985) – Guitar
- Frankie Goes To Hollywood – Liverpool (1986) – Guitar
- Lisa Hartman – 'Til My Heart Stops (1987) – Guitar
- Marc Jordan – Talking Through Pictures (1987) – Guitar
- Bonham – The Disregard of Timekeeping (1989) – bass on "Bringing Me Down", "Holding on Forever" and "Don't Walk Away", backing vocals
- Seal – Seal (1991) – Guitar
- Paul Rodgers – Muddy Water Blues: A Tribute to Muddy Waters (1993) – Guitar
- Michael Jackson – HIStory: Past, Present and Future, Book I (1995) – Guitar
- Various Artists – Crossfire: A Salute To Stevie Ray Vaughan (1996) – Guitar
- Tina Turner – Wildest Dreams (1996) – Guitar, Background Vocals
- Mark Mancina – Twister (1996) – Guitar on "The Hunt: Going Green"
- Various Artists – Merry Axemas Vol. 2 (1998) – Guitar, Keyboards
- Rick Wakeman – Return to the Centre of the Earth (1999) – Vocals, Guitar on "Never Is A Long, Long Time"
- Roger Hodgson – Open The Door (2000) – Guitar, Keyboards & Backing Vocals on "The More I Look"
- Don Harper's Oceana Orchestra – Dream and Variations (2009) – Guitar on "Where Do We Go From Here"
- Mr. Mister – Pull (2010) – Guitar, Bass
- Jason Becker – Triumphant Hearts (2018) – "River of Longing"
- Carly Rae Jepsen - The Loneliest Time (2022) – Guitar on "Talking to Yourself"
- Joe Bonamassa - Live at the Hollywood Bowl with Orchestra (2024) - Arranger on "Prisoner" and "The Ballad Of John Henry"
