= The Royal Affair Tour: Live from Las Vegas =

Live album by Yes
- Released: 30 October 2020
- Recorded: 26 July 2019
- Venue: The Joint (Las Vegas, NV)
- Genre: Progressive rock
- Length: 75:15
- Label: BMG
- Producer: Yes

Yes chronology
From a Page (2019)	The Royal Affair Tour: Live from Las Vegas (2020)	The Quest (2021)

The Royal Affair Tour: Live from Las Vegas is a live album by progressive rock band Yes, released on 30 October 2020 by BMG. It documents the group's performance on 26 July 2019 at The Joint in Las Vegas, Nevada, during their Royal Affair Tour.

== Background ==
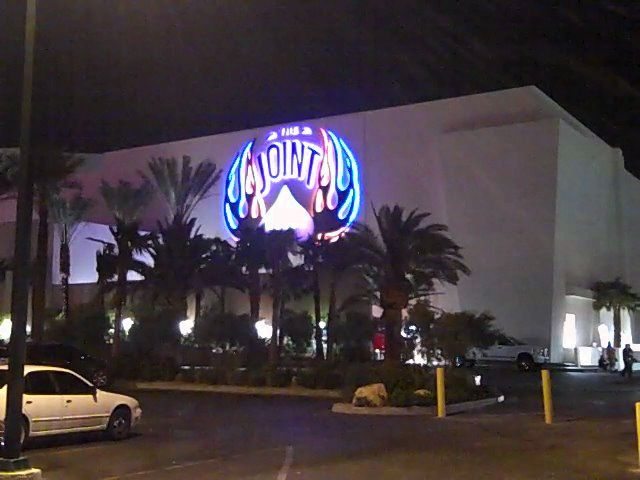
The Joint pictured in 2009

The record album was recorded on 26 July 2019 at The Joint in Las Vegas, Nevada, during Yes' Royal Affair Tour. Two songs from the concert do not appear on the album: "Country Mix" (an acoustic guitar solo by Steve Howe) and "The Gates of Delirium".

== Track listing ==
No.	Title	Writer(s)	Length
1.	"No Opportunity Necessary, No Experience Needed"	Richie Havens	4:56
2.	"Tempus Fugit"	Geoff Downes, Trevor Horn, Steve Howe, Chris Squire, Alan White	6:09
3.	"Going for the One"	Jon Anderson	5:28
4.	"I've Seen All Good People": a. "Your Move"; b. "All Good People"	Anderson, Chris Squire	7:11
5.	"Siberian Khatru"	Anderson, Howe, Rick Wakeman	10:27
6.	"Onward"	Squire	4:04
7.	"America", including "Southern Solo"	Paul Simon ("Southern Solo" by Howe)	11:10
8.	"Imagine"	John Lennon, Yoko Ono	4:53
9.	"Roundabout"	Anderson, Howe	9:15
10.	"Starship Trooper": a. "Life Seeker"; b. "Disillusion"; c. "Würm"	Anderson, Howe, Squire	11:42

== Personnel ==
Yes

- Steve Howe – guitars, backing vocals
- Alan White – drums, percussion
- Billy Sherwood – bass guitar, backing vocals, harmonica, mixing
- Geoff Downes – keyboards
- Jon Davison – lead vocals, acoustic guitar, percussion

with

- Jay Schellen – additional drums, percussion
- John Lodge - guest vocals on "Imagine"

Production

- Maor Appelbaum – Mastering Engineer
- Roger Dean – artwork

== Charts ==
Chart (2020)	Peak position
Scottish Albums (OCC)	61
UK Independent Albums (OCC)	17
UK Rock & Metal Albums (OCC)	6
