= Like It Is: Yes at the Mesa Arts Center =

Live album by Yes
- Released: 3 July 2015 (Europe); 10 July 2015 (North America)
- Recorded: 12 August 2014
- Venue: Mesa Arts Center, Mesa, Arizona, U.S.
- Genre: Progressive rock
- Length: 1:20:39
- Label: Frontiers Records
- Producer: Yes

Yes chronology
Progeny: Seven Shows from Seventy-Two (2015)	Like It Is: Yes at the Mesa Arts Center (2015)	Topographic Drama – Live Across America (2017)

Yes video chronology
Like It Is: Yes at the Bristol Hippodrome (2014)	Like It Is: Yes at the Mesa Arts Center (2015)

Like It Is: Yes at the Mesa Arts Center is a live album and video from the English progressive rock band Yes, released on CD and DVD, LP, and Blu-ray on 3 July 2015 in Europe and on 10 July 2015 in North America on Frontiers Records. It is a partial recording of the band's concert on 12 August 2014 at the Mesa Arts Center in Mesa, Arizona as a part of their 2014–15 Heaven & Earth Tour.

This was the final live recording to feature bassist (and last original member) Chris Squire, who died shortly before its release.

== Background ==
Like It Is: Yes at the Mesa Arts Center is a sequel to Like It Is: Yes at the Bristol Hippodrome, which featured the albums Going for the One and The Yes Album performed in their entirety, in track order. Likewise, Yes at the Mesa Arts Center features complete performances of the albums Close to the Edge and Fragile. Two songs "Believe Again" and "The Game" from the band's most recent studio album Heaven & Earth were performed, along with an encore of "I've Seen All Good People" and "Owner of a Lonely Heart," but have been excluded so that the complete Like It Is set contains just the two albums.

It is of note that the Close to the Edge album was usually played in reverse order during the tour, but for this release it was changed to the original order.

== Track listing ==
Disc one
No.	Title	Writer(s)	Length
1.	"Close to the Edge": I. "The Solid Time of Change"; II. "Total Mass Retain"; III. "I Get Up, I Get Down"; IV. "Seasons of Man"	Jon Anderson, Steve Howe	19:11
2.	"And You and I": I. "Cord of Life"; II. "Eclipse"; III. "The Preacher, the Teacher"; IV. "Apocalypse"	Anderson; themes by Bill Bruford, Howe, Chris Squire	10:58
3.	"Siberian Khatru"	Anderson, Howe, Rick Wakeman	9:52

Disc two
No.	Title	Writer(s)	Length
1.	"Roundabout"	Anderson, Howe	8:34
2.	"Cans and Brahms"	Johannes Brahms, arranged by Wakeman	1:41
3.	"We Have Heaven"	Anderson	1:31
4.	"South Side of the Sky"	Anderson, Squire	9:35
5.	"Five Per Cent for Nothing"	Bruford	0:42
6.	"Long Distance Runaround"	Anderson	3:36
7.	"The Fish (Schindleria Praematurus)"	Squire	3:15
8.	"Mood for a Day"	Howe	3:03
9.	"Heart of the Sunrise"	Anderson, Squire, Bruford	11:41
10.	"Owner Of A Lonely Heart (bonus track on Japanese CD version)"	Rabin, Anderson, Squire, Horn

== Personnel ==
Yes

- Jon Davison – lead vocals, acoustic guitar, percussion, keyboard
- Steve Howe – electric and acoustic guitars, steel guitars, backing vocals
- Chris Squire – bass guitar, backing vocals, harmonica on "And You and I"
- Geoff Downes – keyboards
- Alan White – drums

Production

- Billy Sherwood - Mixing Engineer
- Maor Appelbaum - Mastering Engineer

== Charts ==
Chart (2015)	Peak position
Belgian Albums (Ultratop Flanders)	180
Belgian Albums (Ultratop Wallonia)	107
Dutch Albums (Album Top 100)	83
German Albums (Offizielle Top 100)	96
UK Rock & Metal Albums (OCC)	21
