= Progeny: Seven Shows from Seventy-Two =

Box set by Yes
- Released: 25 May 2015
- Recorded: 31 October – 20 November 1972
- Genre: Progressive rock
- Length: 11:31:32
- Label: Rhino
- Producers: Brian Kehew, Steve Woolard

Yes chronology
Like It Is: Yes at the Bristol Hippodrome (2014)	Progeny: Seven Shows from Seventy-Two (2015)	Like It Is: Yes at the Mesa Arts Center (2015)

Progeny: Seven Shows from Seventy-Two is a 14-CD live album box set from the English progressive rock band Yes, released on 25 May 2015 on Rhino Records. The album consists of seven complete shows recorded in 1972 during the band's Close to the Edge tour. A 2-CD/3-LP set of highlight performances from the seven shows was released as Progeny: Highlights from Seventy-Two. Every show includes the same setlist.

== Production ==
Yes completed their Close to the Edge tour from July 1972 to April 1973 to support their fifth studio album, Close to the Edge (1972). The tour visited North America three times, the UK twice, and Japan and Australia for the first time. A selection of shows from 1972 from the Close to the Edge and the previous Fragile tours were recorded which formed much of the material on their first live album, Yessongs (1973).

Work on Progeny: Seven Shows from Seventy-Two began following the discovery of several multi-track reel-to-reel audio tapes containing seven full shows from the Close to the Edge tour, some being the source recordings of parts of Yessongs. They were found during the search for bonus material to include on the remastered reissues of the band's back catalogue. The original recordings were flawed in parts due to various recording mishaps, but were remixed using modern technology to attempt to compensate, particularly for the lack of bass guitar. The mastering engineers also took care to avoid the loudness war practices common to modern recordings. A lengthy essay detailing the remixing practices used during the preparation of the set is included in the packaging, and while the audio quality has received praise from some, others note the low level of Chris Squire's bass guitar, despite the attempts to boost it.

The seven shows were recorded during the second North American leg of the Close to the Edge tour. They are:

Date	City	Country	Venue
31 October 1972	Toronto, Ontario	Canada	Maple Leaf Gardens
1 November 1972	Ottawa, Ontario	Canada	Ottawa Civic Centre
11 November 1972	Durham, North Carolina	United States	Duke University
12 November 1972	Greensboro, North Carolina	United States	Greensboro Coliseum
14 November 1972	Athens, Georgia ^{[a]}	United States	University of Georgia
15 November 1972	Knoxville, Tennessee ^{[b]}	United States	Knoxville Civic Coliseum
20 November 1972	Uniondale, New York	United States	Nassau Veterans Memorial Coliseum

== Sleeve design ==
The album features new art work designed and illustrated by Roger Dean.

== Critical reception ==
Professional ratings
Review scores
Source	Rating
AllMusic	4.5/5 stars
PopMatters	7/10

In a positive review for AllMusic, Thom Jurek rated Progeny: Seven Shows from Seventy-Two four-and-a-half stars out of five. John Garratt of PopMatters rated Progeny 7-out-of-10 and said that "the casual Yes fan cannot go into either package expecting something that sounds like Yessongs" and that Progeny has a great supply of "the raw element".

== Track listing ==
Note that four discs are inaccurately labelled:

a Discs nine & ten are mislabeled as "14 November 1972 – Athens, Georgia" while actually it is the 15 November 1972 Knoxville, Tennessee show.

b Discs eleven & twelve are mislabeled as "15 November 1972 – Knoxville, Tennessee" while actually it is the 14 November 1972 Athens, Georgia show.

Replacements are available from Rhino Records.

=== Seven Shows from Seventy-Two ===
==== 31 October 1972 – Toronto, Ontario ====
Disc one
No.	Title	Writer(s)	Length
1.	"Opening (Excerpt from Firebird Suite)~Siberian Khatru"	Igor Stravinsky~Jon Anderson, Steve Howe, Rick Wakeman	10:46
2.	"I've Seen All Good People": a. "Your Move"; b. "All Good People"	Anderson, Chris Squire	8:21
3.	"Mood for a Day/Clap"	Howe	6:46
4.	"Heart of the Sunrise"	Anderson, Bill Bruford, Squire	11:15
5.	"And You and I": I. "Cord of Life"; II. "Eclipse"; III. "The Preacher, the Teacher"; IV. "Apocalypse"	Anderson; themes by Bruford, Howe, Squire	9:42

Disc two
No.	Title	Writer(s)	Length
1.	"Close to the Edge": I. "The Solid Time of Change"; II. "Total Mass Retain"; III. "I Get Up, I Get Down"; IV. "Seasons of Man"	Anderson, Howe, Squire	18:24
2.	"Excerpts from The Six Wives of Henry VIII"	Wakeman	6:54
3.	"Roundabout"	Anderson, Howe	8:40
4.	"Yours Is No Disgrace"	Anderson, Squire, Howe, Bruford, Tony Kaye	14:33

==== 1 November 1972 – Ottawa, Ontario ====
Disc three
No.	Title	Writer(s)	Length
1.	"Opening (Excerpt from Firebird Suite)~Siberian Khatru"	Stravinsky~Anderson, Howe, Wakeman	10:21
2.	"I've Seen All Good People": a. "Your Move"; b. "All Good People"	Anderson, Squire	7:53
3.	"Heart of the Sunrise"	Anderson, Bruford, Squire	11:31
4.	"Mood for a Day/Clap"	Howe	7:14
5.	"And You and I": I. "Cord of Life"; II. "Eclipse"; III. "The Preacher, the Teacher"; IV. "Apocalypse"	Anderson; themes by Bruford, Howe, Squire	9:32

Disc four
No.	Title	Writer(s)	Length
1.	"Close to the Edge": I. "The Solid Time of Change"; II. "Total Mass Retain"; III. "I Get Up, I Get Down"; IV. "Seasons of Man"	Anderson, Howe, Squire	21:52
2.	"Excerpts from The Six Wives of Henry VIII"	Wakeman	5:36
3.	"Roundabout"	Anderson, Howe	8:46
4.	"Yours Is No Disgrace"	Anderson, Squire, Howe, Bruford, Kaye	14:25

==== 11 November 1972 – Durham, North Carolina ====
Disc five
No.	Title	Writer(s)	Length
1.	"Opening (Excerpt from Firebird Suite)~Siberian Khatru"	Stravinsky~Anderson, Howe, Wakeman	11:58
2.	"I've Seen All Good People": a. "Your Move"; b. "All Good People"	Anderson, Squire	7:34
3.	"Heart of the Sunrise"	Anderson, Bruford, Squire	11:26
4.	"Clap/Mood for a Day"	Howe	7:03
5.	"And You and I": I. "Cord of Life"; II. "Eclipse"; III. "The Preacher, the Teacher"; IV. "Apocalypse"	Anderson; themes by Bruford, Howe, Squire	11:00

Disc six
No.	Title	Writer(s)	Length
1.	"Close to the Edge": I. "The Solid Time of Change"; II. "Total Mass Retain"; III. "I Get Up, I Get Down"; IV. "Seasons of Man"	Anderson, Howe, Squire	19:30
2.	"Excerpts from The Six Wives of Henry VIII"	Wakeman	7:20
3.	"Roundabout"	Anderson, Howe	8:47
4.	"Yours Is No Disgrace"	Anderson, Squire, Howe, Bruford, Kaye	16:00

==== 12 November 1972 – Greensboro, North Carolina ====
Disc seven
No.	Title	Writer(s)	Length
1.	"Opening (Excerpt from Firebird Suite)~Siberian Khatru"	Stravinsky~Anderson, Howe, Wakeman	12:11
2.	"I've Seen All Good People": a. "Your Move"; b. "All Good People"	Anderson, Squire	7:38
3.	"Heart of the Sunrise"	Anderson, Bruford, Squire	11:40
4.	"Clap/Mood for a Day"	Howe	6:36
5.	"And You and I": I. "Cord of Life"; II. "Eclipse"; III. "The Preacher, the Teacher"; IV. "Apocalypse"	Anderson; themes by Bruford, Howe, Squire	11:06

Disc eight
No.	Title	Writer(s)	Length
1.	"Close to the Edge": I. "The Solid Time of Change"; II. "Total Mass Retain"; III. "I Get Up, I Get Down"; IV. "Seasons of Man"	Anderson, Howe, Squire	19:47
2.	"Excerpts from The Six Wives of Henry VIII"	Wakeman	7:11
3.	"Roundabout"	Anderson, Howe	8:36
4.	"Yours Is No Disgrace"	Anderson, Squire, Howe, Bruford, Kaye	16:22

==== 14 November 1972 – Athens, Georgia ^{[a]} ====
Disc nine
No.	Title	Writer(s)	Length
1.	"Opening (Excerpt from Firebird Suite)~Siberian Khatru"	Stravinsky~Anderson, Howe, Wakeman	9:53
2.	"I've Seen All Good People": a. "Your Move"; b. "All Good People"	Anderson, Squire	7:21
3.	"Heart of the Sunrise"	Anderson, Bruford, Squire	12:03
4.	"Mood for a Day/Clap"	Howe	7:13
5.	"And You and I": I. "Cord of Life"; II. "Eclipse"; III. "The Preacher, the Teacher"; IV. "Apocalypse"	Anderson; themes by Bruford, Howe, Squire	11:07

Disc ten
No.	Title	Writer(s)	Length
1.	"Close to the Edge": I. "The Solid Time of Change"; II. "Total Mass Retain"; III. "I Get Up, I Get Down"; IV. "Seasons of Man"	Anderson, Howe, Squire	19:52
2.	"Excerpts from The Six Wives of Henry VIII"	Wakeman	6:14
3.	"Roundabout"	Anderson, Howe	8:41
4.	"Yours Is No Disgrace"	Anderson, Squire, Howe, Bruford, Kaye	16:47

==== 15 November 1972 – Knoxville, Tennessee ^{[b]} ====
Disc eleven
No.	Title	Writer(s)	Length
1.	"Opening (Excerpt from Firebird Suite)~Siberian Khatru"	Stravinsky~Anderson, Howe, Wakeman	9:48
2.	"I've Seen All Good People": a. "Your Move"; b. "All Good People"	Anderson, Squire	7:37
3.	"Heart of the Sunrise"	Anderson, Bruford, Squire	11:33
4.	"Clap/Mood for a Day"	Howe	7:17
5.	"And You and I": I. "Cord of Life"; II. "Eclipse"; III. "The Preacher, the Teacher"; IV. "Apocalypse"	Anderson; themes by Bruford, Howe, Squire	9:45

Disc twelve
No.	Title	Writer(s)	Length
1.	"Close to the Edge": I. "The Solid Time of Change"; II. "Total Mass Retain"; III. "I Get Up, I Get Down"; IV. "Seasons of Man"	Anderson, Howe, Squire	19:25
2.	"Excerpts from The Six Wives of Henry VIII"	Wakeman	6:12
3.	"Roundabout"	Anderson, Howe	8:44
4.	"Yours Is No Disgrace"	Anderson, Squire, Howe, Bruford, Kaye	15:44

==== 20 November 1972 – Uniondale, New York ====
Disc thirteen
No.	Title	Writer(s)	Length
1.	"Opening (Excerpt from Firebird Suite)~Siberian Khatru"	Stravinsky~Anderson, Howe, Wakeman	12:28
2.	"I've Seen All Good People": a. "Your Move"; b. "All Good People"	Anderson, Squire	7:59
3.	"Heart of the Sunrise"	Anderson, Bruford, Squire	11:37
4.	"Mood for a Day/Clap"	Howe	6:51
5.	"And You and I": I. "Cord of Life"; II. "Eclipse"; III. "The Preacher, the Teacher"; IV. "Apocalypse"	Anderson; themes by Bruford, Howe, Squire	11:05

Disc fourteen
No.	Title	Writer(s)	Length
1.	"Close to the Edge": I. "The Solid Time of Change"; II. "Total Mass Retain"; III. "I Get Up, I Get Down"; IV. "Seasons of Man"	Anderson, Howe, Squire	19:48
2.	"Excerpts from The Six Wives of Henry VIII"	Wakeman	6:33
3.	"Roundabout"	Anderson, Howe	8:35
4.	"Yours Is No Disgrace"	Anderson, Squire, Howe, Bruford, Kaye	17:36

=== Highlights from Seventy-Two ===
Disc one
No.	Title	Writer(s)	Recording date and location	Length
1.	"Opening (Excerpt from Firebird Suite)~Siberian Khatru"	Stravinsky~Anderson, Howe, Wakeman	20 November 1972, Uniondale, New York	12:19
2.	"I've Seen All Good People": a. "Your Move"; b. "All Good People"	Anderson, Squire	15 November 1972, Knoxville, Tennessee	7:21
3.	"Heart of the Sunrise"	Anderson, Bruford, Squire	15 November 1972, Knoxville, Tennessee	11:12
4.	"Clap/Mood for a Day"	Howe	12 November 1972, Greensboro, North Carolina	5:49
5.	"And You and I": I. "Cord of Life"; II. "Eclipse"; III. "The Preacher, the Teacher"; IV. "Apocalypse"	Anderson; themes by Bruford, Howe, Squire	11 November 1972, Durham, North Carolina	9:55

Disc two
No.	Title	Writer(s)	Recording date and location	Length
1.	"Close to the Edge": I. "The Solid Time of Change"; II. "Total Mass Retain"; III. "I Get Up, I Get Down"; IV. "Seasons of Man"	Anderson, Howe, Squire	11 November 1972, Durham, North Carolina	18:24
2.	"Excerpts from The Six Wives of Henry VIII"	Wakeman	12 November 1972, Greensboro, North Carolina	7:09
3.	"Roundabout"	Anderson, Howe	31 October 1972, Toronto, Canada	8:37
4.	"Yours Is No Disgrace"	Anderson, Squire, Howe, Bruford, Tony Kaye	12 November 1972, Greensboro, North Carolina	16:04

== Personnel ==
Yes

- Jon Anderson – vocals, percussion
- Steve Howe – guitar, vocals
- Chris Squire – bass, vocals
- Rick Wakeman – keyboards
- Alan White – drums

Production

- Brian Kehew – production, 2014 mixing
- Steve Woolard – production
- Carmine Rubino – original 1972 recording
- Geoff Haslam – original 1972 recording
- Mike Dunn – original 1972 recording
- Dean Phelps – mastering
- Paul Silvera – management
- Kate Dear – packaging management
- Josh Phillips – product manager
- Todd Lampe – project assistance
- Ralph Bennett – project assistance
- Mike Johnson – project assistance
- Pat Smear – project assistance
- Larry Fast – project assistance
- Gene Stopp – project assistance
- Steve Frothingham – project assistance

== Charts ==
Chart (2015)	Peak position
German Albums (Offizielle Top 100)	57
Hungarian Albums (MAHASZ)	10
Italian Albums (FIMI)	48
Japanese Albums (Oricon)	154
Scottish Albums (Official Charts)	52
UK Albums (Official Charts)	64
UK Rock & Metal Albums (Official Charts)	6
US Top Rock Albums (Billboard)	42
