= Like It Is: Yes at the Bristol Hippodrome =

Live album by Yes
- Released: 8 December 2014
- Recorded: 11 May 2014
- Venues: Bristol Hippodrome, Bristol
- Genre: Progressive rock
- Length: 93:02
- Label: Frontiers Records
- Producer: Yes

Yes chronology
Heaven & Earth (2014)	Like It Is: Yes at the Bristol Hippodrome (2014)	Progeny: Seven Shows from Seventy-Two (2015)

Yes video chronology
Live Hemel Hempstead Pavilion October 3rd 1971 (2014)	Like It Is: Yes at the Bristol Hippodrome (2014)	Like It Is: Yes at the Mesa Arts Center (2015)

Like It Is: Yes at the Bristol Hippodrome is a live video album by English progressive rock band Yes, released on CD, DVD, and Blu-ray on 8 December, 2014, by Frontiers Records. It is their first live album featuring keyboardist Geoff Downes and lead vocalist Jon Davison in the band, after joining the group in 2011 and 2012, respectively.

It documents Yes's performance at the Bristol Hippodrome on 11 May 2014 during their first Album Series Tour. The live album features Going for the One (1977) and The Yes Album (1971), both performed in their entirety and in track order. The concert also included a complete performance of Close to the Edge (1972), but this was omitted from the release. The following live album and video, Like It Is: Yes at the Mesa Arts Center (2015), instead featured complete performances of Close to the Edge and Fragile (1971).

== Overview ==
Like It Is: Yes at the Bristol Hippodrome is a partial recording of the Yes show on 11 May, 2014, at the Bristol Hippodrome as a part of their 2013–14 Three Album Tour. The recording features only two of the albums, Going for the One (1977) and The Yes Album (1971) played live in their entirety. Thus, the Close to the Edge album is missing.

It is the band's first live album featuring lead vocalist Jon Davison and keyboardist Geoff Downes in the band's line-up. Downes previously featured on three tracks of the 3-CD set The Word Is Live, released in 2005.

A sequel, titled Like It Is: Yes at the Mesa Arts Center and featuring the albums Close to the Edge and Fragile was released in July 2015.

== Critical reception ==
Professional ratings
Review scores
Source	Rating
AllMusic	3.5/5 stars

In a positive review for AllMusic, Matt Collar rated Like It Is: Yes at the Bristol Hippodrome three-and-a-half stars out of five and said that, "this is an epic live experience that finds Yes celebrating its classic '70s sound."

== Track listing ==
CD 1 — Going for the One
No.	Title	Writer(s)	Length
1.	"Going for the One"	Jon Anderson	6:51
2.	"Turn of the Century"	Anderson, Steve Howe, Alan White	8:36
3.	"Parallels"	Chris Squire	6:24
4.	"Wonderous Stories"	Anderson	4:49
5.	"Awaken"	Anderson, Howe	17:40

CD 2 — The Yes Album
No.	Title	Writer(s)	Length
1.	"Yours Is No Disgrace"	Anderson, Squire, Howe, Tony Kaye, Bill Bruford	11:04
2.	"Clap"	Howe	3:42
3.	"Starship Trooper": a. "Life Seeker"; b. "Disillusion"; c. "Würm"	Anderson, Howe, Squire	11:19
4.	"I've Seen All Good People": a. "Your Move"; b. "All Good People"	Anderson, Squire	7:30
5.	"A Venture"	Anderson	5:03
6.	"Perpetual Change"	Anderson, Squire	10:04

== Personnel ==
Yes

- Jon Davison – lead vocals, acoustic guitar, percussion, keyboard
- Steve Howe – electric and acoustic guitars, backing vocals
- Chris Squire – bass guitar, backing vocals
- Geoff Downes – keyboards
- Alan White – drums, percussion

Production

- Patrick Shevelin – recording
- Billy Sherwood – mixing
- Maor Appelbaum – mastering
- Chris Squire – mixing assistance
- Jon Davison – mixing assistance
- Jerry & Lois Photography – photography
- Roger Dean – painting
- Giulio Cataldo – booklet editor and layout

== Charts ==
Chart (2014)	Peak position
UK Independent Albums (Official Charts)	24
UK Rock & Metal Albums (Official Charts)	15
