= List of Yes concert tours (2000s–10s) =

The English progressive rock band Yes has toured for five decades.

The band's longest break in touring came from late 2004 through late 2008. Touring has tended to focus on the UK and the rest of Europe, North America and Japan, but the band have also played other parts of the world, notably Australia.

== Masterworks Tour ==
Masterworks Tour
- World tour by Yes
- Location: North America
- Start date: 20 June 2000
- End date: 4 August 2000
- Legs: 1
- No. of shows: 30

Setlist:

- "Close to the Edge" (Anderson, Howe)
- "Starship Trooper" (Anderson, Squire, Howe)
- "The Gates of Delirium" (Anderson, Squire, Howe, White, Moraz)
- "Leaves of Green" (Anderson, Squire, Howe, Wakeman, White)
- "Heart of the Sunrise" (Anderson, Squire, Bruford)
- "Ritual (Nous Sommes du Soleil)" (Anderson, Squire, Howe, Wakeman, White)
- "I've Seen All Good People" (Anderson, Squire) (Added on 21 June 2000)
- "Roundabout" (Anderson, Howe)

Date	City	Country	Venue
20 June 2000	Reno	United States	Reno Hilton Amphitheater
21 June 2000	Concord	United States	Chronicle Pavilion
23 June 2000	Universal City	United States	Universal Amphitheatre
24 June 2000	San Bernardino	United States	Blockbuster Pavilion
25 June 2000	Phoenix	United States	Desert Sky Pavilion
27 June 2000	Albuquerque	United States	Mesa del Sol Amphitheater
28 June 2000	Denver	United States	Fillmore Auditorium
30 June 2000	Maryland Heights	United States	Riverport Amphitheatre
1 July 2000	Bonner Springs	United States	Sandstone Amphitheater
2 July 2000	Dallas	United States	Starplex Amphitheatre
5 July 2000	Burgettstown	United States	Star Lake Amphitheatre
6 July 2000	Cuyahoga Falls	United States	Blossom Music Center
7 July 2000	Columbus	United States	Polaris Amphitheater
8 July 2000	Chicago	United States	Grant Park
11 July 2000	Clarkston	United States	Pine Knob Music Theatre
15 July 2000	Wantagh	United States	Jones Beach Amphitheatre
16 July 2000	Saratoga Springs	United States	Saratoga Performing Arts Center
18 July 2000	Camden	United States	Sony Music Center
19 July 2000	Holmdel	United States	PNC Bank Arts Center
21 July 2000	Boston	United States	FleetBoston Pavilion
22 July 2000	Hartford	United States	Meadows Music Theatre
23 July 2000	Bristow	United States	Nissan Pavilion
25 July 2000	Virginia Beach	United States	Virginia Beach Amphitheatre
27 July 2000	Raleigh	United States	Alltel Pavilion
28 July 2000	Charlotte	United States	Blockbuster Pavilion
29 July 2000	Nashville	United States	AmSouth Amphitheatre
30 July 2000	Atlanta	United States	Lakewood Amphitheater
1 August 2000	West Palm Beach	United States	Mars Music Amphitheatre
3 August 2000	Noblesville	United States	Deer Creek Music Center
4 August 2000	Cincinnati	United States	Riverbend Music Center

== The Symphonic Tour ==
The Symphonic Tour
- World tour by Yes
- Location: North America, Europe
- Associated album: Magnification
- Start date: 22 July 2001
- End date: 13 December 2001
- Legs: 2
- No. of shows: 69

Setlist:

- "Give Love Each Day" (Anderson, Squire, Howe, White)
- "Close to the Edge" (Anderson, Howe)
- "Long Distance Runaround" (Anderson)
- "Don't Go" (Anderson, Squire, Howe, White)
- "In the Presence Of" (Anderson, Squire, Howe, White)
- "The Gates of Delirium" (Anderson, Squire, Howe, White, Moraz)
- "Wonderous Stories" (Anderson) (Dropped after 29 August 2001)
- "Perpetual Change" (Anderson, Squire) (Dropped after 27 October 2001)
- "Steve Howe solo section" (Howe) (Added on 30 July 2001)
- "Starship Trooper" (Anderson, Squire, Howe)
- "Magnification" (Anderson, Squire, Howe, White) (Added on 19 November 2001)
- "And You and I" (Anderson, Squire, Howe, Bruford)
- "Ritual (Nous Sommes du Soleil)" (Anderson, Squire, Howe, Wakeman, White)
- "I've Seen All Good People" (Anderson, Squire)
- "Roundabout" (Anderson, Howe)

"Owner of a Lonely Heart" was also occasionally played.

Date	City	Country	Venue
North America
22 July 2001	Reno	United States	Silver Legacy Resort Casino
25 July 2001	San Diego	United States	Navy Pier
26 July 2001	Henderson	United States	Sunset Station
28 July 2001	Kelseyville	United States	Konocti Field Amphitheater
30 July 2001	Los Angeles	United States	Hollywood Bowl
31 July 2001	Concord	United States	Chronicle Pavilion
2 August 2001	Vancouver	Canada	Queen Elizabeth Theatre
3 August 2001	Woodinville	United States	Chateau Ste. Michelle
5 August 2001	Greenwood Village	United States	Coors Amphitheatre
7 August 2001	Minneapolis	United States	State Theatre
8 August 2001	Chicago	United States	Arie Crown Theater
10 August 2001	Cuyahoga Falls	United States	Blossom Music Center
11 August 2001	Columbus	United States	Palace Theatre
12 August 2001	Clarkston	United States	DTE Energy Music Theatre
14 August 2001	Interlochen	United States	Interlochen Center for the Arts
15 August 2001	Milwaukee	United States	Riverside Theater
16 August 2001	Kettering	United States	Fraze Pavilion
18 August 2001	Atlanta	United States	Chastain Park
19 August 2001	Portsmouth	United States	Harbor Center
21 August 2001	Philadelphia	United States	Mann Center for the Performing Arts
22 August 2001	Lewiston	United States	Earl W. Brydges Artpark
24 August 2001	Vienna	United States	Filene Center
25 August 2001	Uncasville	United States	Uncas Pavilion
26 August 2001	Quebec City	Canada	Colisée Pepsi
28 August 2001	Toronto	Canada	Molson Amphitheatre
29 August 2001	Montreal	Canada	Molson Center
31 August 2001	Boston	United States	FleetBoston Pavilion
1 September 2001	Wallingford	United States	Oakdale Theatre
2 September 2001	Saratoga Springs	United States	Saratoga Performing Arts Center
3 September 2001	Danbury	United States	The Charles Ives Center for the Arts
6 September 2001	Holmdel	United States	PNC Bank Arts Center
7 September 2001	Wantagh	United States	Jones Beach Amphitheatre
8 September 2001	New York City	United States	Radio City Music Hall
Europe
25 October 2001	Vienna	Austria	Musik Hall Libro
26 October 2001	Katowice	Poland	Spodek
27 October 2001	Warsaw	Poland	Torwar Hall
29 October 2001	Riga	Latvia	Kipsala Hall
31 October 2001	Moscow	Russia	State Kremlin Palace
2 November 2001	Tallinn	Estonia	Tallinn Spordihall
3 November 2001	Saint Petersburg	Russia	Ice Palace
4 November 2001	Helsinki	Finland	Hartwall Areena
6 November 2001	Stockholm	Sweden	The Circus
7 November 2001	Oslo	Norway	Oslo Konserthus
9 November 2001	Berlin	Germany	Internationales Congress Centrum Berlin
10 November 2001	Leipzig	Germany	Gewandhaus zu Leipzig
11 November 2001	Prague	Czech Republic	Industrial Palace
13 November 2001	Stuttgart	Germany	Kultur Und Kongresszentrum Liederhalle
14 November 2001	Frankfurt	Germany	Alte Oper
16 November 2001	Zurich	Switzerland	Kongresshaus Zurich
17 November 2001	Milan	Italy	Palavobis
19 November 2001	Hamburg	Germany	Halle
20 November 2001	Düsseldorf	Germany	Philipshalle
21 November 2001	Amsterdam	Netherlands	Heineken Music Hall
22 November 2001	Amsterdam	Netherlands	Heineken Music Hall
24 November 2001	Antwerp	Belgium	Antwerpen Sportspaleis
25 November 2001	Roubaix	France	Parvis du Colise
26 November 2001	Paris	France	L'Olympia
28 November 2001	Manchester	UK	Apollo Theatre
29 November 2001	Dublin	Ireland	Point Depot
1 December 2001	Brighton	UK	Brighton Centre
2 December 2001	Birmingham	UK	National Indoor Arena
4 December 2001	London	UK	Hammersmith Odeon
5 December 2001	London	UK	Hammersmith Odeon
7 December 2001	Cardiff	UK	St David's Hall
8 December 2001	Nottingham	UK	Nottingham Royal Concert Hall
9 December 2001	Glasgow	UK	Clyde Auditorium
11 December 2001	Sheffield	UK	Sheffield City Hall
12 December 2001	Newcastle	UK	Newcastle City Hall
13 December 2001	Manchester	UK	Apollo Theatre

== Full Circle Tour ==
Full Circle Tour
- World tour by Yes
- Location: North America, Europe, Asia
- Start date: 16 July 2002
- End date: 4 October 2003
- Legs: 4
- No. of shows: 99 (100 scheduled)

Setlist:

- "Siberian Khatru" (Anderson, Howe, Wakeman)
- "Magnification" (Anderson, Squire, Howe, White)
- "America" (Simon) (Dropped after 25 August 2002)
- "Don't Kill the Whale" (Anderson, Squire)
- "In the Presence Of" (Anderson, Squire, Howe, White)
- "We Have Heaven" (Anderson)
- "South Side of the Sky" (Anderson, Squire)
- "The Revealing Science of God (Dance of the Dawn)" (Anderson, Squire, Howe, Wakeman, White) (Dropped after 25 August 2002)
- "Close to the Edge" (Anderson, Howe) (Played from 24 October 2002 to 8 December 2002)
- "And You and I" (Anderson, Squire, Howe, Bruford) (Dropped from 31 October 2002 to 3 June 2003)
- Steve Howe solo section (Howe)
- "Show Me" (Anderson)
- Wakeman solo (Wakeman)
- "Heart of the Sunrise" (Anderson, Squire, Bruford)
- "Long Distance Runaround / Whitefish" (Anderson, Squire)
- "Awaken" (Anderson, Howe)
- "I've Seen All Good People" (Anderson, Squire) (Added on 24 June 2003)
- "Roundabout" (Anderson, Howe) (Dropped between 12 November 2002 and 3 June 2003)
- "Yours Is No Disgrace" (Anderson, Squire, Howe, Kaye, Bruford) (Dropped after 25 August 2002)
- "Starship Trooper" (Anderson, Squire, Howe) (Added on 24 October 2002)

Also occasionally played were:

- "Nine Voices (Longwalker)" (Anderson, Squire, Howe, White, Sherwood, Khoroshev) (Played on 21 November 2002)
- "Owner of a Lonely Heart" (Anderson, Rabin, Squire, Horn) (Played on 15, 16, and 27 September 2003)

Date	City	Country	Venue
North America
16 July 2002	Kirkland	United States	Kirkland Performance Center
17 July 2002	Seattle	United States	Paramount Theatre
19 July 2002	Kelseyville	United States	Konocti Field Amphitheater
20 July 2002	Mountain View	United States	Shoreline Amphitheatre
22 July 2002	Denver	United States	City Lights Pavilion
23 July 2002	Bonner Springs	United States	Verizon Wireless Amphitheater
25 July 2002	Maryland Heights	United States	UMB Bank Pavilion
26 July 2002	Chicago	United States	Chicago Theatre
27 July 2002	Detroit	United States	Fox Theatre
29 July 2002	Cuyahoga Falls	United States	Blossom Music Center
31 July 2002	Toronto	Canada	Molson Amphitheater
2 August 2002	Mansfield	United States	Tweeter Center
3 August 2002	Wantagh	United States	Jones Beach Amphitheater
5 August 2002	New York City	United States	Radio City Music Hall
6 August 2002	Holmdel	United States	PNC Bank Arts Center
8 August 2002	Camden	United States	Tweeter Center
9 August 2002	Columbia	United States	Merriweather Post Pavilion
10 August 2002	Tampa	United States	USF Sun Dome
11 August 2002	West Palm Beach	United States	Mars Music Amphitheater
13 August 2002	Atlanta	United States	HiFi Buys Amphitheatre
15 August 2002	The Woodlands	United States	Cynthia Woods Mitchell Pavilion
16 August 2002	Bee Cave	United States	The Backyard
17 August 2002	Dallas	United States	Smirnoff Music Centre
20 August 2002	Santa Fe	United States	Paolo Soleri Amphitheatre
21 August 2002	Phoenix	United States	Cricket Pavilion
23 August 2002	Universal City	United States	Universal Amphitheater
24 August 2002	Las Vegas	United States	Las Vegas Hilton
25 August 2002	Las Vegas	United States	Las Vegas Hilton
North America
24 October 2002	Clearwater	United States	Ruth Eckerd Hall
25 October 2002	Atlanta	United States	Chastain Park
27 October 2002	South Bend	United States	Morris Performing Arts Center
28 October 2002	Columbus	United States	Value City Arena
30 October 2002	Fort Wayne	United States	Embassy Theatre
31 October 2002	University Park	United States	Bryce Jordan Center
2 November 2002	Wallingford	United States	Oakdale Theatre
4 November 2002	Albany	United States	Pepsi Arena
5 November 2002	Rochester	United States	Blue Cross Arena
7 November 2002	Durham	United States	Whittemore Center Arena
8 November 2002	Upper Darby	United States	Tower Theater
9 November 2002	Upper Darby	United States	Tower Theater
11 November 2002	Newark	United States	New Jersey Performing Arts Center
12 November 2002	Washington, D.C.	United States	DAR Constitution Hall
15 November 2002	Akron	United States	Akron Civic Theater
16 November 2002	Toronto	Canada	Massey Hall
17 November 2002	Ottawa	Canada	Corel Centre
19 November 2002	Madison	United States	Alliant Energy Center
21 November 2002	Chicago	United States	Chicago Theatre
22 November 2002	Milwaukee	United States	Riverside Theater
23 November 2002	Minneapolis	United States	Orpheum Theatre
26 November 2002	Spokane	United States	Star Theater
27 November 2002	Seattle	United States	Benaroya Hall
29 November 2002	Stateline	United States	Caesars Tahoe
30 November 2002	Cupertino	United States	Flint Center
2 December 2002	San Diego	United States	Copley Symphony Hall
3 December 2002	Las Vegas	United States	Hard Rock Cafe
5 December 2002	Universal City	United States	Universal Amphitheater
8 December 2002	Mexico City	Mexico	National Auditorium
Europe
3 June 2003	Dublin	Ireland	Vicar Street
5 June 2003	Cardiff	UK	Cardiff International Arena
6 June 2003	Nottingham	UK	Nottingham Royal Concert Hall
8 June 2003	Sölvesborg	Sweden	Sweden Rock Festival
10 June 2003	Hamburg	Germany	Hamburg Stadpark
11 June 2003	Berlin	Germany	Tempodrom
12 June 2003	Leipzig	Germany	Leipzig Parkbuhne
14 June 2003	Dresden	Germany	Dresden Garde
15 June 2003	Warsaw	Poland	Sala Kongresowa
17 June 2003	Prague	Czech Republic	T-Mobile Arena
18 June 2003	Budapest	Hungary	Arena
20 June 2003	Stuttgart	Germany	Messekongress
21 June 2003	Mainz	Germany	Rheingoldhalle
22 June 2003	Brussels	Belgium	Cirque Royal
24 June 2003	Rotterdam	Netherlands	Rotterdam Ahoy
25 June 2003	Hanover	Germany	Hanover Parkbuhne
28 June 2003	Paris	France	Palais des Congrès de Paris
29 June 2003	Glastonbury	UK	Glastonbury Festival
1 July 2003	London	UK	Hammersmith Odeon
2 July 2003	London	UK	Hammersmith Odeon
3 July 2003	Birmingham	UK	National Indoor Arena
5 July 2003	Liverpool	UK	Liverpool Kings Dock
6 July 2003	Edinburgh	UK	Playhouse Theatre
8 July 2003	Bonn	Germany	Museumsplatz der Kunst
9 July 2003	Munich	Germany	Tollwood Festival
11 July 2003	Rome	Italy	Centrale del tennis
12 July 2003	Vado Ligure	Italy	Chittolina Stadio
14 July 2003	Montreux	Switzerland	Montreux Festival
15 July 2003	Singen	Germany	Hohentwiel
~~17 July 2003~~	London	UK	Hyde Park
19 July 2003	Barcelona	Spain	Razzmatazz
21 July 2003	Estepona	Spain	Plaza de Toros
22 July 2003	Madrid	Spain	Patio Central Cuartel Conde Duque
Pacific Rim/North America
12 September 2003	Osaka	Japan	Kouseinennkin Kaikan
14 September 2003	Tokyo	Japan	International Forum Hall
15 September 2003	Tokyo	Japan	International Forum Hall
16 September 2003	Yokohama	Japan	Kanagawa Kenmin Hall
19 September 2003	Melbourne	Australia	Melbourne Arena
20 September 2003	Sydney	Australia	Sydney Entertainment Centre
23 September 2003	Perth	Australia	Burswood Theatre
25 September 2003	Singapore	Singapore	Suntec City Hall
27 September 2003	Honolulu	United States	Neal S. Blaisdell Arena
4 October 2003	Irvine	United States	Verizon Wireless Amphitheatre

== 35th Anniversary Tour ==
35th Anniversary Tour
- World tour by Yes
- Location: North America, Europe
- Start date: 15 April 2004
- End date: 22 September 2004
- Legs: 3
- No. of shows: 64 (68 scheduled)

Setlist:

- "Going for the One" (Anderson)
- "Sweet Dreams" (Anderson, Foster)
- "I've Seen All Good People" (Anderson, Squire)
- "America" (Simon) (Added starting on 20 August 2004)
- "Close to the Edge" (Anderson, Howe) (Played from 20 August 2004 to 31 August 2004)
- "Mind Drive" (Anderson, Squire, Howe, Wakeman, White) (Dropped after 22 August 2004)
- "South Side of the Sky" (Anderson, Squire)
- "Turn of the Century" (Anderson, Howe, White) (Dropped after 23 June 2004)
- "Yours Is No Disgrace" (Anderson, Squire, Howe, Kaye, Bruford)
- "The Meeting" (Anderson, Howe, Wakeman, Bruford) (Dropped after 23 June 2004)
- "Long Distance Runaround" (Anderson)
- "Wonderous Stories" (Anderson)
- "Time Is Time" (Anderson, Squire, Howe, White) (Dropped after 23 June 2004)
- "Roundabout" (Anderson, Howe)
- "Show Me" (Anderson) (Dropped after 23 June 2004)
- "Owner of a Lonely Heart" (Anderson, Rabin, Squire, Horn) (Added on 10 May 2004)
- Steve Howe solo section (Howe)
- "Rhythm of Love" (Kaye, Rabin, Squire, Anderson; Anderson, Howe) (Replaced by "Awaken" on 17 August 2004)
- "And You and I" (Anderson, Squire, Howe, Bruford)
- "Ritual (Nous Sommes du Soleil)" (Anderson, Squire, Howe, Wakeman, White) (Dropped after 23 June 2004)
- "Every Little Thing" (Lennon-McCartney) (Dropped after 15 May 2004)
- "Soon" (Anderson) (Dropped after 13 May 2004)
- "Starship Trooper" (Anderson, Squire, Howe) (Added on 12 May 2004)

Also occasionally played were:

- "Don't Kill the Whale" (Anderson, Squire) (Played on 27 August 2004, 28 August 2004, 2 September 2004, and 3 September 2004)
- "Time and a Word" (Anderson, Foster) (Played on 11 September 2004)
- Wakeman solo/"Morning has Broken" (Wakeman) (Played on 11 July 2004)
- "Whitefish" (White, Squire) (Played on 13 June 2004, 7 July 2004, 8 July 2004, 10 July 2004, and 12 July 2004)
- "Nine Voices (Longwalker)" (Anderson, Squire, Howe, White, Sherwood, Khoroshev) (Played on 15 April 2004, 4 May 2004, and 11 July 2004)

Date	City	Country	Venue
North America
15 April 2004	Seattle	United States	KeyArena
17 April 2004	San Jose	United States	HP Pavilion
18 April 2004	San Diego	United States	Cox Arena
20 April 2004	Anaheim	United States	Arrowhead Pond
21 April 2004	Paradise	United States	Mandalay Bay Events Center
24 April 2004	Mexico City	Mexico	Metropolitan Theatre
27 April 2004	Greensboro	United States	Greensboro Coliseum
28 April 2004	Atlanta	United States	Philips Arena
30 April 2004	Sunrise	United States	Office Depot Center
2 May 2004	Tampa	United States	St. Pete Times Forum
4 May 2004	Rosemont	United States	Allstate Arena
5 May 2004	Grand Rapids	United States	Van Andel Arena
7 May 2004	Toronto	Canada	Air Canada Centre
8 May 2004	Auburn Hills	United States	The Palace of Auburn Hills
10 May 2004	Philadelphia	United States	The Spectrum
12 May 2004	Uncasville	United States	Mohegan Sun Arena
13 May 2004	New York City	United States	Madison Square Garden
15 May 2004	Lowell	United States	Paul E. Tsongas Arena
Europe
2 June 2004	Helsinki	Finland	Helsinki Ice Hall
4 June 2004	Stockholm	Sweden	Globe Arena
5 June 2004	Oslo	Norway	Spektrum
7 June 2004	Warsaw	Poland	Sala Kongresowa
8 June 2004	Prague	Czech Republic	Sazka Arena
10 June 2004	Munich	Germany	Olympiahalle
11 June 2004	Karlsruhe	Germany	Europahalle
12 June 2004	Düsseldorf	Germany	Philipshalle
13 June 2004	Lichtenvoorde	Netherlands	Arrow Rock Festival
15 June 2004	Antwerp	Belgium	Koningin Elisabethzaal
16 June 2004	London	England	Wembley Arena
18 June 2004	Birmingham	England	National Exhibition Centre
19 June 2004	Manchester	England	Manchester Evening News Arena
20 June 2004	Glasgow	Scotland	Scottish Exhibition and Conference Centre
22 June 2004	Paris	France	Le Zénith
23 June 2004	Frankfurt	Germany	Jahrhunderthalle Hoechst
~~28 June 2004~~	Lisbon	Portugal	Coliseu dos Recreios
~~29 June 2004~~	Madrid	Spain	La Riviera
~~30 June 2004~~	Barcelona	Spain	Razzmatazz
2 July 2004	Voghera	Italy	Piazza del Duomo
5 July 2004	Cagliari	Italy	Sardegna
7 July 2004	Brescia	Italy	Pala Brescia
8 July 2004	Lugano	Switzerland	Switzerland Lugano Estival Jazz
10 July 2004	Devon	England	Powderham Castle
11 July 2004	Oxford	England	New Theatre Oxford
12 July 2004	Braintree	England	Towerlands Indoor Arena
~~14 July 2004~~	Istanbul	Turkey	Istanbul Jazz Festival
North America
17 August 2004	Quebec City	Canada	L'Agora Du Vieux Port
18 August 2004	Montreal	Canada	Bell Centre
20 August 2004	Atlantic City	United States	The Borgata
~~21 August 2004~~	Atlantic City	United States	The Borgata
22 August 2004	Hartford	United States	Meadows Music Theater
24 August 2004	Cuyahoga Falls	United States	Blossom Music Center
25 August 2004	Bristow	United States	Jiffy Lube Live
27 August 2004	Holmdel	United States	PNC Bank Arts Center
28 August 2004	Wantagh	United States	Jones Beach Amphitheater
30 August 2004	London	Canada	John Labatt Centre
31 August 2004	Niagara Falls	United States	Conference Center
2 September 2004	Syracuse	United States	Great New York State Fair
3 September 2004	Allentown	United States	Allentown Fairgrounds
4 September 2004	Essex Junction	United States	Champlain Valley Exposition
7 September 2004	Minneapolis	United States	Target Center
8 September 2004	Merrillville	United States	Star Plaza Theatre
10 September 2004	Morrison	United States	Red Rocks Amphitheatre
11 September 2004	Loveland	United States	Budweiser Events Center
13 September 2004	Albuquerque	United States	Sandia Casino
14 September 2004	Mesa	United States	Mesa Amphitheatre
16 September 2004	Alpine	United States	Viejas Arena
17 September 2004	Concord	United States	Concord Pavilion
19 September 2004	Universal City	United States	Universal Amphitheater
22 September 2004	Monterrey	Mexico	Arena Monterrey

A Yes consisting of Chris Squire, Steve Howe, Alan White, Trevor Rabin and Geoff Downes (with Trevor Horn on backing vocals) appeared as one of several acts at the November 2004 "Produced By Trevor Horn: A Concert For The Prince's Trust" at Wembley Arena in London. They performed "Cinema" and "Owner of a Lonely Heart".

== Close to the Edge and Back (40th Anniversary) Tour (cancelled) ==
In 2007, the band planned summer 2008 dates as the Close to the Edge and Back tour, with Jon Anderson, Chris Squire, Steve Howe and Alan White being joined by Oliver Wakeman on keyboards, as a replacement for (as suggested by) his father, Rick Wakeman. However, Anderson suffered acute respiratory failure before the tour, which had to be cancelled. With Anderson out of action recuperating, Squire, Howe and White went on tour with Oliver Wakeman and replacement vocalist Benoît David (from Canadian band Mystery). The tour resumed under the name "In the Present Tour" on 4 November 2008 in Hamilton, Ontario, Canada with the two new musicians (see below).

Date	City	Country	Venue
Close to the Edge and Back (40th Anniversary) Tour – North America leg (cancelled)
~~12 July 2008~~	Quebec City	Canada	Quebec City Summer Festival
~~13 July 2008~~	Toronto	Canada	Molson Amphitheater
~~15 July 2008~~	Columbus	United States	Nationwide Arena
~~16 July 2008~~	Derry	United States	Hersheypark Stadium
~~18 July 2008~~	Chicago	United States	Charter One Pavilion
~~19 July 2008~~	Detroit	United States	Freedom Hill Amphitheater
~~21 July 2008~~	Camden	United States	Susquehanna Bank Center
~~22 July 2008~~	Montville	United States	Mohegan Sun Arena
~~23 July 2008~~	Boston	United States	Bank of America Pavilion
~~25 July 2008~~	Atlantic City	United States	Borgata Events Center
~~26 July 2008~~	Hempstead	United States	Nikon Theater
~~28 July 2008~~	Holmdel	United States	PNC Bank Arts Center
~~29 July 2008~~	Baltimore	United States	Pier 6 Pavilion
~~31 July 2008~~	Tampa	United States	Ford Amphitheatre
~~1 August 2008~~	Miami	United States	Hard Rock Live
~~2 August 2008~~	Orlando	United States	Hard Rock Live
~~4 August 2008~~	Atlanta	United States	Verizon Wireless Amphitheater
~~6 August 2008~~	Kansas City	United States	Starlight Theatre
~~8 August 2008~~	The Woodlands	United States	Cynthia Woods Mitchell Pavilion
~~9 August 2008~~	Dallas	United States	Superpages.com Center
~~11 August 2008~~	Denver	United States	Red Rocks Amphitheatre
~~14 August 2008~~	Vancouver	Canada	General Motors Place
~~15 August 2008~~	Seattle	United States	WaMu Theater
~~19 August 2008~~	Mountain View	United States	Shoreline Amphitheatre
~~20 August 2008~~	Anaheim	United States	Honda Center
~~22 August 2008~~	Universal City	United States	Gibson Amphitheater

== In the Present Tour ==
An initial North America leg #2 started on 12 February 2009 was cut short when Squire suffered a medical emergency.

Usually performed songs:

- "Roundabout"
- "And You and I"
- "Tempus Fugit"
- "Owner of a Lonely Heart"
- "I've Seen All Good People"
- "Starship Trooper"
- "Siberian Khatru"
- "Astral Traveller"
- "Machine Messiah"
- "Heart of the Sunrise"

Sometimes performed songs:

- "Onward"
- "Yours Is No Disgrace"
- "Close to the Edge"
- "South Side of the Sky"
- "Clap"
- "Perpetual Change"
- "Mood for a Day"
- "Long Distance Runaround"
- "The Fish (Schindleria Praematurus)"
- "Aliens (Are Only Us From the Future)"

Occasionally performed songs:

- "Second Initial" (played on 16 November 2008, 6 December 2008, 5 February 2009, 15, 16, 20 July 2009, 4, 6, 29 November 2009, 12 December 2009, 2, 14 February 2010, 9, 11 June 2010, 3 December 2010)
- "Parallels" (dropped after 25 November 2008)
- "Soon" (dropped after 26 November 2008, omitted on 19 November 2008)
- "Masquerade" (played on 12 November 2008, 6 December 2008, 2 August 2009, 2, 14 February 2010, 5 April 2010, 3 December 2010)
- "Leaves of Green" (played on 26, 29 June 2010)
- "To Be Over" (played on 23 November 2008, 9 December 2008)
- "Turn of the Century" (played on 20 June 2010)

Covers:

- "Intersection Blues" (played on 15, 18 November 2008, 7 December 2008, 2 August 2009, 4, 5 February 2010, 25 June 2010, 19, 23, 27 November 2010)
- "Classical Gas" (played on 16 November 2008, 14 December 2008, 4, 6, 26 November 2009, 30 June 2010, 3 July 2010)
- "Corkscrew" (played on 9 November 2008, 3 December 2008, 2, 17, 29 November 2009, 1 December 2009)
- "In the Course of the Day" (played on 14 November 2008, 3 December 2008, 30 October 2009, 5 December 2009, 16, 18 June 2010)
- "The Little Galliard" (played on 25 November 2008, 11 November 2009, 4, 5 February 2010, 25, 28 November 2010)
- "Concerto in D (2nd Movement)" (played on 19 November 2008, 9 December 2008, 8 July 2009, 4 December 2009, 27 June 2010)
- "Ram" (played on 22 November 2008, 14 December 2008, 7 November 2009, 12 June 2010, 4 December 2010)
- "Sketches in the Sun" (played on 9 November 2008, 1 August 2009, 2, 17 November 2009, 4 December 2010)
- "Cactus Boogie" (played on 12, 18 November 2008, 26 November 2009, 9 February 2010)
- "Winter, 2nd movement" (played on 22 November 2008, 22 July 2009, 16, 18 June 2010)
- "J's Theme" (played on 15 November 2008, 7 December 2008, 7 November 2009)
- "Surface Tension" (played on 10 December 2008, 10 November 2009, 1 November 2009)
- "The Valley of Rocks" (played on 26, 29 November 2008, 8 November 2009)
- "Australia" (played on 11 November 2008, 5 December 2008)
- "Bareback" (played on 5 December 2008, 13 February 2010)
- "Cat Napping" (played on 26 December 2008, 21 February 2010)
- "Country Mix" (played on 25 November 2008, 31 July 2009)
- "Diary of a Man Who Vanished" (played on 19 November 2008, 11 November 2009)
- "Golden Mean" (played on 11 November 2008, 8 February 2010)
- "Laughing With Larry" (played on 10 November 2008, 30 November 2009)
- "Pyramidology" (played on 23 November 2008, 21 November 2010)
- "Solar Winds" (played on 29 November 2008, 12 December 2009)
- "All's A Chord" (played on 30 November 2008)
- "Arada" (played on 25 November 2008)
- "Aria (Cantinela) (played on 28 November 2010)
- "Beginnings" (played on 19 November 2009)
- "Georgia's Theme" (played on 31 July 2009)
- "Heritage" (played on 28 November 2008)
- "Hint Hint" (played on 19 November 2009)
- "Meadow Rag" (played on 28 November 2008)
- "Mint Julep" (played on 21 February 2010)
- "Provence" (played on 8 February 2010)
- "Smile" (played on 11 November 2009)
- "The Glory of Love" (played on 2 December 2008)
- "Trambone" (played on 10 December 2008)
- "Wayward Course" (played on 9 February 2010)

Date	City	Country	Venue
North America leg #1 (as "Steve Howe, Chris Squire and Alan White of Yes")
4 November 2008	Hamilton	Canada	Hamilton Place Theatre
5 November 2008	Toronto	Canada	Massey Hall
7 November 2008	Hampton Beach	United States	Hampton Beach Casino Ballroom
8 November 2008	Williamsport	United States	Williamsport Community Arts Center
9 November 2008	Uncasville	United States	Mohegan Sun Arena
11 November 2008	Hershey	United States	Hersheypark Arena
12 November 2008	Columbus	United States	Lifestyle Communities Pavilion
14 November 2008	New York City	United States	Hammerstein Ballroom
15 November 2008	Asbury Park	United States	Paramount Theatre
16 November 2008	Baltimore	United States	Rams Head Live!
18 November 2008	Reading	United States	Sovereign Center
19 November 2008	Richmond	United States	The National
21 November 2008	Atlantic City	United States	Borgata Events Center
22 November 2008	Westbury	United States	Capital One Bank Theater
23 November 2008	Albany	United States	Times Union Center
25 November 2008	Cleveland	United States	House of Blues
26 November 2008	Detroit	United States	The Fillmore Detroit
28 November 2008	Cincinnati	United States	Taft Theatre
29 November 2008	Milwaukee	United States	Riverside Theater
30 November 2008	Bloomington	United States	U.S. Cellular Coliseum
2 December 2008	St. Louis	United States	The Pageant
3 December 2008	Chicago	United States	Chicago Theatre
5 December 2008	Greensboro	United States	Carolina Theatre
6 December 2008	North Myrtle Beach	United States	House of Blues
7 December 2008	Atlanta	United States	The Tabernacle
9 December 2008	Louisville	United States	The Louisville Palace
10 December 2008	Nashville	United States	Ryman Auditorium
12 December 2008	Biloxi	United States	Beau Rivage Casino
14 December 2008	Orlando	United States	Hard Rock Cafe
15 December 2008	Clearwater	United States	Ruth Eckerd Hall
17 December 2008	Hollywood	United States	Hard Rock Live
North America leg #2 (aborted)
5 February 2009	Mexico City	Mexico	Teatro Metropólitan
6 February 2009	Mexico City	Mexico	Teatro Metropólitan
~~9 February 2009~~	Houston	United States	House of Blues
~~10 February 2009~~	Dallas	United States	House of Blues
~~12 February 2009~~	Denver	United States	Paramount Theatre
~~14 February 2009~~	Portland	United States	Aladdin Theater
~~15 February 2009~~	Vancouver	Canada	Commodore Ballroom
~~17 February 2009~~	Spokane	United States	Knitting Factory
~~18 February 2009~~	Seattle	United States	Moore Theatre
~~19 February 2009~~	Boise	United States	BSU Pavilion
~~21 February 2009~~	Las Vegas	United States	House of Blues
~~22 February 2009~~	Anaheim	United States	Anaheim Stadium
~~24 February 2009~~	San Diego	United States	House of Blues
~~25 February 2009~~	Phoenix	United States	Dodge Theatre
~~27 February 2009~~	Los Angeles	United States	Wiltern Theater
~~28 February 2009~~	Reno	United States	Grand Sierra Resort & Casino
~~2 March 2009~~	San Francisco	United States	The Fillmore
~~3 March 2009~~	Clovis	United States	Table Mountain Casino
North America leg #3 (as "Yes") (Support act: Asia with Howe playing in both Asia's and Yes' sets)
26 June 2009	Indio	United States	Fantasy Springs Resort Casino
27 June 2009	Paradise	United States	Thomas & Mack Center
30 June 2009	Snoqualmie	United States	Snoqualmie Casino Events Center
2 July 2009	San Francisco	United States	The Warfield
3 July 2009	Saratoga	United States	Mountain Winery
5 July 2009	Anaheim	United States	House of Blues
7 July 2009	Universal City	United States	Gibson Amphitheatre
8 July 2009	San Diego	United States	Humphrey's Concerts by the Bay
9 July 2009	Phoenix	United States	Dodge Theatre
12 July 2009	Denver	United States	Paramount Theatre
14 July 2009	Kansas City	United States	Uptown Theater
15 July 2009	Fort Worth	United States	Bass Performance Hall
16 July 2009	Muskogee	United States	Muskogee Civic Center
18 July 2009	Walker	United States	Moondance Ranch Jam
20 July 2009	Clarkston	United States	DTE Energy Music Theatre
21 July 2009	Pittsburgh	United States	Chevrolet Amphitheatre
22 July 2009	Glen Allen	United States	Innsbrook Pavilion
23 July 2009	National Harbor	United States	Sunset Concerts
25 July 2009	Cohasset	United States	South Shore Music Circus
26 July 2009	Jackson	United States	North Star Arena
28 July 2009	Upper Darby	United States	Tower Theater
29 July 2009	Montclair	United States	Wellmont Theater
31 July 2009	Westbury	United States	Westbury Music Fair
1 August 2009	Jamestown	United States	Jamestown Savings Bank Ice Arena
2 August 2009	Bethlehem	United States	Sands RiverPlace
Europe
29 October 2009	Olomouc	Czech Republic	Palackého University Sports Hall
30 October 2009	Katowice	Poland	Spodek Hall
31 October 2009	Bratislava	Slovakia	Sport Hall Pasienky
2 November 2009	Vicenza	Italy	Teatro Comunale
4 November 2009	Rome	Italy	Teatro Tenda Strisce
6 November 2009	Milan	Italy	Teatro Degli Arcimboldi
7 November 2009	Hamburg	Germany	Jako Arena
8 November 2009	Karlsruhe	Germany	Schwarzwaldhalle
10 November 2009	Antwerp	Belgium	Koningin Elisabethzaal
11 November 2009	Paris	France	L'Olympia
12 November 2009	Nantes	France	Cité des Congrès
14 November 2009	Heerhugowaard	Netherlands	De Waerdse Tempel
16 November 2009	Birmingham	England	Birmingham Symphony Hall
17 November 2009	London	England	Hammersmith Apollo
19 November 2009	Edinburgh	Scotland	Usher Hall
20 November 2009	Newcastle	England	Newcastle City Hall
22 November 2009	Manchester	England	Apollo Theatre
23 November 2009	Bristol	England	Colston Hall
25 November 2009	Belfast	Northern Ireland	Waterfront Hall
26 November 2009	Dublin	Ireland	Olympia Theatre
29 November 2009	Rouen	France	Zénith de Rouen
1 December 2009	Lyon	France	Bourse du Travail
3 December 2009	Braunschweig	Germany	Stadthalle
4 December 2009	Kempten	Germany	Big Box
5 December 2009	Erfurt	Germany	Messehalle
7 December 2009	Munich	Germany	Gasteig Philharmonie
8 December 2009	Düsseldorf	Germany	Philipshalle
10 December 2009	Copenhagen	Denmark	Amager Bio
11 December 2009	Oslo	Norway	OsloSentrum Scene
12 December 2009	Gothenburg	Sweden	Liseberghallen
North America Leg #4
2 February 2010	Poughkeepsie	United States	Mid-Hudson Civic Center
4 February 2010	Concord	United States	Capitol Center for the Arts
5 February 2010	Jim Thorpe	United States	Penn's Peak
8 February 2010	Northampton	United States	Calvin Theater
9 February 2010	Boston	United States	House of Blues
12 February 2010	Atlantic City	United States	Tropicana Casino and Resort
13 February 2010	New York City	United States	The Town Hall
14 February 2010	New York City	United States	The Town Hall
15 February 2010	Washington, D.C.	United States	Warner Theatre
16 February 2010	Montclair	United States	Wellmont Theater
18 February 2010	Chicago	United States	House of Blues
19 February 2010	Chicago	United States	House of Blues
20 February 2010	Detroit	United States	MotorCity Casino Hotel
21 February 2010	Cleveland	United States	House of Blues
23 February 2010	Dallas	United States	House of Blues
24 February 2010	Houston	United States	House of Blues
25 February 2010	New Orleans	United States	House of Blues
27 February 2010	Orlando	United States	SeaWorld Orlando (free with admission)
28 February 2010	Boca Raton	United States	Sunset Cove Amphitheater
6 April 2010	Zacatecas City	Mexico	Plaza de Armas
North America leg #5 (with Peter Frampton)
8 June 2010	West Palm Beach	United States	Raymond F. Kravis Center for the Performing Arts
9 June 2010	Clearwater	United States	Ruth Eckerd Hall
11 June 2010	Biloxi	United States	Beau Rivage Theatre
12 June 2010	Tunica	United States	Harrah's Casino Tunica
15 June 2010	Upper Darby	United States	Tower Theater
16 June 2010	Uncasville	United States	Mohegan Sun Arena
18 June 2010	Bethel	United States	Bethel Woods Center for the Arts
19 June 2010	Atlantic City	United States	Borgata Events Center
20 June 2010	Washington	United States	Meadows Racetrack and Casino
23 June 2010	Vienna	United States	Filene Center
24 June 2010	Baltimore	United States	Pier Six Concert Pavilion
25 June 2010	Holmdel	United States	PNC Bank Arts Center
26 June 2010	Wantagh	United States	Nikon at Jones Beach Theater
27 June 2010	Montreal	United States	Montmorency Space
29 June 2010	Big Flats	United States	Tag's Summer Stage
30 June 2010	Canandaigua	United States	Constellation Brands – Marvin Sands Performing Arts Center
2 July 2010	Milwaukee	United States	Classic Rock Stage
3 July 2010	Merrillville	United States	Star Plaza Theatre
4 July 2010	Cincinnati	United States	A Taste of Blue Ash
~~6 July 2010~~	Clinton	United States	Lucky Star Casino
~~7 July 2010~~	Albuquerque	United States	Sandia Casino
9 July 2010	Los Angeles	United States	Greek Theatre
10 July 2010	Valley Center	United States	Harrah's Rincon-Open Sky Theater
11 July 2010	Saratoga Springs	United States	Mountain Winery
13 July 2010	Santa Rosa	United States	Wells Fargo Center for the Arts
15 July 2010	Snoqualmie	United States	Snoqualmie Casino Events Center
South America
17 November 2010	Caracas	Venezuela	Sambil
19 November 2010	Buenos Aires	Argentina	Luna Park
21 November 2010	Rosario	Argentina	Teatro Broadway
23 November 2010	Córdoba	Argentina	Superdomo Orfeo
25 November 2010	Santiago	Chile	Teatro Caupolicán
27 November 2010	Florianópolis	Brazil	Floripa Music Hall
28 November 2010	São Paulo	Brazil	HSBC Hall
1 December 2010	Asunción	Paraguay	Teatro BCP
3 December 2010	Buenos Aires	Argentina	Teatro Gran Rex
4 December 2010	Mendoza	Argentina	Auditorio Angel Bustelo

== Rite of Spring and Fly from Here Tours 2011–2012 ==
Oliver Wakeman on keyboards through May 2011; Geoff Downes took over from July 2011 onwards. Jon Davison took over on vocals for 2012 onwards.

Usually played songs:

- "Fly from Here, Part I: We Can Fly"
- "I've Seen All Good People"
- "Roundabout"
- "Tempus Fugit"
- "Yours Is No Disgrace"
- "Heart of the Sunrise"
- Fly from Here Overture - Part 5
- "Starship Trooper"
- "Wonderous Stories"
- "And You and I"

Sometimes played songs:

- "Owner of a Lonely Heart"
- "Into the Storm"
- "Solitare"
- "Life on a Film Set"
- "Awaken"
- "America"
- "Clap"
- "Leaves of Green"

Other:

- "To Be Over" (played on 13 November 2011)
- "Mood for a Day" (played on 15, 20, 24, 28 July 2012, 21 August 2012)
- "Machine Messiah" (played on 4 August 2011, 3, 5, 9, 12, 15, 17, 20, 23, 25 November 2011, 4 December 2012, 18 April 2012)

Cover:

- "Trambone" (played on 17 November 2011)
- "The Little Galliard" (played on 18 August 2012)
- "Ram" (played on 18 April 2012)
- "Provence" (played on 27 July 2012)
- "Laughing with Larry" (played on 17 April 2012)
- "Country Mix" (played on 29 July 2012)
- "Classical Guitar Mix" (played on 31 July 2012)
- "Australia" (played on 11 April 2012)
- "A Whiter Shade of Pale" (played on 29 July 2012)
- "The Valley of Rocks" (played on 24, 27 July 2012)
- "Sketches in the Sun" (played on 21 April 2012, 14 July 2012)
- "Intersection Blues" (played on 6 December 2011, 2 August 2012)
- "Cactus Boogie" (played on 25, 30 November 2011)
- "Cantata No. 140 (Wachet Auf)" (played on 7, 10, 14, 21 August 2012)
- "Second Initial" (played on 9 November 2011, 5, 19 April 2012, 21 July 2012, 7, 18 August 2012)
- "In the Course of the Day" (played on 16, 24 November 2011, 13 April 2012, 18, 25 July 2012, 4, 6, 14 August 2012)

Date	City	Country	Venue
U.S. "Rite of Spring" Tour
6 March 2011	Houston	United States	House of Blues
7 March 2011	Dallas	United States	House of Blues
9 March 2011	New Orleans	United States	House of Blues
11 March 2011	St. Petersburg	United States	Jannus Live
12 March 2011	Orlando	United States	WMMO Downtown Concerts
13 March 2011	Orlando	United States	WMMO Downtown Concerts
14 March 2011	Jacksonville	United States	Florida Theatre
15 March 2011	Fort Pierce	United States	Sunrise Theatre
18 March 2011	Chicago	United States	House of Blues
19 March 2011	Chicago	United States	House of Blues
20 March 2011	Grand Rapids	United States	Orbit Room
22 March 2011	Cleveland	United States	House of Blues
24 March 2011	Durham	United States	Durham Performing Arts Center
25 March 2011	Charlotte	United States	The Fillmore Charlotte
26 March 2011	Louisville	United States	Palace Theatre
29 March 2011	New Bedford	United States	Zeiterion Performing Arts Center
30 March 2011	Jim Thorpe	United States	Penn's Peak
1 April 2011	Hampton	United States	Hampton Beach Casino Ballroom
2 April 2011	Atlantic City	United States	Tropicana Casino & Resort
4 April 2011	Washington, D.C.	United States	Warner Theatre
Mexico Spring 2011 Tour
28 May 2011	Monterrey	Mexico	Arena Monterrey
30 May 2011	Mexico City	Mexico	Auditorio Nacional
U.S. "Fly from Here" Tour In support of the new studio album "Fly from Here" (double-billed with Styx as co-headliner)
4 July 2011	Camden	United States	Susquehanna Bank Center
5 July 2011	Holmdel	United States	PNC Bank Arts Center
7 July 2011	Canandaigua	United States	CMAC Performing Arts Center
8 July 2011	Mashantucket	United States	MGM Grand Theatre
9 July 2011	Gilford	United States	U.S. Cellular Pavilion
11 July 2011	Wantagh	United States	Nikon at Jones Beach Theater
12 July 2011	Bethel	United States	Bethel Woods Center for the Arts
14 July 2011	Alpharetta	United States	Verizon Wireless Amphitheatre
15 July 2011	Orange Beach	United States	Amphitheater at the Wharf
16 July 2011	Nashville	United States	Woods Amphitheater at Fontanel
18 July 2011	Kansas City	United States	Starlight Theatre
19 July 2011	Noblesville	United States	Verizon Wireless Music Center
20 July 2011	Clarkston	United States	DTE Energy Music Theatre
22 July 2011	Thackerville	United States	Global Events Center
23 July 2011	Oklahoma City	United States	Zoo Amphitheater
24 July 2011	Maryland Heights	United States	Verizon Wireless Amphitheatre
26 July 2011	Morrison	United States	Red Rocks Amphitheatre
28 July 2011	Boise	United States	Eagle River Pavilion
29 July 2011	Redmond	United States	Chateau Ste. Michelle Winery
30 July 2011	Goldendale	United States	Maryhill Winery
2 August 2011	Los Angeles	United States	Greek Theatre
3 August 2011	Mountain View	United States	Shoreline Amphitheatre
4 August 2011	San Diego	United States	Humphrey's Concerts ("An Evening with Yes") (without Styx)
Europe Autumn 2011 Tour (aborted)
3 November 2011	Lisbon	Portugal	Coliseu de Lisboa
4 November 2011	Madrid	Spain	La Riviera
5 November 2011	Barcelona	Spain	Sant Jordi Club
8 November 2011	Cambridge	England	Cambridge Corn Exchange
9 November 2011	Sheffield	England	Sheffield City Hall
11 November 2011	Birmingham	England	Birmingham Symphony Hall
12 November 2011	Glasgow	Scotland	Clyde Auditorium
13 November 2011	Manchester	England	Manchester Apollo
15 November 2011	Brighton	England	Brighton Dome
16 November 2011	Bristol	England	Colston Hall
17 November 2011	London	England	Hammersmith Apollo
19 November 2011	Paris	France	L'Olympia
20 November 2011	Brussels	Belgium	Ancienne Belgique
21 November 2011	Nijmegen	Netherlands	Vereeniging
23 November 2011	Zurich	Switzerland	Volkshaus
24 November 2011	Milan	Italy	Teatro Smeraldo
25 November 2011	Trieste	Italy	Palazzetti de Chiarbola
27 November 2011	Vienna	Austria	Koncerthaus
29 November 2011	Dresden	Germany (the Oberhausen show was cancelled and replaced by the show on 2 December in Nuremberg)	Kulturpalast
30 November 2011	Stuttgart	Germany (the Oberhausen show was cancelled and replaced by the show on 2 December in Nuremberg)	KKL Hegensaal
~~1 December 2011~~	Oberhausen (cancelled)	Germany (the Oberhausen show was cancelled and replaced by the show on 2 December in Nuremberg)	Konig-Pilsener Arena
2 December 2011	Nuremberg	Germany (the Oberhausen show was cancelled and replaced by the show on 2 December in Nuremberg)	Meistersinger Hall
3 December 2011	Munich	Germany (the Oberhausen show was cancelled and replaced by the show on 2 December in Nuremberg)	Tonhalle
4 December 2011	Bielefeld	Germany (the Oberhausen show was cancelled and replaced by the show on 2 December in Nuremberg)	Ringlokschuppen
6 December 2011	Copenhagen	Denmark	Amager Bio
7 December 2011	Oslo	Norway	Sentrum Scene
9 December 2011	Stockholm	Sweden	Solnahallen
~~11 December 2011~~	Helsinki (cancelled)	Finland	The Circus
~~12 December 2011~~	Tallinn (cancelled)	Estonia	Nokia Kontserdimaja
~~15 December 2011~~	Moscow (cancelled)	Russia	Crocus City Hall
Asia-Pacific Spring 2012 Tour Due to respiratory failure, lead singer Benoît David left Yes in early February 2012 and was immediately replaced by Jon Davison. Jon Davison made his live debut on stage two months later, starting from 1 April 2012.
1 April 2012	Auckland	New Zealand	Vector Arena
5 April 2012	Perth	Australia	Riverside Theatre
9 April 2012	Byron Bay	Australia	Byron Bay Bluesfest
11 April 2012	Melbourne	Australia	Palais Theatre
13 April 2012	Sydney	Australia	State Theatre
17 April 2012	Tokyo	Japan	Nihon Seinenkan
18 April 2012	Tokyo	Japan	Shibuya Kokaido
19 April 2012	Tokyo	Japan	Shibuya Kokaido
21 April 2012	Amagasaki	Japan	Archaic Hall
24 April 2012	Jakarta	Indonesia	The Ritz-Carlton
27 April 2012	Honolulu	United States	Blaisdell Concert Hall
29 April 2012	Kahului	United States	Maui Arts & Cultural Center
Summer 2012 Tour (With special guest Procol Harum)
10 July 2012	Rama	Canada	Casino Rama Entertainment Centre
13 July 2012	Atlantic City	United States	Tropicana Casino Resort
14 July 2012	Westbury	United States	Theatre at Westbury
15 July 2012	Englewood	United States	Bergen Performing Arts Center
17 July 2012	Lewiston	United States	Artpark Performing Arts Center
18 July 2012	Bethlehem	United States	Sands Bethlehem Event Center
20 July 2012	Upper Darby	United States	Tower Theatre
21 July 2012	Boston	United States	Bank of America Pavilion
22 July 2012	Morristown	United States	Mayo Performing Arts Center
24 July 2012	Munhall	United States	Carnegie Library Music Hall
25 July 2012	Raleigh	United States	Raleigh Amphitheater
27 July 2012	Boca Raton	United States	Mizner Park Amphitheatre
28 July 2012	St. Augustine	United States	St. Augustine Amphitheatre
29 July 2012	Clearwater	United States	Ruth Eckerd Hall
31 July 2012	Alpharetta	United States	Verizon Wireless Amphitheatre
2 August 2012	Myrtle Beach	United States	House of Blues
3 August 2012	Portsmouth	United States	nTELOS Wireless Pavilion
4 August 2012	Washington, D.C.	United States	Warner Theatre
6 August 2012	Clarkston	United States	DTE Energy Music Theatre
7 August 2012	Rosemont	United States	Akoo Theatre
9 August 2012	Denver	United States	Paramount Theatre
10 August 2012	Salt Lake City	United States	The Complex
12 August 2012	Snoqualmie	United States	Mountain View Plaza
14 August 2012	San Jose	United States	San Jose Civic Auditorium
15 August 2012	Universal City	United States	Gibson Amphitheatre
17 August 2012	Scottsdale	United States	Talking Stick Resort Ballroom
18 August 2012	San Diego	United States	Humphreys Concerts By the Bay
19 August 2012	Las Vegas	United States	Pearl Concert Theatre
21 August 2012	Mexico City	Mexico	Pepsi Center

== Three Album Tour 2013–2014 ==
During the Three Album Tour, Yes were playing three classic albums a night: The Yes Album, Close to the Edge and Going for the One in full. Only five shows performed in casinos (*) featured only two albums, The Yes Album and Close to the Edge (followed by "Roundabout" as the encore track), due to venue time restrictions. The two shows performed during the "Cruise to the Edge" festival also featured only two albums but not the same couple of albums and not the same encore track. It was announced on Billy Sherwood's Facebook page that a DVD of the Three Album Tour was being made and that Sherwood was mixing it. The resulting album, entitled Like It Is: Yes at the Bristol Hippodrome, included The Yes Album and Going for the One and excluded the Close to the Edge album.

Typical Set List

- Intro (Igor Stravinsky's "Firebird Suite")

Close to the Edge album:

- "Close to the Edge" (Anderson, Howe)
- "And You and I" (Anderson, Bowe, Bruford, Squire)
- "Siberian Khatru" (Anderson, Howe, Wakeman)

Going for the One album:

- "Going for the One" (Anderson)
- "Turn of the Century" (Anderson, Howe, White)
- "Parallels" (Squire)
- "Wonderous Stories" (Anderson)
- "Awaken" (Anderson, Howe)

The Yes Album:

- "Yours Is No Disgrace" (Anderson, Squire, Howe, Kaye, Bruford)
- "Clap" (Howe)
- "Starship Trooper" (Anderson, Howe, Squire)
- "I've Seen All Good People" (Anderson, Squire)
- "A Venture" (Anderson)
- "Perpetual Change" (Anderson, Squire)

Encore:

- "Roundabout" (Anderson, Howe)

Date	City	Country	Venue
U.S. Spring Tour 2013
1 March 2013	West Wendover*	United States	Peppermill Concert Hall*
3 March 2013	Seattle	United States	Moore Theatre
5 March 2013	San Francisco	United States	The Warfield
6 March 2013	Los Angeles	United States	Orpheum Theatre
8 March 2013	Temecula	United States	Pechanga Theater
9 March 2013	Reno*	United States	Silver Legacy Casino*
10 March 2013	Monterey	United States	Golden State Theatre
12 March 2013	Aspen	United States	Belly Up Aspen
14 March 2013	Omaha	United States	Holland Performing Arts Center
16 March 2013	Hammond	United States	The Venue at Horseshoe Casino
17 March 2013	Louisville	United States	Palace Theatre
18 March 2013	Kansas City	United States	The Midland by AMC
20 March 2013	Austin	United States	Moody Theater
21 March 2013	Grand Prairie	United States	Verizon Theatre
22 March 2013	Biloxi*	United States	Hard Rock Live *
24 March 2013	Hollywood*	United States	Seminole Hard Rock Live Arena*
26–27 March 2013	1st "Cruise to the Edge" Prog Rock Festival (aboard the MSC Poesia cruise ship): Fort Lauderdale → Georgetown → Ocho Rios → Fort Lauderdale (Note: Yes performed two shows at the "Cruise To The Edge" Festival: on Tuesday 26 February 2013, they played Close to the Edge and Going for the One in their entirety plus "Starship Trooper" as the encore track; on Wednesday 27 February 2013, they played Close To The Edge and The Yes Album in their entirety plus "Roundabout" as the encore track. On Friday 29 February 2013 (the day before the last day of the cruise), Yes did a "Storytellers" Q&A session in which the band members were supposed to answer questions from the audience and play several songs unplugged. At the conclusion of the discussion, Alan White, Chris Squire and Geoff Downes left the stage leaving only Steve Howe and Jon Davison playing a short acoustic set made of "The Ancient"/"Leaves of Green" and "Mood For A Day".)		
30 March 2013	Melbourne	United States	Maxwell C. King Center
2 April 2013	Clearwater	United States	Ruth Eckerd Hall
3 April 2013	Jacksonville	United States	Florida Theatre
5 April 2013	Mashantucket*	United States	MGM Grand at Foxwoods*
6 April 2013	Hampton	United States	Hampton Beach Casino Ballroom
7 April 2013	Bethlehem	United States	Sands Bethlehem Event Center
9 April 2013	New York City	United States	Beacon Theatre
11 April 2013	Toronto	Canada	Massey Hall
12 April 2013	Detroit	United States	Fox Theatre
South America Tour 2013
16 May 2013	Lima	Peru	Parque de la Exposición
17 May 2013	Lima	Peru	Parque de la Exposición
19 May 2013	Brasília	Brazil	Ginasio Nilson Nelson
21 May 2013	Curitiba	Brazil	Brazil Teatro Positivo
23 May 2013	São Paulo	Brazil	HSBC Hall
24 May 2013	São Paulo	Brazil	HSBC Hall
25 May 2013	Rio de Janeiro	Brazil	Vivo Rio
26 May 2013	Porto Alegre	Brazil	Auditório Araújo Vianna
28 May 2013	Santiago	Chile	Teatro Caupolican
30 May 2013	Buenos Aires	Argentina	Luna Park
U.S. & Canada Summer Tour 2013
6 July 2013	Paso Robles	United States	Vina Robles Amphitheatre
7 July 2013	Saratoga	United States	Mountain Winery
9 July 2013	Phoenix	United States	Celebrity Theatre
10 July 2013	Anaheim	United States	City National Grove of Anaheim
12 July 2013	Las Vegas	United States	Pearl Concert Theater
13 July 2013	Jackson	United States	Jackson Rancheria Casino Resort
14 July 2013	San Diego	United States	Humphreys Concerts by the Bay
14–17 July 2013	Las Vegas	United States	Rock 'n' Roll Fantasy Camp at MGM Grand Hotel & Casino
18 July 2013	Jackson	United States	Thalia Mara Hall
19 July 2013	Birmingham	United States	BJCC Concert Hall
20 July 2013	Huntsville	United States	Von Braun Concert Hall
21 July 2013	Atlanta	United States	Atlanta Symphony Hall
23 July 2013	Charlottesville	United States	nTelos Wireless Pavilion
24 July 2013	Washington, D.C.	United States	Warner Theatre
25 July 2013	Morristown	United States	Mayo Performing Arts Center
27 July 2013	Holyoke	United States	Mountain Park
28 July 2013	Port Chester	United States	Capitol Theatre
30 July 2013	Montreal	Canada	Place des Arts
31 July 2013	Westbury	United States	Theatre at Westbury
2 August 2013	Lincoln*	United States	Twin River Event Center*
3 August 2013	Camden	United States	(First-ever) Yestival – Susquehanna Bank Center
4 August 2013	Munhall	United States	Carnegie Music Hall
5 August 2013	Munhall	United States	Carnegie Music Hall
7 August 2013	Cleveland Heights	United States	Cain Park
8 August 2013	West Allis	United States	Wisconsin State Fair
9 August 2013	Prior Lake*	United States	Mystic Lake Casino*
10 August 2013	Mount Pleasant	United States	Soaring Eagle Casino & Resort
12 August 2013	Indianapolis	United States	Murat Theatre
13 August 2013	Cincinnati	United States	PNC Pavilion
14 August 2013	Rosemont	United States	Rosemont Theatre
U.S. & Canada Spring Tour 2014
19 March 2014	Victoria	Canada	Save-on-Foods Memorial Centre
20 March 2014	Vancouver	Canada	Queen Elizabeth Theatre
21 March 2014	Kelowna	Canada	Prospera Place
23 March 2014	Calgary	Canada	Southern Alberta Jubilee Auditorium
24 March 2014	Edmonton	Canada	Northern Alberta Jubilee Auditorium
26 March 2014	Winnipeg	Canada	Pantages Playhouse Theatre
29 March 2014	Oshawa	Canada	GM Centre
30 March 2014	Ottawa	Canada	Southam Hall
31 March 2014	Quebec City	Canada	Le Capitole de Québec
2 April 2014	Hamilton	Canada	Hamilton Place Theatre
4 April 2014	Atlantic City	United States	Borgata Events Center
5 April 2014	Bethlehem	United States	Sands Bethlehem Event Center
8–9 April 2014	2nd "Cruise To The Edge" Prog Rock Festival (aboard the MSC Divina cruise ship): Miami → Cozumel → Isla de Roatán, Honduras → Miami (Note: Yes performed two shows at the "Cruise To The Edge" Festival on Tuesday, 8 April 2014 & Wednesday, 9 April 2014. After the excerpt from the "Firebird Suite" played through the PA system, they played the same setlist both nights: "America", "Tempus Fugit", the entire Close to the Edge album, "Heart of the Sunrise", the entire The Yes Album plus "Roundabout" as the encore track.)		
Europe Spring Tour 2014
29 April 2014	Oxford	United Kingdom	Oxford New Theatre
30 April 2014	Southend-on-Sea	United Kingdom	Cliffs Pavilion
2 May 2014	Glasgow	United Kingdom	Clyde Auditorium
3 May 2014	Newcastle upon Tyne	United Kingdom	Newcastle City Hall
4 May 2014	Birmingham	United Kingdom	Birmingham Symphony Hall
6 May 2014	Leicester	United Kingdom	De Montfort Hall
7 May 2014	Sheffield	United Kingdom	Sheffield City Hall
8 May 2014	London	United Kingdom	Royal Albert Hall
10 May 2014	Manchester	United Kingdom	O2 Apollo Manchester
11 May 2014	Bristol	United Kingdom	Bristol Hippodrome
13 May 2014	Paris	France	Grand Rex
14 May 2014	Zurich	Switzerland	Volkshaus Zurich
16 May 2014	Monte-Carlo	Principality of Monaco	Opéra Garnier
17 May 2014	Padova	Italy	Palageox
18 May 2014	Milan	Italy	Teatre Della Luna
20 May 2014	Luxembourg	Luxembourg	Rockhal Club
21 May 2014	Brussels	Belgium	Acienne Belique
22 May 2014	Tilburg	Netherlands	013
26 May 2014	Mainz	Germany	Phoenixhalle
27 May 2014	Berlin	Germany	Admiralspalast
28 May 2014	Leipzig	Germany	Haus Auensee
30 May 2014	Prague	Czech Republic	Congress Centre
31 May 2014	Bratislava	Slovakia	NTC
2 June 2014	Warsaw	Poland	Sala Kongresowa
4 June 2014	Aarhus	Denmark	Train
5 June 2014	Oslo	Norway	Sentrum Scene

== Heaven & Earth Tour 2014–2015 ==
=== United States Summer tour 2014 ===
Every night of their Heaven & Earth U.S. Summer tour 2014, Yes are playing live material from the new studio album Heaven & Earth and performing in their entirety the two classic albums 1971's Fragile and 1972's Close to the Edge followed by an encore of their greatest hits.

Typical Set List from 5 July (in Nichols, New York) to 13 July 2014 (in Newport, Rhode Island) and from 18 July 2014 (in Salamanca, New York) to 24 August 2014 (in Los Angeles, California)

- Intro (Benjamin Britten's "Young Person's Guide to the Orchestra")

Close to the Edge album (played in reverse):

- "Siberian Khatru" (Anderson, Howe, Wakeman)
- "And You and I" (Anderson, Howe, Bruford, Squire)
- "Close to the Edge" (Anderson, Howe) (not played at the show on 5 July in Nichols, New York)

Songs from the Heaven & Earth album:

- "Believe Again" (Jon Davison, Howe) (not played at the show on 5 July in Nichols, New York) (only performed from 8 July in Boston, Massachusetts [first ever live performance] to 13 July and starting from 22 July in Rochester Hills, Michigan)
- "To Ascend" (Davison, White) (not played at the show on 5 July in Nichols, New York) (only performed on 6 July in Albany, New York [first ever live performance], from 18 to 20 July)
- "The Game" (Squire, Davison, Gerard Johnson) (not played at the show on 5 July in Nichols, New York) (only performed on 6 July in Albany, New York [first ever live performance], from 18 to 20 July and starting from 23 July in Northfield, Ohio)

Fragile album:

- "Roundabout" (Anderson, Howe)
- "Cans and Brahms" (Johannes Brahms, arr. by Wakeman)
- "We Have Heaven" (Anderson)
- "South Side of the Sky" (Anderson, Squire)
- "Five Per Cent for Nothing" (Bruford)
- "Long Distance Runaround" (Anderson)
- "The Fish (Schindleria Praematurus)" (Squire)
- "Mood for a Day" (Howe)
- "Heart of the Sunrise" (Anderson, Squire, Bruford)

The Yes Album Encore:

- "I've Seen All Good People" (Anderson, Squire) (exceptionally not played on 28 July in Nashville, Tennessee and on 23 August in Lincoln, California)

Greatest Hits Encore:

- "Owner of a Lonely Heart" (Rabin, Anderson, Squire, Horn) (only performed on 13 July in Newport, Rhode Island, on 18 July in Salamanca, New York, on 20 July in Munhall, Pennsylvania, on 23 July in Northfield, Ohio, on 25 July in Madison, Wisconsin, on 28 July in Nashville, Tennessee, on 30 July in Atlanta, Georgia, on 1 August in Hollywood, Florida, on 3 August in Orlando, Florida, on 6 August in Grand Prairie, Texas, on 9 August in Denver, Colorado, on 11 August in Tucson, Arizona, on 12 August in Mesa, Arizona, on 13 August in Albuquerque, New Mexico, on 15 August in Las Vegas, Nevada, on 16 August in Anaheim, California, on 19 August in San Jose, California, on 22 August in Grand Ronde, Oregon, on 24 August in Los Angeles, California)
- "Starship Trooper" (Anderson, Howe, Squire) (only performed on 19 July in Philadelphia, Pennsylvania, on 22 July in Rochester Hills, Michigan, on 26 July in Chicago, Illinois, on 28 July in Nashville, Tennessee, on 29 July in Louisville, Kentucky, on 2 August in St. Petersburg, Florida, on 5 August in Houston, Texas, on 7 August in Kansas City, Missouri, on 12 August in Mesa, Arizona, on 18 August in San Diego, California, on 21 August in Tulalip Bay, Washington)

Typical Set List on 15 July (in Washington, D.C.) and 16 July 2014 (in Hampton, New Hampshire)

- Intro (Benjamin Britten's "Young Person's Guide to the Orchestra")

Fragile album:

- "Roundabout" (Anderson, Howe)
- "Cans and Brahms" (Brahms, arr. by Wakeman)
- "We Have Heaven" (Anderson)
- "South Side of the Sky" (Anderson, Squire)
- "Five Per Cent for Nothing" (Bruford)
- "Long Distance Runaround" (Anderson)
- "The Fish (Schindleria Praematurus)" (Squire)
- "Mood for a Day" (Howe)
- "Heart of the Sunrise" (Anderson, Squire, Bruford)

Songs from the Heaven & Earth album:

- "To Ascend" (Davison, White)
- "The Game" (Squire, Davison, Johnson)

Close to the Edge album (played in reverse except on 16 July in Hampton, New Hampshire where it was played in order):

- "Siberian Khatru" (Anderson, Howe, Wakeman)
- "And You and I" (Anderson, Howe, Bruford, Squire)
- "Close to the Edge" (Anderson, Howe)

The Yes Album Encore:

- "I've Seen All Good People" (Anderson, Squire)
- "Starship Trooper" (Anderson, Squire)

Date	City	Country	Venue
U.S. Summer Tour 2014
5 July 2014	Nichols	United States	Tioga Downs Casino & Racing
6 July 2014	Albany	United States	Hart Theatre
8 July 2014	Boston	United States	Leader Bank Pavilion
9 July 2014	New York City	United States	Radio City Music Hall
11 July 2014	Wallingford	United States	Toyota Oakdale Theatre
12 July 2014	Westbury	United States	NYCB Theatre at Westbury
13 July 2014	Newport	United States	Newport Yachting Center
15 July 2014	Washington, D.C.	United States	Warner Theatre
16 July 2014	Hampton	United States	Hampton Beach Casino Ballroom
18 July 2014	Salamanca	United States	Seneca Allegany Casino
19 July 2014	Philadelphia	United States	Tower Theater
20 July 2014	Munhall	United States	Carnegie Music Hall
22 July 2014	Rochester Hills	United States	Meadow Brook
23 July 2014	Northfield	United States	Hard Rock Live Northfield Park
25 July 2014	Madison	United States	Overture Hall
26 July 2014	Chicago	United States	Copernicus Center
28 July 2014	Nashville	United States	Ryman Auditorium
29 July 2014	Louisville	United States	Louisville Palace
30 July 2014	Atlanta	United States	Atlanta Symphony Hall
1 August 2014	Hollywood	United States	Seminole Hard Rock Live
2 August 2014	St. Petersburg	United States	Mahaffey Theater
3 August 2014	Orlando	United States	Bob Carr Performing Arts Centre
5 August 2014	Houston	United States	Bayou Music Center
6 August 2014	Grand Prairie	United States	Verizon Theatre
7 August 2014	Kansas City	United States	Arvest Bank Theatre
9 August 2014	Denver	United States	Paramount Theatre
11 August 2014	Tucson	United States	Rialto Theatre
12 August 2014	Mesa	United States	Ikeda Theater
13 August 2014	Albuquerque	United States	Legends Theater
15 August 2014	Las Vegas	United States	The Joint
16 August 2014	Anaheim	United States	City National Grove of Anaheim
18 August 2014	San Diego	United States	Humphrey's Concerts By the Bay
19 August 2014	San Jose	United States	City National Civic
21 August 2014	Tulalip Bay	United States	Tulalip Amphitheatre
22 August 2014	Grand Ronde	United States	Spirit Mountain Casino
23 August 2014	Lincoln	United States	Thunder Valley Casino Resort
24 August 2014	Los Angeles	United States	The Greek Theatre

=== Australia & New Zealand Fall tour 2014 ===
Every night of their Heaven & Earth Australia & New Zealand Fall tour 2014, Yes will perform in their entirety the two classic albums 1971's Fragile and 1972's Close to the Edge and will play excerpts from the new studio album Heaven & Earth plus some of their Greatest Hits.

Typical Set List starting from 10 November 2014 (in Auckland, New Zealand)

- Intro (Benjamin Britten's "Young Person's Guide to the Orchestra")

Close to the Edge album (played in order):

- "Close to the Edge" (Anderson, Howe)
- "And You and I" (Anderson, Howe, Bruford, Squire)
- "Siberian Khatru" (Anderson, Howe, Wakeman)

Songs from the Heaven & Earth album:

- "Believe Again" (Davison, Howe)
- "The Game" (Davison, Squire, Johnson)

Fragile album:

- "Roundabout"
- "Cans and Brahms"
- "We Have Heaven"
- "South Side of the Sky"
- "Five Per Cent for Nothing"
- "Long Distance Runaround"
- "The Fish (Schindleria Praematurus)"
- "Mood for a Day"
- "Heart of the Sunrise"

The Yes Album Encore:

- "I've Seen All Good People"

Greatest Hits Encore:

- "Owner of a Lonely Heart"

Date	City	Country	Venue
Australia & New Zealand Fall Tour 2014
10 November 2014	Auckland	New Zealand	Aotea Centre – ASB Theatre
12 November 2014	Perth	Australia	Crown Theatre
14 November 2014	Gold Coast	Australia	Jupiters Gold Coast
15 November 2014	Sydney	Australia	State Theatre
16 November 2014	Sydney	Australia	State Theatre
18 November 2014	Melbourne	Australia	Palais Theatre

=== Japan Fall tour 2014 ===
After the Australia & New Zealand tour, Yes had embarked in November 2014 on a tour of Japan, still playing the Fragile and Close To The Edge albums in their entirety plus some greatest hits and songs from their new album Heaven & Earth. The show on 29 November 2014 in Tokyo would become the band's final performance with Chris Squire before his death the following summer on 27 June 2015.

Date	City	Country	Venue
Japan Fall Tour 2014
23 November 2014	Tokyo	Japan	Tokyo Dome City Hall
24 November 2014	Tokyo	Japan	Tokyo Dome City Hall
25 November 2014	Tokyo	Japan	Tokyo Dome City Hall
27 November 2014	Osaka	Japan	Orix Theater
28 November 2014	Nagoya	Japan	Zepp Nagoya
29 November 2014	Tokyo	Japan	NHK Hall

== North American Tours 2015 ==
=== North American Summer Tour 2015 ===
On 6 April 2015, Yes and Toto announced that they would embark in Summer 2015 on a joint tour of North America.

On 19 May 2015, Yes announced that Chris Squire was suffering from acute erythroid leukemia and that, due to this, former member Billy Sherwood would be covering Squire's role in the band on (previously announced) live dates in 2015, i.e. their North American Summer 2015 joint tour with Toto from August to September 2015, as well as their performances on the latest "Cruise to the Edge" festival in November 2015. Squire subsequently died on 27 June 2015. Their Mashantucket, Connecticut, show on 7 August 2015 was the first time in the history of Yes that the band would perform without Squire, 47 years since the band's creation.

Typical Set List

- "Onward" (Squire) (studio track from the Tormato album played through the PA system and projected onto a video screen as a video tribute to late Chris Squire)
- "Firebird Suite" (Excerpt) (Stravinsky) (tape played through the PA system)
- "Don't Kill the Whale" (Anderson, Squire)
- "Tempus Fugit" (Downes, Horn, Howe, Squire, White)
- "America" (Simon) (Simon & Garfunkel cover)
- "Going for the One" (Anderson)
- "Time and a Word" (Anderson, Foster)
- "Clap" (Howe) (not played on 23 August 2015; dropped from the set after the show on 25 August 2015)
- "I've Seen All Good People" (Anderson, Squire)
- "Siberian Khatru" (Anderson, Howe, Wakeman)
- "Owner of a Lonely Heart" (Rabin, Anderson, Squire, Horn)
- "Roundabout" (Anderson, Howe)

Encore:

- "Starship Trooper" (Anderson, Howe, Squire)

Other:

- "Nine Voices (Longwalker)" (played on 11 August 2015)

Date	City	Country	Venue
North American Summer Tour (with Toto) – 7 August to 12 September 2015
7 August 2015	Mashantucket	United States	Grand Theater At Foxwoods
8 August 2015	Newark	United States	Prudential Hall
9 August 2015	Atlantic City	United States	Borgata Events Center
11 August 2015	New York City	United States	Barclays Center
12 August 2015	Baltimore	United States	Pier Six Concert Pavilion
14 August 2015	Dayton	United States	Rose Music Center
15 August 2015	Sterling Heights	United States	Freedom Hill Amphitheatre
16 August 2015	Chicago	United States	FirstMerit Bank Pavilion
18 August 2015	Des Moines	United States	Iowa State Fairgrounds
19 August 2015	St. Charles	United States	Family Arena
21 August 2015	Biloxi	United States	Beau Rivage Theatre
22 August 2015	Alpharetta	United States	Verizon Wireless Amphitheatre
23 August 2015	Clearwater	United States	Ruth Eckerd Hall
25 August 2015	The Woodlands	United States	Cynthia Woods Mitchell Pavilion
26 August 2015	San Antonio	United States	Majestic Theatre
27 August 2015	Grand Prairie	United States	Verizon Theatre
28 August 2015	El Paso	United States	Cohen Stadium
30 August 2015	Littleton	United States	Denver Botanic Gardens
31 August 2015	Salt Lake City	United States	Red Butte Garden
2 September 2015	Tucson	United States	Anselmo Valencia Tori Amphitheatre
4 September 2015	Scottsdale	United States	The Pool
5 September 2015	Pala	United States	Starlight Theater
6 September 2015	Los Angeles	United States	Greek Theatre
8 September 2015	Saratoga	United States	Mountain Winery
10 September 2015	Shelton	United States	Little Creek Casino Resort
11 September 2015	Airway Heights	United States	Northern Quest Resort & Casino
12 September 2015	Coquitlam	Canada	Hard Rock Casino Vancouver
14 September 2015	Rocky View County	Canada	Grey Eagle Resort & Casino (without Toto)

=== North American Fall Tour 2015 ===
Typical Set List

- "Onward" (Squire) (studio track from the Tormato album played through the PA system and projected onto a video screen as a video tribute to late Chris Squire)
- "Firebird Suite" (excerpt) (Stravinsky) (tape played through the PA system)
- "Siberian Khatru" (Anderson, Howe, Wakeman)
- "Believe Again" (Davison, Howe)
- "Going for the One" (Anderson)
- "White Car" (Downes, Horn, Howe, Squire, White)
- "Tempus Fugit" (Downes, Horn, Howe, Squire, White)
- "America" (Simon) (Simon & Garfunkel cover)
- "Nine Voices" (Anderson, Howe, Sherwood, Squire, White, Khoroshev)
- "Time and a Word" (Anderson, Foster)
- "Clap" (Howe)
- "Don't Kill the Whale" (Anderson, Squire)
- "Soon" (Anderson, Squire, Howe, White, Moraz) (closing section of "The Gates of Delirium")
- "I've Seen All Good People" (Anderson, Squire)
- "Owner of a Lonely Heart" (Rabin, Anderson, Squire, Horn)
- "Roundabout" (Anderson, Howe)

Encore:

- "Starship Trooper" (Anderson, Howe, Squire)

Date	City	Country	Venue
North American Fall Tour – 11 to 19 November 2015
11 November 2015	Sarasota	United States	Van Wezel Performing Arts Hall
12 November 2015	Melbourne	United States	The King Center for the Performing Arts
13 November 2015	Fort Lauderdale	United States	Au-Rene Theater
15–16 November 2015	Yes headlining the 3rd "Cruise To The Edge" Prog Rock Festival (aboard the Norwegian Cruise Line's Norwegian Pearl cruise ship): Miami → Key West → "a pristine Private Island in the Bahamas"		

== Albums Tour 2016–2017 ==
=== UK & European Spring Tour 2016 ===
Yes have advertised this leg of the tour as featuring their albums Fragile (1971) & Drama (1980) played in their entirety. A selection of their greatest hits complete these two albums. Trevor Horn joined the band on stage to sing lead vocal on the 'Drama' song "Tempus Fugit" for their Oxford and London dates.

Typical Set List

Set #1:

- Intro ("Onward" studio version played through the PA system)

Drama album:

- "Machine Messiah" (Downes, Horn, Howe, Squire, White)
- "Man in a White Car" (Downes, Horn, Howe, Squire, White)
- "Does It Really Happen" (Downes, Horn, Howe, Squire, White)
- "Into the Lens" (Downes, Horn, Howe, Squire, White)
- "Run Through the Light" (Downes, Horn, Howe, Squire, White)
- "Tempus Fugit" (Downes, Horn, Howe, Squire, White)

Encore:

- "Time and a Word"
- "Siberian Khatru"

Intermission

Set #2:

- "Don't Kill the Whale" (Anderson, Squire) (from 4 May 2016 to 7 May 2016; starting from 13 May 2016)
- "Going for the One" (Anderson, Howe, Squire, White, Wakeman) (only on 9 May 2016 replacing "Don't Kill the Whale" )
- "Soon" (Anderson, Squire, Howe, White, Moraz) (only on 10 May 2016 replacing "Going for the One")
- "Owner of a Lonely Heart" (Rabin, Anderson, Squire, Horn) (starting from 4 May 2016)

Fragile album:

- "Roundabout" (Anderson, Howe)
- "Cans and Brahms" (Johannes Brahms, arr. by Wakeman)
- "We Have Heaven" (Anderson)
- "South Side of the Sky" (Anderson, Squire)
- "Five Per Cent for Nothing" (Bruford)
- "Long Distance Runaround" (Anderson)
- "The Fish (Schindleria Praematurus)" (Squire)
- "Mood for a Day" (Howe)
- "Heart of the Sunrise" (Anderson, Squire, Bruford)

Encore:

- "Don't Kill the Whale" (Anderson, Squire) (from 27 April 2016 to 3 May 2016)
- "Owner of a Lonely Heart" (Rabin, Anderson, Squire, Horn) (from 27 April 2016 to 3 May 2016)
- "Starship Trooper" (Anderson, Howe, Squire)

Date	City	Country	Venue
UK & European Spring Tour 2016
27 April 2016	Glasgow	Scotland	Glasgow Royal Concert Hall
29 April 2016	Newcastle upon Tyne	England	Newcastle City Hall
30 April 2016	Manchester	England	O2 Apollo Manchester
2 May 2016	Liverpool	England	Philharmonic Hall, Liverpool
3 May 2016	Sheffield	England	Sheffield City Hall
4 May 2016	Bristol	England	Colston Hall
6 May 2016	Birmingham	England	Symphony Hall, Birmingham
7 May 2016	Brighton	England	Brighton Centre
9 May 2016	Oxford	England	New Theatre Oxford
10 May 2016	London	England	Royal Albert Hall
13 May 2016	Paris	France	L'Olympia
14 May 2016	Brussels	Belgium	Ancienne Belgique
15 May 2016	Utrecht	Netherlands	TivoliVredenburg
17 May 2016	Hamburg	Germany	Mehr! Theater am Großmarkt
19 May 2016	Frankfurt	Germany	Alte Oper
20 May 2016	Leipzig	Germany	Haus Auensee
21 May 2016	Berlin	Germany	Admiralspalast
23 May 2016	Bonn	Germany	Beethovenhalle
24 May 2016	Stuttgart	Germany	Kultur- und Kongresszentrum Liederhalle
25 May 2016	Munich	Germany	Circus Krone
27 May 2016	Zürich	Switzerland	Volkshaus
28 May 2016	Milan	Italy	Teatro Nazionale
29 May 2016	Padova	Italy	Gran Teatro Geox
31 May 2016	Florence	Italy	Obihall
1 June 2016	Rome	Italy	Teatro Olimpico
~~2 June 2016~~	Bari	Italy	Teatro Petruzzelli (Note: Concert on 2 June 2016 in Bari, Italy no longer announced.)

=== US Summer Tour 2016 ===
Yes have advertised this leg of the tour as featuring their albums Drama (1980) and sides 1 & 4 ("The Revealing Science of God" and "Ritual") of Tales from Topographic Oceans (1973) played in their entirety along with a selection of their greatest hits.

Having undergone surgery to repair his back, Yes drummer Alan White was not able to rejoin Yes's US Summer Tour 2016. As a result, his «good friend» United States drummer Jay Schellen (from Hurricane, Asia and GPS) started performing with the band, replacing him on drums during the Summer tour.

Typical Set List

Set #1:

- Intro (Benjamin Britten's "Young Person's Guide to the Orchestra" played through the PA system)

Drama album:

- "Machine Messiah" (Downes, Horn, Howe, Squire, White)
- "Man in a White Car" (Downes, Horn, Howe, Squire, White)
- "Does It Really Happen" (Downes, Horn, Howe, Squire, White)
- "Into the Lens" (Downes, Horn, Howe, Squire, White)
- "Run Through the Light" (Downes, Horn, Howe, Squire, White)
- "Tempus Fugit" (Downes, Horn, Howe, Squire, White)
- "Time and a Word"
- "Siberian Khatru"

Set #2:

- "And You and I"
- "The Revealing Science of God (Dance of the Dawn)" (TFTO Side 1)
- "Leaves of Green" (excerpt from "The Ancient (Giants Under the Sun)" (TFTO Side 3)
- "Ritual (Nous Sommes du Soleil)" (TFTO Side 4)

Encore:

- "Roundabout"
- "Starship Trooper" (Anderson, Howe, Squire)

Date	City	Country	Venue
US Summer Tour 2016
25 July 2016	Lancaster	United States	American Music Theater
27 July 2016	Columbus	United States	Celeste Center
28 July 2016	Northfield, Ohio	United States	Hard Rock Live
30 July 2016	Atlantic City	United States	Tropicana Casino & Resort Atlantic City
31 July 2016	Bethlehem	United States	Sands Event Center
2 August 2016	Lewiston	United States	Artpark
4 August 2016	Lynn	United States	Lynn Auditorium
5 August 2016	Wallingford	United States	Toyota Oakdale Theatre
6 August 2016	Westbury	United States	NYCB Theatre
9 August 2016	Staten Island	United States	St. George Theatre
10 August 2016	Englewood	United States	Bergen Performing Arts Center
12 August 2016	Port Chester	United States	Capitol Theatre
13 August 2016	Morristown	United States	Mayo Performing Arts Center
14 August 2016	Albany	United States	The Egg
16 August 2016	Washington, D.C.	United States	Warner Theatre
17 August 2016	Munhall	United States	Carnegie Music Hall
19 August 2016	Sterling Heights	United States	Freedom Hill Amphitheatre
20 August 2016	Chicago	United States	Copernicus Center
21 August 2016	Milwaukee	United States	Riverside Theater
24 August 2016	Denver	United States	Paramount Theatre
26 August 2016	Anaheim	United States	City National Grove of Anaheim
27 August 2016	Las Vegas	United States	Downtown Event Center
28 August 2016	Santa Barbara	United States	Arlington Theater
30 August 2016	Los Angeles	United States	Orpheum Theatre
31 August 2016	Saratoga	United States	Mountain Winery
2 September 2016	Reno	United States	Silver Legacy Reno
3 September 2016	Paso Robles	United States	Vina Robles Winery
4 September 2016	San Diego	United States	Golden Hall

=== Japan Fall Tour 2016 ===
In September 2016, Yes announced a 6-date Japanese Tour for November 2016, playing Yessongs (1973) and sides 1 & 4 of Tales from Topographic Oceans (1973). On 14 October 2016, Yes announced that Alan White would rejoin the band for the November 2016 Japan Tour & the February 2017 "Cruise to the Edge" Prog Rock Festival.

Setlist: Set 1a (Selections from "Drama"):

- "Machine Messiah"
- "White Car"
- "Tempus Fugit"

Set 1b (Selections from "Yessongs"):

- "I've Seen All Good People"
- "Perpetual Change"
- "And You and I"
- "Heart of the Sunrise"

Set 2 (Selections from "Tales From Topographic Oceans"):

- "The Revealing Science of God (Dance of the Dawn)"
- "Leaves of Green"
- "Ritual (Nous sommes du soleli)"

Encore:

- "Roundabout"
- "Starship Trooper"

Date	City	Country	Venue
Japan Fall Tour 2016
21 November 2016	Tokyo	Japan	Orchard Hall
22 November 2016	Tokyo	Japan	Orchard Hall
24 November 2016	Osaka	Japan	Orix Theater
25 November 2016	Nagoya	Japan	Zepp Nagoya
28 November 2016	Tokyo	Japan	Orchard Hall
29 November 2016	Tokyo	Japan	Orchard Hall

=== US Summer Tour 2017 ===
Setlist is same as above but with some differences

Set 1 (Drama):

- "Machine Messiah"
- "White Car"
- "Does It Really Happen?"
- "Into the Lens"
- "Run Through the Light"
- "Tempus Fugit"
- "And You and I" (omitted on 8, 17 February 2017)
- "Perpetual Change" (played on 11, 14, 18 February 2017)
- "Heart of the Sunrise" (played on 3, 12, 15, 19 February 2017)

Set 2:

- "The Revealing Science of God (Dance of the Dawn)"
- "Leaves of Green"
- "Ritual (Nous sommes du soleli)"

Encore:

- "Roundabout"
- "Starship Trooper" (played on 7, 8, 11, 12, 14, 15, 18, 19 February 2017)
- "Heat of the Moment" (In memory of John Wetton) (played on 8, 11, 12, 14, 15, 18, 19 February 2017)

Date	City	Country	Venue
North American Winter Tour 2017
3 February 2017	Cherokee	United States	Harrah's Cherokee – Event Center
7–11 February 2017	Yes headlining the 4th "Cruise to the Edge" Prog Rock Festival (aboard the RCCL Brilliance of the Seas cruise ship): Tampa → Cozumel → Tampa		
11 February 2017	St. Petersburg	United States	Mahaffey Theater
12 February 2017	Pompano Beach	United States	Pompano Beach Amphitheatre
14 February 2017	Atlanta	United States	Atlanta Symphony Hall
15 February 2017	Jacksonville	United States	Florida Theatre
17 February 2017	Biloxi	United States	IP Casino Resort Spa
18 February 2017	Shreveport	United States	Strand Theatre
19 February 2017	Dallas	United States	Majestic Theatre
20 February 2017	Midland	United States	Wagner Noël Performing Arts Center

== Yes's North American "Yestival" (Summer) Tour 2017 ==
The tour featured Steve Howe's son Dylan as second drummer; On 11 September 2017, the band announced that due to the unexpected death of Virgil Howe, Steve's son and Dylan's brother, the rest of the tour, including their concert at Moorhead the same day, were cancelled.

Typical Set List

- Intro ("Young Person's Guide To The Orchestra")
- "Survival" (Anderson)
- "Time and a Word" (Anderson, Foster)
- "Yours Is No Disgrace" (Anderson, Squire, Howe, Kaye, Bruford)
- "South Side of the Sky" (Anderson, Squire)
- "And You and I" (Anderson, Howe, Squire, Bruford)
- "Leaves of Green" (excerpt from "The Ancient") (Anderson, Squire, Howe, Wakeman, White)
- "Soon" (closing section of "The Gates of Delirium") (Anderson, Squire, Howe, White, Moraz)
- "Going for the One" (Anderson, Howe, Squire, White, Wakeman)
- "Don't Kill the Whale" (Anderson, Squire)
- "Machine Messiah" (Downes, Horn, Howe, Squire, White)

Encore:

- "Madrigal" (Anderson, Wakeman) (omitted on 4, 7, 8, 23, 26 August 2017)
- "Roundabout" (Anderson, Howe)
- "Starship Trooper" (Anderson, Howe, Squire) (played on 5, 7, 10, 28 August 2018, 1, 5, 7, 8 September 2017)

Date	City	Country	Venue
North American "Yestival" Summer Tour 2017
4 August 2017	Greensboro	United States	White Oak Amphitheatre
5 August 2017	Boone	United States	Holmes Convocation Center
7 August 2017	Baltimore	United States	Pier Six Concert Pavilion
8 August 2017	Upper Darby	United States	Tower Theatre
10 August 2017	Mashantucket	United States	The Grand Theater at Foxwoods Resort Casino
11 August 2017	Brooklyn	United States	Ford Amphitheater
12 August 2017	Holmdel	United States	PNC Bank Arts Center
14 August 2017	Hershey	United States	Hershey Theatre
16 August 2017	Greensburg	United States	The Palace Theatre
17 August 2017	Clarkston	United States	DTE Energy Music Theatre
19 August 2017	Elgin	United States	Festival Park – Grand Victoria Casino
20 August 2017	Cleveland	United States	Jacobs Pavilion
22 August 2017	Oklahoma City	United States	Zoo Amphitheatre
23 August 2017	Sugar Land	United States	Smart Financial Centre
25 August 2017	Phoenix	United States	Celebrity Theatre
26 August 2017	Las Vegas	United States	The Joint @ Hard Rock Hotel and Casino
28 August 2017	San Diego	United States	Balboa Theatre
29 August 2017	Los Angeles	United States	Microsoft Theater
31 August 2017	Reno	United States	Grand Sierra Resort
1 September 2017	San Francisco	United States	Warfield Theatre
3 September 2017	Quil Ceda Village	United States	Tulalip Amphitheatre
5 September 2017	Vancouver	Canada	Queen Elizabeth Theatre
7 September 2017	Edmonton	Canada	Northern Alberta Jubilee Auditorium
8 September 2017	Calgary	Canada	Southern Alberta Jubilee Auditorium
~~11 September 2017~~	~~Moorehead~~	~~United States~~	~~Bluestem Center for the Arts Amphitheatre~~
~~12 September 2017~~	~~Cedar Rapids~~	~~United States~~	~~McGrath Amphitheatre~~
~~14 September 2017~~	~~London~~	~~Canada~~	~~Budweiser Gardens~~
~~15 September 2017~~	~~Rochester~~	~~United States~~	~~Roc Dome Arena~~
~~17 September 2017~~	~~Boston~~	~~United States~~	~~Roc Dome Arena The Wilbur Theatre~~
~~18 September 2017~~	~~Huntington~~	~~United States~~	~~The Paramount~~
~~19 September 2017~~	~~Huntington~~	~~United States~~	~~The Paramount~~

About the cancellation of the Yestival tour remaining dates: (Note: On 11 September 2017, the band announced that due to the unexpected death of Virgil Howe, son of Steve Howe and brother of Dylan Howe (who acted as second drummer for the tour), the rest of the "Yestival" tour had been cancelled.)

== Yes's Cruise to the Edge 2018 ==
Date	City	Country	Venue
Cruise to the Edge 2018
3–9 February 2018	Yes headlining the 5th "Cruise to the Edge" Prog Rock Festival (sailing from Tampa to Belize & Costa Maya)		

== Yes's UK, Europe, and North America "50th Anniversary" Spring/Summer Tour 2018 ==
Typical Set List

European Leg

Set #1:

- Intro (Excerpt from Stravinsky's Firebird Suite)
- "Yours Is No Disgrace" (Anderson, Howe, Squire, Bruford, Kaye)
- "I've Seen All Good People" (Anderson, Squire)
- "Sweet Dreams" (Anderson, Foster)
- "South Side of the Sky" (Anderson, Squire) (omitted on 25 March 2018)
- "Onward" (Squire) (omitted on 18, 30 March 2018)
- "Clap" (played on 20–23 March 2018)
- "Mood for a Day" (Howe) (Occasionally replaced by or played in conjunction with "Clap")
- "Wonderous Stories" (Anderson)
- "Parallels" (Squire)
- "And You and I" (Anderson, Squire, Howe, Bruford)

Set #2:

- "The Revealing Science of God (Dance of the Dawn)" (credited to Yes)
- "Leaves of Green" (excerpt from "The Ancient") (Yes)
- "Ritual (Nous sommes du soleil)" (Yes)

Encore:

- "Roundabout" (Anderson, Howe, Squire)
- "Starship Trooper" (Anderson, Squire)

American Leg

Set #1:

- "Close to the Edge" (Anderson, Howe)
- "Nine Voices (Longwalker)" (Anderson, Howe, Sherwood, Squire, White, Khoroshev)
- "Parallels" (Squire)
- "Second Initial" (played on 21–28 July 2018)
- "Madrigal" (played on 21–28 July 2018)
- "Mood for a Day" (Howe)
- "Leaves of Green" (excerpt from "The Ancient") (Yes)
- "Fly from Here, Part I: We Can Fly" (Horn, Downes, Squire)
- "Sweet Dreams" (Anderson, Foster)
- "Heart of the Sunrise" (Anderson, Squire, Bruford)

Set #2:

- "Perpetual Change" (Anderson, Squire)
- "Does It Really Happen?" (Downes, Horn, Howe, Squire, White)
- "Soon" (excerpt from "The Gates of Delirium") (credited to Yes)
- "Believe Again" (played on 5, 6 June 2018)
- "Awaken" (Anderson, Howe)

Encore:

- "Yours Is No Disgrace" (Anderson, Howe, Squire, Bruford, Kaye)
- "Roundabout" (Anderson, Howe, Squire)
- "Starship Trooper" (Anderson, Squire)

Date	City	Country	Venue
UK & Europe "50th anniversary" Spring Tour 2018
13 March 2018	Bristol	England	Colston Hall
14 March 2018	Sheffield	England	Sheffield City Hall
16 March 2018	Glasgow	Scotland	SEC Armadillo
17 March 2018	Manchester	England	Bridgewater Hall
18 March 2018	Gateshead	England	Sage Gateshead
20 March 2018	Birmingham	England	Symphony Hall, Birmingham
21 March 2018	Brighton	England	Brighton Centre
23 March 2018	Liverpool	England	Philharmonic Hall, Liverpool
24 March 2018	London	England	London Palladium
25 March 2018	London	England	London Palladium
27 March 2018	Tilburg	Netherlands	013
28 March 2018	Antwerp	Belgium	De Roma
30 March 2018	Paris	France	L'Olympia
North America
5 June 2018	St. Charles	United States	Arcada Theater Building
6 June 2018	St. Charles	United States	Arcada Theater Building
8 June 2018	New Buffalo	United States	Four Winds Casino
10 June 2018	Kansas City	United States	Midland Theatre
11 June 2018	Denver	United States	Paramount Theatre
13 June 2018	Boise	United States	CenturyLink Arena
14 June 2018	Woodinville	United States	Chateau Ste. Michelle
16 June 2018	Bakersfield	United States	Spectrum Amphitheatre
17 June 2018	Anaheim	United States	City National Grove of Anaheim
19 June 2018	Los Angeles	United States	Ford Theatre
20 June 2018	San Jose	United States	City National Civic
22 June 2018	West Wendover	United States	Peppermill Concert Hall
23 June 2018	Laughlin	United States	E Center at Edgewater Hotel Casino
24 June 2018	Temecula	United States	Pechanga Resort & Casino
28 June 2018	Interlochen	United States	Kresge Auditorium
29 June 2018	Grand Rapids	United States	20 Monroe Live
30 June 2018	Detroit	United States	Fox Theatre
2 July 2018	Cincinnati	United States	PNC Pavilion
5 July 2018	Munhall	United States	Carnegie of Homestead Music Hall
6 July 2018	Jim Thorpe	United States	Penn's Peak
7 July 2018	Montclair	United States	The Wellmont Theater
10 July 2018	Boston	United States	Wilbur Theatre
11 July 2018	Hampton Beach	United States	Hampton Beach Casino Ballroom
13 July 2018	Mashantucket	United States	Foxwoods Resort Casino
14 July 2018	Atlantic City	United States	Tropicana Casino & Resort
15 July 2018	New York City	United States	St. George Theatre
17 July 2018	Peekskill	United States	Paramount Hudson Valley
18 July 2018	Wesbury	United States	Theatre at Westbury
20 July 2018	Philadelphia	United States	The Fillmore Philadelphia
21 July 2018	Philadelphia	United States	The Fillmore Philadelphia
23 July 2018	Washington, D.C.	United States	Warner Theatre
24 July 2018	Richmond	United States	Classic Amphitheater
26 July 2018	Clearwater	United States	Capitol Theatre
27 July 2018	Orlando	United States	The Plaza Live
28 July 2018	Atlanta	United States	Atlanta Symphony Hall

== Yes Featuring Jon Anderson, Trevor Rabin, Rick Wakeman's Quintessential Yes: The 50th Anniversary Tour – Spring/Summer 2018 ==
Quintessential Yes: The 50th Anniversary Tour
- World tour by Yes Featuring Jon Anderson, Trevor Rabin, Rick Wakeman
- Location: Europe, North America
- Start date: 3 June 2018
- End date: 9 September 2018
- Legs: 2
- No. of shows: 18

Yes Featuring Jon Anderson, Trevor Rabin, Rick Wakeman concert chronology
- An Evening of Yes Music and More (2016–2017); Quintessential Yes: The 50th Anniversary Tour (2018)

Quintessential Yes: The 50th Anniversary Tour was a Spring/Summer 2018 concert tour by the rock band Yes Featuring Jon Anderson, Trevor Rabin, Rick Wakeman and their second and final tour. It followed their 2016-17 An Evening of Yes Music and More tour. During the tour, the band performed at the Stone Free Festival at The O_{2} Arena in London.

The tour overlapped with a simultaneous 50th anniversary tour by Howe and White's ongoing line-up of Yes. This was the final time, to date, that Anderson, Rabin or Wakeman toured under the "Yes" name, though Anderson continues to tour under his own name, heavily promoting the inclusion of Yes material.

=== Personnel ===
Yes featuring Jon Anderson, Trevor Rabin and Rick Wakeman

- Jon Anderson – lead vocals, acoustic guitar
- Trevor Rabin – lead guitar, backing and lead vocals
- Rick Wakeman – keyboards

Additional musicians

- Iain Hornal – bass, backing vocals (European dates)
- Lee Pomeroy – bass, backing vocals (US Dates)
- Lou Molino III – drums, percussion, backing vocals

=== Setlist ===
Setlist:

1. "Cinema"
2. "Hold On"
3. "South Side of the Sky" (dropped after June 17, 2018)
4. "And You and I"
5. "Changes"
6. "Perpetual Change"
7. "I've Seen All Good People"
8. "Rhythm of Love"
9. "Lift Me Up" (added starting August 26, 2018)
10. "I Am Waiting"
11. "Heart of the Sunrise"
12. "Awaken"
13. "Owner of a Lonely Heart"
14. "Roundabout"

=== Tour dates ===
The following tour dates are taken from the band's official website.

List of concerts, showing date, city, country and venue.
Date	City	Country	Venue
Europe
3 June 2018	Warsaw	Poland	Park Sowińskiego
5 June 2018	Mannheim	Germany	Zelt Festival
7 June 2018	Oslo	Norway	Sentrum Scene
9 June 2018	Norje	Sweden	Sweden Rock Festival
10 June 2018	Copenhagen	Denmark	Vega
12 June 2018	Newcastle	England	Newcastle City Hall
13 June 2018	York	England	Barbican Centre
17 June 2018	London	England	The O_{2} Arena; Stone Free Festival
North America
26 August 2018	Los Angeles	United States	Whisky a Go Go
27 August 2018	San Diego	United States	Humphrey's Concerts By The Bay
29 August 2018	Los Angeles	United States	Greek Theatre
31 August 2018	Phoenix	United States	Celebrity Theatre
1 September 2018	Las Vegas	United States	Westgate Resort & Casino
3 September 2018	Denver	United States	Levitt Pavilion
5 September 2018	Milwaukee	United States	Riverside Theater
7 September 2018	Chicago	United States	Ravinia Festival
8 September 2018	Northfield	United States	Hard Rock Live
9 September 2018	Huber Heights	United States	Rose Music Center

== Yes's Cruise to the Edge 2019 ==
Date	City	Country	Venue
Cruise to the Edge 2019
4–9 February 2019	Yes headlining the 6th "Cruise to the Edge" Prog Rock Festival (sailing from Tampa, Florida on Monday 4 February 2019)		

== Yes's Japan "50th Anniversary" Winter Tour 2019 ==
=== Setlist 1 (19 - 22 February 2019) ===
Set 1:

- "Firebird Suite" (Igor Stravinsky)
- "Parallels"
- "Sweet Dreams"
- "Fly from Here, Part I: We Can Fly"
- "Nine Voices (Longwalker)"
- "Clap"
- "Madrigal"
- "Yours Is No Disgrace"

Close to the Edge:

- "Close to the Edge"
- "And You and I"
- "Siberian Khatru"

Encore:

- "No Opportunity Necessary, No Experience Needed"
- "Roundabout"
- "Starship Trooper"

=== Setlist 2 (23 February 2019) ===
Set 1:

- "Firebird Suite"
- "Close to the Edge"
- "Nine Voices (Longwalker)"
- "Parallels"
- "Clap"
- "Madrigal"
- "Fly from Here, Part I: We Can Fly"
- "Sweet Dreams"
- "Heart of the Sunrise"

Set 2:

- "Perpetual Change"
- "Does It Really Happen?"
- "Soon"
- "Yours Is No Disgrace"

Encore:

- "No Opportunity Necessary, No Experience Needed"
- "Roundabout"
- "Starship Trooper"

=== Setlist 3 (24 February 2019) ===
Set 1:

- "Firebird Suite"
- "Close to the Edge"
- "Nine Voices (Longwalker)"
- "Parallels"
- "Madrigal"
- "Fly from Here, Part I: We Can Fly"
- "Sweet Dreams"
- "Heart of the Sunrise"

Set 2:

- "Yours Is No Disgrace"
- "Clap"
- "Starship Trooper"
- "I've Seen All Good People"
- "Clap"
- "Perpetual Change"

Encore:

- "No Opportunity Necessary, No Experience Needed"
- "Roundabout"

Date	City	Country	Venue
Japan "50th anniversary" Winter Tour 2019
19 February 2019	Nagoya	Japan	Zepp
20 February 2019	Osaka	Japan	Archaic Hall
22 February 2019	Tokyo	Japan	Dome City Hall
23 February 2019	Tokyo	Japan	Dome City Hall
24 February 2019	Tokyo	Japan	Dome City Hall

== Yes's (Summer 2019 North American) Royal Affair Tour ==
The Royal Affair Tour was a Yes 28-date Summer 2019 North American joint tour with Asia, John Lodge (of The Moody Blues), Carl Palmer's ELP Legacy (featuring Arthur Brown on guest vocals) and Guns N' Roses guitarist Ron "Bumblefoot" Thal. The tour started on 12 June 2019 in Bethlehem, Pennsylvania, and ended on 28 July 2019 in Saratoga, California. Yes's guitarist Steve Howe rejoined Asia for a portion of their live set. The initial dates of the Royal Affair Tour are as follows.

Typical Set List

- Intro (Excerpt from Stravinsky's Firebird Suite)
- "No Opportunity Necessary, No Experience Needed" (Richie Havens)
- "America" (Paul Simon) (eventually switched with "Tempus Fugit")
- "Going for the One" (Anderson)
- "I've Seen All Good People" (Anderson, Squire)
- "Clap" (Howe) (occasionally replaced by "Second Initial" or another Steve Howe solo acoustic song)
- "Siberian Khatru" (Anderson, Howe, Wakeman)
- "Onward" (Squire)
- "Tempus Fugit" (Horn, Squire, Howe, Downes, White) (eventually switched with "America")
- "Rhythm of Love" (Anderson, Squire, Kaye, Rabin) (dropped after 27 June 2019, omitted on 25 June 2019)
- "The Gates of Delirium" (Anderson, Squire, Howe, White, Moraz)

Encore:

- "Imagine" (John Lennon)
- "Roundabout" (Anderson, Howe)
- "Starship Trooper" (Anderson, Squire, Howe) (played occasionally after 29 June 2019)

Other:

- "Ram" (played on 16 July 2019)
- "Masquerade" (played on 16 July 2019)
- "Intersection Blues" (played on 18 July 2019)
- "Country Mix" (played on 26 July 2019)
- "Cactus Boogie" (played on 15 June 2019)
- "Sketches in the Sun" (played on 12, 14 June 2019)
- "In the Course of the Day" (played on 22 June 2019, 5 July 2019)

Date	City	Country	Venue
Summer 2019 North American "Royal Affair" Tour
12 June 2019	Bethlehem	United States	Sands Bethlehem Event Center
14 June 2019	Farmingville	United States	Long Island Community Hospital Amphitheater
15 June 2019	Atlantic City	United States	Mark Etess Arena at Hard Rock Casino
16 June 2019	Holmdel Township	United States	PNC Bank Arts Center
20 June 2019	Westchester	United States	Westchester County Center
21 June 2019	Pittsburgh	United States	Stage AE
22 June 2019	Baltimore	United States	MECU Pavilion
24 June 2019	Toronto	Canada	Budweiser Stage
25 June 2019	Lewiston	United States	Artpark Amphitheater,
27 June 2019	Bethel	United States	Bethel Woods Center for The Arts
29 June 2019	Gilford	United States	Bank of New Hampshire Pavilion
30 June 2019	Providence	United States	Bold Point Park
3 July 2019	Rochester Mills	United States	Meadow Brook Amphitheatre
5 July 2019	Columbus	United States	Express Live
6 July 2019	Aurora	United States	Riveredge Park
8 July 2019	Nashville	United States	Grand Ole Opry House
10 July 2019	Cary	United States	Koka Booth Amphitheatre at Regency Park
12 July 2019	Clearwater	United States	Ruth Eckerd Hall
13 July 2019	Hollywood	United States	Seminole Hard Rock Hotel & Casino (Hard Rock Live)
15 July 2019	New Orleans	United States	Saegner Theatre
16 July 2019	Sugar Land	United States	Smart Financial Centre
18 July 2019	St. Augustine	United States	Saint Augustine Amphitheatre
20 July 2019	Irving	United States	The Pavilion at Toyota Music Factory
21 July 2019	Rogers	United States	Walmart AMP
24 July 2019	Phoenix	United States	Comerica Theatre
26 July 2019	Las Vegas	United States	The Joint (Hard Rock Hotel & Casino)
27 July 2019	Irvine	United States	Five Point Amphitheater
28 July 2019	Saratoga	United States	The Mountain Winery
