= Toyota Oakdale Theatre =

Coordinates: 41.449837°N 72.845335°W

Oakdale Theatre
- Interactive map of Oakdale Theatre
- Full name: Toyota presents the Oakdale Theatre, powered by Xfinity
- Former names: Oakdale Musical Theatre (1954-87); Oakdale Theatre (1988-96); SNET Oakdale Theatre (1996-2000) ctnow.com Oakdale Theatre (2000-02) careerbuilder.com Oakdale Theatre (2002-05); Chevrolet Theatre (2005-09)
- Address: 95 South Turnpike Road; Wallingford, CT 06492-4326
- Owner: Live Nation Connecticut
- Capacity: 4,803 (Main auditorium); 1,649 (The Dome)

Construction
- Opened: June 21, 1954
- Renovated: 1961; 1972; 1994-96
- Cost: $150,000 ($1.8 million in 2025 dollars)

Website
- Venue Website
- Building details

General information
- Renovated: July 7, 1996
- Renovation cost: $21 million ($45.6 million in 2025 dollars)

Renovating team
- Architects: Rothman, Rothman & Heineman Architects
- Main contractor: Klewin Construction

The Toyota Oakdale Theatre (originally known as the Oakdale Musical Theatre) is a multi-purpose performance venue, located in Wallingford, Connecticut. Opened in 1954, the venue consists of an auditorium and domed theatre, known as The Dome at Oakdale.

== History ==
The music venue was founded by Ben Segal in 1954. At this time, the theatre was an open-air theatre in the round venue seating 1,400. It was located in an alfalfa field near the Oakdale Tavern. The theatre opened in June 1954 and was used primarily for summer stock and thus the venue only operated seasonally. During its inaugural season, the theatre hosted many famous plays including: Kiss Me, Kate, South Pacific and Oklahoma!.

In 1962, Segal purchased the nearby tavern for $600,000. During this time, he also made slight modifications to the venue to make the experience better for the consumer. With the new features, the theatre also become a concert venue. The Oakdale became a regular concert venue when many acts also played the Westbury Music Fair. Act included: Tom Jones, Paul Anka, Led Zeppelin, The Who and The Doors.

In 1972, a wooden dome was erected to replace the tent and the capacity doubled to 3,200. The 70s drew in more concerts, as well as boxing and other sporting events. By the 1980s, the allure of the venue began to flicker. Despite its wooded dome, the venue continued to operate seasonally. With the theatre in the round buzz going out of style, the venue began to suffer financially. In 1989, Segal sold the venue to Robert Errato, who later created the Oakdale Development Limited Partnership.

Initially, Errato wanted to take the property and convert it into condominiums with office/retail space. After the community protested the change, (stating the theatre was considered a landmark to its residents) Errato abandoned his plans. Later, he went to the city council and proposed an $80 million plan to improve the theatre, but also used the acreage to include an office park and retail shops. Once again, the community were against his plans, stating the changes would bring unnecessary traffic and the changes would ruin the "country" setting of the town.

In 1994, Errato was eventually able to push forward with plans to renovate the theatre. The $21 million renovation included removing the central stage and giving the venue an auditorium-style seating. This meant the venue would erect a new building, while the wooded dome would be gutted and converted into a grand lobby. The new theater (and new name) debuted July 7, 1996, with a concert by Brooks & Dunn. In 1997, concerts began to take place in the former wooded dome, which gave birth to "The Dome at Oakdale". In 1998, SFX Entertainment purchased operating rights for $12 million.

=== Naming changes ===
- Oakdale Musical Theatre (June 21, 1954—December 16, 1989)
- Oakdale Theatre (December 17, 1989—July 6, 1996)
- SNET Oakdale Theatre (July 7, 1996—July 10, 2000)
- ctnow.com Oakdale Theatre (July 11, 2000—May 2, 2002)
- careerbuilder.com Oakdale Theatre (May 3, 2002—July 10, 2005)
- Chevrolet Theatre (July 11, 2005—December 11, 2009)
- Toyota Oakdale Theatre (December 11, 2009—present)

== Legal disputes ==
In 1998, the owners were served a cease-and-desist letter by the Town of Wallingford. In 1989, the venue was given a permit stating there could not be any double performances during the work-week. Famed illusionist David Copperfield was booked for a Wednesday and Thursday performance. The case was taken to the New Haven Superior Court and ruled in favor of Wallingford.

In 2002, owner Robert Errato sued operator Clear Channel Entertainment. Errato claimed Clear Channel served him with a termination letter and was no longer allowed on the property. Clear Channel claimed Errato violated several contract terms, including planning building inspections without consulting Clear Channel. From the case, Clear Channel purchased the venue and the property.

In December 2014, Town Planner Kacie Costello issued the venue another cease-and-desist letter, this time over noise ordinance. According to the letter, The Dome at Oakdale was listed as a lobby/reception area and not a performing arts venue. The noise from concerts in the Dome received several complaints from the neighboring homes. Many residents felt the "landmark" would close down. A Facebook campaign was created and many residents took to the streets to protest.

Despite the letter, Live Nation stated they will continue to book concerts in the auditorium and dome. In May 2015, the Town of Wallingford decided to lift the order however the theatre still had to adhere to several ordinances regarding the noise issue. Jim Koplik, president of Live Nation Connecticut requested a state grant for $1.2 million to add soundproofing to the Dome. However, the State requested Koplik issues a 10-percent fee to all tickets sold. Koplik withdrew his request from funding stating it would be unfair to add the admissions tax.

== See also ==
- House of Blues
