= The Calling =

The Calling may refer to:

== Art ==
- The Calling (McCann sculpture), a 2003 outdoor sculpture in Belfast
- The Calling (di Suvero), a 1982 public artwork by American artist Mark di Suvero

== Books ==
- The Calling, a novel by Kelley Armstrong
- Luther: The Calling, a 2011 novel by Neil Cross
- The Calling, a novel by David Gaider 2011
- The Calling, a novel by Inger Ash Wolfe 2000
- The Calling, a book by Blair Grubb 2010
- The Calling, a novel by Rachelle Dekker 2016

== Film and TV ==
- The Calling (2000 film), a 2000 horror film with Laura Harris, Richard Lintern, Francis Magee
- The Calling, a 2002 film about televangelist Leroy Jenkins
- The Calling (2009 film), a 2009 British drama film with Emily Beecham
- The Calling (2014 film), a 2014 Canadian thriller film with Susan Sarandon
- The Calling (TV series), a 2022 American crime drama series

== Music ==
- The Calling (band), an American alternative rock band

=== Albums ===
- The Calling (Aquarium Rescue Unit album), 2003
- The Calling (Hilltop Hoods album), 2003
- The Calling (Mary Chapin Carpenter album), 2007
- The Calling (Méav album), a 2013 album by Méav Ní Mhaolchatha
- The Calling: Celebrating Sarah Vaughan, 2001 album by Dianne Reeves

=== Songs ===
- "The Calling" (song), a 1994 song by Yes
- "The Calling", a song by Becoming the Archetype, from the album Children of the Great Extinction
- "The Calling", a song by Gothminister, from the album Empire of Dark Salvation
- "The Calling", a song by Northlane, from the album Singularity
- "The Calling", a song by Santana, from the album Supernatural
- "The Calling", a song by TheFatRat
- "The Calling", a song by The Killers, from the album Wonderful Wonderful
- "The Calling", a song by Ira Stein & Russel Walder, from the album Transit

== Other ==
- Calling (video game), a survival horror video game

== See also ==
- Calling (disambiguation)
- The Calling of St Matthew, a painting by Caravaggio
