= List of Yes concert tours (1980s–90s) =

The English progressive rock band Yes has toured for five decades.

The band played live from its creation in Summer 1968. Their first overseas shows were in Belgium and the Netherlands in June 1969. They played regularly through December 1980, with the band splitting up early the next year. The band reformed in 1983, and regular tours resumed in 1984 and continued over the next few decades. The longest break in touring came from late 2004 through late 2008. Touring has tended to focus on the UK and the rest of Europe, The United States, Canada and Japan, but the band have also played other parts of the world, notably Australia.

== Drama Tour ==
Drama Tour
- World tour by Yes
- Location: United States, Canada, Europe
- Associated album: Drama
- Start date: 29 August 1980
- End date: 18 December 1980
- Legs: 2
- No. of shows: 65 (66 scheduled)

Lineup:

- Geoff Downes – keyboards, vocoder
- Trevor Horn – vocals, additional guitar and percussion
- Steve Howe – guitars, vocals
- Chris Squire – bass, vocals
- Alan White – drums

Setlist:

- "Does it Really Happen?" (Squire, Howe, White, Trevor Horn, Geoff Downes)
- "Yours Is No Disgrace" (Anderson, Squire, Howe, Kaye, Bruford)
- "Into the Lens" (Squire, Howe, White, Horn, Downes)
- "Clap" (Howe)
- "And You and I" (Anderson, Squire, Howe, Bruford)
- "Go Through This" (Squire, Howe, White, Horn, Downes)
- "Man in a White Car Suite" (Geoff Downes solo keyboard medley of "White Car" and "Video Killed the Radio Star" with vocoded vocals) (Squire, Howe, White, Horn, Downes/Horn, Downes, Bruce Woolley)
- "We Can Fly from Here" (Horn, Downes, Squire)
- "Tempus Fugit" (Squire, Howe, White, Horn, Downes)
- "Amazing Grace/The Fish (Schindleria Praematurus)" (John Newton, arr. Squire/Squire)
- "Machine Messiah" (Squire, Howe, White, Horn, Downes)
- "Starship Trooper" (Anderson, Squire, Howe)
- "Roundabout" (Anderson, Howe)

Also occasionally played were:

- "Parallels" (Squire) (29–30 August 1980, 1, 4–5, 8–10, 12–14, 22, 25–27 September, 2 October, 16 November 1980)
- "Surface Tension" (Steve Howe solo acoustic guitar piece) (Played on 17 October 1980)
- "Video Killed the Radio Star" (Horn, Downes, Woolley) (originally by The Buggles in 1979) (Played on 6 October 1980)
- "White Car" (a cappella) (Played 27, 29–30 November, 2– 4, 6–7, 9–12, 14, 15–18 December 1980)

Tour dates

Date	City	Country	Venue	Tickets sold / available	Gross revenue
United States and Canada
29 August 1980	Toronto	Canada	Maple Leaf Gardens	16,500 / 16,500	$231,000
30 August 1980	Montreal	Canada	Montreal Forum	17,872 / 18,000	$223,400
1 September 1980	Hartford	United States	Hartford Civic Center		
2 September 1980	Portland	United States	Cumberland County Civic Center		
4 September 1980	New York City	United States	Madison Square Garden	54,000 / 54,000	$680,000
5 September 1980	New York City	United States	Madison Square Garden	54,000 / 54,000	$680,000
6 September 1980	New York City	United States	Madison Square Garden	54,000 / 54,000	$680,000
8 September 1980	Providence	United States	Providence Civic Center		
9 September 1980	Boston	United States	Boston Garden		
10 September 1980	Glen Falls	United States	Glens Falls Civic Center		
11 September 1980	Landover	United States	Capital Centre		
12 September 1980	Philadelphia	United States	The Spectrum	32,861 / 35,000	$410,762
13 September 1980	Philadelphia	United States	The Spectrum	32,861 / 35,000	$410,762
14 September 1980	Binghamton	United States	Broome County Veterans Memorial Arena		
16 September 1980	Rochester	United States	Rochester War Memorial		
17 September 1980	Buffalo	United States	Buffalo Memorial Auditorium		
18 September 1980	Pittsburgh	United States	Pittsburgh Civic Arena		
19 September 1980	Detroit	United States	Joe Louis Arena		
20 September 1980	Richfield	United States	Richfield Coliseum		
21 September 1980	Cincinnati	United States	Riverfront Coliseum		
22 September 1980	Chicago	United States	International Amphitheatre	18,000 / 18,000	$190,836
23 September 1980	Chicago	United States	International Amphitheatre	18,000 / 18,000	$190,836
25 September 1980	St. Louis	United States	The Checkerdome	5,259 / 16,000	$46,218
26 September 1980	Tulsa	United States	Tulsa Convention Center		
27 September 1980	Dallas	United States	Reunion Arena		
28 September 1980	San Antonio	United States	HemisFair Arena		
29 September 1980	Houston	United States	The Summit		
~~1 October 1980~~	Tempe	United States	University Activity Center		
2 October 1980	San Diego	United States	San Diego Sports Arena		
3 October 1980	Los Angeles	United States	Los Angeles Memorial Sports Arena		
4 October 1980	Los Angeles	United States	Los Angeles Memorial Sports Arena		
5 October 1980	Fresno	United States	Selland Arena		
6 October 1980	Daly City	United States	Cow Palace	8,805 / 13,000	$91,812
9 October 1980	Saint Paul	United States	St. Paul Civic Center		
10 October 1980	Notre Dame	United States	Convocation Center		
11 October 1980	Champaign	United States	Assembly Hall		
13 October 1980	Louisville	United States	Louisville Gardens		
14 October 1980	Nashville	United States	Municipal Auditorium		
16 October 1980	Bethlehem	United States	Stabler Arena		
17 October 1980	Philadelphia	United States	The Spectrum	13,541 / 15,000	$122,361
18 October 1980	Hampton	United States	Hampton Coliseum		
19 October 1980	Uniondale	United States	Nassau Coliseum		
20 October 1980	New Haven	United States	New Haven Coliseum		
United Kingdom
16 November 1980	Bristol	England	Hippodrome Theatre		
17 November 1980	Oxford	England	New Theatre		
19 November 1980	Birmingham	England	Birmingham Odeon	4,878 / 4,878	$68,292
20 November 1980	Birmingham	England	Birmingham Odeon	4,878 / 4,878	$68,292
22 November 1980	Queensferry	Wales	Deeside Leisure Centre		
24 November 1980	Leicester	England	De Montfort Hall		
25 November 1980	Leicester	England	De Montfort Hall		
27 November 1980	Glasgow	Scotland	Apollo Theatre		
29 November 1980	Edinburgh	Scotland	Playhouse Theatre		
30 November 1980	Edinburgh	Scotland	Playhouse Theatre		
2 December 1980	Newcastle	England	Newcastle City Hall		
3 December 1980	Newcastle	England	Newcastle City Hall		
4 December 1980	Newcastle	England	Newcastle City Hall		
6 December 1980	Manchester	England	Apollo Theatre		
7 December 1980	Manchester	England	Apollo Theatre		
9 December 1980	Southampton	England	Mayflower Theatre		
10 December 1980	Southampton	England	Mayflower Theatre		
11 December 1980	Brighton	England	Brighton Centre		
12 December 1980	London	England	Lewisham Odeon		
14 December 1980	London	England	Hammersmith Odeon		
15 December 1980	London	England	Hammersmith Odeon		
16 December 1980	London	England	Hammersmith Odeon		
17 December 1980	London	England	Rainbow Theatre		
18 December 1980	London	England	Rainbow Theatre		

== 9012Live Tour ==
9012Live Tour
- World tour by Yes
- Location: United States, Canada, Europe, South America
- Associated album: 90125
- Start date: 28 February 1984
- End date: 9 February 1985
- Legs: 4
- No. of shows: 141 (144 scheduled)

Lineup:

- Jon Anderson – vocals, additional keyboards and percussion
- Tony Kaye – keyboards, vocals
- Trevor Rabin – guitars, vocals
- Chris Squire – bass, vocals
- Alan White – drums, percussion, vocals

and

- Casey Young – additional keyboards (offstage)

Setlist:

- "Cinema" (Trevor Rabin, Kaye, Squire, White)
- "Leave It" (Rabin, Horn, Squire)
- "Our Song" (dropped between 4 March 1984 and 9 August 1984, dropped after 1 October 1984) (Anderson, Squire, Rabin, White)
- "Yours Is No Disgrace" (dropped between 9 August 1984 and 1 October 1984) (Anderson, Squire, Howe, Kaye, Bruford)
- "Hold On" (Anderson, Rabin, Squire)
- "Perpetual Change" (dropped after 1 March 1984) (Anderson, Squire)
- "Hearts" (Anderson, Rabin, Kaye, White, Squire)
- "I've Seen All Good People" (Anderson, Squire)
- Kaye solo/"Si" (dropped between 29 August 1984 and 1 October 1984) (Kaye)
- "Solly's Beard" (Rabin)
- "Changes" (Rabin, Anderson, White)
- "And You and I" (Anderson, Squire, Howe, Bruford)
- "Soon"
- "Make It Easy" (Intro)/Owner of a Lonely Heart" (Rabin, Anderson, Squire, Horn)
- "It Can Happen" (Anderson, Squire, Rabin)
- "Long Distance Runaround" (dropped after 26 July 1984)
- "Whitefish/Amazing Grace" (Squire; traditional, arr. Squire)
- "City of Love" (Anderson, Rabin)
- "Starship Trooper" (Anderson, Squire, Howe)
- "Roundabout" (Anderson, Howe)
- "Gimme Some Lovin'" (added on from 9 August 1984) (Steve Winwood, Spencer Davis, Muff Winwood) (originally by The Spencer Davis Group in 1966)

Also occasionally played were:

- "Sweet Dreams" (Anderson, Foster) (Played on 5 March 1984 and 6 March 1984)
- "I'm Down" (Lennon-McCartney) (Played on 24 June 1984 and 1 September 1984)
- "Awaken" (Played on 9, 11 August 1984)
- "Whitefish" (Played on 14 March 1984, 11 May 1984, and 1 July 1984)
- "Ritual (Nous sommes du soleil) (Played on 7, 11, 12, 14 July 1984, and 21, 22 August 1984)

Date	City	Country	Venue	Tickets sold / available	Gross revenue
United States and Canada
28 February 1984	Millersville	United States	Millersville University		
1 March 1984	Columbus	United States	Ohio Center	6,864 / 6,864	$82,368
2 March 1984	Toledo	United States	Centennial Hall		
4 March 1984	Detroit	United States	Joe Louis Arena	15,501 / 15,501	$209,263
5 March 1984	Champaign	United States	Assembly Hall		
6 March 1984	Cedar Rapids	United States	Five Seasons Center		
7 March 1984	Saint Paul	United States	St. Paul Civic Center		
8 March 1984	Rosemont	United States	Rosemont Horizon	28,452 / 28,452	$383,361
9 March 1984	Rosemont	United States	Rosemont Horizon	28,452 / 28,452	$383,361
10 March 1984	Milwaukee	United States	MECCA Arena	10,732 / 11,609	$120,047
11 March 1984	St. Louis	United States	Kiel Auditorium	8,576 / 10,532	$106,814
12 March 1984	Kansas City	United States	Kemper Arena	12,670 / 13,882	$155,865
14 March 1984	Oklahoma City	United States	Myriad Convention Center		
15 March 1984	Dallas	United States	Reunion Arena		
16 March 1984	Houston	United States	The Summit		
17 March 1984	Austin	United States	Frank Erwin Center	12,092 / 13,628	$143,989
20 March 1984	Denver	United States	McNichols Sports Arena	15,247 / 18,000	$209,289
21 March 1984	Albuquerque	United States	Tingley Coliseum		
22 March 1984	Phoenix	United States	Arizona Veterans Memorial Coliseum	8,570 / 13,460	$107,125
23 March 1984	Tucson	United States	McKale Center	5,974 / 14,418	$74,618
24 March 1984	Paradise	United States	Thomas & Mack Center	6,541 / 10,274	$96,855
26 March 1984	Inglewood	United States	The Forum	15,484 / 15,484	$185,808
27 March 1984	San Diego	United States	San Diego Sports Arena		
28 March 1984	Inglewood	United States	The Forum	15,556 / 15,556	$207,463
29 March 1984	Daly City	United States	Cow Palace		
30 March 1984	Daly City	United States	Cow Palace		
31 March 1984	Reno	United States	Lawlor Events Center		
2 April 1984	Vancouver	Canada	Pacific Coliseum	8,818 / 10,000	$102,164
3 April 1984	Seattle	United States	Seattle Center Coliseum		
4 April 1984	Pullman	United States	Beasley Coliseum		
5 April 1984	Boise	United States	BSU Pavilion		
7 April 1984	Casper	United States	Casper Events Center		
8 April 1984	Rapid City	United States	Rushmore Plaza Civic Center		
10 April 1984	Saint Paul	United States	St. Paul Civic Center		
11 April 1984	Madison	United States	Dane County Coliseum	6,903 / 9,813	$93,184
12 April 1984	Indianapolis	United States	Market Square Arena		
13 April 1984	Cincinnati	United States	Riverfront Coliseum		
15 April 1984	Nashville	United States	Nashville Municipal Auditorium	8,333 / 9,470	$104,384
16 April 1984	Atlanta	United States	Omni Coliseum	11,466 / 11,466	$137,592
18 April 1984	Lakeland	United States	Lakeland Civic Center	17,982 / 20,000	$236,585
19 April 1984	Lakeland	United States	Lakeland Civic Center	17,982 / 20,000	$236,585
20 April 1984	North Fort Myers	United States	Lee County Civic Center	6,293 / 9,000	$78,552
21 April 1984	Pembroke Pines	United States	Hollywood Sportatorium		
22 April 1984	Jacksonville	United States	Jacksonville Veterans Memorial Coliseum	6,219 / 10,276	$80,847
24 April 1984	Memphis	United States	Mid-South Coliseum		
25 April 1984	Lexington	United States	Rupp Arena		
26 April 1984	Notre Dame	United States	Convocation Center		
28 April 1984	Oxford	United States	Millett Hall	9,992 / 10,000	$104,384
29 April 1984	Erie	United States	Erie Civic Center	7,500 / 7,500	$91,935
30 April 1984	Philadelphia	United States	The Spectrum	18,355 / 18,355	$230,224
1 May 1984	Pittsburgh	United States	Civic Arena	12,097 / 15,000	$145,164
2 May 1984	Richfield	United States	Richfield Coliseum		
4 May 1984	Hartford	United States	Hartford Civic Center	26,479 / 32,152	$323,242
5 May 1984	Hartford	United States	Hartford Civic Center	26,479 / 32,152	$323,242
7 May 1984	East Rutherford	United States	Brendan Byrne Arena	19,286 / 20,528	$259,924
8 May 1984	Providence	United States	Providence Civic Center	11,015 / 12,100	$135,416
9 May 1984	Buffalo	United States	Buffalo Memorial Auditorium		
10 May 1984	Rochester	United States	Rochester Community War Memorial	9,235 / 9,235	$111,372
11 May 1984	Uniondale	United States	Nassau Coliseum		
12 May 1984	Worcester	United States	Worcester Centrum	12,507 / 12,507	$151,333
14 May 1984	New York City	United States	Madison Square Garden		
15 May 1984	Landover	United States	Capital Centre	17,413 / 18,500	$217,662
Europe
11 June 1984	Stockholm	Sweden	Johanneshovs Isstadion		
13 June 1984	Copenhagen	Denmark	Falkoner Center		
14 June 1984	Malmö	Sweden	Malmö Isstadion		
15 June 1984	Gothenburg	Sweden	Scandinavium		
16 June 1984	Drammen	Norway	Drammenshallen		
18 June 1984	West Berlin	West Germany	Waldbühne		
19 June 1984	Hamburg	West Germany	Alsterdorfer Sporthalle		
21 June 1984	Cologne	West Germany	Sporthalle		
22 June 1984	Stuttgart	West Germany	Hanns-Martin-Schleyer-Halle		
23 June 1984	Dortmund	West Germany	Westfalenhallen		
24 June 1984	Dortmund	West Germany	Westfalenhallen		
25 June 1984	Munich	West Germany	Olympiahalle		
26 June 1984	Vienna	Austria	Wiener Stadthalle		
28 June 1984	Mannheim	West Germany	Eisstadion am Friedrichspark		
29 June 1984	Frankfurt	West Germany	Festhalle Frankfurt		
30 June 1984	Würzburg	West Germany	Carl-Diem-Halle		
1 July 1984	Rotterdam	Netherlands	Rotterdam Ahoy		
2 July 1984	Rotterdam	Netherlands	Rotterdam Ahoy		
3 July 1984	Brussels	Belgium	Forest National		
5 July 1984	Nantes	France	Stade de la Beaujoire		
7 July 1984	Paris	France	Palais Omnisports de Paris-Bercy		
8 July 1984	Paris	France	Palais Omnisports de Paris-Bercy		
11 July 1984	London	England	Wembley Arena		
12 July 1984	London	England	Wembley Arena		
14 July 1984	Birmingham	England	NEC Arena		
17 July 1984	Zürich	Switzerland	Hallenstadion		
18 July 1984	Milan	Italy	Palasport di San Siro		
20 July 1984	Nice	France	Palais des Expositions		
21 July 1984	Béziers	France	Arènes de Béziers		
22 July 1984	Biarritz	France	Parc des Sports Aguiléra		
24 July 1984	Barcelona	Spain	La Monumental		
26 July 1984	Madrid	Spain	Campo de Fútbol de Vallecas		
United States and Canada
9 August 1984	Omaha	United States	Omaha Civic Auditorium	10,000 / 10,000	$122,500
11 August 1984	East Troy	United States	Alpine Valley Music Theatre	13,406 / 20,000	$157,136
12 August 1984	Hoffman Estates	United States	Poplar Creek Music Theater		
13 August 1984	Clarkston	United States	Pine Knob Music Theatre		
15 August 1984	Louisville	United States	Freedom Hall		
16 August 1984	Cincinnati	United States	Riverbend Music Center		
17 August 1984	Fort Wayne	United States	Allen County War Memorial Coliseum		
18 August 1984	Wyoming	United States	Fort Wyoming in Lamar Park		
20 August 1984	Ottawa	Canada	Lansdowne Park		
21 August 1984	Quebec City	Canada	Quebec City Coliseum		
22 August 1984	Montreal	Canada	Montreal Forum		
23 August 1984	Toronto	Canada	CNE Grandstand		
24 August 1984	Cuyahoga Falls	United States	Blossom Music Center		
25 August 1984	Rochester	United States	Rochester Community War Memorial		
26 August 1984	Syracuse	United States	Great New York State Fair		
27 August 1984	Saratoga Springs	United States	Saratoga Performing Arts Center		
29 August 1984	New York City	United States	Forest Hills Tennis Stadium		
1 September 1984	Hershey	United States	Hersheypark Arena		
2 September 1984	Springfield	United States	Springfield Civic Center	5,348 / 9,800	$69,255
3 September 1984	Portland	United States	Cumberland County Civic Center		
4 September 1984	Holmdel	United States	Garden State Arts Center		
6 September 1984	Columbia	United States	Merriweather Post Pavilion		
7 September 1984	Boston	United States	Boston Garden		
8 September 1984	New Haven	United States	New Haven Coliseum	8,104 / 10,700	$106,196
9 September 1984	Philadelphia	United States	The Spectrum	35,917 / 35,917	$488,058
10 September 1984	Philadelphia	United States	The Spectrum	35,917 / 35,917	$488,058
12 September 1984	Hampton	United States	Hampton Coliseum		
13 September 1984	Charlotte	United States	Charlotte Coliseum		
14 September 1984	Greensboro	United States	Greensboro Coliseum		
15 September 1984	Atlanta	United States	Omni Coliseum		
16 September 1984	Bonner Springs	United States	Sandstone Amphitheater		
18 September 1984	Boulder	United States	CU Events Center	7,616 / 12,170	$98,305
20 September 1984	Reno	United States	Lawlor Events Center	6,959 / 8,000	$104,385
21 September 1984	Berkeley	United States	Hearst Greek Theater	16,952 / 16,952	$257,640
22 September 1984	Berkeley	United States	Hearst Greek Theater	16,952 / 16,952	$257,640
23 September 1984	Irvine	United States	Irvine Meadows Amphitheatre	16,085 / 16,085	$189,127
25 September 1984	Salt Lake City	United States	Salt Palace		
27 September 1984	Calgary	Canada	Olympic Saddledome		
28 September 1984	Edmonton	Canada	Northlands Coliseum		
29 September 1984	Edmonton	Canada	Northlands Coliseum		
1 October 1984	Portland	United States	Memorial Coliseum		
South America
17 January 1985	Rio de Janeiro	Brazil	Rock in Rio		
20 January 1985	Rio de Janeiro	Brazil	Rock in Rio		
27 January 1985	Maldonado	Uruguay	Campus Municipal de Maldonado		
1 February 1985	Buenos Aires	Argentina	José Amalfitani Stadium		
2 February 1985	Buenos Aires	Argentina	José Amalfitani Stadium		
~~6 February 1985~~	~~Rosario~~	Argentina	~~Teatro Olimpo~~		
9 February 1985	Buenos Aires	Argentina	José Amalfitani Stadium		
~~12 February 1985~~	~~Mar del Plata~~	Argentina	~~Hotel Provincial~~		
~~13 February 1985~~	~~Mar del Plata~~	Argentina	~~Hotel Provincial~~		

== Big Generator Tour ==
Big Generator Tour
- World tour by Yes
- Location: United States, Canada, Asia
- Associated album: Big Generator
- Start date: 14 November 1987
- End date: 13 April 1988
- Legs: 3
- No. of shows: 67 (92 scheduled)

Lineup:

- Jon Anderson – vocals, additional keyboards and percussion
- Tony Kaye – keyboards, vocals
- Trevor Rabin – guitars, vocals
- Chris Squire – bass, vocals
- Alan White – drums, percussion, vocals

Setlist:

- "Almost Like Love" (dropped after 20 December 1987) (Kaye, Anderson, Rabin, Squire)
- "Rhythm of Love" (Kaye, Anderson, Rabin, Squire)
- "Hold On" (Anderson, Rabin, Squire)
- "Heart of the Sunrise" (Anderson, Squire, Bruford)
- "Changes" (Rabin, Anderson, White; Kaye, Squire)
- "Big Generator" (Anderson, Rabin, Kaye, White, Squire)
- "Shoot High, Aim Low" (Anderson, Rabin, Kaye, White, Squire)
- "Holy Lamb (Song for Harmonic Convergence)" (Anderson)
- Kaye solo (Kaye)
- "Solly's Beard" (Rabin)
- "Make it Easy" (Intro)/Owner of a Lonely Heart" (Rabin, Anderson, Squire, Horn)
- "Yours Is No Disgrace" (Anderson, Squire, Howe, Kaye, Bruford)
- "Ritual (Nous Sommes du Soleil") (Excerpt) (added on 7 December 1987, first played on 28 November 1987) (Anderson, Squire, Howe, Wakeman, White)
- "Amazing Grace" (traditional, arr. Squire)
- "And You and I" (Anderson, Squire, Howe, Bruford)
- "I'm Running" (dropped after 22 November 1987) (Anderson, Rabin, Kaye, White, Squire)
- "Würm" (the third section of "Starship Trooper") (Howe)
- "Love Will Find a Way" (Rabin)
- "I've Seen All Good People" (Anderson, Squire)
- "Roundabout" (Anderson, Howe)

Also played occasionally were:

- "Soon" (Anderson) (Played on 4, 5 April 1988)
- "On The Silent Wings of Freedom" (Anderson, Squire) (only the bass riff only on 19 November 1987)
- "Final Eyes" (Played on 14 November 1987, 19 November 1987, 21 November 1987, and 28 November 1987)
- "Donguri Koro Koro" (Played on 4, 5, 7, 9, 10, 12, 13 April 1988)

Date	City	Country	Venue	Tickets sold / available	Gross revenue
United States and Canada
~~20 October 1987~~	~~Peoria~~	United States	~~Peoria Civic Center~~	N/A	
~~22 October 1987~~	~~Kansas City~~	United States	~~Kemper Arena~~	N/A	
~~23 October 1987~~	~~Oklahoma City~~	United States	~~The Myriad~~	N/A	
~~25 October 1987~~	~~Denver~~	United States	~~McNichols Sports Arena~~	N/A	
~~26 October 1987~~	~~Albuquerque~~	United States	~~Tingley Coliseum~~	N/A	
~~27 October 1987~~	~~Las Cruces~~	United States	~~Pan American Center~~	N/A	
~~29 October 1987~~	~~Houston~~	United States	~~The Summit~~	N/A	
~~31 October 1987~~	~~Dallas~~	United States	~~Reunion Arena~~	N/A	
~~1 November 1987~~	~~Baton Rouge~~	United States	~~LSU Assembly Center~~	N/A	
~~3 November 1987~~	~~Memphis~~	United States	~~Mid-South Coliseum~~	N/A	
~~5 November 1987~~	~~Jacksonville~~	United States	~~Jacksonville Memorial Coliseum~~	N/A	
~~6 November 1987~~	~~Hollywood~~	United States	~~Hollywood Sportatorium~~	N/A	
~~7 November 1987~~	~~Tampa~~	United States	~~USF Sun Dome~~	N/A	
~~10 November 1987~~	~~Charlotte~~	United States	~~Charlotte Coliseum~~	N/A	
~~11 November 1987~~	~~Chapel Hill~~	United States	~~Dean Smith Center~~	N/A	
~~13 November 1987~~	~~Atlanta~~	United States	~~Omni Coliseum~~	N/A	
14 November 1987	Omaha	United States	Omaha Civic Auditorium	10,000 / 10,000	$125,000
~~15 November 1987~~	~~South Bend~~	United States	~~Athletics and Convocation Center~~		
~~17 November 1987~~	~~Lincoln~~	United States	~~Delaney Sports Center~~		
~~18 November 1987~~	~~Bloomington~~	United States	~~Met Center~~		
19 November 1987	Springfield	United States	Prairie Capital Convention Center		
21 November 1987	Detroit	United States	Joe Louis Arena		
22 November 1987	Louisville	United States	Freedom Hall		
23 November 1987	St. Louis	United States	St. Louis Arena	6,974 / 10,000	$96,959
24 November 1987	Milwaukee	United States	MECCA Arena		
25 November 1987	Rosemont	United States	Rosemont Horizon	10,921 / 12,265	$191,118
27 November 1987	Pittsburgh	United States	Civic Arena		
28 November 1987	Richmond	United States	Richmond Coliseum		
29 November 1987	Philadelphia	United States	The Spectrum	30,839 / 30,839	$479,028
30 November 1987	Philadelphia	United States	The Spectrum	30,839 / 30,839	$479,028
1 December 1987	Syracuse	United States	Onondaga County War Memorial		
3 December 1987	Hartford	United States	Hartford Civic Center		
4 December 1987	Buffalo	United States	Buffalo Memorial Auditorium		
6 December 1987	Ottawa	Canada	Ottawa Civic Center	3,545 / 10,000	$60,841
7 December 1987	Quebec City	Canada	Quebec City Coliseum		
8 December 1987	Montreal	Canada	Montreal Forum		
9 December 1987	Toronto	Canada	Maple Leaf Gardens	9,103 / 10,000	$164,453
11 December 1987	Worcester	United States	Worcester Centrum		
12 December 1987	Rochester	United States	Rochester Community War Memorial		
13 December 1987	Landover	United States	Capital Centre		
15 December 1987	Troy	United States	Rensselaer Polytechnic Institute Fieldhouse		
16 December 1987	New York City	United States	Madison Square Garden		
17 December 1987	Providence	United States	Providence Civic Center	6,639 / 6,639	$109,543
18 December 1987	East Rutherford	United States	Brendan Byrne Arena		
19 December 1987	East Rutherford	United States	Brendan Byrne Arena		
20 December 1987	Bethlehem	United States	Stabler Arena	6,004 / 6,004	$105,070
United States and Canada
19 January 1988	Tallahassee	United States	Leon County Civic Center	3,687 / 6,944	$47,042
20 January 1988	Pensacola	United States	Pensacola Civic Center		
22 January 1988	Tampa	United States	USF Sun Dome	15,514 / 16,970	$256,480
23 January 1988	Tampa	United States	USF Sun Dome	15,514 / 16,970	$256,480
24 January 1988	Pembroke Pines	United States	Hollywood Sportatorium		
~~25 January 1988~~	~~Jacksonville~~	United States	~~Jacksonville Veterans Memorial Coliseum~~		
~~28 January 1988~~	~~Knoxville~~	United States	~~Thompson–Boling Arena~~		
~~29 January 1988~~	~~Columbus~~	United States	~~Ohio Center~~		
~~31 January 1988~~	~~Indianapolis~~	United States	~~Market Square Arena~~		
~~2 February 1988~~	~~Kalamazoo~~	United States	~~Wings Stadium~~		
5 February 1988	Uniondale	United States	Nassau Coliseum	12,508 / 14,268	$220,001
6 February 1988	Binghamton	United States	Broome County Veterans Memorial Arena	6,925 / 6,925	$84,886
7 February 1988	Philadelphia	United States	The Spectrum	13,637 / 13,637	$216,676
8 February 1988	Hershey	United States	Hersheypark Arena		
10 February 1988	Nashville	United States	Nashville Municipal Auditorium		
11 February 1988	Charlotte	United States	Charlotte Coliseum		
12 February 1988	Atlanta	United States	Omni Coliseum		
13 February 1988	Chapel Hill	United States	Dean Smith Center		
16 February 1988	Richfield	United States	Richfield Coliseum	9,527 / 12,245	$157,196
17 February 1988	Cincinnati	United States	Riverfront Coliseum		
19 February 1988	Houston	United States	The Summit	8,199 / 12,618	$131,478
20 February 1988	Lafayette	United States	Cajundome		
21 February 1988	Dallas	United States	Reunion Arena		
22 February 1988	Austin	United States	Frank Erwin Center	4,976 / 6,528	$71,066
24 February 1988	Tucson	United States	Tucson Convention Center	4,927 / 7,221	$73,040
26 February 1988	Sacramento	United States	ARCO Arena	6,247 / 9,700	$109,323
27 February 1988	Oakland	United States	Oakland–Alameda County Coliseum Arena	12,823 / 13,000	$237,226
28 February 1988	Reno	United States	Lawlor Events Center		
1 March 1988	Fresno	United States	Selland Arena		
2 March 1988	Inglewood	United States	The Forum	11,161 / 13,506	$165,261
4 March 1988	Santa Barbara	United States	Santa Barbara Bowl	4,526 / 4,526	$77,814
5 March 1988	Costa Mesa	United States	Pacific Amphitheatre	18,765 / 18,765	$195,681
8 March 1988	San Diego	United States	San Diego Sports Arena	5,715 / 8,928	$105,728
9 March 1988	Tempe	United States	ASU Activity Center	5,352 / 7,098	$79,497
10 March 1988	Las Vegas	United States	Aladdin Theatre	6,800 / 6,800	$83,354
11 March 1988	Albuquerque	United States	Tingley Coliseum		
13 March 1988	Denver	United States	McNichols Sports Arena	7,895 / 13,000	$142,397
30 March 1988	Honolulu	United States	Neil S. Blaisdell Center		
Asia
4 April 1988	Tokyo	Japan	Yoyogi National Gymnasium		
5 April 1988	Tokyo	Japan	Yoyogi National Gymnasium		
7 April 1988	Tokyo	Japan	Yoyogi National Gymnasium		
9 April 1988	Yokohama	Japan	Yokohama Cultural Gymnasium		
10 April 1988	Nagoya	Japan	Century Hall		
12 April 1988	Osaka	Japan	Osaka Prefectural Gymnasium		
13 April 1988	Osaka	Japan	Osaka Prefectural Gymnasium		

== An Evening of Yes Music Plus Tour (ABWH) ==
This tour is documented on the live release: An Evening of Yes Music Plus.

Lineup:

- Jon Anderson – vocals, percussion
- Bill Bruford – drums, percussion
- Steve Howe – guitars, vocals
- Rick Wakeman – keyboards

plus:

- Julian Colbeck – additional keyboards
- Tony Levin – bass, vocals, stick (replaced by Jeff Berlin 4–10 September 1989 due to illness)
- Milton McDonald – additional guitars, vocals

Setlist:

- Medley
- "Time and a Word (Anderson, Foster)
- "Owner of a Lonely Heart" (Anderson, Horn, Rabin, Squire)
- "Teakbois: The Life and Time of Bobby Dread" (Anderson, Howe, Wakeman, Bruford)
- "Clap/Mood for a Day" (Howe)
- Wakeman solo (Wakeman)
- "Long Distance Runaround"/Bruford solo (Anderson; Bruford)
- "Birthright" (Anderson, Howe, Wakeman, Bruford, Max Bacon)
- "And You and I" (Anderson, Howe, Squire, Bruford)
- "I've Seen All Good People" (Anderson, Squire) (omitted on some dates in 1990)
- "Close to the Edge" (Anderson, Howe)
- "Themes" (Anderson, Howe, Wakeman, Bruford)
- Levin-Bruford duet (Bruford, Tony Levin)
- "Brother of Mine" (Anderson, Howe, Wakeman, Bruford, Downes)
- "The Meeting" (Anderson, Howe, Wakeman, Bruford)
- "Heart of the Sunrise" (Anderson, Squire, Bruford)
- "Order of the Universe" (Anderson, Howe, Wakeman, Bruford, Rhett Lawrence)
- "Roundabout" (Anderson, Howe)
- "Starship Trooper" (Anderson, Howe, Squire) (omitted on some dates in 1990)
- "Sweet Dreams" (Anderson, Foster) (only occasionally from 4 August 1989)

Other songs:

- "Let's Pretend" (Anderson, Howe, Wakeman, Bruford, Vangelis) (played on 29 July 1989)
- "Quartet" (Anderson, Howe, Wakeman, Bruford) (played on 29 July 1989)
- "Leaves of Green" (Anderson, Howe, Squire, Wakeman, White) (played on 29 July 1989)
- "Soon" (Anderson) (played on 29 October 1989)

Date	City	Country	Venue
29 July 1989	Memphis	United States	Mud Island
30 July 1989	Atlanta	United States	Chastain Park
1 August 1989	Hampton	United States	Hampton Coliseum
2 August 1989	Harrisburg	United States	Metro Bank Park
3 August 1989	Philadelphia	United States	The Spectrum
4 August 1989	Uniondale	United States	Nassau Coliseum
5 August 1989	Columbia	United States	Merriweather Post Pavilion
6 August 1989	Mansfield	United States	Comcast Center
8 August 1989	Manchester	United States	Riverfront Park
9 August 1989	Middletown	United States	Orange County Fairgrounds
10 August 1989	Wantagh	United States	Jones Beach Amphitheater
11 August 1989	Hartford	United States	Hartford Civic Center
12 August 1989	Old Orchard Beach	United States	Seashore Performing Arts Center
13 August 1989	Holmdel	United States	PNC Bank Arts Center
15 August 1989	Pittsburgh	United States	A. J. Palumbo Center
16 August 1989	Cuyahoga Falls	United States	Blossom Music Center
17 August 1989	Weedsport	United States	Cayuga County Fair Speedway
18 August 1989	Corfu	United States	Darien Lake Performing Arts Center
19 August 1989	Clarkston	United States	Pine Knob Music Theater
20 August 1989	Hoffman Estates	United States	Poplar Creek Music Theater
22 August 1989	Toronto	Canada	Canadian National Exhibition Stadium
23 August 1989	Ottawa	Canada	Frank Clair Stadium
24 August 1989	Montreal	Canada	Montreal Forum
25 August 1989	Quebec City	Canada	L'Agora Du Vieux Port
28 August 1989	Houston	United States	The Summit
4 September 1989	San Diego	United States	Open Air Theater
5 September 1989	Costa Mesa	United States	Pacific Amphitheatre
6 September 1989	Los Angeles	United States	Greek Theater
7 September 1989	Los Angeles	United States	Greek Theater
8 September 1989	Santa Barbara	United States	Santa Barbara Bowl
9 September 1989	Mountain View	United States	Shoreline Amphitheatre (released on An Evening of Yes Music Plus DVD)
10 September 1989	Sacramento	United States	California State Fair
20 October 1989	Whitley Bay	England	Whitley Bay Ice Rink
21 October 1989	Edinburgh	Scotland	Playhouse Theater
22 October 1989	Edinburgh	Scotland	Playhouse Theater
24 October 1989	Birmingham	England	National Exhibition Centre
25 October 1989	Birmingham	England	National Exhibition Centre
28 October 1989	London	England	Wembley Arena
29 October 1989	London	England	Wembley Arena
2 November 1989	Brussels	Belgium	Vorst Nationaal
3 November 1989	Rotterdam	Netherlands	Rotterdam Ahoy
5 November 1989	Hamburg	West Germany	Alsterdorfer Sporthalle
6 November 1989	Copenhagen	Denmark	Folketeatret
8 November 1989	Stockholm	Sweden	Johanneshovs Isstadion
9 November 1989	Oslo	Norway	Skedsmohallen
11 November 1989	Cologne	West Germany	Sporthalle
12 November 1989	Kassel	West Germany	Stadhalle
13 November 1989	Munich	West Germany	Rudi-Sedlmeyer-Sporthalle
14 November 1989	Stuttgart	West Germany	Hanns-Martin-Schleyer-Halle
16 November 1989	Frankfurt	West Germany	Festhalle Frankfurt
17 November 1989	Würzburg	West Germany	Carl-Diem-Halle
18 November 1989	Basel	Switzerland	St. Jakobs-Halle
19 November 1989	Paris	France	Palais Omnisport Paris Bercy
20 November 1989	Turin	Italy	Palasport Di Torino
21 November 1989	Milan	Italy	Palatrussardi
23 November 1989	Rome	Italy	Palaeur
21 February 1990	Barcelona	Spain	Palacio Municipal De Los Deportes
22 February 1990	Madrid	Spain	Palacio De Deportes
23 February 1990	Zaragoza	Spain	Palacio de Deportes
1 March 1990	Tokyo	Japan	Nihon Hohsoh Kyokai
2 March 1990	Tokyo	Japan	Nihon Hohsoh Kyokai
4 March 1990	Tokyo	Japan	Nihon Hohsoh Kyokai
5 March 1990	Osaka	Japan	Festival Hall
7 March 1990	Yokohama	Japan	Yokohama Cultural Gymnasium
8 March 1990	Tokyo	Japan	Nihon Hohsoh Kyokai
12 March 1990	Vancouver	Canada	Pacific Coliseum
13 March 1990	Spokane	United States	Spokane Opera House
14 March 1990	Portland	United States	Chiles Center
15 March 1990	Seattle	United States	Paramount Theater
18 March 1990	Richmond	United States	The Mosque
19 March 1990	Philadelphia	United States	The Spectrum
20 March 1990	Boston	United States	Citi Performing Arts Center
22 March 1990	Washington, D.C.	United States	DAR Constitution Hall
23 March 1990	New York City	United States	Madison Square Garden

== Union Tour ==
Union Tour
- World tour by Yes
- Location: United States, Canada, Europe, Asia
- Associated album: Union
- Start date: 9 April 1991
- End date: 5 March 1992
- Legs: 4
- No. of shows: 84 (86 scheduled)

Lineup:

- Jon Anderson – lead vocals
- Bill Bruford – electric + acoustic drums & percussions
- Steve Howe – acoustic & electric guitars, backing vocals
- Tony Kaye – Hammond organ, synthesizers
- Trevor Rabin – electric guitars, lead & backing vocals
- Chris Squire – bass guitar, pedals, backing vocals
- Rick Wakeman – electric piano, synthesizers, keytar
- Alan White – acoustic drums & percussion

Setlist:

- "Yours Is No Disgrace" (Anderson, Squire, Howe, Kaye, Bruford)
- "Rhythm of Love" (Kaye, Anderson, Rabin, Squire)
- "Shock to the System" (Anderson, Howe, Jonathan Elias)
- "City of Love" (Rabin, Anderson) (Dropped after 9 April 1991)
- "Heart of the Sunrise" (Anderson, Squire, Bruford)
- Steve Howe solo section (Howe)
- "Make it Easy" (Intro)/Owner of a Lonely Heart" (Anderson, Rabin, Horn, Squire)
- "And You and I" (Anderson, Squire, Howe, Bruford)
- Drum duet (Bruford, White)
- "Hold On" (dropped after 13 June 1991) (Rabin, Anderson, Squire)
- Kaye solo (only between 12 April 1991 and 22 June 1991) (Kaye)
- "Changes" (Anderson, Rabin, White)
- "I've Seen All Good People" (added on from 19 April 1991) (Anderson, Squire)
- "Solly's Beard" (Rabin)
- "Take the Water to the Mountain" (Anderson) (Dropped after opening night)
- "Soon" (Anderson) (Dropped after opening night)
- "Long Distance Runaround" (replaced by "Saving My Heart" starting 12 July 1991) (Anderson; Rabin)
- "Whitefish/Amazing Grace" (Squire, White; traditional, arr. Squire)
- "Lift Me Up" (Rabin, Squire)
- Wakeman solo (Wakeman)
- "Awaken" (Anderson, Howe)
- "Roundabout" (Anderson, Howe)
- "Starship Trooper" (dropped after 17 April 1991) (Anderson, Squire, Howe)

Also played occasionally were:

- "Close to the Edge" (Anderson, Howe) (Played on 14 July 1991 without Trevor Rabin, Tony Kaye, or Alan White)
- "Gimme Some Lovin'" (Winwood, Davis, Winwood) (Played on 24 April 1991)

Date	City	Country	Venue	Tickets sold / available	Gross revenue
United States and Canada
9 April 1991	Pensacola	United States	Pensacola Civic Center		
12 April 1991	Atlantic City	United States	Etess Arena	9,700 / 9,700	$340,650
13 April 1991	Atlantic City	United States	Etess Arena	9,700 / 9,700	$340,650
14 April 1991	East Rutherford	United States	Brendan Byrne Arena	20,356 / 20,356	$449,594
16 April 1991	Philadelphia	United States	The Spectrum	18,585 / 18,585	$388,665
17 April 1991	Worcester	United States	Worcester Centrum	10,280 / 13,649	$208,450
18 April 1991	Hartford	United States	Hartford Civic Center	9,213 / 16,550	$230,889
19 April 1991	Fairfax	United States	Patriot Center	9,988 / 9,988	$225,966
20 April 1991	Uniondale	United States	Nassau Coliseum	18,056 / 18,056	$413,620
22 April 1991	Quebec City	Canada	Colisée de Québec	11,986 / 14,000	$275,720
23 April 1991	Toronto	Canada	Skydome	12,510 / 14,000	$299,150
24 April 1991	Montreal	Canada	Montreal Forum	9,417 / 13,000	$217,379
25 April 1991	Albany	United States	Knickerbocker Arena	8,621 / 10,000	$210,720
26 April 1991	Buffalo	United States	Buffalo Memorial Auditorium	10,496 / 17,000	$210,386
27 April 1991	Auburn Hills	United States	The Palace of Auburn Hills	15,000 / 15,000	$320,515
29 April 1991	Richfield	United States	Richfield Coliseum	12,385 / 15,000	$247,700
3 May 1991	Kalamazoo	United States	Wings Stadium	6,040 / 6,981	$129,270
4 May 1991	Fairborn	United States	Nutter Center	9,281 / 9,281	$221,703
5 May 1991	Champaign	United States	Assembly Hall		
6 May 1991	Rosemont	United States	Rosemont Horizon	14,676 / 15,747	$346,593
7 May 1991	Minneapolis	United States	Target Center	6,979 / 17,000	$153,440
9 May 1991	Denver	United States	McNichols Arena	9,214 / 15,422	$197,513
11 May 1991	Phoenix	United States	Desert Sky Pavilion	9,720 / 19,945	$170,983
12 May 1991	Paradise	United States	Thomas & Mack Center		
14 May 1991	San Diego	United States	San Diego Sports Arena	8,554 / 12,399	$199,459
15 May 1991	Inglewood	United States	The Forum	16,584 / 16,584	$405,095
16 May 1991	Sacramento	United States	ARCO Arena	8,159 / 8,554	$168,323
17 May 1991	Oakland	United States	Oakland–Alameda County Coliseum Arena	14,307 / 14,307	$323,563
19 May 1991	Portland	United States	Memorial Coliseum		
20 May 1991	Vancouver	Canada	Pacific Coliseum		
21 May 1991	Seattle	United States	Seattle Center Coliseum	10,020 / 14,000	$241,130
Europe
29 May 1991	Frankfurt	Germany	Festhalle Frankfurt		
30 May 1991	Munich	Germany	Olympiahalle		
31 May 1991	Stuttgart	Germany	Hanns-Martin-Schleyer-Halle		
1 June 1991	Oldenburg	Germany	Weser-Ems Halle		
2 June 1991	Cologne	Germany	Sporthalle		
3 June 1991	Paris	France	Le Zénith		
4 June 1991	Paris	France	Le Zénith		
6 June 1991	Grenoble	France	Le Summum		
7 June 1991	Marseille	France	Palais Des Sports De Marseille		
8 June 1991	Toulouse	France	Palais Des Sports De Toulouse		
10 June 1991	Zürich	Switzerland	Hallenstadion		
12 June 1991	Rome	Italy	Palaeur		
13 June 1991	Milan	Italy	Palatrussardi		
~~16 June 1991~~	Athens	Greece	Athens Sports Palace		
~~20 June 1991~~	Budapest	Hungary	MTK Stadium		
22 June 1991	Brussels	Belgium	Vorst Nationaal		
23 June 1991	Rotterdam	Netherlands	Rotterdam Ahoy		
25 June 1991	Birmingham	England	National Exhibition Centre		
26 June 1991	Birmingham	England	National Exhibition Centre		
28 June 1991	London	England	Wembley Arena		
29 June 1991	London	England	Wembley Arena		
30 June 1991	London	England	Wembley Arena		
United States and Canada
5 July 1991	Tampa	United States	Florida State Fairgrounds		
6 July 1991	Miami	United States	Miami Arena	11,902 / 14,000	$298,720
7 July 1991	Orlando	United States	Orlando Arena		
9 July 1991	Atlanta	United States	Coca-Cola Lakewood Amphitheatre		
10 July 1991	Raleigh	United States	Walnut Creek Amphitheatre		
12 July 1991	Philadelphia	United States	The Spectrum	29,389 / 36,240	$622,910
13 July 1991	Philadelphia	United States	The Spectrum	29,389 / 36,240	$622,910
14 July 1991	Lake Placid	United States	Lake Placid Olympic Sports Complex		
15 July 1991	New York City	United States	Madison Square Garden	15,158 / 15,158	$415,835
16 July 1991	Holmdel	United States	Garden State Arts Center	6,993 / 10,802	$168,985
18 July 1991	Mansfield	United States	Great Woods Center for the Performing Arts		
19 July 1991	Canandaigua	United States	Finger Lakes Performing Arts Center		
20 July 1991	Landover	United States	Capital Centre		
21 July 1991	Wantagh	United States	Jones Beach Theater	10,208 / 10,208	$262,100
22 July 1991	Middletown	United States	Orange County Fairgrounds Speedway		
24 July 1991	Burgettstown	United States	Star Lake Amphitheater		
25 July 1991	Tinley Park	United States	New World Music Theatre		
26 July 1991	East Troy	United States	Alpine Valley Music Theatre		
27 July 1991	Maryland Heights	United States	Riverport Amphitheater		
28 July 1991	Cincinnati	United States	Riverfront Coliseum		
30 July 1991	Clarkston	United States	Pine Knob Music Theatre		
31 July 1991	Noblesville	United States	Deer Creek Music Center	7,700 / 19,102	
1 August 1991	Lafayette	United States	Cajundome		
2 August 1991	The Woodlands	United States	Cynthia Woods Mitchell Pavilion		
3 August 1991	Dallas	United States	Starplex Amphitheatre	10,676 / 20,111	$204,332
6 August 1991	Costa Mesa	United States	Pacific Amphitheatre		
7 August 1991	Concord	United States	Concord Pavilion		
8 August 1991	Mountain View	United States	Shoreline Amphitheatre		
Asia
29 February 1992	Tokyo	Japan	Yoyogi National Gymnasium		
2 March 1992	Osaka	Japan	Osaka Castle Hall		
3 March 1992	Nagoya	Japan	Century Hall		
4 March 1992	Yokohama	Japan	Yokohama Bunka Taiikukan		
5 March 1992	Tokyo	Japan	Nippon Budokan		

== Talk Tour ==
Talk Tour
- World tour by Yes
- Location: United States, Canada, South America, Asia
- Associated album: Talk
- Start date: 18 June 1994
- End date: 11 October 1994
- Legs: 3
- No. of shows: 77 (80 scheduled)

This was the last tour to feature Trevor Rabin and Tony Kaye as members of Yes.

Touring Personnel:

Band

- Jon Anderson – vocals, percussion, keyboards
- Tony Kaye – keyboards
- Trevor Rabin – guitars, keyboards, vocals
- Chris Squire – bass guitar, vocals
- Alan White – drums, percussion

with

- Billy Sherwood – guitars, keyboards, bass guitar, vocals

Tour Management

- Chris Pollan - Tour manager
- Peter Mackay - Assistant tour manager
- Graham "Grim Reaper" Holmes - Production manager
- Mark Reinke - Stage manager
- Karen Holmes - Production assistant
- Jonathan Smeeton - Lighting/Set designer
- Butch Allen - Lighting director

Band Crew

- Jimmy Robison - drum tech
- Robbie Eagle - keyboard tech
- Paul Linford - guitar tech
- Richard Davis - bass tech
- John Laraio - Jon Anderson tech

Sound Crew

- Dave Natale - House Engineer
- Dave Skaff - Monitor Engineer
- Bart Adams - Sound Tech
- Kirk Shriener - Sound Tech
- Chad Shreiner - Sound Tech

Lighting Crew

- Bill Conte - Lighting Crew Head
- Sam Deleo - Vari*Lite Operator
- Gregg Kocurek - Vari*Lite Technician
- Ian England - Lighting Tech
- Garry Waldie - Lighting Tech
- Peter Moore - Roboscan Programmer

Setlist:

- "Perpetual Change" (Anderson, Squire)
- "The Calling" (Rabin, Anderson, Squire)
- "I Am Waiting" (Rabin, Anderson)
- "Rhythm of Love" (Kaye, Rabin, Anderson, Squire)
- "Hearts" (dropped after 30 September 1994) (Anderson, Rabin, Kaye, Squire, White)
- "Real Love" (Rabin, Anderson, Squire)
- "Changes" (Anderson, Rabin, White)
- "Heart of the Sunrise" (Anderson, Squire, Bruford)
- "Cinema" (dropped after 16 August 1994) (Squire, Rabin, White, Kaye)
- "City of Love" (dropped after 16 August 1994) (Rabin, Anderson)
- "Make it Easy" (Intro)/Owner of a Lonely Heart" (Anderson, Rabin, Squire, Horn)
- "Where Will You Be" (Dropped after 26 August 1994) (Rabin, Anderson)
- Trevor Rabin's Keyboard solo/"And You and I" (Rabin; Anderson, Squire, Howe, Bruford)
- "I've Seen All Good People" (Anderson, Squire)
- "Walls" (Anderson, Rabin, Roger Hodgson)
- "Endless Dream" (Rabin, Anderson)
- "Hold On" (only between 25 June 1994 and 26 July 1994) (Anderson, Rabin, Squire)
- "Roundabout" (Anderson, Howe)
- "Purple Haze" (added on from 13 August 1994) (Jimi Hendrix) (originally by Hendrix in 1967)

Date	City	Country	Venue
United States and Canada
~~16 June 1994~~	New York City	United States	Madison Square Garden
18 June 1994	Binghamton	United States	Broome County Veterans Memorial Arena
19 June 1994	Canandaigua	United States	Finger Lakes Performing Arts Center
21 June 1994	Allentown	United States	Allentown Fairgrounds
23 June 1994	Fairborn	United States	Nutter Center
24 June 1994	Columbus	United States	Polaris Amphitheater
25 June 1994	Clarkston	United States	Pine Knob Music Theater
26 June 1994	Noblesville	United States	Deer Creek Music Center
28 June 1994	Moline	United States	The MARK of the Quad Cities
29 June 1994	Maryland Heights	United States	Riverport Amphitheater
30 June 1994	Milwaukee	United States	Marcus Amphitheater
2 July 1994	Tinley Park	United States	New World Music Theater
3 July 1994	Minneapolis	United States	Target Center
4 July 1994	Bonner Springs	United States	Sandstone Amphitheater
6 July 1994	Morrison	United States	Red Rocks Amphitheatre
7 July 1994	Park City, Utah	United States	Wolf Mountain
9 July 1994	Salem	United States	L.B. Day Amphitheater
10 July 1994	George	United States	The Gorge Amphitheatre
~~11 July 1994~~	Vancouver	Canada	Deer Lake Park
13 July 1994	Concord	United States	Concord Pavilion
14 July 1994	Sacramento	United States	California Exposition and State Fair
15 July 1994	Mountain View	United States	Shoreline Amphitheatre
16 July 1994	Reno	United States	Reno-Hilton Amphitheater
17 July 1994	San Bernardino	United States	Blockbuster Pavilion
19 July 1994	Fresno	United States	Selland Arena
22 July 1994	Los Angeles	United States	Greek Theatre
23 July 1994	Los Angeles	United States	Greek Theatre
25 July 1994	Santa Barbara	United States	Santa Barbara Bowl
26 July 1994	San Diego	United States	Embarcadero Marina Park
27 July 1994	Paradise	United States	Thomas & Mack Center
28 July 1994	Phoenix	United States	Desert Sky Pavilion
30 July 1994	Dallas	United States	Starplex Amphitheater
31 July 1994	San Antonio	United States	SeaWorld San Antonio
1 August 1994	The Woodlands	United States	Cynthia Woods Mitchell Pavilion
~~3 August 1994~~	Oklahoma City	United States	The Myriad
5 August 1994	New Orleans	United States	Lakefront Arena
6 August 1994	Pensacola	United States	Pensacola Civic Center
7 August 1994	Atlanta	United States	Lakewood Amphitheater
9 August 1994	Tampa	United States	USF Sun Dome
10 August 1994	Miami	United States	Miami Arena
11 August 1994	Orlando	United States	Orlando Arena
12 August 1994	Jacksonville	United States	Veterans Memorial Coliseum
13 August 1994	Charlotte	United States	Blockbuster Pavilion
14 August 1994	Raleigh	United States	Walnut Creek Amphitheater
16 August 1994	Huntsville	United States	Von Braun Civic Center
17 August 1994	Little Rock	United States	Riverfest Amphitheater
18 August 1994	Nashville	United States	Starwood Amphitheatre
19 August 1994	Merrillville	United States	Star Plaza Theatre
20 August 1994	Cuyahoga Falls	United States	Blossom Music Center
21 August 1994	Middletown	United States	Orange County Fairgrounds Speedway
22 August 1994	Saratoga Springs	United States	Saratoga Performing Arts Center
24 August 1994	Burgettstown	United States	Star Lake Amphitheater
25 August 1994	Syracuse	United States	Great New York State Fair
26 August 1994	Philadelphia	United States	The Spectrum
27 August 1994	Richmond	United States	Classic Amphitheatre at Strawberry Hill
28 August 1994	Columbia	United States	Merriweather Post Pavilion
29 August 1994	Mansfield	United States	Great Woods Performing Arts Center
31 August 1994	Toronto	Canada	Kingswood Music Theater
1 September 1994	Montreal	Canada	Montreal Forum
2 September 1994	Quebec City	Canada	Quebec City Coliseum
~~3 September 1994~~	Old Orchard Beach	United States	Seashore Performing Arts Center
7 September 1994	Holmdel	United States	Garden State Arts Center
8 September 1994	Wantagh	United States	Jones Beach Amphitheatre
9 September 1994	New Haven	United States	New Haven Coliseum
10 September 1994	New York City	United States	Madison Square Garden
South America
14 September 1994	Rio de Janeiro	Brazil	Metropolitan
15 September 1994	São Paulo	Brazil	Olympia
16 September 1994	São Paulo	Brazil	Olympia
18 September 1994	Viña del Mar	Chile	Quinta Vergara Amphitheatre
20 September 1994	Santiago	Chile	Estación Mapocho
22 September 1994	Buenos Aires	Argentina	El Teatro De Broadway
23 September 1994	Buenos Aires	Argentina	El Teatro De Broadway
24 September 1994	Buenos Aires	Argentina	El Teatro De Broadway
Asia
29 September 1994	Osaka	Japan	Osaka Castle Hall
30 September 1994	Takamatsu	Japan	Prefectural Kenmin Hall
1 October 1994	Kokura Kita	Japan	Kosei Nenkin Hall
4 October 1994	Tokyo	Japan	Budokan Hall
5 October 1994	Tokyo	Japan	Budokan Hall
6 October 1994	Sendai	Japan	Sun Plaza Hall
10 October 1994	Nagoya	Japan	Rainbow Hall
11 October 1994	Hiroshima	Japan	Kosei Nenkin Hall

== San Luis Obispo shows (Keys to Ascension Tour) ==
These were the first shows to feature Steve Howe and Rick Wakeman since the Union tour. Wakeman played all three shows, but subsequently left the band, later re-joining in 2002. Since these shows, Howe has to this day been performing with the group.

Lineup:

- Jon Anderson – vocals
- Steve Howe – guitars, vocals
- Chris Squire – bass, vocals
- Rick Wakeman – keyboards
- Alan White – drums, percussion

Setlist:

- "Siberian Khatru" (Anderson, Howe, Wakeman)
- "Close to the Edge" (Anderson, Howe)
- "I've Seen All Good People" (Anderson, Squire)
- "Time and a Word" (Anderson, Foster)
- "And You and I" (Anderson, Squire, Howe, Bruford)
- "The Revealing Science of God (Dance of the Dawn)" (Anderson, Squire, Howe, Wakeman, White)
- "Going for the One"
- "Turn of the Century" (Anderson, Howe, White)
- "Happy Birthday to You (Chris Squire)" (Only on 4 March 1996)
- "America" (Simon)
- "Onward" (Squire)
- "Awaken" (Anderson, Howe)
- "Roundabout" (Anderson, Howe)
- "Starship Trooper" (Anderson, Squire, Howe)

Date	City	Country	Venue
4 March 1996	San Luis Obispo	United States	Edward's Fremont Theater
5 March 1996	San Luis Obispo	United States	Edward's Fremont Theater
6 March 1996	San Luis Obispo	United States	Edward's Fremont Theater

== Cancelled Know Tour ==
Date	City	Country	Venue
~~12 June 1997~~	Hartford	United States	Meadows Music Theatre
~~13 June 1997~~	Mansfield	United States	Great Woods Center for the Performing Arts
~~17 June 1997~~	New York City	United States	Beacon Theatre
~~18 June 1997~~	New York City	United States	Beacon Theatre
~~20 June 1997~~	Holmdel	United States	PNC Bank Arts Center at Garden State
~~23 June 1997~~	Charlotte	United States	Blockbuster Pavilion
~~1 July 1997~~	Cincinnati	United States	Riverbend Music Center Amphitheatre
~~21 July 1997~~	San Diego	United States	Hospitality Point
~~25 July 1997~~	Irvine	United States	Irvine Meadows Amphitheatre
~~26 July 1997~~	Universal City	United States	Universal Amphitheater
~~27 July 1997~~	Universal City	United States	Universal Amphitheater

This tour was entirely cancelled due to Wakeman's sudden departure.

== Open Your Eyes and 30th Anniversary Tour ==
Open Your Eyes Tour
- World tour by Yes
- Location: United States, Canada, Europe, South America, Asia
- Associated album: Open Your Eyes
- Start date: 17 October 1997
- End date: 14 October 1998
- Legs: 5
- No. of shows: 149 (165 scheduled)

Lineup:

- Jon Anderson – vocals, guitar
- Steve Howe – guitars, vocals
- Billy Sherwood – guitars, vocals
- Chris Squire – bass, vocals
- Alan White – drums, percussion

plus:

- Igor Khoroshev – keyboards, vocals

Setlist:

- "Siberian Khatru"
- "Rhythm of Love" (Kaye, Rabin, Anderson, Squire)
- "America" (Simon) (Dropped after 9 July 1998)
- "Open Your Eyes" (Anderson, Squire, Howe, White, Billy Sherwood)
- "And You and I" (Anderson, Squire, Howe, Bruford)
- "Heart of the Sunrise" (Anderson, Squire, Bruford)
- "Steve Howe solo section" (Howe)
- "Leaves of Green" (Anderson, Squire, Howe, Wakeman, White) (Dropped after 2 December 1997)
- "From the Balcony" (Anderson, Squire, Howe, White, Sherwood) (between 5 December 1997 and 24 April 1998)
- Khoroshev keyboard solo (dropped after 5 July 1998) (Igor Khoroshev)
- "Children of Light" (Anderson, Howe, Squire, Vangelis, Wakeman; Anderson) (replaced by "Wonderous Stories" starting 1 March 1998)
- "Long Distance Runaround"
- "Whitefish/Ritual (Nous sommes du Soleil)" (Excerpt) (Anderson, Squire, Howe, Wakeman, White)
- "Owner of a Lonely Heart" (Anderson, Rabin, Squire, Horn)
- "Soon" (Anderson) (Dropped after 22 November 1997)
- "The Revealing Science of God (Dance of the Dawn)" (Dropped after 24 April 1998, replaced by "Close to the Edge" from 18 June 1998)
- "I've Seen All Good People" (Anderson, Squire)
- "Roundabout" (Anderson, Howe)
- "Starship Trooper" (Anderson, Squire, Howe/Anderson, Squire, Howe, Kaye, Bruford) (replaced by "Yours Is No Disgrace" from 18 June 1998)

Also occasionally played were:

- "No Way We Can Lose" (Anderson, Squire, Howe, White, Sherwood) (Played on 17 October 1997 and 24 July 1998)
- "Ritual (Nous Sommes du Soleil)" (Anderson, Squire, Howe, Wakeman, White) (Played on 6 March 1998, 7 April 1998, 19 June 1998, 20 June 1998, and 23 June 1998)
- "Memphis, Tennessee" (Chuck Berry) (originally by Berry in 1959) (Played on 4 August 1998)

Date	City	Country	Venue
United States and Canada
17 October 1997	Hartford	United States	Meadows Music Theatre
18 October 1997	Boston	United States	Orpheum Theatre
19 October 1997	New Brunswick	United States	State Theatre
21 October 1997	Albany	United States	Palace Theatre
22 October 1997	Fairfax	United States	Patriot Center
24 October 1997	Upper Darby	United States	Tower Theatre
25 October 1997	Upper Darby	United States	Tower Theatre
26 October 1997	Upper Darby	United States	Tower Theatre
28 October 1997	Hershey	United States	Hersheypark Arena
29 October 1997	New York City	United States	Beacon Theatre
30 October 1997	New York City	United States	Beacon Theatre
31 October 1997	New York City	United States	Beacon Theatre
2 November 1997	Pittsburgh	United States	A. J. Palumbo Center
3 November 1997	Detroit	United States	Fox Theatre
5 November 1997	Grand Rapids	United States	Van Andel Arena
6 November 1997	Toronto	Canada	Massey Hall
7 November 1997	Toronto	Canada	Massey Hall
8 November 1997	Syracuse	United States	Landmark Theatre
9 November 1997	Poughkeepsie	United States	Mid-Hudson Civic Center
10 November 1997	Buffalo	United States	Shea's Performing Arts Center
12 November 1997	Cleveland	United States	Cleveland Music Hall
13 November 1997	Merrillville	United States	Star Plaza Theatre
14 November 1997	Rosemont	United States	Rosemont Theater
15 November 1997	Milwaukee	United States	Riverside Theater
18 November 1997	Minneapolis	United States	State Theatre
20 November 1997	Indianapolis	United States	Murat Centre
21 November 1997	Louisville	United States	Palace Theatre
22 November 1997	Cincinnati	United States	Taft Theatre
23 November 1997	Columbus	United States	Veterans Memorial Auditorium
25 November 1997	St. Louis	United States	Fox Theatre
26 November 1997	Tulsa	United States	Brady Theater
28 November 1997	Dallas	United States	Bronco Bowl
29 November 1997	Houston	United States	Aerial Theater
30 November 1997	San Antonio	United States	Majestic Theatre
2 December 1997	Denver	United States	Buell Theater
5 December 1997	Phoenix	United States	Union Hall
6 December 1997	Las Vegas	United States	The Joint
7 December 1997	Universal City	United States	Universal Amphitheatre
~~8 December 1997~~	Fresno	United States	Saroyan Theater
9 December 1997	San Diego	United States	San Diego Civic Theater
11 December 1997	Sacramento	United States	Memorial Auditorium
12 December 1997	San Francisco	United States	Warfield Theatre
13 December 1997	San Francisco	United States	Warfield Theatre
14 December 1997	San Jose	United States	American Musical Theatre
~~16 December 1997~~	Santa Barbara	United States	Arlington Theater
~~2 January 1998~~	Portland	United States	Aladdin Theater
~~3 January 1998~~	Seattle	United States	Paramount Theater
~~4 January 1998~~	Seattle	United States	Paramount Theater
~~5 January 1998~~	Vancouver	Canada	Queen Elizabeth Theater
~~6 January 1998~~	Vancouver	Canada	Queen Elizabeth Theater
~~8 January 1998~~	Edmonton	Canada	Jubilee Auditorium
~~9 January 1998~~	Calgary	Canada	Singer Concert Hall
~~11 January 1998~~	Saskatoon	Canada	Centennial Auditorium
~~12 January 1998~~	Regina	Canada	Regina Arts Center
~~14 January 1998~~	Winnipeg	Canada	Walker Theater
~~16 January 1998~~	Montreal	Canada	St Denis Theater
~~17 January 1998~~	Quebec City	Canada	Grand Theater
Europe
26 February 1998	Manchester	England	Apollo Theatre
27 February 1998	Newcastle	England	Newcastle City Hall
28 February 1998	Glasgow	Scotland	Clyde Auditorium
1 March 1998	Nottingham	England	Royal Concert Hall
3 March 1998	Bournemouth	England	Bournemouth International Centre
4 March 1998	London	England	Labatt's Apollo Hammersmith
5 March 1998	London	England	Labatt's Apollo Hammersmith
6 March 1998	Paris	France	Palais des Congrès
7 March 1998	Paris	France	Fnac store (forum)
8 March 1998	Utrecht	Netherlands	Muzickcentrum Vredenburg
9 March 1998	Utrecht	Netherlands	Muzickcentrum Vredenburg
10 March 1998	Frankfurt	Germany	Jahrhunderthalle Hoechst
11 March 1998	Düsseldorf	Germany	Philipshalle
13 March 1998	Zurich	Switzerland	Kongresshaus
14 March 1998	Milan	Italy	Teatro Lirico
16 March 1998	Berlin	Germany	Internationales Congress Centrum Berlins
17 March 1998	Dresden	Germany	Kulturpalast Dresden
18 March 1998	Mannheim	Germany	Mozartsaal Im Rosengarten
20 March 1998	Stuttgart	Germany	Bethovensaal
21 March 1998	Halle	Germany	Steintor Variete
22 March 1998	Hamburg	Germany	Congress Center Hamburg
23 March 1998	Hanover	Germany	Musikhalle Hanover
24 March 1998	Bayreuth	Germany	Oberfrankenhalle
26 March 1998	Warsaw	Poland	Sala Kongresowa
27 March 1998	Katowice	Poland	Spodek
28 March 1998	Prague	Czech Republic	Mala Sportovni Hala
29 March 1998	Poznań	Poland	Sala Arena
31 March 1998	Budapest	Hungary	Budapest Sportcsarnok
1 April 1998	Trieste	Italy	Palasport Di Chiarbola
2 April 1998	Vienna	Austria	Libro Music Hall
3 April 1998	Munich	Germany	Circus Krone
~~4 April 1998~~	Ravensburg	Germany	Oberschwabben Hall
6 April 1998	Brussels	Belgium	Vorst Nationaal
7 April 1998	Lille	France	Zénith de Lille
8 April 1998	Differdange	Luxembourg	Centre Sportif de Differdange
10 April 1998	Groningen	Netherlands	Martinihal
11 April 1998	Eindhoven	Netherlands	Muzickcentrum Frits Philips
13 April 1998	Birmingham	England	Symphony Hall
14 April 1998	Cardiff	Wales	Cardiff International Arena
15 April 1998	Plymouth	England	Plymouth Pavilion
16 April 1998	Birmingham	England	Symphony Hall
17 April 1998	Edinburgh	Scotland	Playhouse Theatre
19 April 1998	Liverpool	England	Empire Theatre
20 April 1998	Sheffield	England	Sheffield City Hall
21 April 1998	Brighton	England	Brighton Dome
22 April 1998	Croydon	England	Fairfield Hall
24 April 1998	London	England	Labatt's Apollo Hammersmith
South America and Mexico
7 May 1998	São Paulo	Brazil	Olímpia
8 May 1998	São Paulo	Brazil	Olímpia
9 May 1998	São Paulo	Brazil	Olímpia
10 May 1998	Belo Horizonte	Brazil	Estacionamento do Minas Shopping
12 May 1998	Rio de Janeiro	Brazil	Metropolitan
14 May 1998	Buenos Aires	Argentina	Obras Sanitarias Stadium
15 May 1998	Buenos Aires	Argentina	Obras Sanitarias Stadium
16 May 1998	Buenos Aires	Argentina	Obras Sanitarias Stadium
19 May 1998	Porto Alegre	Brazil	Bar Opiniao
~~20 May 1998~~	Curitiba	Brazil	Cutiriba Forum
21 May 1998	Santiago	Chile	Teatro Monumental
25 May 1998	Mexico City	Mexico	National Auditorium
26 May 1998	Mexico City	Mexico	National Auditorium
28 May 1998	Monterrey	Mexico	Auditorio Coca-Cola
United States and Canada
18 June 1998	Toronto	Canada	Molson Amphitheatre
19 June 1998	Montreal	Canada	Parc Des Iles
20 June 1998	Quebec City	Canada	Hippodrome de Quebec
22 June 1998	Virginia Beach	United States	Virginia Beach Amphitheatre
23 June 1998	Bristow	United States	Nissan Pavilion
24 June 1998	Pittsburgh	United States	IC Light Amphitheatre
26 June 1998	Holmdel	United States	PNC Bank Arts Center
27 June 1998	Camden	United States	Sony Music Center
28 June 1998	Scranton	United States	Montage Mountain Amphitheater
29 June 1998	New York City	United States	Hard Rock Cafe
30 June 1998	Boston	United States	Harborlights Pavilion
1 July 1998	Wallingford	United States	Oakdale Theatre
2 July 1998	Wantagh	United States	Jones Beach Amphitheatre
4 July 1998	Canandaigua	United States	Finger Lakes Performing Arts Center
5 July 1998	Clarkston	United States	Pine Knob Music Theatre
6 July 1998	Cincinnati	United States	Riverbend Music Center
7 July 1998	Cuyahoga Falls	United States	Blossom Music Center
9 July 1998	Tinley Park	United States	New World Music Theatre
10 July 1998	Walker	United States	Moondance Ranch Jam
11 July 1998	Milwaukee	United States	Marcus Amphitheatre
12 July 1998	Noblesville	United States	Deer Creek Music Center
14 July 1998	Greenwood Village	United States	Fiddler's Green Amphitheatre
15 July 1998	West Valley City	United States	E Center
17 July 1998	Vancouver	Canada	General Motors Place
18 July 1998	Woodinville	United States	Chateau Ste. Michelle
20 July 1998	Reno	United States	Reno-Hilton Amphitheater
21 July 1998	Concord	United States	Concord Pavilion
22 July 1998	San Diego	United States	Open Air Theatre
24 July 1998	Universal City	United States	Universal Amphitheatre
25 July 1998	Las Vegas	United States	The Joint
26 July 1998	Phoenix	United States	Desert Sky Pavilion
27 July 1998	El Paso	United States	Chavez Theatre
28 July 1998	Santa Fe	United States	Paolo Soleri Amphitheatre
30 July 1998	Dallas	United States	Starplex Amphitheatre
31 July 1998	The Woodlands	United States	Cynthia Woods Mitchell Pavilion
1 August 1998	Bee Cave	United States	The Backyard
2 August 1998	San Antonio	United States	Municipal Auditorium
4 August 1998	Memphis	United States	Mud Island Amphitheatre
5 August 1998	Nashville	United States	Starwood Amphitheatre
6 August 1998	Atlanta	United States	Chastain Park
7 August 1998	Tampa	United States	Tampa Bay Performing Arts Center
8 August 1998	West Palm Beach	United States	Coral Sky Amphitheatre
Asia
8 October 1998	Tokyo	Japan	Shibuya Koukaidou
9 October 1998	Tokyo	Japan	Shibuya Koukaidou
11 October 1998	Kawaguchi	Japan	Kawaguchi LILIA Main Hall
13 October 1998	Nagoya	Japan	Nagoya-shi Koukaido
14 October 1998	Osaka	Japan	Kouseinennkin Kaikan

== The Ladder Tour ==
The Ladder Tour
- World tour by Yes
- Location: United States, Canada, Europe, South America
- Associated album: The Ladder
- Start date: 6 September 1999
- End date: 25 March 2000
- Legs: 3
- No. of shows: 83 (87 scheduled)

Lineup:

- Jon Anderson – vocals, harp
- Steve Howe – guitars, vocals
- Billy Sherwood – guitars, vocals
- Igor Khoroshev – keyboards, vocals
- Chris Squire – bass, vocals
- Alan White – drums, percussion

Setlist:

- "Yours Is No Disgrace" (Anderson, Squire, Howe, Kaye, Bruford)
- "America" (Simon) (Dropped after 24 September 1999)
- "Time and a Word" (excerpt) (Anderson, Foster)
- "Homeworld (The Ladder)" (Anderson, Squire, Howe, White, Sherwood, Khoroshev)
- "Perpetual Change" (Anderson, Squire)
- "Lightning Strikes" (Anderson, Squire, Howe, White, Sherwood, Khoroshev)
- "New Language" (Anderson, Squire, Howe, White, Sherwood, Khoroshev) (replaced by "The Messenger" starting 23 October 1999)
- "Ritual (Nous Sommes du Soleil)" (excerpt) (Anderson, Squire, Howe, Wakeman, White)
- "And You and I" (Anderson, Squire, Howe, Bruford) (Added on 16 September 1999)
- "It Will Be a Good Day (The River)" (Anderson, Squire, Howe, White, Sherwood, Khoroshev)
- "Face to Face" (Anderson, Squire, Howe, White, Sherwood, Khoroshev) (added on 15 October 1999)
- "Hearts" (Anderson, Rabin, Kaye, Squire, White) (Dropped after 4 March 2000)
- "Nine Voices (Longwalker)" (Anderson, Squire, Howe, White, Sherwood, Khoroshev) (dropped after 9 November 1999)
- "Awaken" (Anderson, Howe) (Added on 15 October 1999)
- "To Be Alive (Hep Yadda)" (Anderson, Squire, Howe, White, Sherwood, Khoroshev) (dropped after 12 September 1999)
- "I've Seen All Good People" (Anderson, Squire)
- Steve Howe solo section (Howe)
- "Cinema" (Rabin, Squire, White, Kaye) (Added on 15 October 1999)
- "Owner of a Lonely Heart" (Anderson, Rabin, Squire, Horn)
- "Roundabout" (Anderson, Howe)

Also occasionally played were:

- "Close to the Edge" (Anderson, Howe) (Played on 18, 21, 22, 24 September 1999 and 29, 30, 31 October 1999)
- "Leaves of Green" (Anderson, Squire, Howe, Wakeman, White) (Played on 15 October 1999 and 19 October 1999)
- "Long Distance Runaround" (Anderson) (Played on 6, 16, 18, 21, and 22 September 1999 and 23, 25 March 2000)
- "Soon" (Anderson) (Played on 6 September 1999)
- "Survival" (Played on 12 September 1999)

Date	City	Country	Venue
South America and Mexico
6 September 1999	Rio de Janeiro	Brazil	Rio Arena
8 September 1999	São Paulo	Brazil	Olímpia
9 September 1999	São Paulo	Brazil	Olímpia
12 September 1999	Buenos Aires	Argentina	Estadio Luna Park
~~14 September 1999~~	Santiago	Chile	Estadio Chile
16 September 1999	Lima	Peru	Muello Uno
18 September 1999	San Pedro	Costa Rica	San Pedro Jazz Cafe
21 September 1999	Caracas	Venezuela	Teresa Carreño Cultural Complex
22 September 1999	Caracas	Venezuela	Teresa Carreño Cultural Complex
24 September 1999	Mexico City	Mexico	Palacio de los Deportes
United States and Canada
15 October 1999	North Myrtle Beach	United States	House of Blues
16 October 1999	Atlanta	United States	The Tabernacle
18 October 1999	Tampa	United States	The David A. Straz Jr. Center for the Performing Arts
19 October 1999	Tampa	United States	The David A. Straz Jr. Center for the Performing Arts
21 October 1999	Sunrise	United States	Sunrise Musical Theatre
22 October 1999	Lake Buena Vista	United States	House of Blues
23 October 1999	Jacksonville	United States	Florida Theatre
25 October 1999	New Orleans	United States	House of Blues
26 October 1999	Houston	United States	Aerial Theater
29 October 1999	Phoenix	United States	Union Hall
30 October 1999	Anaheim	United States	Sun Theatre
31 October 1999	Las Vegas	United States	House of Blues
2 November 1999	West Hollywood	United States	House of Blues
3 November 1999	West Hollywood	United States	House of Blues
4 November 1999	West Hollywood	United States	House of Blues
6 November 1999	San Francisco	United States	Warfield Theatre
7 November 1999	San Francisco	United States	Warfield Theatre
9 November 1999	Seattle	United States	Paramount Theatre
12 November 1999	Minneapolis	United States	Orpheum Theatre
13 November 1999	Milwaukee	United States	Milwaukee Auditorium
15 November 1999	Chicago	United States	Riviera Theatre
16 November 1999	Chicago	United States	Riviera Theatre
17 November 1999	Chicago	United States	Riviera Theatre
19 November 1999	Royal Oak	United States	Royal Oak Music Theatre
20 November 1999	Toledo	United States	SeaGate Convention Centre
21 November 1999	Cincinnati	United States	Taft Theatre
23 November 1999	Rochester	United States	Rochester Auditorium
24 November 1999	Cleveland	United States	Agora Theatre
26 November 1999	New Brunswick	United States	State Theatre
27 November 1999	Ledyard	United States	Fox Theatre
28 November 1999	Wallingford	United States	Oakdale Theatre
30 November 1999	Wilkes-Barre	United States	The F.M. Kirby Center for the Performing Arts
1 December 1999	Pittsburgh	United States	A. J. Palumbo Center
2 December 1999	Mount Pleasant	United States	Soaring Eagle Casino
4 December 1999	Toronto	Canada	Massey Hall
5 December 1999	Montreal	Canada	Métropolis
7 December 1999	New York City	United States	Beacon Theatre
8 December 1999	New York City	United States	Beacon Theatre
9 December 1999	New York City	United States	Beacon Theatre
11 December 1999	Boston	United States	Orpheum Theatre
12 December 1999	Upper Darby	United States	Tower Theatre
13 December 1999	Upper Darby	United States	Tower Theatre
Europe
6 February 2000	Dublin	Ireland	National Concert Hall
~~7 February 2000~~	Birmingham	England	Symphony Hall
8 February 2000	Birmingham	England	Symphony Hall
10 February 2000	Sheffield	England	Sheffield City Hall
11 February 2000	Cardiff	Wales	Cardiff International Arena
12 February 2000	Bournemouth	England	Windsor Hall
13 February 2000	Manchester	England	Apollo Theatre
14 February 2000	Liverpool	England	Empire Theatre
16 February 2000	Nottingham	England	Royal Concert Hall
17 February 2000	Glasgow	Scotland	Clyde Auditorium
19 February 2000	London	England	Royal Albert Hall
20 February 2000	London	England	Royal Albert Hall
23 February 2000	Porto	Portugal	Coliseu do Porto
24 February 2000	Lisbon	Portugal	Pavilhao Atlantico
25 February 2000	Madrid	Spain	La Riviera
26 February 2000	Barcelona	Spain	El Teatro De Zeleste
28 February 2000	Paris	France	L'Olympia
29 February 2000	Brussels	Belgium	Vorst Nationaal
1 March 2000	Utrecht	Netherlands	Muzickcentrum Vredenburg
2 March 2000	Utrecht	Netherlands	Muzickcentrum Vredenburg
4 March 2000	Bologna	Italy	PalaSavena
~~5 March 2000~~	Sull'Oglio	Italy	Pala-Us
~~6 March 2000~~	Milan	Italy	Forum di Assago
~~7 March 2000~~	Florence	Italy	Verdi Theater
9 March 2000	Zurich	Switzerland	Kongresshaus Zurich
11 March 2000	Offenbach am Main	Germany	Stadhalle
12 March 2000	Cologne	Germany	Palladium Koln
13 March 2000	Stuttgart	Germany	Kultur Und Kongresszentrum Liederhalle
15 March 2000	Leipzig	Germany	Haus Auensee
16 March 2000	Berlin	Germany	ColumbiaHalle
17 March 2000	Furth	Germany	Stadttheater Furth
19 March 2000	Vienna	Austria	Libro Music Hall
20 March 2000	Ljubljana	Slovenia	Hala Tivoli
23 March 2000	Sofia	Bulgaria	Winter Sports Palace
25 March 2000	Bucharest	Romania	Sala Palatului
