= Caller =

Caller may refer to:

- Caller (telecommunications), a party that originates a call
- "gentlement callers", a term in courtship
- Caller (dancing), a person that calls dance figures in round dances and square dances
- Caller, the Catalan equivalent of Cagliari
- A software program or procedure that invokes a subroutine

== See also ==
- The Caller (disambiguation)
- Call (disambiguation)
- Calling (disambiguation)
