= Talk (Yes album) =

Studio album by Yes
- Released: 21 March 1994
- Recorded: 1992–1993
- Studios: The Jacaranda Room, Hollywood; A&M, Hollywood
- Genres: Pop rock; progressive rock
- Length: 54:31
- Label: Victory Music
- Producer: Trevor Rabin

Yes chronology
Highlights: The Very Best of Yes (1993)	Talk (1994)	Keys to Ascension (1996)

Singles from Talk
- 1. "The Calling" Released: 16 March 1994

Talk is the fourteenth studio album by the English progressive rock band Yes. It was released on 21 March 1994 by Victory Music, and stands as the final studio release by Yes to feature guitarist Trevor Rabin and keyboardist Tony Kaye.

Following the conclusion of the band's large-scale Union Tour in 1992, record executive and longtime Yes associate Phil Carson approached the group's 1980s lineup to record a new album for his newly established independent label, Victory Music. Seeking to avoid the internal friction of previous recording sessions where singer Jon Anderson was excluded from early tracking, Rabin intentionally restructured the band's creative dynamic by collaborating closely with Anderson from the project's inception. Coordinated across a synchronised cluster of four Apple Macintosh computers running early Digital Performer software, Talk achieved historical significance as one of the very first rock albums to be recorded, edited, and mixed entirely digitally via direct-to-disk non-linear hard drives. The album's minimalist cover design by pop artist Peter Max marked a deliberate visual departure from the band's traditional artwork by Roger Dean.

Upon release, the album underperformed commercially, peaking at number 20 in the UK and number 33 in the US, making it the band's lowest-charting studio release in the United States since The Yes Album (1971). Its commercial traction was severely hindered by the subsequent bankruptcy of Victory Music, which left the album with minimal promotion. Contemporary music critics gave the album mostly negative reviews, largely dismissing its dense, processed production and signature arena rock styling during the height of the alternative rock and grunge movements; however, retrospective assessments have been considerably more favourable.

Two tracks were released as singles: "The Calling" and "Walls", which peaked at number 3 and number 24 respectively on the Billboard Hot Mainstream Rock Tracks chart. The 82-date tour in 1994 saw the band joined by future full-time member Billy Sherwood on additional guitars and keyboards, who was hired as an insurance policy regarding Squire's health, and featured an experimental headphone broadcast sound system named Concertsonics. Following its conclusion, Rabin and Kaye permanently left the group, prompting the remaining core trio of Anderson, Squire, and Alan White to reunite with Steve Howe and Rick Wakeman to reform the band's classic lineup.

== Background and writing ==
In March 1992, Yes concluded their Union Tour, which had featured an extensive eight-member lineup. For their next studio album, former Atlantic Records executive and long-time band associate Phil Carson approached the group's 1980s lineup, consisting of Jon Anderson, Chris Squire, Trevor Rabin, Alan White, and Tony Kaye. This specific iteration had previously produced the band's most commercially successful albums, 90125 (1983) and Big Generator (1987). Carson invited them to record for Victory Music, an independent label he had established in partnership with JVC. Because Rabin and keyboardist Rick Wakeman had developed a strong rapport during the previous tour, Carson also suggested including Wakeman in the new project. However, guitarist Steve Howe criticised the decision to exclude himself and drummer Bill Bruford, calling the omission of two core members "very silly." Howe and Bruford subsequently departed to resume their solo careers following a brief promotional tour for the orchestral album Symphonic Music of Yes (1993). This promotional cycle included an American live television appearance where Howe and Bruford performed "Roundabout" as a trio with a session bassist, a performance later described by Prog magazine as a "car-crash moment." By May 1993, Wakeman also withdrew from the project after Carson and band manager Tony Dimitriades required him to cut ties with his existing management, an ultimatum Wakeman refused to meet.

With a recording deal secured, Rabin joined Anderson at a motel in San Clemente, California to write new material. Over roughly two weeks, they composed a batch of songs from scratch and developed individual ideas using an acoustic guitar and two boomboxes. This marked the first time since his 1983 return to the group that Anderson had been involved in songwriting from a project's inception; on previous records, his late-stage involvement had restricted his creative input. Rabin recognised the importance of building a cohesive musical partnership for Talk. Reflecting on Big Generator, Rabin noted Anderson's past frustration at being handed completed songs to sing over, explaining: "I realised, the best possible way is [ ... ] I need to work really closely with him to provide him the best possible platform to sing on [ ... ] which led to its being a better album for us". Anderson felt this immediate collaboration made it feel like "a true Yes album", recalling that the direction of the record—including the decision to feature a long-form track—was established within four days. Squire intentionally stepped back from the initial songwriting to grant Rabin and Anderson the space to establish material they both supported. Though he ultimately received co-writing credits on "The Calling" and "Real Love", Squire expressed that he was "very happy" with the resulting tracks. Early working titles for the album included Blueprint and Crunching Numbers.

== Recording ==
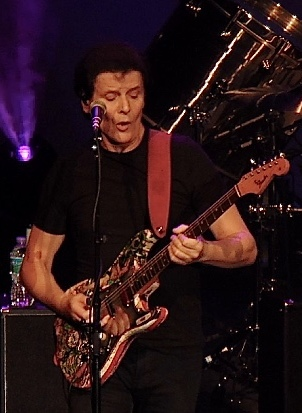
Trevor Rabin, who produced, engineered, and co-wrote Talk—his final studio album with Yes. He is pictured here performing live in 2017.

The majority of Talk was recorded and mixed at Rabin's home studio in Hollywood, California, which he named The Jacaranda Room. (Note: In Rabin's native South Africa, the Jacaranda is a prominent urban flowering tree.) Additional recording sessions took place at A&M Recording Studios in Hollywood. Rabin assumed full responsibility for the album's production, opting for digital non-linear recording and editing over traditional analogue tape, which allowed audio tracks to be recorded directly onto hard drives in real time. To facilitate the project, Rabin upgraded his home studio with a DDA Profile mixing console. He recalled that while onlookers "thought I was nuts", the rest of the band was highly supportive of the approach. According to Rabin, Kaye was particularly enthusiastic, acting "almost as a kind of co-producer"; though Kaye is credited solely with playing the Hammond organ, Rabin emphasised that his creative input was significantly greater.

Following a phase of technical research, Rabin and sound engineer Michael Jay linked four Apple Macintosh computers together using a single IBM personal computer to act as a central file server. Each Macintosh ran the digital audio workstation software Digital Performer, developed by Mark of the Unicorn, with data split across external Dynatek hard drives. Because they were working with early digital audio workstation software, Rabin and Jay routinely encountered software bugs; they reported these errors and suggested missing functions directly to the software's programmers, who wrote custom code patches and updated the studio's software overnight. Anderson attributed the album's lengthy production timeline to these persistent digital teething problems. Conversely, Rabin noted that the ability to non-destructively edit tracks resulted in fewer required takes, keeping the band's performances fresh.

Rabin later clarified that the album relied entirely on live instrumentation, correcting a contemporary public misconception that recording into a computer implied the music was synthetic or computerised. He noted that Squire initially grew frustrated with the software errors inherent to the digital process, though the bassist ultimately admitted he preferred the high-fidelity punch of his bass via direct-disk recording over the digital tape systems he had used previously. Squire recorded his parts using his signature Rickenbacker bass, a Tobias four-string, a custom Mouradian bass, and Rabin's Casio digital guitar routed through a synthesiser.

The studio's initial 5.5 GB hard drive storage layout quickly proved insufficient. To capture White's drums in real time, the team utilised an estimated 27 microphones, choosing to dedicate independent tracks to the kit in the final mix rather than sub-mixing them down. This design caused individual song project folders to swell to roughly 350 MB each; in its unedited, raw state, the total album data footprint exceeded 34 GB, requiring an immense financial investment in storage hardware. Production was temporarily halted in January 1994 following the Northridge earthquake to shield the delicate computer hardware from structural damage and aftershocks. The completed album was mastered by Stephen Marcussen at Precision Mastering in Los Angeles.

== Artwork ==
The album's cover art and original logo concept were designed by German-American pop artist Peter Max, while Paul Rivas served as the project's art director. The design marked a deliberate departure from the fantastical imagery of long-time collaborator Roger Dean, and bypassed the band's traditional, co-owned "bubble" logotype in favour of Max's minimalist, contemporary styling. Although Squire initially expressed reservations about the abstract direction of the new design, he later noted that the imagery had grown on him.

The album's liner notes feature a dedication "to all Yes fans". The inner packaging also includes the tongue-in-cheek warning: "P.S. 'Caution' Extreme Digital Dynamic Range", highlighting that Talk was captured entirely via direct-to-disk digital recording software. Early commercial pressings contained a layout misprint in the manufacturing credits, which erroneously attributed the songwriting layout solely to Jon Anderson and Trevor Rabin, accidentally omitting the credits for Squire, Alan White, and Tony Kaye before the packaging layout was corrected.

== Songs ==
Album opener "The Calling" spans nearly seven minutes on the standard release and over eight minutes on its extended version. Developed around an introductory guitar riff, the track features an arena rock production style driven by Rabin's guitar and Kaye's prominent Hammond organ lines. The arrangement utilises a dense three-part vocal harmony performed simultaneously by Anderson, Rabin, and Squire. Rabin did not intend for the lyrics to convey a moralising message, instead envisioning the song as an anthem for human unity. Anderson noted that the thematic content was inspired by the philosophical concept of "local history"—the current three-thousand-year window of human civilisation, outside of which mankind has little long-term historical awareness.

"I Am Waiting" alternates between quiet acoustic guitar passages paired with Anderson's soft vocals, and heavy, melodic electric guitar riffs driven by a prominent backbeat from White. Rabin composed the track rapidly, completing the musical arrangement in a single day. He recalled that Anderson took an immediate liking to the arrangement, subsequently writing the lyrics and recording the majority of his lead vocals that same afternoon. Anderson singled out "I Am Waiting" as a personal favourite from Talk, describing it as "real pure music" due to the spontaneous nature of its creation.

"Real Love" was primarily written by Squire, with Kaye describing its sound as "pretty heavy." Critics have noted the song for its prominent heavy rock guitar styling and production bombast, making it the only track on Talk where the musical composition was driven predominantly by Squire's bassline arrangement. The lyrics were partly inspired by Rabin's reading of A Brief History of Time by British physicist Stephen Hawking, which is directly referenced in the line: "Far away in the depths of Hawking's mind [ ... ] To the animal, primalistic grind".

"State of Play" originated when an emergency services vehicle passed Rabin with its siren sounding. He recalled being fascinated by the audio shift: "I thought that's an amazing sound with the Doppler effect and everything as it goes by. That gave me the idea for the screeching kind of guitar sound in the beginning". Musically, the track features a stylistic fusion; Squire noted it was a conscious effort by the band to blend a hip-hop groove with heavy rock guitars. White praised the vocal performances of Anderson, Rabin, and Squire, highlighting its "great musicianship all round".

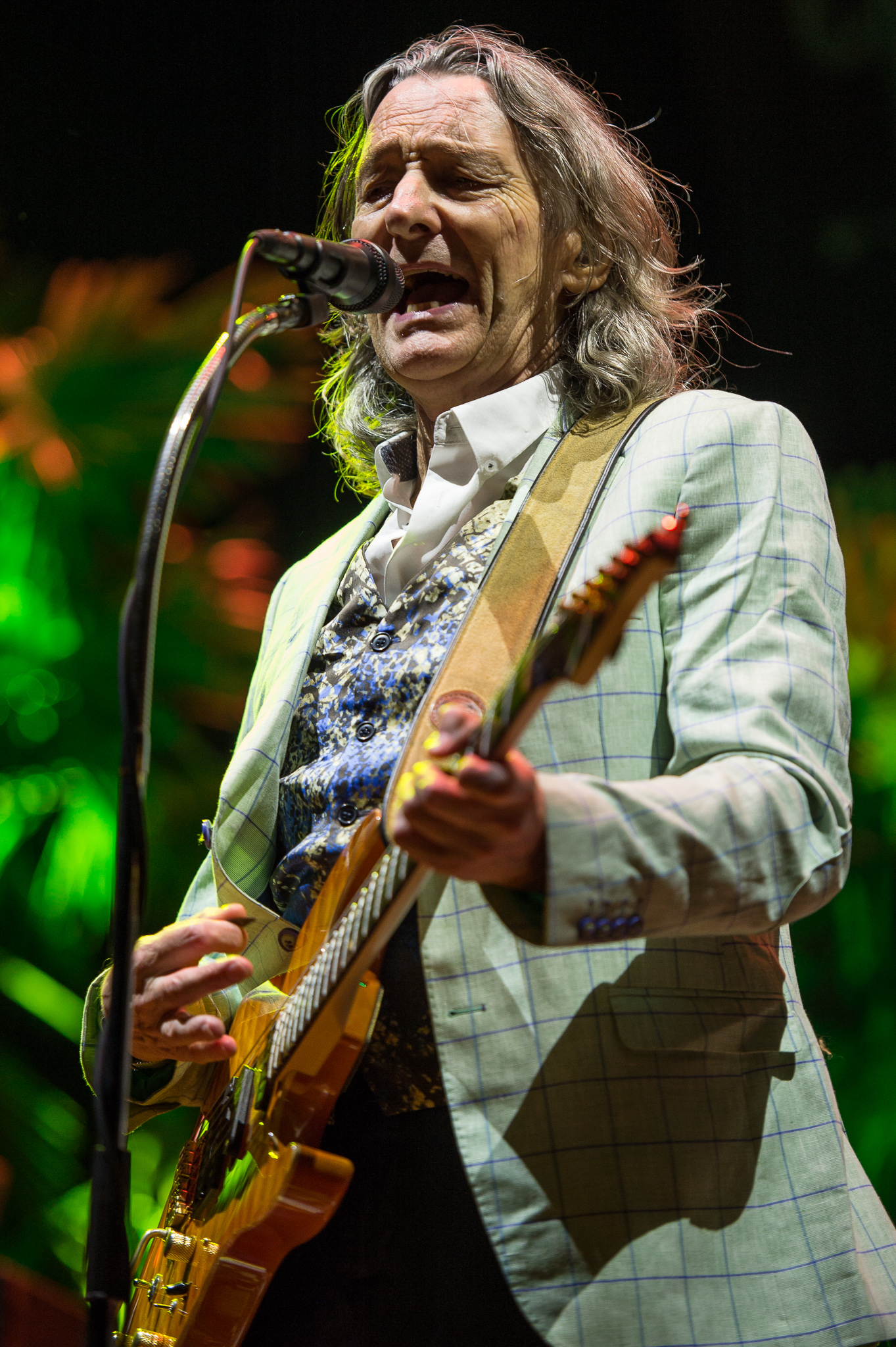
Rabin co-wrote "Walls" with Supertramp vocalist Roger Hodgson, who also sang on its original demo.

"Walls" was the final track produced for Talk. Rabin co-wrote the music with former Supertramp vocalist Roger Hodgson, who had previously declined an offer to replace Anderson as Yes's lead singer after the Big Generator (1987) tour. The pair originally composed and documented the track as a duet demo in 1990, which was later included on Rabin's archival compilation album 90124 (2003).

"Where Will You Be" was originally composed by Rabin as an instrumental signature theme for an unreleased Australian film. Musically, it marks a stylistic departure for the album, featuring an atmospheric, polyrhythmic, and pseudo-orchestral arrangement driven by an electronic synth-bass loop instead of Squire's traditional bass guitar. Rabin praised Anderson's lyrical contributions to the track, describing them as some of his best work on Talk. A 1991 archival demo version of the track, featuring Hodgson on backing vocals, was later released on Rabin's compilation album 90124 (2003).

The fifteen-minute "Endless Dream" is the band's longest recorded studio track since "Awaken" on Going for the One (1977). The recurring piano riff that opens the instrumental introduction, "Silent Spring", originated from a longer piece Rabin originally composed for a film score before repurposing it for Yes; the segment subsequently shifts into an intricate 5/4 time signature. The ambient, atmospheric section in the second part, "Talk", features an instrumental passage adapted from an orchestral piece Rabin had written titled "October", which was rendered with digital instrumentation for the album. Anderson praised the track as being "as good as anything" the band had ever recorded, highlighting the "remarkable" arrangement of the final "Endless Dream" movement and comparing its scope to the band's 1970s epics, "Close to the Edge" and "Awaken". White similarly praised the track, citing it as a major high point of the recording sessions.

== Release ==
On 16 March 1994, Yes held a premiere party radio broadcast for Talk, hosted by Bob Coburn at the original Hard Rock Cafe in Hollywood, California. A second broadcast followed on 21 March, the day of the album's release. The album underperformed commercially, reaching number 20 on the UK Albums Chart and number 33 on the US Billboard 200; the latter marked their lowest-charting studio release in the United States since The Yes Album (1971). Anderson and Rabin attributed the disappointing performance to the sudden financial collapse of Victory Music, which completely halted the album's ongoing promotion. White attributed it to a lack of forethought from the label, and felt it could have done more to promote it. Carson later lamented the timing of the release, stating: "[It] was probably one of the best albums they have ever done ... But of course it was totally at the wrong time. It sold around 300,000 around the world but nothing like that it should have". Victory Music went bankrupt later that year, leading to a general scarcity of physical copies of the album for years afterward.

Two tracks were released as singles: "The Calling" and "Walls", which peaked at number 3 and number 24 respectively on the Billboard Hot Mainstream Rock Tracks chart.

=== Reissues ===
In November 1994, the band released Yes Active, an interactive CD-ROM containing the full album supplemented by bonus video material, band interviews, and isolated audio performance tracks.

Talk was reissued as a Collector's Edition in April 2002 by Spitfire Records. This edition combined the three sub-movements of "Endless Dream" into a single un-indexed track, added an extended version of "The Calling", and featured liner notes written by rock journalist and Yes biographer Chris Welch. In 2006, the album was packaged alongside other era releases in the box set Essentially Yes by Eagle Records.

To commemorate the album's 30th anniversary, Spirit of Unicorn Music released a digitally remastered deluxe edition on 24 May 2024. Billed in press coverage as the "great lost Yes album" due to its years spent out of print, the project was remastered by audio engineer Andy Pierce. The four-disc box set features the original album alongside various single edits, alternative instrumental mixes, studio demos, and a previously unreleased live concert recorded in Canandaigua, New York, on 19 June 1994.

== Critical reception ==
Professional ratings
Review scores
Source	Rating
AllMusic	3/5 stars
Entertainment Weekly	C−
Rolling Stone	2/5 stars
The Rolling Stone Album Guide	2.5/5 stars

Upon release, Talk received a mostly negative response from contemporary critics, as traditional progressive rock was largely out of favour with music journalists during the height of the alternative rock and grunge movements. Reviewing the album for the British music magazine Q, critic Mark Webbon gave the album a mixed review; while he praised the band's technical ambition and the return to collaborative tracking, he critiqued the end product as sounding overly sterile and over-processed by Rabin's extensive digital tracking setup. Similarly, the UK publication Vox dismissed the record, characterizing its dense, computerised instrumentation as a misstep during an era favoring raw guitar styles.

American publication Rolling Stone awarded it a two out of five-star rating, writing that the music felt calculated and lacked the organic energy of the band's earlier catalog. In a famously terse review for Musician, the magazine evaluated the record with just two words: "Shut up". Reflecting on the comment, Rabin remarked: "I laughed at first [ ... ] But then I thought a review like that doesn't do anybody any good. We all get negative reviews of albums, and if the criticism is negative, and if it's constructive criticism, often it's something you can feed off". Tom Sinclair of Entertainment Weekly graded the album a C−, criticising its "annoying castrati vocals, the bombastic arena-rock flourishes, the cloying New Age sentiments" and what he described as "sterile classicism".

Retrospective assessments have been significantly more favourable, with many music critics re-evaluating the record as an overlooked milestone in the band's catalog. In a review for AllMusic, Steven McDonald rated Talk three out of five stars, praising the "new attitude powering the band, and a few surprises hidden away in the songs". McDonald concluded that "this album is fun and extremely well done", noting it features "some really nifty songs that stick in the mind, from the opening 'The Calling' to the closing 16-minute 'Endless Dream'". Reviewing the 2024 anniversary box set, Nick DeRiso of Something Else! Reviews noted that the record had aged considerably better than contemporary critics suggested. DeRiso highlighted the live material from the 1994 tour for capturing the unmitigated performance power of the Squire and White rhythm section, adding that the studio compilation finally filled a significant historical gap for fans.

== Tour and aftermath ==
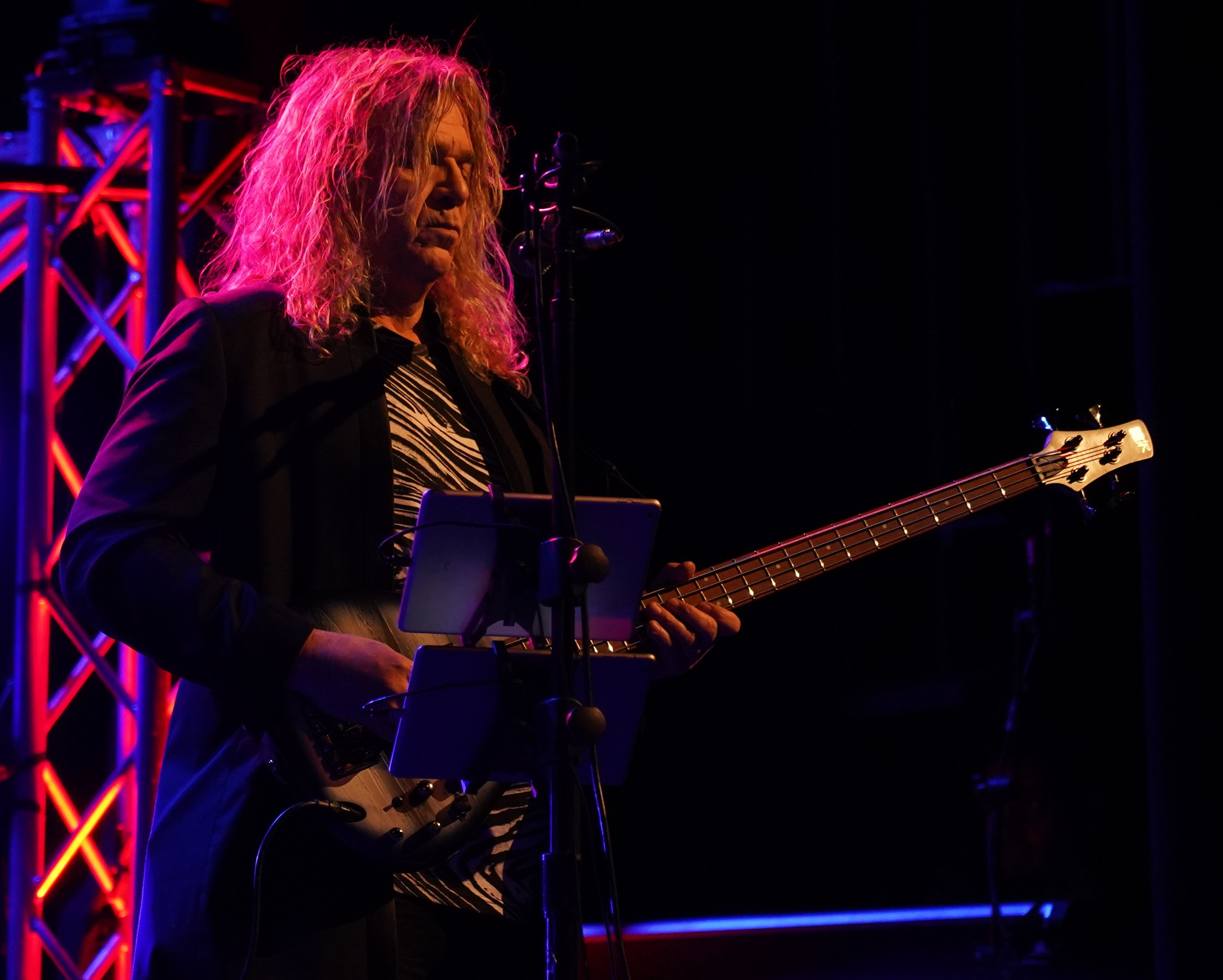
Billy Sherwood performing live with Yes in 2024. Sherwood first integrated into the group's touring lineup three decades earlier during the 1994 Talk tour.

Talk was supported by an 82-date tour from June to October 1994 across North America, South America, and Japan. The live lineup included multi-instrumentalist Billy Sherwood on guitars, keyboards, and backing vocals. Sherwood was primarily brought on as an insurance policy in the event that Squire's health problems prevented him from performing, while also helping to replicate the complex parts featured on the album. Sherwood later joined the band officially from 1997 to 2000, and returned in 2015 following Squire's death.

To push technological boundaries on the road, Yes deployed a specialised quadraphonic live PA system alongside an experimental broadcast technique named Concertsonics. Supervised by Rabin in conjunction with long-time sound associates Clair Bros. Audio, Concertsonics allowed ticket holders seated within a designated, optimised 25-foot-deep section of the arena to tune personal FM receivers to a localised frequency, enabling them to hear a pristine stereo mix directly from the soundboard through headphones. Permission was granted from the Federal Communications Commission for the band to operate a mini-radio station specifically developed for the system. Rabin described the 1994 shows as his most satisfying tour with Yes, noting that the performances attracted a highly diverse cross-generation of older and younger fans. The tour itinerary also included a 20 June 1994 appearance on the Late Show with David Letterman to perform "Walls". Rabin recalled that host David Letterman had personally invited the band after hearing "The Calling" on his car radio and stopping his vehicle to call his producer to secure the album.

Despite the innovations and tight performances, North American ticket sales were sluggish; the band faced heavy summer concert market saturation, and casual listeners were frequently priced out by ticket costs. The 10 August 1994 performance at the Miami Arena drew approximately 3,700 attendees following minimal advertising. Promoter Leas Campbell withdrew from the initial guaranteed fee agreement of $140,000 due to low advance ticket sales, leading Yes to perform for net box office receipts of about $55,000 after expenses. Europe was omitted from the schedule altogether due to poor sales projections.

Underlying friction in the band forced a permanent fracture after the tour concluded. Rabin said he took responsibility for the album's commercial failure and, after 12 years, felt he had fully satisfied his artistic ambitions with Yes. Although Squire convinced him to stay for several more months, ongoing arguments with Anderson led Rabin to resign in 1995 to become a Hollywood film composer. Kaye also permanently parted ways with Yes following the tour's conclusion. He said he had grown tired of touring and "things started to get a little dark", something Rabin concurred and felt "I was persona non grata" after the tour. Reduced to a trio, Anderson, Squire, and White brought in Steve Howe and Rick Wakeman to mark the reunion of the band's classic lineup for the first time since 1979.

== Track listing ==
Taken from the sleeve notes:

No.	Title	Writer(s)	Length
1.	"The Calling"	Trevor Rabin, Jon Anderson, Chris Squire	6:52
2.	"I Am Waiting"	Rabin, Anderson	7:22
3.	"Real Love"	Rabin, Squire, Anderson	8:42
4.	"State of Play"	Rabin, Anderson	4:58
5.	"Walls"	Rabin, Roger Hodgson, Anderson	4:52
6.	"Where Will You Be"	Rabin, Anderson	6:03
7.	"Endless Dream: Silent Spring" (instrumental)	Rabin	1:56
8.	"Endless Dream: Talk"	Rabin, Anderson	11:56
9.	"Endless Dream: Endless Dream"	Rabin, Anderson	1:50

=== 2002 reissue ===
2002 Spitfire Records reissue
No.	Title	Writer(s)	Length
7.	"Endless Dream" a. "Silent Spring" b. "Talk" c. "Endless Dream"	Anderson, Rabin	15:42
8.	"The Calling" (extended version)	Anderson, Rabin, Squire	8:08

=== 2024 30th Anniversary edition ===
2024 30th Anniversary Reissue Disc 2: Talk Versions
No.	Title	Length
1.	"The Calling" (Special Version)	8:08
2.	"The Calling" (Single Edit)	4:41
3.	"The Calling" (Radio Edit)	5:39
4.	"Untitled – Trevor Rabin Instrumental"	2:53
5.	"Endless Dream" (Demo)	9:27
6.	"Where Will You Be" (Instrumental)	6:35
7.	"Walls" (Instrumental)	5:17
8.	"Endless Dream (Excerpt)" (Instrumental)	1:58

2024 30th Anniversary Reissue Disc 3: Live Canandaigua 19/06/94
No.	Title	Length
1.	"I Am Waiting"	7:44
2.	"The Calling"	3:07
3.	"Rhythm Of Love"	4:58
4.	"Hearts"	8:14
5.	"Real Love"	10:24
6.	"Changes"	8:44
7.	"Heart Of The Sunrise"	11:09
8.	"Roundabout"	8:36

2024 30th Anniversary Reissue Disc 4: Live Canandaigua 19/06/94
No.	Title	Length
1.	"Cinema"	2:37
2.	"City Of Love"	6:48
3.	"Make It Easy"	1:55
4.	"Owner Of A Lonely Heart"	6:21
5.	"Trevor Rabin Piano Solo/And You And I"	12:03
6.	"Where Will You Be?"	8:21
7.	"I've Seen All Good People"	6:54
8.	"Walls"	6:44
9.	"Endless Dream"	18:02

== Personnel ==
Taken from the sleeve notes.

Yes

- Jon Anderson – vocals
- Trevor Rabin – guitars, keyboards, vocals, programming
- Chris Squire – bass guitar, vocals
- Tony Kaye – Hammond organ
- Alan White – drums

Production

- Trevor Rabin – production, engineering
- Michael Jay – engineering
- Stephen Marcussen – mastering at Precision Mastering, Los Angeles, California
- Jim Baldree – mastering editor
- Paul Rivas – art direction
- Peter Max – original logo

== Charts ==
Chart (1994)	Peak position
Canada Top Albums/CDs (RPM)	47
Dutch Albums (Album Top 100)	47
Finnish Albums (The Official Finnish Charts)	31
German Albums (Offizielle Top 100)	45
Japanese Albums (Oricon)	17
Scottish Albums (Official Charts)	31
Swedish Albums (Sverigetopplistan)	31
Swiss Albums (Schweizer Hitparade)	29
UK Albums (Official Charts)	20
US Billboard 200	33

Chart (2024)	Peak position
Scottish Albums (Official Charts)	39
UK Independent Albums (Official Charts)	14
UK Progressive Albums (Official Charts)	9
UK Rock & Metal Albums (Official Charts)	4
