= The Call =

The Call may refer to:

== Film and television ==
=== Film ===
- The Call, a 1936 French film better known as The Call of Silence or L'Appel du Silence
- Pukar (2000 film) or The Call, a 2000 Indian film
- The Call, a 2002 short film by Matthew Scott Krentz
- The Call (2013 film), an American crime thriller film
- The Call (2019 film), is a Nollywood comedic movie by Woli Arole
- The Call (2020 American film), an American horror film
- The Call (2020 South Korean film), a South Korean thriller film

=== TV ===
- The Call (American TV program), a 2007–2011 American business news television program that aired on CNBC
- The Call (South Korean TV series), a 2018 South Korean music variety game show that aired on Mnet and tvN
- The Call, a former interactive news program on NY1
- "The Call" (Star Wars Rebels), an episode of the television series Star Wars Rebels
- "The Call" (The Night Agent), an episode of the television series The Night Agent
- "The Call" (The Twilight Zone), an episode of the television series The Twilight Zone

== Publications ==
=== Newspapers ===
- Der Ruf (newspaper), a World War II era POW newspaper, known in English as The Call
- The Call (BSP) an organ of international socialism published by the British Socialist Party
- The Call (Kansas City), a newspaper in Kansas City, Missouri, serving the Black American community
- The Call (Woonsocket), a general-interest daily newspaper in Woonsocket, Rhode Island
- The New York Call, sometimes simply called The Call, a socialist newspaper published by the Socialist Party of America
- The San Francisco Call

=== Novels ===
- The Call (Flanagan novel), a 1998 historical novel by Martin Flanagan
- The Call (Hersey novel), a 1985 novel by John Hersey

== Music ==
- Call (band), a Pakistani rock band based in Lahore
- The Call (band), a Santa Cruz, California-based rock band

=== Albums ===
- The Call (Charles Lloyd album), 1994
- The Call (Heed album), 2006
- The Call (Mal Waldron album), 1971
- The Call, album by underground Hip Hop artist Random
- The Call, EP by metal band Necrophobic
- The Call (Henry Grimes album), 1966

=== Songs ===
- "The Call" (Anne Murray song), 1976
- "The Call" (Backstreet Boys song), 2001
- "The Call" (Regina Spektor song)
- "The Call", song No. 4 from Five Mystical Songs
- "The Call", a song by Cirith Ungol from their 2020 album Forever Black
- "The Call", a song by Gotthard on their 2007 album Domino Effect
- "The Call", a song by Iron Savior from their 2004 album Battering Ram
- "The Call", a song by Killswitch Engage from their 2013 album Disarm the Descent
- "The Call", a song by Little Texas on their 1997 album Little Texas
- "The Call", a song by Masterplan from their 2026 album Metalmorphosis
- "The Call", a song by Matt Kennon on his 2010 album Matt Kennon
- "The Call", a song by Owen Riegling from his 2024 album Bruce County (From the Beginning)
- "The Call", a song by Vision Divine from their 2002 album Send Me an Angel
- "Die Stem van Suid-Afrika", former national anthem of South Africa, used during the apartheid era
- "Ireland's Call", song used to represent Ireland at rugby games

== Other ==
- TheCall, an evangelical parachurch organization
- The Call (painting), a 1902 painting by Paul Gauguin
- The Call (1985 World Series), an infamous blown call in Game 6 of the 1985 World Series by Major League Baseball umpire Don Denkinger

== See also ==
- Call (disambiguation)
