= Calling =

Calling may refer to:

- Religious calling, a religious vocation
- Effectual calling, a theological term
- Vocation, or occupation
- Audible animal communication, including mate calling and territorial threat sounds
- Game call, a device that is used to mimic animal communication noises to attract or drive animals to a hunter
- Calling, a type of courtship in the history of the United States
- Dance calling by a dance caller

== Arts and entertainment ==
- Calling (EP), a 2007 EP by Japanese band Unsraw
- Calling (Kobukuro album), a 2009 album by Kobukuro
- "Calling" (Geri Halliwell song), 2001
- "Calling" (Arashi song), 2013
- "Calling" (B'z song), 1997
- "Calling" (Coldrain song), 2022
- "Calling" (Metro Boomin, Swae Lee and Nav song), 2023
- "Calling" (Taproot song), 2005
- "Calling" (Vamps song), 2017
- "Calling", a 2021 song by James Marriott, from No Left Brain
- "Calling", a 2021 song by Rod Wave, from SoulFly
- "Calling", a 2014 song by Pink Floyd, from The Endless River
- "Calling (Lose My Mind)", a 2012 single by Sebastian Ingrosso and Alesso
- Calling (video game), a 2009 horror video game for the Wii
- "Calling", a song for the 2007 game The World Ends with You
- "Calling", a 1986 song by Status Quo from In the Army Now

== See also ==
- Call (disambiguation)
- The Calling (disambiguation)
