= Call =

Call or Calls may refer to:

== Arts, entertainment, and media ==
=== Games ===
- Call (poker), a bet matching an opponent's
- Call, in the game of contract bridge, a bid, pass, double, or redouble in the bidding stage

=== Music and dance ===
- Call (band), from Lahore, Pakistan
- Call, a command in square dancing, delivered by a caller
- "Call / I4U", a 2011 single by Japanese music group AAA
- "Call", a 2002 song by Ashanti from her album Ashanti
- "Call" (Stray Kids song), 2021

=== Film ===
- Call (film), or The Call, 2020 South Korean film
- Calls (film), 2021 Indian Tamil-language crime thriller film

=== Television ===
- Calls (TV series), a mystery thriller TV series on Apple TV+

== Finance ==
- Call on shares, a request for a further payment on partly paid share capital
- Call option, a term in stock trading

== Places ==
- Call, North Carolina, United States
- Call, Texas, United States

== Science and technology ==
=== Computing ===
- Call, a shell command in DOS, OS/2 and Microsoft Windows command-line interpreters
- Call, a method of invoking a subroutine, including perhaps a system call, where a program requests service from the operating system
- Computer-assisted language learning, a concept in language education

=== Nature ===
- Animal communication, a song or noise made by an animal such as:
  - Bird call, a type of bird vocalization
  - Mating call, animal communication to attract a sexual partner
- Game call, a device that is used to mimic animal communication noises to attract or drive animals to a hunter

=== Telecommunications ===
- Call, an attempt to set up a telecommunication circuit
- Call, in teletraffic engineering, a unit of traffic measurement
- Call origination, in telephony
- Call sign, in broadcasting and radio communications, a unique designation for a transmitting station
- Telephone call

== Other uses ==
- Call (surname)
- Religious calling
- CALL, U.S. Army Center for Army Lessons Learned
- CALL, Center for Anglican Learning & Leadership at the Church Divinity School of the Pacific

== See also ==
- Caller (disambiguation)
- Calling (disambiguation)
- The Call (disambiguation)
