= The Caller =

The Caller may refer to:

- The Caller (folk song), a 19th-century song written by Edward “Ned” Corvan
- The Caller (1987 film), a 1987 mystery-thriller film
- The Caller (2008 film), a 2008 drama-thriller film
- The Caller (2011 film), a 2011 supernatural thriller film
- The Caller (novel), a crime fiction novel by Karin Fossum
- The Caller, a 2013 fantasy novel for young adults by Juliet Marillier
- The Caller, print publication for Crime Stoppers International
- The Daily Caller, an American news and opinion website based in Washington, D.C.

== See also ==
- Caller (disambiguation)
