= The Calling (McCann sculpture) =

Sculpture in Belfast, Northern Ireland

Coordinates: 54.6021°N 5.9255°W

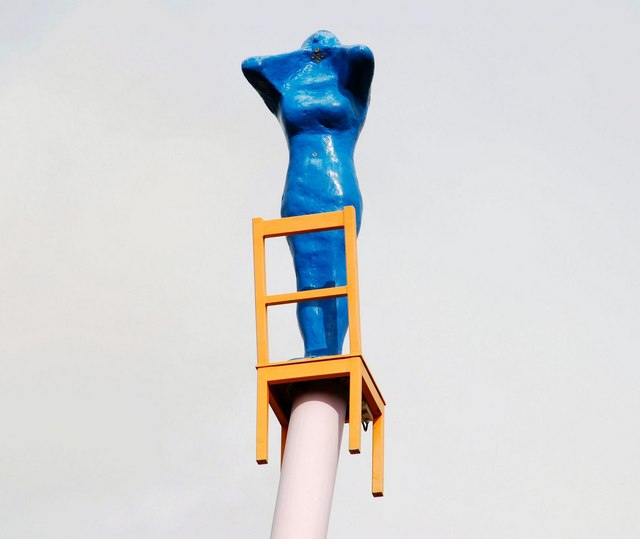
- Artist: Paddy McCann
- Year: 2003
- Type: public sculpture
- Location: Belfast

The Calling is an outdoor sculpture by Paddy McCann located in Belfast, Northern Ireland. Located at the junction of Gordon Street and Dunbar Junction, it consists of a bright red stylised male human figure calling into the distance while standing on an ordinary chair atop an extended (and angled) piston-like arm. A similarly mounted blue female figure, opposite the first, calls back across the square. It was installed in 2003.
