= Walls (Yes song) =

Promotional single by Yes

from the album Talk
- Released: June 1994 (US promo)
- Genre: Rock
- Length: 4:57
- Label: Victory Music
- Songwriters: Jon Anderson; Trevor Rabin; Roger Hodgson
- Producer: Trevor Rabin

Yes singles chronology
"The Calling" (1994)	"Walls" (1994)	"Open Your Eyes" (1997)

"Walls" is a song by the progressive rock band Yes, from their 1994 album Talk. Roger Hodgson, the songwriter formerly of fellow progressive rock band Supertramp, wrote "Walls" with Yes guitarist Trevor Rabin. It was a rock radio hit for the band, reaching number 24 on Billboard's Hot Mainstream Rock Tracks chart. It also became Yes’ second-to-last charting single.

== Details ==
An earlier single, "Saving My Heart" from 1991's Union, was also originally intended as a collaboration between Trevor Rabin and Roger Hodgson. According to Rabin, "Walls" was the last track to be finished for the album.

Rabin and Hodgson wrote a lot of material together and became close friends.

"Walls" reached number 24 on the Mainstream Rock chart in 1994.

Rabin later included a pre-Yes version of the song on his album of demo recordings, 2003's 90124, where it is titled "Walls Demo 1990". Hodgson shares vocals with Rabin on the demo as well.

== Charts ==
Chart (1994)	Peak position
US Mainstream Rock (Billboard)	24
