= The Calling (song) =

Single by Yes

from the album Talk
- B-side: "Real Love"
- Released: 16 March 1994 (JPN)
- Genre: Rock
- Length: 4:40 (single edit); 5:58 (radio edit); 6:56 (album edit); 8:05 (original version)
- Label: Victory Music
- Songwriter(s): Jon Anderson; Trevor Rabin; Chris Squire
- Producer(s): Trevor Rabin

Yes singles chronology
"Saving My Heart" (1991)	"The Calling" (1994)	"Walls" (1994)

"The Calling" is a song by the progressive rock band Yes, from their 1994 album Talk. "The Calling" was a number-three Mainstream Rock hit for the band in 1994, their last (as of 2024) top-ten hit on that chart. Yes had two subsequent Mainstream Rock hits: 1994's "Walls" (also from Talk) and 1997's "Open Your Eyes" from the album of the same name.

"The Calling" has appeared on several Yes compilations. The 2002 boxed set In a Word: Yes (1969–) included the album-length version, and the 2003 greatest hits package The Ultimate Yes: 35th Anniversary Collection included the single edit.

== Background ==
In 1992, eight current and former members of Yes toured to support their 1991 album Union. Following the completion of the tour, guitarist Steve Howe, keyboardist Rick Wakeman and drummer Bill Bruford left the band, leaving the five members who had performed as Yes during the 1980s: singer Jon Anderson, guitarist Trevor Rabin, bassist Chris Squire, drummer Alan White and keyboardist Tony Kaye.

"The Calling" was written by Rabin, Anderson and Squire, with Rabin producing. As with the other tracks on Talk, "The Calling" was recorded and mixed digitally, rather than on tape as was done with previous Yes recordings. The song has been described as featuring a modern sound, with heavy focus on Rabin's guitars, and a three-part vocal harmony featuring Anderson, Rabin and Squire.

According to Anderson, the song's lyrics were inspired by the concept of "local history", the current three-thousand year window of history, outside of which mankind has little visibility or understanding.

== Charts ==
Chart (1994)	Peak position
US Mainstream Rock (Billboard)	3
