= Calling (video game) =

2009 video game

- Developer: Hudson Soft
- Publisher: Hudson Soft
- Composers: TRIFONIC; Kenichiro Suehiro; Keigo Mikami
- Platform: Wii
- Release: JP: November 19, 2009; NA: March 9, 2010; EU: March 19, 2010
- Genre: Survival horror
- Mode: Single-player

Calling, also known as Calling: Kuroki Chakushin (CALLING～黒き着信～; lit. Calling: Dark Message) in Japan, is a survival horror video game developed and published by Hudson Soft exclusively for the Wii console. The game was released in Japan on November 19, 2009, in North America on March 9, 2010, and in Europe on March 19, 2010.

== Gameplay ==
In Calling, players assume a first-person perspective, exploring various haunted locations within the Mnemonic Abyss. Locations include a doll-filled house, Shosei High School, an internet café, a hospital, a bedroom, and a hair salon. Interacting with objects and navigating through the game is done through the use of the Wii Remote's pointer function. Additionally, the controller doubles as a mobile phone through which ghosts communicate with the player character via the speaker. The phone also provides a means of transportation between locations, and functions as a tool for capturing photographic evidence and recording ghostly voices.

Throughout the game, players will face various ghostly entities in designated "fight events", where they must act swinging motions with the Wii Remote while following on-screen button commands in order to fend them off.

== Plot ==
Rin Kagura, Shin Suzutani, Chiyo Kishibe, and Makoto Shirae visit "The Black Page," a mysterious website that displays a death counter. Rin is compelled to visit the site because of a promise she made to a sick girl, Kureneko, six years prior over an online chatroom. Upon entering a chatroom on the site, the four friends are transported to the "Mnemonic Abyss," a purgatory-like void between life and death that materializes memories of the deceased. The group attempts to escape by using their mobile phones as teleportation devices.

Shin finds himself in the home of a doll-maker, who is obsessed with creating lifelike dolls. Later, he discovers Chiyo unconscious on the floor, surrounded by the doll maker's eerie creations. He flees back to where he began and is attacked by the ghost of a little girl holding a black cat doll. Rin is the next to enter the Abyss, finding herself in a school after having a recurring dream. Shin soon joins her, and they encounter Makoto, who explains the connection between the Abyss and the Black Page. Rin sees the ghost of Kureneko, who accuses her of breaking their promise before disappearing.

When Shin suffers a stroke and vanishes, Rin learns that using their phones to teleport will kill them if they attempt to phone themselves. She uses the number on the Black Page to teleport to a room full of dolls, where she meets Chiyo. Later, Chiyo follows a ghost of a mailman into a void that leads to the hospital she was meant to be staying at before finding the Black Page. Rin follows her and discovers a phone number on a note left in Chiyo's place. Dialing the number, Rin teleports to a 2-story house and eventually contacts Kuroneko, with whom she had made the promise six years ago.

Kuroneko tries to jump out of the window, but Rin stops her by grabbing her wrist. Both girls fall to their deaths. The scene rewinds itself to show Rin arriving at the hospital, and then Makoto waking up in an otaku's room. At school, he meets his deceased partner, Sadao, who kills him, wanting to be "partners" again. In another timeline, Rin apologizes to Kuroneko and reenacts the previous scene, and just before Kuroneko jumps, we see what happened to them both in the hospital. Rin hugs Kuroneko's black cat doll in a post-credits scene.

== Development ==
The game was first unofficially unveiled when gameplay footage was leaked onto the internet in October 2008. Hudson reported that the footage was stolen from a PR company's servers. It was later officially revealed in Famitsu in July 2009.

== Reception ==
Reception

Aggregate scores
Aggregator	Score
GameRankings	51.40%
Metacritic	49/100

Review scores
Publication	Score
Adventure Gamers	2/5
Destructoid	3.5/10
Edge	5/10
Famitsu	28/40
Game Informer	4.5/10
GameSpot	3.5/10
GameZone	5/10
IGN	3.5/10
Nintendo Life	5/10
Nintendo Power	5/10
Nintendo World Report	4.5/10
411Mania	5.8/10
Teletext GameCentral	4/10

Calling received "generally unfavorable reviews" according to the review aggregation website Metacritic. In Japan, however, Famitsu gave it a score of one eight, two sevens, and one six for a total of 28 out of 40.

Annette Gonzalez of Game Informer said: "Exploring Calling's generic locales to interact with countless objects and engage in uneventful set pieces is hardly enjoyable. The game suffers from slow pacing throughout the eight-plus hour experience, which fittingly ends with an anticlimactic scene." Jack DeVries of IGN called it worthless, saying: "The acting is terrible, it controls poorly, and it's chock full of dumb clichés. It's the videogame equivalent of the more recent Asian horror remakes." Nathan Meunier of GameSpot criticized the game's sluggish pace and needless backtracking. He however noted that the game's controls were responsive in the exploration sections which made "the awful wagglefest that ensues during every single ghostly encounter a big disappointment." Jon Wahlgren of Nintendo Life said: "Sometimes things without the most original ideas can still elevate themselves higher than the sum of their parts through tight execution, but unfortunately Calling fails to keep things together for more than an hour." James Stephanie Sterling of Destructoid said that the game "traded in the scares for grinding repetition and long walks down black hallways that stop being creepy as soon as you realize that the game is just stalling for time and has no intention of surprising you."

Ramon Aranda of 411Mania said: "While Calling does provide some scares and a somewhat interesting synopsis, the game fails to really capture you and features too much repetitive gameplay. If you're a patient person you'll likely find something fun with this game but the more you progress, the more likely you'll find yourself a bit on the bored side. It's a decent first effort by Hudson with this type of game but it's too unpolished to truly enjoy." Edge said: "A few hairy moments in, and any attempt to get back under your skin is redundant. Mostly this is because the game's resident evil is largely incapable of harming you, and any sense of jeopardy is lost." Steven Hopper of GameZone said: While the controls are pretty solid and easy to get the hang of, the game is a very boring and uninspired affair." Nintendo Power said: "If you really liked Ju-On, Calling might be for you; just don't expect its story or overall presentation to grab you the way its ghosts do." Neal Ronaghan of Nintendo World Report said that the game "falls flat. Its redeeming qualities, such as the interesting story and atmosphere, are neutered by its meandering gameplay." Jack Allin of Adventure Gamers stated that "while the tragic backstory is worth seeing through and the cell phone concept is novel for a while, all that's left beyond that is a poorly-paced exploration in the dark, punctuated by a series of startling yet repetitive ghost encounters. So unless that's your idea of a good time, this is one number that's probably not worth picking up." David Jenkins of Teletext GameCentral stated that "The real survival horror [in the game] is enduring the repetitive scares and gameplay all the way to the end."
